= List of mammals of North America =

This is a list of North American mammals. It includes all mammals currently found in the United States, Saint Pierre and Miquelon, Canada, Greenland, Bermuda, Mexico, Central America, and the Caribbean region, whether resident or as migrants. This article does not include species found only in captivity. Mammal species which became extinct in the last 10,000 to 13,000 years are also included in this article. Each species is listed, with its binomial name. Most established introduced species occurring across multiple states and provinces are also noted.

Icons which state each species' global IUCN status:
EX	Extinct	No reasonable doubt that the last individual has died
CR	Critically Endangered	In imminent risk of extinction in the wild
EN	Endangered	Facing an extremely high risk of extinction in the wild
VU	Vulnerable	Facing a high risk of extinction in the wild
NT	Near Threatened	Doesn't meet any criteria that would categorise it as risking extinction but likely to in the future
LC	Least Concern	No current identifiable risks to this species
DD	Data Deficient	Inadequate information to make an assessment of the risks to this species

Some species are identified as indicated below:

- (A) = Accidental: occurrence based on one or a few records, and unlikely to occur regularly
- (E) = Extinct: died out between 13,000 years ago and the present
- (Ex) = Extirpated: no longer occurs in area of interest, but other populations exist elsewhere
- (I) = Introduced: population established solely as result of direct or indirect human intervention; synonymous with non-native and non-indigenous

and Endangered Species Act:

E - endangered, T - threatened
XN, XE - experimental non essential or essential population
E(S/A), T(S/A) - endangered or threatened due to similarity of appearance
(selected only taxa found in the US, the data is current as of March 28, 2014)

== Didelphimorphia (opossums) ==
=== Didelphidae ===
- Common opossum, Didelphis marsupialis LC
- Virginia opossum, Didelphis virginiana (Note: Baker et al. 2003, Kays & Wilson 2002, North American Mammals NMNH SI, Mammal Species of the World (MSW3), IUCN Red List.) (Note: Virginia opossum, Didelphis virginiana: Burt & Grossenheider 1976 (Peterson Field Guide) - as Opossum, D. marsupialis (merged Mexican, D. marsupialis and D. virginiana).) LC
- Derby's woolly opossum, Caluromys derbianus LC
- Bare-tailed woolly opossum, Caluromys philander LC
- Water opossum, Chironectes minimus LC
- Adler's woolly mouse opossum, Marmosa adleri
- Alston's mouse opossum, Marmosa alstoni LC and: (Note: Species split from this species or considered as distinct species alternatively. All these taxa occur in the area of interest, including the one on the left.)
  - Nicaraguan woolly mouse opossum, Marmosa nicaraguae
- Isthmian mouse opossum, Marmosa isthmica
- Mexican mouse opossum, Marmosa mexicana LC and:
  - Zeledon's mouse opossum, Marmosa zeledoni
- Linnaeus's mouse opossum, Marmosa murina LC
- Robinson's mouse opossum, Marmosa robinsoni LC
- Tschudi's slender opossum, Marmosops caucae LC
- Dusky slender opossum, Marmosops fuscatus DD and:
  - Carr's slender opossum, Marmosops carri
- Panama slender opossum, Marmosops invictus LC
- Brown four-eyed opossum, Metachirus nudicaudatus LC and:
  - Common brown four-eyed opossum, Metachirus myosuros
- Sepia short-tailed opossum, Monodelphis adusta LC
- Gray four-eyed opossum, Philander opossum LC and:
  - Dark four-eyed opossum, Philander melanurus
  - Northern four-eyed opossum, Philander vossi
- Balsas gray mouse opossum, Tlacuatzin balsasensis
- Grayish mouse opossum, Tlacuatzin canescens LC and:
  - Yucatán gray mouse opossum, Tlacuatzin gaumeri
  - Tres Marías gray mouse opossum, Tlacuatzin insularis
  - Northern gray mouse opossum, Tlacuatzin sinaloae

== Cingulata (armadillos) ==
=== Dasypodidae ===
- Beautiful armadillo, Dasypus bellus (E)
- Mexican long-nosed armadillo, Dasypus mexicanus LC

=== Chlamyphoridae ===
- Northern naked-tailed armadillo, Cabassous centralis LC
- American glyptodont, Glyptotherium floridanum (E)

=== Pampatheriidae ===
- American giant armadillo, Holmesina septentrionalis (E)

== Pilosa: Vermilingua (anteaters and tamanduas) ==
=== Cyclopedidae ===
- Common silky anteater, Cyclopes didactylus LC
- Central American silky anteater, Cyclopes dorsalis NE

=== Myrmecophagidae ===
- Giant anteater, Myrmecophaga tridactyla VU
- Northern tamandua, Tamandua mexicana LC
- Southern tamandua, Tamandua tetradactyla LC

== Pilosa: Folivora (sloths) ==
=== Megalonychidae ===
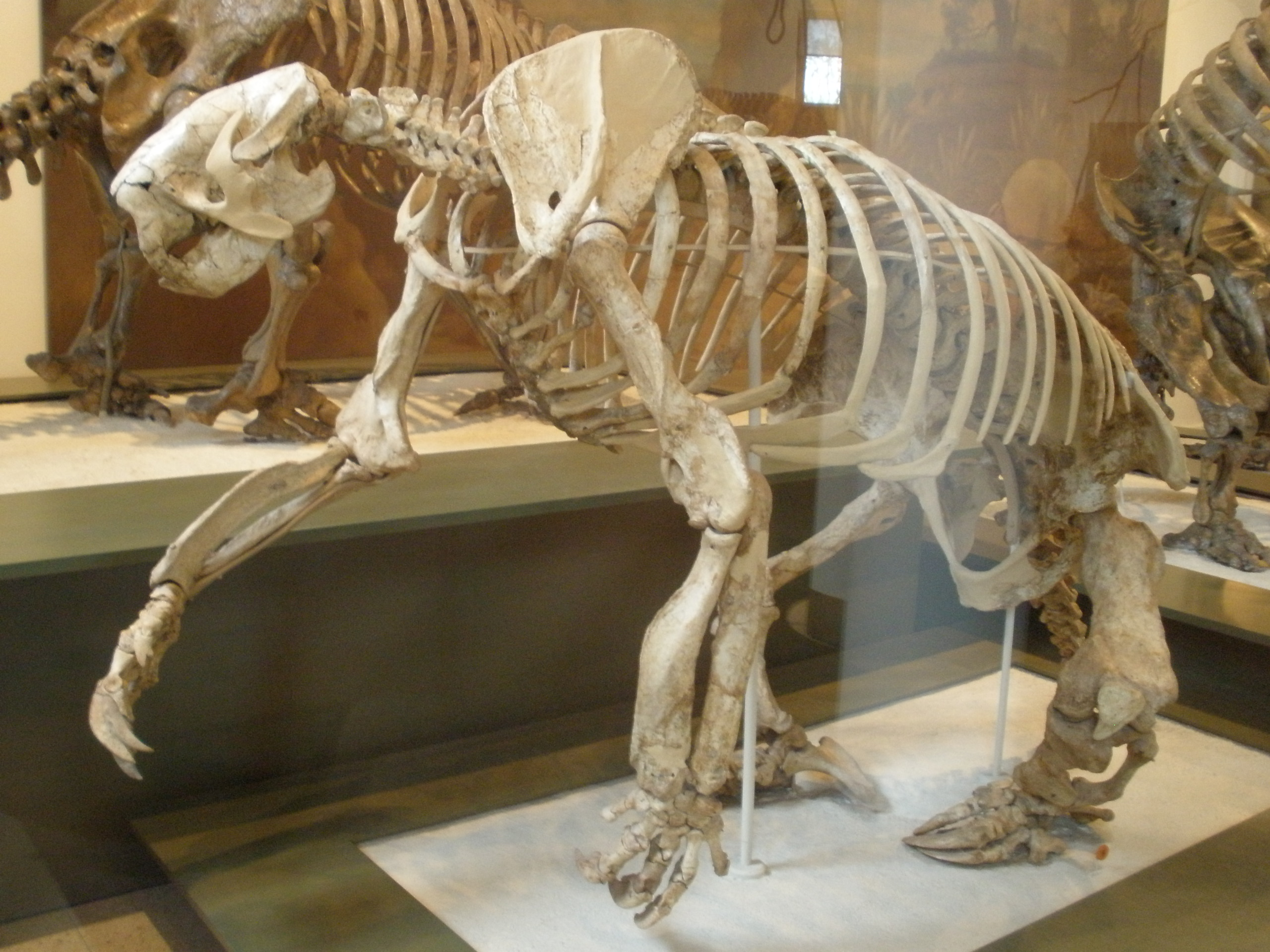
Jefferson's ground sloth

- Jefferson ground sloth, Megalonyx jeffersonii (E)

=== Bradypodidae (three-toed sloths) ===
- Pygmy three-toed sloth, Bradypus pygmaeus CR
- Brown-throated sloth, Bradypus variegatus LC

=== Choloepodidae (two-toed sloths) ===
- Hoffmann's two-toed sloth, Choloepus hoffmanni LC

=== Megatheriidae ===
- American giant ground sloth, Eremotherium laurillardi (E)

=== Mylodontidae ===
- Harlan's ground sloth, Paramylodon harlani (E)

=== Nothrotheriidae ===
- Shasta ground sloth, Nothrotheriops shastensis (E)

== Rodentia (rodents) ==
=== Echimyidae ===
==== Heteropsomyinae ====
- Oriente cave rat, Boromys offella EX (E)
- Torre's cave rat, Boromys torrei EX (E)
- Hispaniolan edible rat, Brotomys voratus EX (E)
- Antillean cave rat, Heteropsomys antillensis (E)
- Insular cave rat, Heteropsomys insulans (E) EX

==== Echimyinae ====
- Rufous soft-furred spiny-rat, Diplomys labilis LC
- Armored rat, Hoplomys gymnurus LC
- Red-nosed armored tree-rat, Makalata didelphoides LC
- Tome's spiny-rat, Proechimys semispinosus LC
- Trinidad spiny-rat, Proechimys trinitatis LC

==== Capromyinae (hutias) ====
- Garrido's hutia, Capromys garridoi
- Desmarest's hutia, Capromys pilorides LC and:
  - Gundlach's hutia, Capromys gundlachianus
- Jamaican coney, Geocapromys brownii EN
- Cayman hutia, Geocapromys caymanensis (E)
- Cuban coney, Geocapromys columbianus (E) EX
- Bahamian hutia, Geocapromys ingrahami VU
- Little Swan Island hutia, Geocapromys thoracatus (E)
- Imposter hutia, Hexolobodon phenax (E) EX
- Wide-toothed hutia, Hyperplagiodontia araeum (E)
- Montane hutia, Isolobodon montanus (E) EX
- Puerto Rican hutia, Isolobodon portoricensis (E) EX
- Cabrera's hutia, Mesocapromys angelcabrerai CR
- Eared hutia, Mesocapromys auritus EN
- Black-tailed hutia, Mesocapromys melanurus EN
- Dwarf hutia, Mesocapromys nana CR
- San Felipe hutia, Mesocapromys sanfelipensis CR
- Prehensile-tailed hutia, Mysateles prehensilis NT and:
  - Isla De La Juventud tree hutia, Mysateles prehensilis meridionalis
- Hispaniolan hutia, Plagiodontia aedium CR or: (Note: [Species split from this species or considered as distinct species alternatively.When treating these taxa separately, the one on the left does not occur in the area of interest.)
  - Small Haitian hutia, Plagiodontia spelaeum (E)
- Samaná hutia, Plagiodontia ipnaeum (E)
- Lemke's hutia, Rhizoplagiodontia lemkei (E)

=== Aplodontiidae ===
- Mountain beaver, Aplodontia rufa (Note: Baker et al. 2003, Burt & Grossenheider 1976 (Peterson Field Guide), Kays & Wilson 2002, North American Mammals NMNH SI, Mammal Species of the World (MSW3), IUCN Red List.) LC

(ssp. A. r. nigra: E)

=== Castoridae (beavers) ===
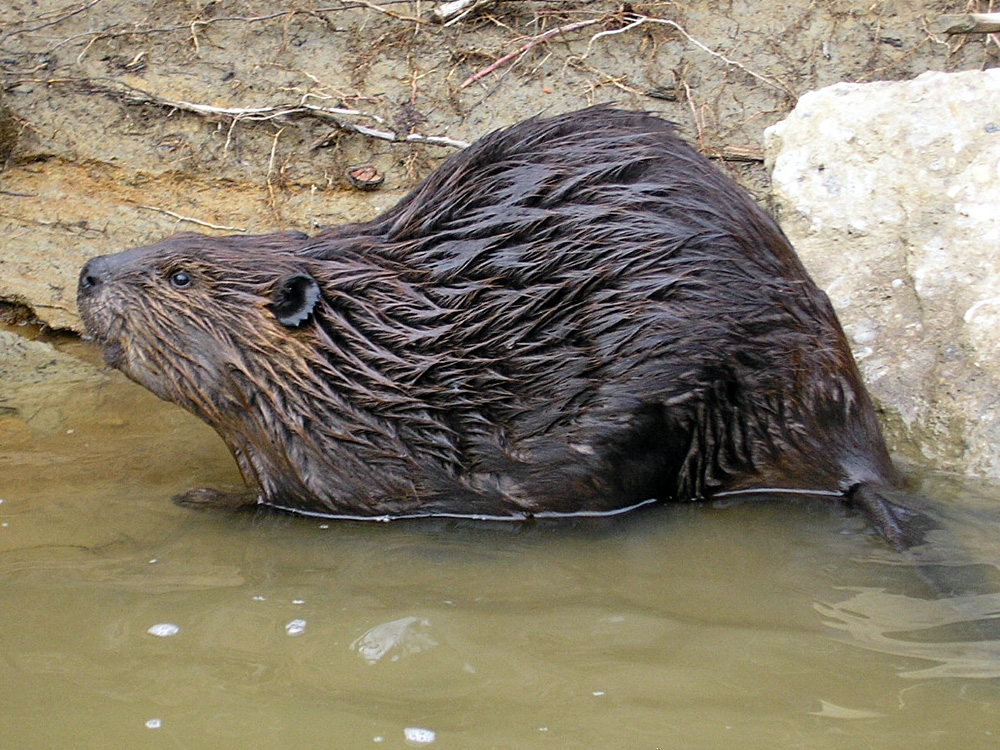
North American beaver

- North American beaver, Castor canadensis LC
- Giant beaver, Castoroides ohioensis (E)

=== Zapodidae (jumping mice) ===
- Eastern woodland jumping mouse, Napaeozapus insignis LC and:
  - Western woodland jumping mouse, Napaeozapus abietorum
- Northern meadow jumping mouse, Zapus hudsonius LC

(Preble's meadow jumping mouse, Z. h. preblei: T) and:
- Southern meadow jumping mouse, Zapus luteus

- South-western jumping mouse, Zapus princeps LC and:
  - Oregon jumping mouse, Zapus oregonus
  - South Pacific jumping mouse, Zapus pacificus
  - North-western jumping mouse, Zapus saltator
- North Pacific jumping mouse, Zapus trinotatus LC and:
  - Central Pacific jumping mouse, Zapus montanus

=== Erethizontidae (New World porcupines) ===
- Mexican hairy dwarf porcupine, Coendou mexicanus LC
- Brazilian porcupine, Coendou prehensilis LC and:
  - Amazonian long-tailed porcupine, Coendou longicaudatus
- Andean porcupine, Coendou quichua DD
- North American porcupine, Erethizon dorsatum LC

=== Caviidae (cavy family) ===
- Lesser capybara, Hydrochoerus isthmius DD
- Pinckney's capybara, Neochoerus pinckneyi (E)
- Holmes's capybara, Neochoerus aesopi (E)

=== Heptaxodontidae (giant hutia) ===
- Blunt-toothed giant hutia, Amblyrhiza inundata (E)
- Osborn's key mouse, Clidomys osborni (E)
- Plate-toothed giant hutia, Elasmodontomys obliquus (E)
- Twisted-toothed mouse, Quemisia gravis (E)

=== Dasyproctidae ===
- Coiban agouti, Dasyprocta coibae VU
- Common red-rumped agouti, Dasyprocta leporina LC
- Mexican agouti, Dasyprocta mexicana CR
- Central American agouti, Dasyprocta punctata LC
- Ruatan Island agouti, Dasyprocta ruatanica EN

=== Cuniculidae ===
- Lowland paca, Cuniculus paca LC

=== Geomyidae (pocket gophers) ===
There has been much debate among taxonomists about which races of pocket gopher should be recognized as full species, and the following list cannot be regarded as definitive.

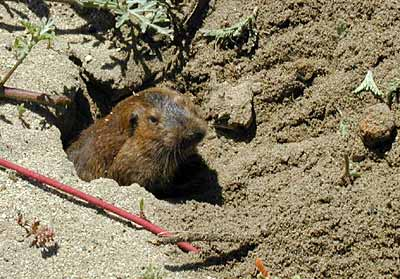
Botta's pocket gopher

- Yellow-faced pocket gopher, Cratogeomys castanops LC
- Oriental Basin pocket gopher, Cratogeomys fulvescens LC
- Smoky pocket gopher, Cratogeomys fumosus LC and:
  - Volcan de Toluca pocket gopher, Cratogeomys planiceps LC
- Goldman's pocket gopher, Cratogeomys goldmani LC
- Merriam's pocket gopher, Cratogeomys merriami LC
- Perote pocket gopher, Cratogeomys perotensis LC
- Desert pocket gopher, Geomys arenarius (Note: Burt & Grossenheider 1976 (Peterson Field Guide) - mentioned only in the description of another species as possible split.) NT
- Attwater's pocket gopher, Geomys attwateri LC
- Baird's pocket gopher, Geomys breviceps LC
- Plains pocket gopher, Geomys bursarius (Note: Burt & Grossenheider 1976 (Peterson Field Guide) - described separately as the nominative species but merged with another species.) LC and:
  - Hall's pocket gopher, Geomys jugossicularis
  - Sand Hills pocket gopher, Geomys lutescens
- Knox Jones's pocket gopher, Geomys knoxjonesi LC
- Texas pocket gopher, Geomys personatus (Note: Texas pocket gopher, Geomys personatus: Burt & Grossenheider 1976 (Peterson Field Guide), Kays & Wilson 2002, North American Mammals NMNH SI, Mammal Species of the World (MSW3), IUCN Red List. Baker et al. 2003, - as 2 distinct species: Texas Pocket Gopher G. personatus and Strecker's Pocket Gopher G. streckeri.) LC and:
  - Strecker's pocket gopher, Geomys streckeri
- Southeastern pocket gopher, Geomys pinetis LC
- Llano pocket gopher, Geomys texensis LC
- Tropical pocket gopher, Geomys tropicalis CR
- Chiriqui pocket gopher, Heterogeomys cavator LC
- Cherrie's pocket gopher, Heterogeomys cherriei LC
- Darien pocket gopher, Heterogeomys dariensis LC
- Variable pocket gopher, Heterogeomys heterodus NT
- Hispid pocket gopher, Heterogeomys hispidus LC
- Big pocket gopher, Heterogeomys lanius CR
- Underwood's pocket gopher, Heterogeomys underwoodi LC
- Giant pocket gopher, Orthogeomys grandis LC and:
  - Oaxacan pocket gopher, Orthogeomys cuniculus DD
- Botta's pocket gopher, Thomomys bottae (Note: Baker et al. 2003, Kays & Wilson 2002, North American Mammals NMNH SI, Mammal Species of the World (MSW3), IUCN Red List. Burt & Grossenheider 1976 (Peterson Field Guide) - described as the nominative species and 1 or 2 additional distinct species.) LC
- Camas pocket gopher, Thomomys bulbivorus LC
- Wyoming pocket gopher, Thomomys clusius LC
- Idaho pocket gopher, Thomomys idahoensis LC
- Mazama pocket gopher, Thomomys mazama LC
- Mountain pocket gopher, Thomomys monticola LC
- Nayar pocket gopher, Thomomys nayarensis
- Northern pocket gopher, Thomomys talpoides LC
- Townsend's pocket gopher, Thomomys townsendii LC
- Southern pocket gopher, Thomomys umbrinus LC and:
  - Black-and-brown pocket gopher, Thomomys atrovarius
  - Sierra Madre occidental pocket gopher, Thomomys sheldoni
- Alcorn's pocket gopher, Pappogeomys alcorni CR
- Buller's pocket gopher, Pappogeomys bulleri LC
- Michoacan pocket gopher, Zygogeomys trichopus EN

=== Heteromyidae ===
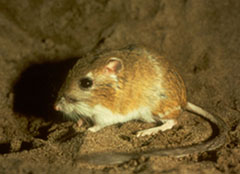
Ord's kangaroo rat

- California kangaroo rat, Dipodomys californicus LC
- Gulf Coast kangaroo rat, Dipodomys compactus LC
- Desert kangaroo rat, Dipodomys deserti LC
- Texas kangaroo rat, Dipodomys elator VU
- San Quintin kangaroo rat, Dipodomys gravipes CR
- Heermann's kangaroo rat, Dipodomys heermanni LC

(Morro Bay kangaroo rat, D. h. morroensis: E)

- Giant kangaroo rat, Dipodomys ingens EN E
- Merriam's kangaroo rat, Dipodomys merriami LC

(San Bernardino kangaroo rat, D. m. parvus: E)

- Chisel-toothed kangaroo rat, Dipodomys microps LC
- Nelson's kangaroo rat, Dipodomys nelsoni LC
- Fresno kangaroo rat, Dipodomys nitratoides VU

(Fresno subspecies D. n. exilis and Tipton kangaroo rat, D. n. nitratoides: E)

- Ord's kangaroo rat, Dipodomys ordii LC
- Panamint kangaroo rat, Dipodomys panamintinus LC
- Phillips's kangaroo rat, Dipodomys phillipsii LC and:
  - Plateau kangaroo rat, Dipodomys ornatus LC
- Dulzura kangaroo rat, Dipodomys simulans LC
- Banner-tailed kangaroo rat, Dipodomys spectabilis NT
- Stephens's kangaroo rat, Dipodomys stephensi VU E
- Narrow-faced kangaroo rat, Dipodomys venustus LC
  - Big-eared kangaroo rat, Dipodomys (venustus) elephantinus (Note: Burt & Grossenheider 1976 (Peterson Field Guide), Kays & Wilson 2002.) (Note: Mammal Species of the World (MSW3) and IUCN Red List, also probably North American Mammals NMNH SI and Baker et al. 2003 - Dipodomys elephantinus merged with D. venustus as D. venustus elephantinus.) (Note: Not recognized as a separate species in the Mammal Diversity Database v. 1.10.)
- Agile kangaroo rat, Dipodomys agilis LC
- Panamanian spiny pocket mouse, Heteromys adspersus NT
- Trinidad spiny pocket mouse, Heteromys anomalus LC
- Southern spiny pocket mouse, Heteromys australis LC
- Desmarest's spiny pocket mouse, Heteromys desmarestianus LC and:
  - Goldman's spiny pocket mouse, Heteromys goldmani
- Gaumer's spiny pocket mouse, Heteromys gaumeri LC
- Mexican spiny pocket mouse, Heteromys irroratus LC and:
  - Buller's spiny pocket mouse, Heteromys bulleri
- Nelson's spiny pocket mouse, Heteromys nelsoni EN
- Cloud-dwelling spiny pocket mouse, Heteromys nubicolens
- Mountain spiny pocket mouse, Heteromys oresterus LC
- Painted spiny pocket mouse, Heteromys pictus LC
- Salvin's spiny pocket mouse, Heteromys salvini LC
- Jaliscan spiny pocket mouse, Heteromys spectabilis EN
- Dark kangaroo mouse, Microdipodops megacephalus LC
- Pale kangaroo mouse, Microdipodops pallidus LC
- White-eared pocket mouse, Perognathus alticola VU
- Arizona pocket mouse, Perognathus amplus LC
- Olive-backed pocket mouse, Perognathus fasciatus LC
- Plains pocket mouse, Perognathus flavescens LC
- Silky pocket mouse, Perognathus flavus LC
- San Joaquin pocket mouse, Perognathus inornatus LC
- Little pocket mouse, Perognathus longimembris LC

(Pacific pocket mouse, P. l. pacificus: E)

- Merriam's pocket mouse, Perognathus merriami LC
- Columbia Plateau pocket mouse, Perognathus parvus LC and:
  - Great Basin pocket mouse, Perognathus mollipilosus
- Little desert pocket mouse, Chaetodipus arenarius LC and:
  - Cerralvo Island pocket mouse, Chaetodipus siccus LC
- Narrow-skulled pocket mouse, Chaetodipus artus LC
- Bailey's pocket mouse, Chaetodipus baileyi LC
- California pocket mouse, Chaetodipus californicus LC
- Nelson's pocket mouse, Chaetodipus nelsoni LC and:
  - Highland coarse-haired pocket mouse, Chaetodipus collis
- Dalquest's pocket mouse, Chaetodipus ammophilus NT and:
  - Dalquest's pocket mouse, Chaetodipus (ammophilus) dalquesti VU
- Durango coarse-haired pocket mouse, Chaetodipus durangae
- Chihuahuan pocket mouse, Chaetodipus eremicus LC
- San Diego pocket mouse, Chaetodipus fallax LC
- Long-tailed pocket mouse, Chaetodipus formosus LC
- Goldman's pocket mouse, Chaetodipus goldmani NT
- Hispid pocket mouse, Chaetodipus hispidus LC
- Rock pocket mouse, Chaetodipus intermedius LC
- Lined pocket mouse, Chaetodipus lineatus DD
- Desert pocket mouse, Chaetodipus penicillatus LC
- Sinaloan pocket mouse, Chaetodipus pernix LC
- Baja pocket mouse, Chaetodipus rudinoris (Note: Baker et al. 2003, North American Mammals NMNH SI, Mammal Species of the World (MSW3), IUCN Red List.) LC
- Spiny pocket mouse, Chaetodipus spinatus LC

=== Sciuridae (squirrels) ===
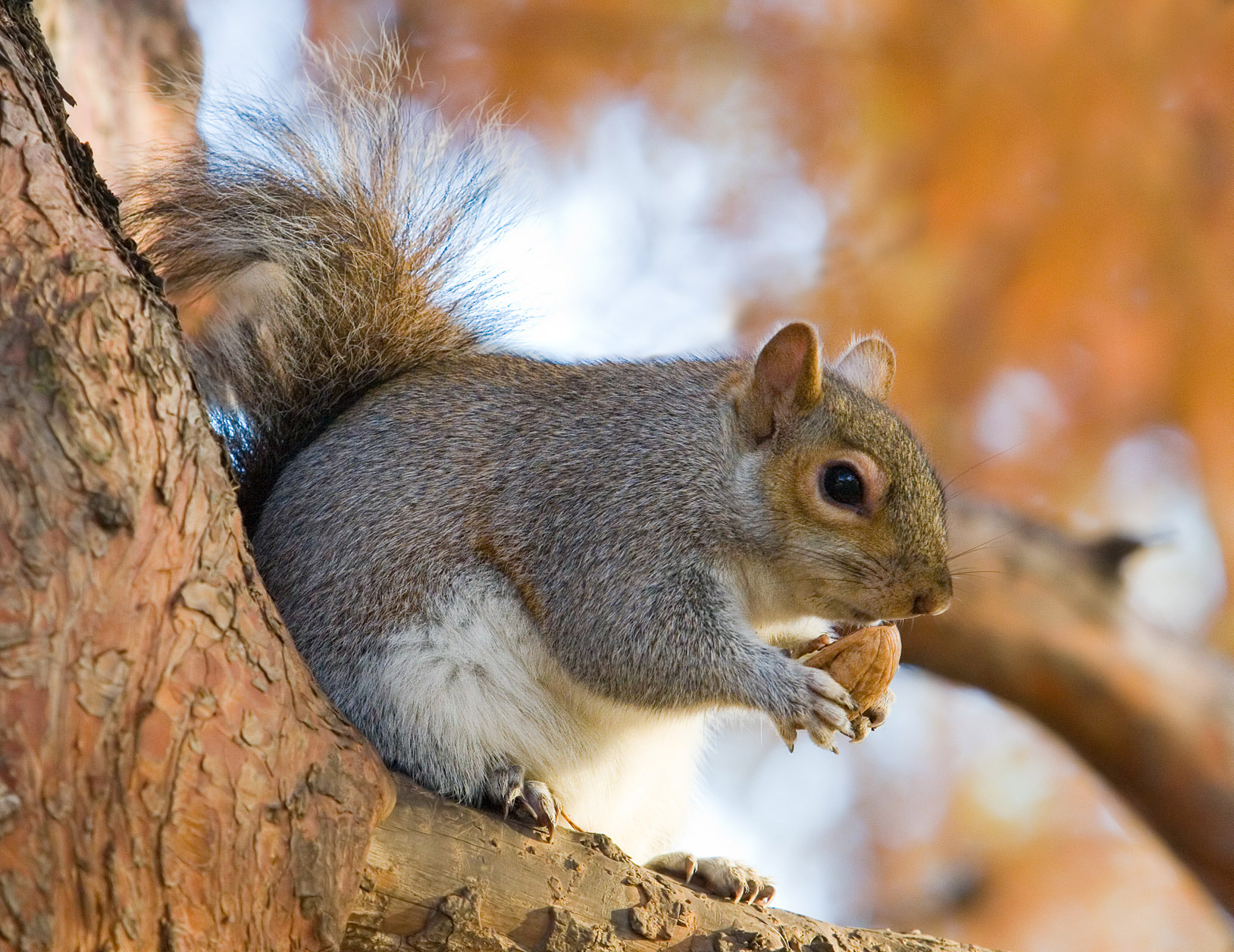
Eastern gray squirrel

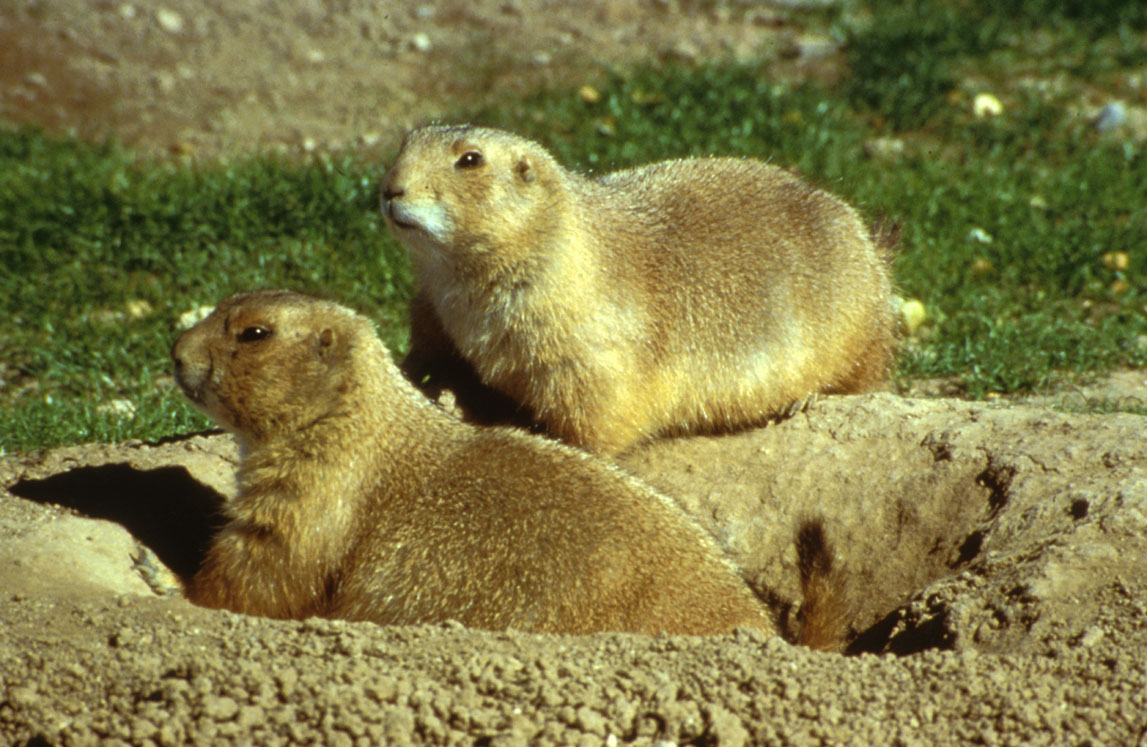
Black-tailed prairie dog

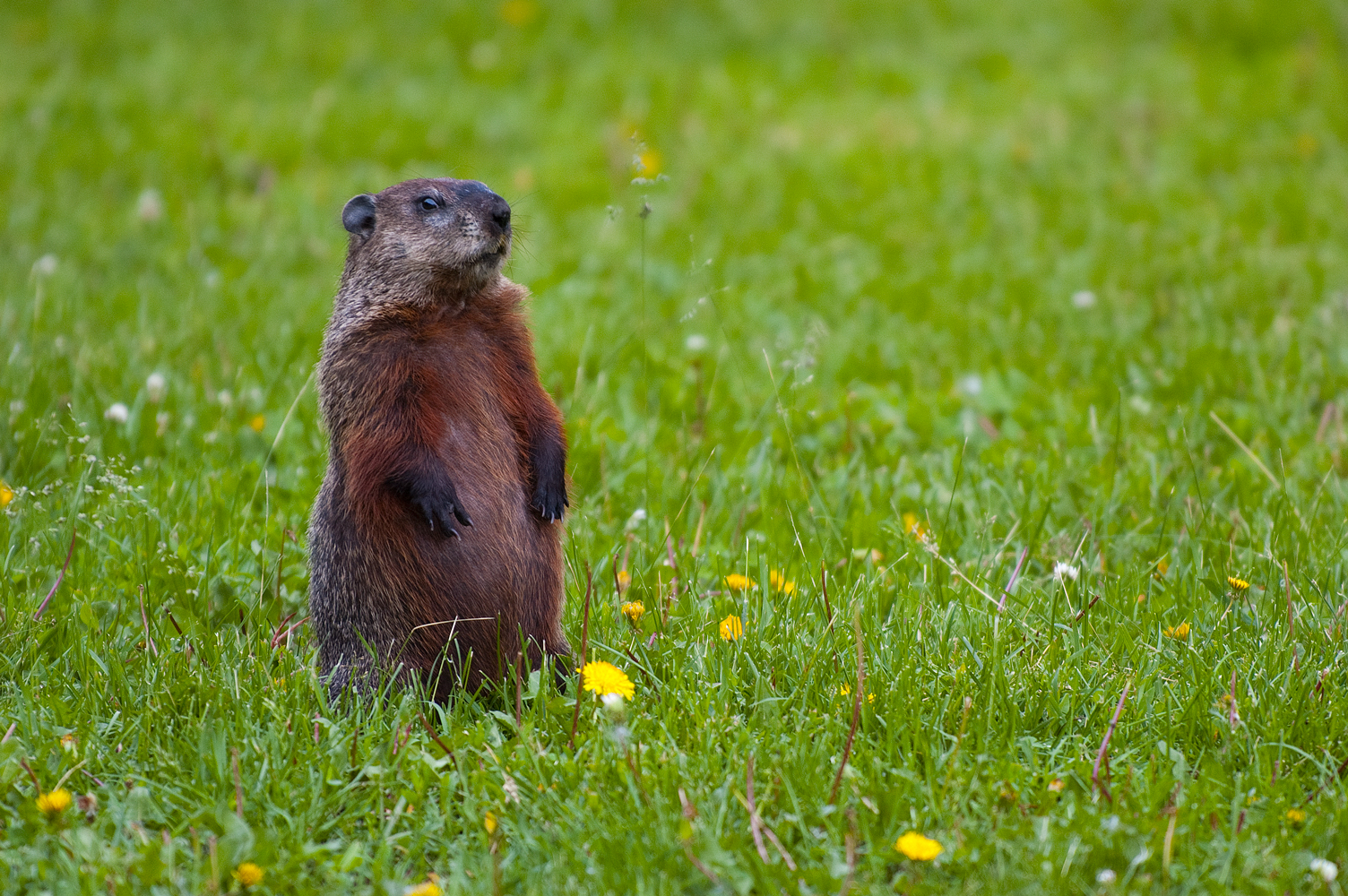
Woodchuck

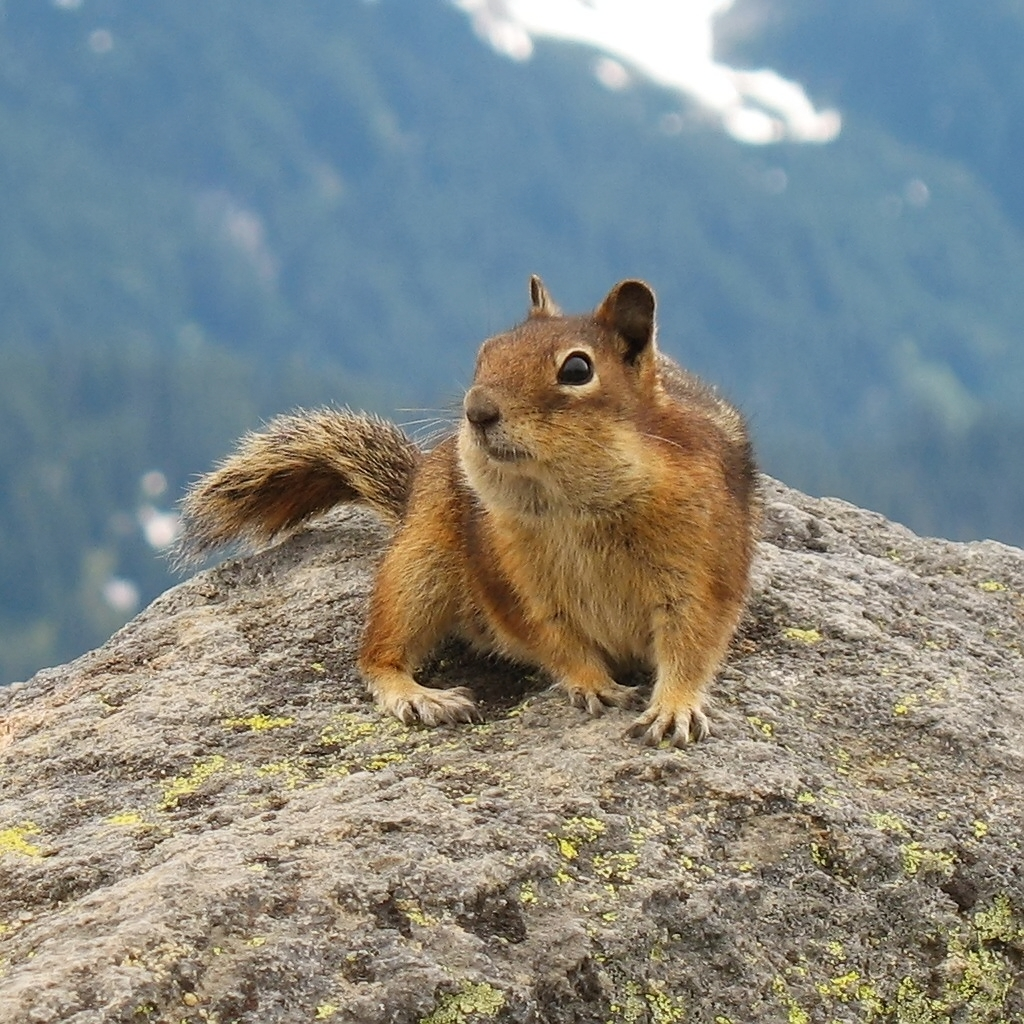
Golden-mantled ground squirrel

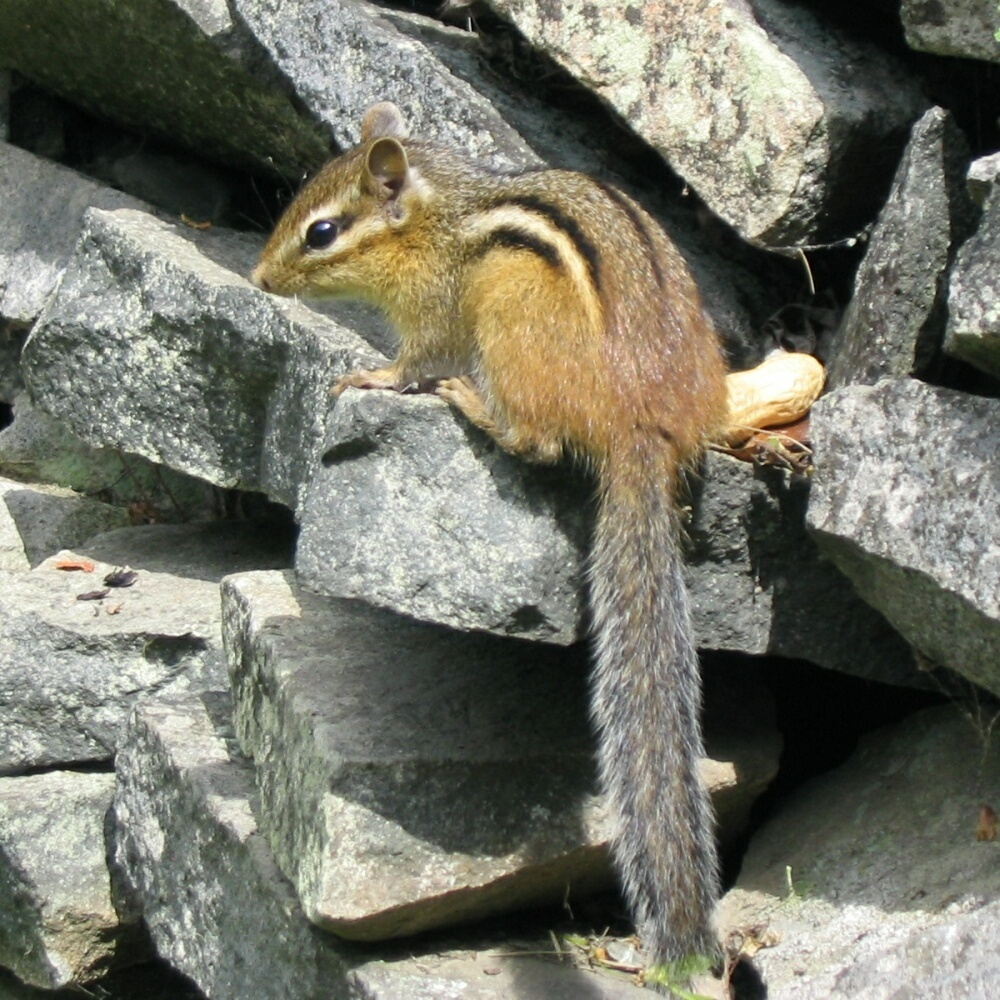
Eastern chipmunk

==== Xerinae: Marmotini (ground squirrels) ====
- Harris's antelope squirrel, Ammospermophilus harrisii LC
- Espíritu Santo antelope squirrel, Ammospermophilus insularis
- Texas antelope squirrel, Ammospermophilus interpres LC
- White-tailed antelope squirrel, Ammospermophilus leucurus (Note: Burt & Grossenheider 1976 (Peterson Field Guide) - range not clear because described separately as the nominative species but merged with another species.) LC
- San Joaquin antelope squirrel or Nelson's antelope squirrel, Ammospermophilus nelsoni EN
- Golden-mantled ground squirrel, Callospermophilus lateralis LC
- Sierra Madre ground squirrel, Callospermophilus madrensis NT
- Cascade golden-mantled ground squirrel, Callospermophilus saturatus LC
- Gunnison's prairie dog, Cynomys gunnisoni LC
- White-tailed prairie dog, Cynomys leucurus LC
- Black-tailed prairie dog, Cynomys ludovicianus LC
- Utah prairie dog, Cynomys parvidens EN T
- Mexican prairie dog, Cynomys mexicanus EN
- Mexican ground squirrel, Ictidomys mexicanus LC and:
  - Rio Grande ground squirrel, Ictidomys parvidens
- Thirteen-lined ground squirrel, Ictidomys tridecemlineatus LC
- Alaska marmot, Marmota broweri LC
- Hoary marmot, Marmota caligata LC
- Yellow-bellied marmot, Marmota flaviventris LC
- Woodchuck, Marmota monax LC
- Olympic marmot, Marmota olympus LC
- Vancouver Island marmot, Marmota vancouverensis CR E
- Alpine chipmunk, Neotamias alpinus LC
- Yellow pine chipmunk, Neotamias amoenus LC and:
  - Crater chipmunk, Neotamias cratericus
- Buller's chipmunk, Neotamias bulleri VU
- Gray-footed chipmunk, Neotamias canipes LC
- Gray-collared chipmunk, Neotamias cinereicollis LC
- Cliff chipmunk, Neotamias dorsalis LC
- Durango chipmunk, Neotamias durangae LC and:
  - Sierra del Carmen chipmunk, Neotamias solivagus
- Merriam's chipmunk, Neotamias merriami LC
- Least chipmunk, Neotamias minimus LC and:
  - Coulee chipmunk, Neotamias grisescens
- California chipmunk, Neotamias obscurus LC
- Yellow-cheeked chipmunk, Neotamias ochrogenys LC
- Palmer's chipmunk, Neotamias palmeri EN
- Panamint chipmunk, Neotamias panamintinus LC
- Long-eared chipmunk, Neotamias quadrimaculatus LC
- Colorado chipmunk, Neotamias quadrivittatus LC
- Red-tailed chipmunk, Neotamias ruficaudus LC
- Hopi chipmunk, Neotamias rufus LC
- Allen's chipmunk, Neotamias senex LC
- Siskiyou chipmunk, Neotamias siskiyou LC
- Sonoma chipmunk, Neotamias sonomae LC
- Lodgepole chipmunk, Neotamias speciosus LC
- Eastern chipmunk, Tamias striatus LC
- Townsend's chipmunk, Neotamias townsendii LC
- Uinta chipmunk, Neotamias umbrinus LC
- Tropical ground squirrel, Notocitellus adocetus LC
- Ring-tailed ground squirrel, Notocitellus annulatus LC
- Baja California rock squirrel, Otospermophilus atricapillus EN
- California ground squirrel, Otospermophilus beecheyi LC and:
  - Douglas's ground squirrel, Otospermophilus douglasii
- Rock squirrel, Otospermophilus variegatus LC
- Franklin's ground squirrel, Poliocitellus franklinii LC
- Uinta ground squirrel, Urocitellus armatus LC
- Belding's ground squirrel, Urocitellus beldingi LC
- Northern Idaho ground squirrel, Urocitellus brunneus EN and:
  - Southern Idaho ground squirrel, Urocitellus endemicus VU
- Columbian ground squirrel, Urocitellus columbianus LC
- Wyoming ground squirrel, Urocitellus elegans LC
- Arctic ground squirrel, Urocitellus parryii LC
- Richardson's ground squirrel, Urocitellus richardsonii LC
- Townsend's ground squirrel, Urocitellus townsendii VU
  - Townsend's ground squirrel, Urocitellus (townsendii) nancyae VU
- Merriam's ground squirrel, Urocitellus canus LC
- Piute ground squirrel, Urocitellus mollis LC
- Washington ground squirrel, Urocitellus washingtoni NT
- Mohave ground squirrel, Xerospermophilus mohavensis NT
- Perote ground squirrel, Xerospermophilus perotensis EN
- Spotted ground squirrel, Xerospermophilus spilosoma LC
- Round-tailed ground squirrel, Xerospermophilus tereticaudus LC

==== Sciurinae: Pteromyini (flying squirrels) ====
- Northern flying squirrel, Glaucomys sabrinus LC

(Carolina northern flying squirrel G. s. coloratus and Virginia northern flying squirrel G. s. fuscus: E)

- Humboldt's flying squirrel, Glaucomys oregonensis NE
- Southern flying squirrel, Glaucomys volans LC

==== Sciurinae: Sciurini ====
- Central American dwarf squirrel, Microsciurus alfari LC
- Western dwarf squirrel, Microsciurus mimulus LC
- Abert's squirrel, Sciurus aberti LC
- Allen's squirrel, Sciurus alleni LC
- Arizona gray squirrel, Sciurus arizonensis DD
- Mexican gray squirrel, Sciurus aureogaster (Note: Baker et al. 2003, Kays & Wilson 2002, IUCN Red List.) LC
- Eastern gray squirrel, Sciurus carolinensis LC
- Collie's squirrel, Sciurus colliaei LC
- Deppe's squirrel, Sciurus deppei LC
- Red-tailed squirrel, Sciurus granatensis LC and:
  - Richmond's squirrel, Sciurus richmondi NT
- Western gray squirrel, Sciurus griseus LC
- Mexican fox squirrel, Sciurus nayaritensis (Note: Mexican fox squirrel, Sciurus nayaritensis: Baker et al. 2003, Kays & Wilson 2002, North American Mammals NMNH SI, Mammal Species of the World (MSW3), IUCN Red List. Burt & Grossenheider 1976 (Peterson Field Guide) - only as Apache fox squirrel S. apache.) LC
- Fox squirrel, Sciurus niger LC

(Delmarva fox squirrel, S. n. cinereus: E)

- Peters's squirrel, Sciurus oculatus LC
- Variegated squirrel, Sciurus variegatoides LC
- Yucatan squirrel, Sciurus yucatanensis LC
- Bangs's mountain squirrel, Syntheosciurus brochus NT
- Douglas squirrel, Tamiasciurus douglasii LC
  - Mearn's squirrel, T. d. mearnsi EN
- Southwestern red squirrel, Tamiasciurus fremonti NE

(Mount Graham red squirrel, T. f. grahamensis: E)

- North American red squirrel, Tamiasciurus hudsonicus LC

(Mount Graham red squirrel, T. h. grahamensis: E)

=== Cricetidae ===
There has been much debate among taxonomists about which races of mice and voles should be recognized as full species, and the following list cannot be regarded as definitive.

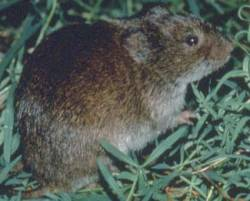
Eastern meadow vole

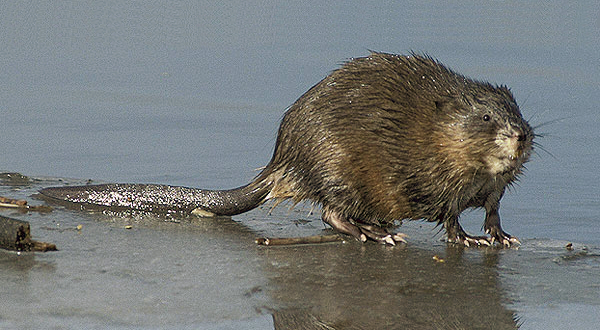
Muskrat

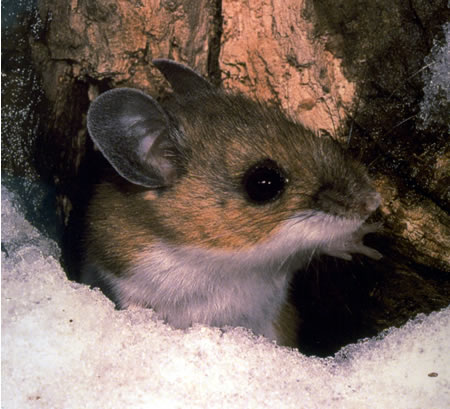
Deer mouse

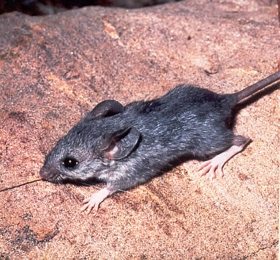
Cactus mouse

==== Arvicolinae ====
- Root vole, Alexandromys oeconomus LC
- White-footed vole, Arborimus albipes LC
- Red tree vole, Arborimus longicaudus NT
- California red tree mouse, Arborimus pomo NT
- Western red-backed vole, Clethrionomys californicus LC
- Southern red-backed vole, Clethrionomys gapperi LC
- Northern red-backed vole, Clethrionomys rutilus LC
- Northern collared lemming, Dicrostonyx groenlandicus (Note: Northern collared lemming, Dicrostonyx groenlandicus: Kays & Wilson 2002, North American Mammals NMNH SI, Mammal Species of the World (MSW3), IUCN Red List. Baker et al. 2003 - as 3 distinct species: Peary Land collared lemming D. groenlandicus, Bering collared lemming D. rubricatus and Victoria collared lemming D. kilangmiutak Burt & Grossenheider 1976 (Peterson Field Guide), - described separately as the nominative species but merged with D. exsul.) LC
- Ungava collared lemming, Dicrostonyx hudsonius EN
- Richardson's collared lemming, Dicrostonyx richardsoni LC
- Nelson's collared lemming, Dicrostonyx nelsoni (Note: Nelson's collared lemming, Dicrostonyx nelsoni: Mammal Species of the World (MSW3), IUCN Red List. Baker et al. 2003 - as 2 distinct species: Nelson's collared lemming D. nelsoni and St. Lawrence Island collared lemming D. exsul. Burt & Grossenheider 1976 (Peterson Field Guide), - mentioned only in the description of D. groenlandicus as possible split (D. exsul).) LC
- Ogilvie Mountains collared lemming, Dicrostonyx nunatakensis (Note: Baker et al. 2003, Mammal Species of the World (MSW3), IUCN Red List.) LC
- Unalaska collared lemming, Dicrostonyx unalascensis DD
- Sagebrush vole, Lemmiscus curtatus LC
- Nearctic brown lemming, Lemmus trimucronatus LC and:
  - Beringian brown lemming, Lemmus nigripes
- Insular vole, Microtus abbreviatus LC and:
  - Singing vole, Microtus miurus LC
- California vole, Microtus californicus LC

(ssp. scirpen: E)

- Gray-tailed vole, Microtus canicaudus LC
- Rock vole, Microtus chrotorrhinus LC
- Western meadow vole, Microtus drummondii NE
- Florida salt marsh vole, Microtus dukecampbelli E
- Guatemalan vole, Microtus guatemalensis NT
- Long-tailed vole, Microtus longicaudus LC
- Mexican vole, Microtus mexicanus (Note: Mexican vole, Microtus mexicanus: Burt & Grossenheider 1976 (Peterson Field Guide), Mammal Species of the World (MSW3), IUCN Red List - M. mexicanus. Baker et al. 2003, Kays & Wilson 2002 - only M. mogollonensis. North American Mammals NMNH SI - M. mexicanus listed, but only M. mexicanus mogollensis (Arizona and New Mexico) described in "Mexican Vole (Microtus mexicanus)" chapter. IUCN Red List - M. mexicanus sometimes split in two species: M. mexicanus and M. mogollonensis. 12 subspecies are recognized, 4 occur in the USA (1991), Hualapai Mexican vole M. m. hualpaiensis is listed as endangered (E) under the Endangered Species Act.) LC
  (including M. mogollonensis: LC, ssp. hualpaiensis: E) and:
  - Mogollon vole, Microtus mogollonensis
- Montane vole, Microtus montanus LC
- Prairie vole, Microtus ochrogaster LC
- Creeping vole, Microtus oregoni LC
- Eastern meadow vole, Microtus pennsylvanicus LC and:
  - Beach vole, M. p. breweri (Note: Baker et al. 2003, Kays & Wilson 2002, North American Mammals NMNH SI, IUCN Red List.) VU
  - Western meadow vole, Microtus drummondii (M. p. dukecampbelli: E)
  - Florida salt marsh vole, Microtus dukecampbelli
- Woodland vole, Microtus pinetorum LC
- Water vole, Microtus richardsoni LC
- Tarabundi vole, Microtus oaxacensis EN
- Townsend's vole, Microtus townsendii LC
- Jalapan pine vole, Microtus quasiater NT
- Zempoaltépec vole, Microtus umbrosus EN
- Taiga vole, Microtus xanthognathus LC
- Round-tailed muskrat, Neofiber alleni LC
- Muskrat, Ondatra zibethicus LC
- Western heather vole, Phenacomys intermedius LC
- Eastern heather vole, Phenacomys ungava LC
- Northern bog lemming, Synaptomys borealis LC
- Southern bog lemming, Synaptomys cooperi LC

==== Neotominae ====
- Mexican pygmy mouse, Baiomys musculus LC and:
  - Southern pygmy mouse, Baiomys brunneus
- Northern pygmy mouse, Baiomys taylori LC
- Chinanteco deer mouse, Habromys chinanteco CR
- Delicate deer mouse, Habromys delicatulus EN
- Ixtlán deer mouse, Habromys ixtlani CR
- Zempoaltepec deer mouse, Habromys lepturus CR
- Crested-tailed deer mouse, Habromys lophurus NT
- Habromys schmidlyi CR
- Jico deer mouse, Habromys simulatus EN
- Oaxacan big-toothed deermouse, Megadontomys cryophilus EN
- Nelson's big-toothed deermouse, Megadontomys nelsoni EN
- Thomas's big-toothed deermouse, Megadontomys thomasi EN
- Goldman's diminutive woodrat, Nelsonia goldmani EN
- Diminutive woodrat, Nelsonia neotomodon NT
- Anthony's woodrat, Neotoma anthonyi (E)
- White-throated woodrat, Neotoma albigula LC and:
  - Black-tailed woodrat, Neotoma melanura
- Tamaulipan woodrat, Neotoma angustapalata NT
- Bryant's woodrat, Neotoma bryanti LC
- Bunker's woodrat, Neotoma bunkeri (E)
- Nicaraguan woodrat, Neotoma chrysomelas LC
- Bushy-tailed woodrat, Neotoma cinerea LC
- Arizona woodrat, Neotoma devia LC
- Eastern woodrat, Neotoma floridana LC

(Key Largo woodrat, N. f. smalli: E)

- Dusky-footed woodrat, Neotoma fuscipes LC

(ssp. riparia: E)

- Goldman's woodrat, Neotoma goldmani LC
- Desert woodrat, Neotoma lepida LC and:
  - Angel de la Guarda woodrat, Neotoma insularis DD
- White-toothed woodrat, Neotoma leucodon LC
- Big-eared woodrat, Neotoma macrotis LC
- Allegheny woodrat, Neotoma magister NT
- San Martín Island woodrat, Neotoma martinensis (E)
- Mexican woodrat, Neotoma mexicana LC and:
  - Guatemala woodrat, Neotoma ferruginea
  - Painted woodrat, Neotoma picta
- Nelson's woodrat, Neotoma nelsoni CR
- Southern Plains woodrat, Neotoma micropus LC
- Bolaños woodrat, Neotoma palatina VU
- Sonoran woodrat, Neotoma phenax LC
- Stephen's woodrat, Neotoma stephensi LC
- Volcano deermouse, Neotomodon alstoni LC
- Golden mouse, Ochrotomys nuttalli LC
- Mearn's grasshopper mouse, Onychomys arenicola LC
- Northern grasshopper mouse, Onychomys leucogaster LC
- Southern grasshopper mouse, Onychomys torridus LC
- Osgood's deermouse, Osgoodomys banderanus LC
- Peromyscus anayapahensis (E)
- Texas mouse, Peromyscus attwateri LC
- Aztec mouse, Peromyscus aztecus LC and:
  - Cordillera deermouse, Peromyscus cordillerae
- Baker's deermouse, Peromyscus bakeri
- Brush mouse, Peromyscus boylii LC
- Orizaba deermouse, Peromyscus beatae LC
- Perote deermouse, Peromyscus bullatus CR
- California mouse, Peromyscus californicus LC
- Monserrat Island deermouse, Peromyscus caniceps CR
- Carleton's deermouse, Peromyscus carletoni
- Carol Patton's deermouse, Peromyscus carolpattonae
- Canyon mouse, Peromyscus crinitus LC
- Dickey's deermouse, Peromyscus dickeyi CR
- Southern rock deermouse, Peromyscus difficilis LC or:
  - Oaxacan rock deermouse, Peromyscus amplus
  - Felipe's rock deermouse, Peromyscus felipensis
- Ensink's deermouse, Peromyscus ensinki
- Cactus mouse, Peromyscus eremicus LC
- Southern baja deermouse, Peromyscus eva LC
- Northern Baja deer mouse, Peromyscus fraterculus LC
- Blackish deermouse, Peromyscus furvus DD and:
  - Wide-rostrum deermouse, Peromyscus latirostris
- Gardner's deermouse, Peromyscus gardneri
- Cotton mouse, Peromyscus gossypinus LC

(ssp. allapaticola: E)

- Big deer mouse, Peromyscus grandis NT
- Guatemalan deer mouse, Peromyscus guatemalensis LC
- Osgood's mouse, Peromyscus gratus LC
- Greenbaum's deermouse, Peromyscus greenbaumi
- La Guarda deermouse, Peromyscus guardia CR
- Naked-eared deer mouse, Peromyscus gymnotis LC
- Hooper's deermouse, Peromyscus hooperi LC
- Transvolcanic deermouse, Peromyscus hylocetes LC
- Northwestern deer mouse, Peromyscus keeni LC
- Kilpatrick's deermouse, Peromyscus kilpatricki
- southern white-ankled mouse, Peromyscus pectoralis LC and:
  - Northern white-ankled deermouse, Peromyscus laceianus
- White-footed mouse, Peromyscus leucopus LC
- Nimble-footed mouse, Peromyscus levipes LC
- Tres Marias deermouse, Peromyscus madrensis EN
- Eastern deermouse, Peromyscus maniculatus LC and:
  - Yukon deermouse, Peromyscus arcticus
  - Gambel's deermouse, Peromyscus gambelii
  - Southern deermouse, Peromyscus labecula
  - Western deermouse, Peromyscus sonoriensis
- Mayan deermouse, Peromyscus mayensis CR
- Broad-faced deermouse, Peromyscus megalops LC
- Puebla deermouse, Peromyscus mekisturus CR
- Black-wristed deermouse, Peromyscus melanocarpus EN
- Black-eared mouse, Peromyscus melanotis LC
- Plateau deermouse, Peromyscus melanophrys LC and:
  - Tehuantepec deermouse, Peromyscus leucurus
  - Small-footed deermouse, Peromyscus micropus
  - Zamora deermouse, Peromyscus zamorae
- Black-tailed deermouse, Peromyscus melanurus EN
- Mesquite mouse, Peromyscus merriami LC
- Mexican deer mouse, Peromyscus mexicanus LC and:
  - Nicaraguan deermouse, Peromyscus nicaraguae
  - Talamancan deermouse, Peromyscus nudipes
  - Salvadorean deermouse, Peromyscus salvadorensis
- Chimoxan deermouse, Peromyscus tropicalis
- Totontepec deermouse, Peromyscus totontepecus
- Northern rock mouse, Peromyscus nasutus (Note: Northern rock mouse, Peromyscus nasutus: Burt & Grossenheider 1976 (Peterson Field Guide) - mentioned only in the description of rock mouse, Peromyscus difficilis that P. difficilis was formerly known as P. nasuts, so range is not clear because these species are merged here.) LC
- Giant island deer mouse, Peromyscus nesodytes (E)
- El Carrizo deermouse, Peromyscus ochraventer EN
- Southern white-ankled deermouse, Peromyscus pectoralis CR or:
  - Tamaulipas white-ankled deermouse, Peromyscus collinus
- Pemberton's deermouse, Peromyscus pembertoni (E) EX
- Tawny deermouse, Peromyscus perfulvus LC and:
  - Jalisco deermouse, Peromyscus chrysopus
- Oldfield mouse, Peromyscus polionotus LC

(Choctawhatchee beach mouse, P. p. allophrys, Perdido Key beach mouse, P. p. trissyllepsis, St. Andrews beach mouse, P. p. peninsularis, Alabama beach mouse, P. p. ammobates and Anastasia Island beach mouse, P. p. phasma: E, Southeastern beach mouse, P. p. niveiventris: T)

- Chihuahuan deermouse, Peromyscus polius NT
- Purepechus deermouse, Peromyscus purepechus
- La Palma field mouse, Peromyscus sagax DD
- Schmidly's deer mouse, Peromyscus schmidlyi LC
- Santa Cruz mouse, Peromyscus sejugis EN
- Nayarit mouse, Peromyscus simulus VU
- Slevin's mouse, Peromyscus slevini CR
- Gleaning mouse, Peromyscus spicilegus LC
- San Esteban Island mouse, Peromyscus stephani CR
- Stirton's deermouse, Peromyscus stirtoni LC
- Pinyon mouse, Peromyscus truei LC
- Winkelmann's mouse, Peromyscus winkelmanni EN
- Yucatan deer mouse, Peromyscus yucatanicus LC
- Chiapan deer mouse, Peromyscus zarhynchus VU
- Florida mouse, Podomys floridanus NT
- Short-nosed harvest mouse, Reithrodontomys brevirostris LC
- Sonoran harvest mouse, Reithrodontomys burti DD
- Volcano harvest mouse, Reithrodontomys chrysopsis LC
- Talamancan harvest mouse, Reithrodontomys creper LC
- Darien harvest mouse, Reithrodontomys darienensis LC
- Fulvous harvest mouse, Reithrodontomys fulvescens LC
- Slender harvest mouse, Reithrodontomys gracilis LC
- Hairy harvest mouse, Reithrodontomys hirsutus VU
- Eastern harvest mouse, Reithrodontomys humulis LC
- Western harvest mouse, Reithrodontomys megalotis LC
- Small-toothed harvest mouse, Reithrodontomys microdon LC and:
  - Oaxacan highlands harvest mouse, Reithrodontomys albilabris
- Mexican harvest mouse, Reithrodontomys mexicanus LC and:
  - Costa Rican harvest mouse, Reithrodontomys cherrii
  - Chiriquian harvest mouse, Reithrodontomys garichensis
- Plains harvest mouse, Reithrodontomys montanus LC
- Musser's harvest mouse, Reithrodontomys musseri DD
- Nicaraguan harvest mouse, Reithrodontomys paradoxus DD
- Salt marsh harvest mouse, Reithrodontomys raviventris EN E
- Rodriguez's harvest mouse, Reithrodontomys rodriguezi LC
- Cozumel harvest mouse, Reithrodontomys spectabilis CR
- Sumichrast's harvest mouse, Reithrodontomys sumichrasti LC
- Narrow-nosed harvest mouse, Reithrodontomys tenuirostris EN
- Wagner's harvest mouse, Reithrodontomys wagneri
- Zacatecan harvest mouse, Reithrodontomys zacatecae LC
- Alston's brown mouse, Scotinomys teguina LC
- Chiriqui brown mouse, Scotinomys xerampelinus LC
- Magdalena woodrat, Xenomys nelsoni EN

==== Sigmodontinae ====
- Lesser Antillean rice rat, Antillomys rayi (E)
- Hummelinck's vesper mouse, Calomys hummelincki LC
- Alfaro's rice rat, Handleyomys alfaroi LC
- Chapman's rice rat, Handleyomys chapmani VU
  - Guerrero rice rat, Handleyomys guerrerensis
- Black-eared rice rat, Handleyomys melanotis LC
- Highland rice rat, Handleyomys rhabdops EN
- Long-nosed rice rat, Handleyomys rostratus LC
- Cloud forest rice rat, Handleyomys saturatior LC
- Allen's woodrat, Hodomys alleni LC
- Azara's rice rat, Hylaeamys megacephalus LC
- Tweedy's crab-eating rat, Ichthyomys tweedii LC
- Yellow isthmus rat, Isthmomys flavidus LC
- Mount Pirri isthmus rat, Isthmomys pirrensis NT
- Dusky rice rat, Melanomys caliginosus LC or:
  - Black-and-yellow rice rat, Melanomys chrysomelas
  - Cinnamon-rufous rice rat, Melanomys idoneus
- Martinique giant rice rat, Megalomys desmarestii (E) EX
- Barbados giant rice rat, Megalomys georginae (E)
- Saint Lucia giant rice rat, Megalomys luciae (E) EX
- Painted bristly mouse, Neacomys pictus DD
- Northern akodont, Necromys urichi LC
- Trinidad water rat, Nectomys palmipes LC
- Boquete rice rat, Nephelomys devius LC
- White-throated rice rat, Nephelomys albigularis LC or:
  - Mount Pirre rice rat, Nephelomys pirrensis
- Savanna arboreal rice rat, Oecomys speciosus LC
- Trinidad arboreal rice rat, Oecomys trinitatis LC
- White-bellied arboreal rice rat, Oecomys bicolor LC
- Fulvous pygmy rice rat, Oligoryzomys fulvescens LC and:
  - Costa Rican pygmy rice rat, Oligoryzomys costaricensis
  - Delicate pygmy rice rat, Oligoryzomys delicatus
- Sprightly pygmy rice rat, Oligoryzomys vegetus LC
- St. Vincent pygmy rice rat, Oligoryzomys victus (E) EX
- Jamaican rice rat, Oryzomys antillarum (E) EX
- Coues's rice rat, Oryzomys couesi LC and:
  - White-bellied marsh rice rat, Oryzomys albiventer
- Nicaraguan marsh rice rat, Oryzomys dimidiatus DD
- Nelson's rice rat, Oryzomys nelsoni (E) EX
- Common marsh rice rat, Oryzomys palustris (Note: Burt & Grossenheider 1976 (Peterson Field Guide) - described separately as the nominative species but probably merged with another species.) LC (ssp. natator: E) and:
  - Texas marsh rice rat, Oryzomys texensis
- Mexican water mouse, Rheomys mexicanus EN
- Goldman's water mouse, Rheomys raptor LC
- Thomas's water mouse, Rheomys thomasi NT
- Underwood's water mouse, Rheomys underwoodi LC
- Broad-footed climbing rat, Rhipidomys latimanus LC
- Coues's climbing rat, Rhipidomys couesi LC
- Splendid climbing rat, Rhipidomys nitela LC
- Venezuelan climbing mouse, Rhipidomys venezuelae LC
- Allen's cotton rat, Sigmodon alleni VU
- Burmeister's cotton rat, Sigmodon hirsutus LC
- Hispid cotton rat, Sigmodon hispidus LC
- White-eared cotton rat, Sigmodon leucotis LC
- Yellow-nosed cotton rat, Sigmodon ochrognathus LC
- Arizona cotton rat, Sigmodon arizonae LC
- Tawny-bellied cotton rat, Sigmodon fulviventer LC
- Jaliscan cotton rat, Sigmodon mascotensis LC
- Miahuatlán cotton rat, Sigmodon planifrons EN
- Toltec cotton rat, Sigmodon toltecus LC
- Montane cotton rat, Sigmodon zanjonensis
- Alfaro's water rat, Sigmodontomys alfari LC
- Bolivar rice rat, Transandinomys bolivaris LC
- Talamancan rice rat, Transandinomys talamancae LC
- Nevis rice rat, Pennatomys nivalis (E) EX
- Harris's rice rat, Tanyuromys aphrastus DD
- Short-tailed cane rat, Zygodontomys brevicauda LC

==== Tylomyinae ====
- Sumichrast's vesper rat, Nyctomys sumichrasti LC
- Yucatán vesper rat, Otonyctomys hatti LC
- La Pera climbing rat, Ototylomys chiapensis
- Big-eared climbing rat, Ototylomys phyllotis LC
- Chiapan climbing rat, Tylomys bullaris CR
- Fulvous-bellied climbing rat, Tylomys fulviventer DD
- Peters's climbing rat, Tylomys nudicaudus LC
- Panamanian climbing rat, Tylomys panamensis DD
- Tumbala climbing rat, Tylomys tumbalensis CR
- Watson's climbing rat, Tylomys watsoni LC

== Primates ==
=== Aotidae (night monkeys) ===
- Panamanian night monkey, Aotus zonalis NT
- Hispaniola monkey, Antillothrix bernensis (E)
- Haitian monkey, Insulacebus toussaintiana (E)
- Paralouatta marianae (E)
- Paralouatta varonai (E)
- Jamaican monkey, Xenothrix mcgregori (E) EX

=== Atelidae ===
- Ursine red howler, Alouatta arctoidea LC
- Coiba Island howler, Alouatta coibensis EN
- Guyanan red howler, Alouatta macconnelli LC
- Mantled howler, Alouatta palliata VU
- Guatemalan black howler, Alouatta pigra EN
- Black-headed spider monkey, Ateles fusciceps EN
- Geoffroy's spider monkey, Ateles geoffroyi EN

=== Callitrichidae ===
- Geoffroy's tamarin, Saguinus geoffroyi NT

=== Cebidae ===
- Brown weeper capuchin, Cebus brunneus EN
- Colombian white-faced capuchin, Cebus capucinus VU
- Panamanian white-faced capuchin, Cebus imitator VU
- Central American squirrel monkey, Saimiri oerstedii EN

=== Hominidae (great apes) ===
- Human, Homo sapiens LC

== Lagomorpha (rabbits and hares) ==
=== Leporidae (rabbits and hares) ===
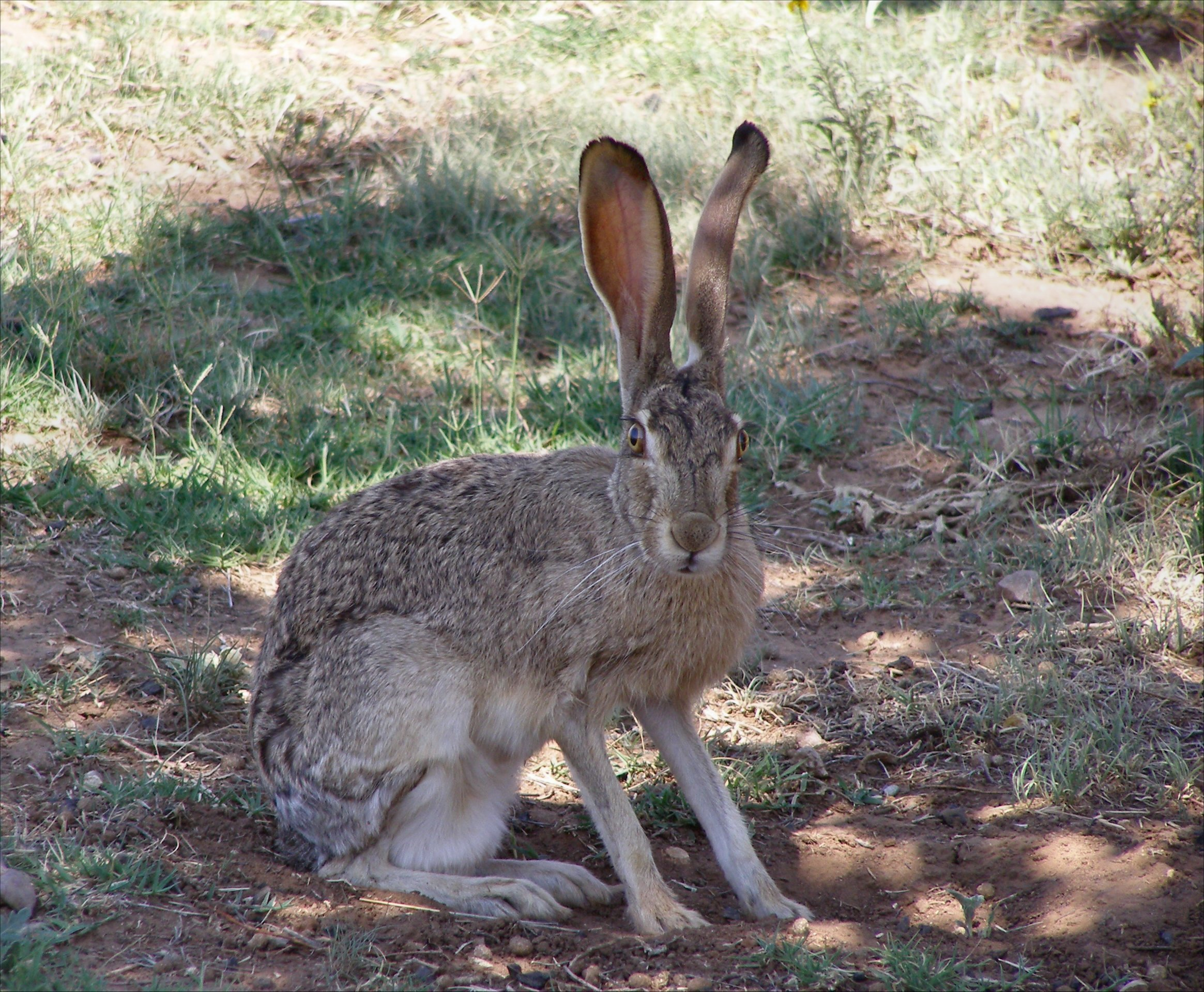
Black-tailed jackrabbit

- Atzlan rabbit, Aztlanolagus agilis (E)
- Pygmy rabbit, Brachylagus idahoensis LC E
- Antelope jackrabbit, Lepus alleni LC
- Tamaulipas jackrabbit, Lepus altamirae NE
- Snowshoe hare, Lepus americanus LC
- Arctic hare, Lepus arcticus LC
- Black-tailed jackrabbit, Lepus californicus LC
- White-sided jackrabbit, Lepus callotis VU
- Tehuantepec jackrabbit, Lepus flavigularis EN
- Black jackrabbit, Lepus insularis VU
- Alaskan hare, Lepus othus LC
- White-tailed jackrabbit, Lepus townsendii LC
- Volcano rabbit, Romerolagus diazi EN
- Swamp rabbit, Sylvilagus aquaticus LC
- Desert cottontail, Sylvilagus audubonii LC
- Brush rabbit, Sylvilagus bachmani LC (ssp. riparius: E)
- Tapeti, Sylvilagus brasiliensis EN
- Mexican cottontail, Sylvilagus cunicularius LC
- Dice's cottontail, Sylvilagus dicei VU
- Eastern cottontail, Sylvilagus floridanus LC
- Tres Marias cottontail, Sylvilagus graysoni EN
- Central American tapetí, Sylvilagus gabbi LC
- Robust cottontail, Sylvilagus holzneri (Note: Baker et al. 2003, North American Mammals NMNH SI, IUCN Red List.) VU and:
  - Manzano Mountain cottontail, Sylvilagus cognatus (Note: Mammal Species of the World (MSW3), IUCN Red List.) EN (formerly in Sylvilagus floridanus)
  - Robust cottontail, Sylvilagus (holzneri) robustus VU
- Northern tapetí, Sylvilagus incitatus NE
- Omilteme cottontail, Sylvilagus insonus DD
- San José brush rabbit, Sylvilagus mansuetus CR
- Marsh rabbit, Sylvilagus palustris LC

(Lower Keys marsh rabbit, S. p. hefneri: E)

- Mountain cottontail, Sylvilagus nuttallii LC
- Appalachian cottontail, Sylvilagus obscurus NT
- New England cottontail, Sylvilagus transitionalis VU

=== Ochotonidae ===
- Collared pika, Ochotona collaris LC
- American pika, Ochotona princeps LC
- Giant pika, Ochotona whartoni (E)

== Eulipotyphla (moles and shrews) ==
=== Talpidae (moles) ===
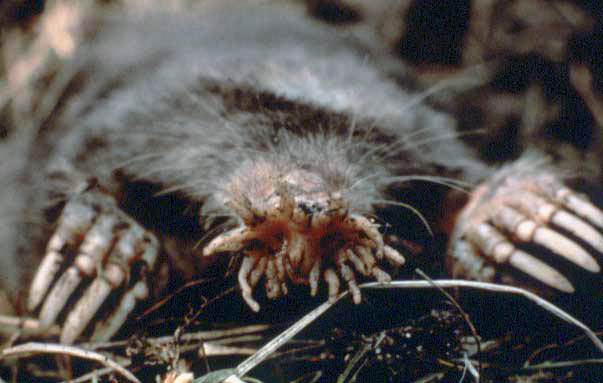
Star-nosed mole

- Star-nosed mole, Condylura cristata LC
- Hairy-tailed mole, Parascalops breweri LC
- Eastern mole, Scalopus aquaticus LC
- Northern broad-footed mole, Scapanus latimanus LC and:
  - Southern broad-footed mole, Scapanus occultus
  - Mexican mole, Scapanus anthonyi
- Coast mole, Scapanus orarius LC
- Townsend's mole, Scapanus townsendii LC
- American shrew mole, Neurotrichus gibbsii LC

=== Soricidae (shrews) ===
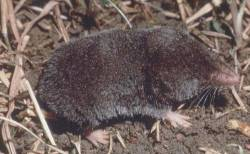
Short-tailed shrew

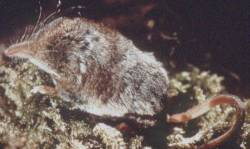
Cinerous shrew

- Northern short-tailed shrew, Blarina brevicauda LC
- Southern short-tailed shrew, Blarina carolinensis LC and:
  - Sherman's short-tailed shrew, Blarina shermani
  - Everglades short-tailed shrew, Blarina peninsulae
- Elliot's short-tailed shrew, Blarina hylophaga LC
- Central Mexican broad-clawed shrew, Cryptotis alticola DD
- Santa Barbara broad-clawed shrew, Cryptotis cavatorculus DD
- Celaque broad-clawed shrew, Cryptotis celaque DD
- Cucurucho broad-clawed shrew, Cryptotis eckerlini
- Enders's small-eared shrew, Cryptotis endersi EN
- Talamancan small-eared shrew, Cryptotis gracilis VU
- Goldman's broad-clawed shrew, Cryptotis goldmani LC
- Goodwin's broad-clawed shrew, Cryptotis goodwini LC and:
  - Honduran broad-clawed shrew, Cryptotis magnimanus
- Guatemalan broad-clawed shrew, Cryptotis griseoventris EN
- Honduran small-eared shrew, Cryptotis hondurensis DD
- Lacandona small-eared shrew, Cryptotis lacandonensis
- Muscular broad-clawed shrew, Cryptotis lacertosus DD
- Big mexican small-eared shrew, Cryptotis magnus VU
- Mam broad-clawed shrew, Cryptotis mam DD
- Mataquescuintla broad-clawed shrew, Cryptotis matsoni
- Yucatan small-eared shrew, Cryptotis mayensis LC
- Omoa broad-clawed shrew, Cryptotis mccarthyi DD
- Merriam's small-eared shrew, Cryptotis merriami LC
- Darien small-eared shrew, Cryptotis merus EN
- Small Mexican small-eared shrew, Cryptotis mexicanus LC
- Montecristo broad-clawed shrew, Cryptotis montecristo
- Monteverde small-eared shrew, Cryptotis monteverdensis
- Nelson's small-eared shrew, Cryptotis nelsoni CR
- Blackish small-eared shrew, Cryptotis nigrescens LC
- Grizzled Mexican small-eared shrew, Cryptotis obscura LC
- Central American least shrew, Cryptotis orophilus DD
- Tropical small-eared shrew, Cryptotis tropicalis DD
- North American least shrew, Cryptotis parvus LC and:
  - Berlandier's least shrew, Cryptotis berlandieri
  - Puebla least shrew, Cryptotis pueblensis
  - Mexican least shrew, Cryptotis soricinus
- Muscular broad-clawed shrew, Cryptotis lacertosus DD
- Highland broad-clawed shrew, Cryptotis oreoryctes DD
- Oaxacan broad-clawed shrew, Cryptotis peregrinus
- Phillips's small-eared shrew, Cryptotis phillipsii VU
- Mexican shrew, Megasorex gigas LC
- Cockrum's gray shrew, Notiosorex cockrumi LC
- Crawford's gray shrew, Notiosorex crawfordi LC and:
  - Ticul's gray shrew, Notiosorex tataticuli
- Large-eared gray shrew, Notiosorex evotis LC
- Villa's gray shrew, Notiosorex villai VU
- Alto shrew, Sorex altoensis
- Arctic shrew, Sorex arcticus LC
- Arizona shrew, Sorex arizonae LC
- Marsh shrew, Sorex bendirii LC
- Cinereus shrew, Sorex cinereus LC and:
  - Maryland shrew, Sorex fontinalis
  - Olympic shrew, Sorex rohweri (Note: North American Mammals NMNH SI, IUCN Red List.) LC
- Cruz's long-tailed shrew, Sorex cruzi
- Long-tailed shrew, Sorex dispar (Note: Long-tailed shrew, Sorex dispar: IUCN Red List. Baker et al. 2003, Burt & Grossenheider 1976 (Peterson Field Guide), Kays & Wilson 2002, Mammal Species of the World (MSW3), North American Mammals NMNH SI: as 2 distinct species: longtail/long-tailed shrew S. dispar and Gaspé shrew S. gaspensis.) LC and:
  - Gaspé shrew, Sorex gaspensis (Note: Gaspé shrew, Sorex gaspensis: Baker et al. 2003, Burt & Grossenheider 1976 (Peterson Field Guide), Kays & Wilson 2002, Mammal Species of the World (MSW3), North American Mammals NMNH SI)
- Zacatecas shrew, Sorex emarginatus LC
- Smoky shrew, Sorex fumeus LC
- Prairie shrew, Sorex haydeni LC
- American pygmy shrew, Sorex hoyi LC and:
  - Western pygmy shrew, Sorex eximius
- Ixtlan shrew, Sorex ixtlanensis DD
- Saint Lawrence Island shrew, Sorex jacksoni LC
- Southeastern shrew, Sorex longirostris LC
- Mount Lyell shrew, Sorex lyelli LC
- Mexican large-toothed shrew, Sorex macrodon VU
- Sierra shrew, Sorex madrensis
- Maritime shrew, Sorex maritimensis LC
- Mccarthy's shrew, Sorex mccarthyi
- Merriam's shrew, Sorex merriami LC
- Eurasian least shrew, Sorex minutissimus LC or:
  - Alaska tiny shrew, Sorex yukonicus LC
- Carmen Mountain shrew, Sorex milleri VU
- Southern montane shrew, Sorex monticola LC and:
  - Northern montane shrew, Sorex obscurus
  - New Mexico shrew, Sorex neomexicanus DD
- Mutable shrew, Sorex mutabilis
- Dwarf shrew, Sorex nanus LC
- Mexican long-tailed shrew, Sorex oreopolus LC
- Orizaba long-tailed shrew, Sorex orizabae LC
- Ornate shrew, Sorex ornatus LC (ssp. relictus: E)
- Pacific shrew, Sorex pacificus LC and:
  - Baird's shrew, Sorex bairdi LC
- American water shrew, Sorex palustris LC and:
  - Eastern water shrew, Sorex albibarbis
  - Western water shrew, Sorex navigator and:
    - Glacier Bay water shrew, Sorex alaskanus (Note: Baker et al. 2003, IUCN Red List.) DD
- Preble's shrew, Sorex preblei LC
- Pribilof Island shrew, Sorex pribilofensis EN
- Salvin's shrew, Sorex salvini
- Saussure's shrew, Sorex saussurei LC and:
  - Jalisco shrew, Sorex mediopua LC
- Sclater's shrew, Sorex sclateri CR
- Fog shrew, Sorex sonomae LC
- San Cristobal shrew, Sorex stizodon CR
- Inyo shrew, Sorex tenellus LC
- Trowbridge's shrew, Sorex trowbridgii LC
- Tundra shrew, Sorex tundrensis LC
- Barren ground shrew, Sorex ugyunak LC
- Vagrant shrew, Sorex vagrans LC
- Chestnut-bellied shrew, Sorex ventralis LC
- Veracruz shrew, Sorex veraecrucis LC
- Verapaz shrew, Sorex veraepacis LC and:
  - Chiapan shrew, Sorex chiapensis
  - Ibarra's shrew, Sorex ibarrai

=== Solenodontidae ===
- Cuban solenodon, Atopogale cubana EN
- Giant solenodon, Solenodon arredondoi (E)
- Marcano's solenodon, Solenodon marcanoi (E) EX
- Hispaniolan solenodon, Solenodon paradoxus LC

=== Nesophontidae ===
- Puerto Rican nesophontes, Nesophontes edithae (E) EX
- Nesophontes hemicingulus (E)
- Atalaye nesophontes, Nesophontes hypomicrus (E) EX
- Slender Cuban nesophontes, Nesophontes longirostris (E)
- Greater Cuban nesophontes, Nesophontes major (E) EX
- Western Cuban nesophontes, Nesophontes micrus (E) EX
- St. Michel nesophontes, Nesophontes paramicrus (E) EX
- Lesser Cuban nesophontes, Nesophontes submicrus (E)
- Cuban nesophontes, Nesophontes superstes (E)
- Haitian nesophontes, Nesophontes zamicrus (E) EX

== Chiroptera (bats) ==
=== Molossidae (free-tailed bats) ===
- Freeman's dog-faced bat, Cynomops freemani
- Greenhall's dog-faced bat, Cynomops greenhalli LC
- Mexican dog-faced bat, Cynomops mexicanus LC
- Southern dog-faced bat, Cynomops planirostris LC
- Black bonneted bat, Eumops auripendulus LC
- Wagner's mastiff bat, Eumops glaucinus LC and:
  - Florida bonneted bat, Eumops floridanus VU E
  - Fierce bonneted bat, Eumops ferox LC
- Sanborn's bonneted bat, Eumops hansae LC
- Northern dwarf bonneted bat, Eumops nanus LC
- Western mastiff bat, Eumops perotis LC
- Underwood's mastiff bat, Eumops underwoodi LC
- Alvarez's mastiff bat, Molossus alvarezi DD
- Aztec mastiff bat, Molossus aztecus LC
- Bonda mastiff bat, Molossus bondae LC
- Coiban mastiff bat, Molossus coibensis LC
- Pallas's mastiff bat, Molossus molossus (Note: Velvety free-tailed bat: Baker et al. 2003, North American Mammals NMNH SI, Mammal Species of the World (MSW3), IUCN Red List. Kays & Wilson 2002 - it is believed that colonies found in buildings in the Florida Keys were members of Molossidae.) LC and:
  - Pug-nosed mastiff bat, Molossus milleri (Bermuda)
  - Hispaniolan mastiff bat, Molossus verrilli
- Common black mastiff bat, Molossus rufus LC and:
  - Northern black mastiff bat, Molossus nigricans
- Miller's mastiff bat, Molossus pretiosus LC
- Sinaloan mastiff bat, Molossus sinaloae LC
- Least little mastiff bat, Mormopterus minutus VU
- Pocketed free-tailed bat, Nyctinomops femorosaccus LC
- Peale's free-tailed bat, Nyctinomops aurispinosus LC
- Broad-eared bat, Nyctinomops laticaudatus LC
- Big free-tailed bat, Nyctinomops macrotis LC
- Big crested mastiff bat, Promops centralis LC
- Brown mastiff bat, Promops nasutus LC
- Mexican free-tailed bat, Tadarida brasiliensis LC

=== Emballonuridae (sac-winged bats) ===
- Thomas's sac-winged bat, Balantiopteryx io VU
- Gray sac-winged bat, Balantiopteryx plicata LC
- Thomas's shaggy bat, Centronycteris centralis LC
- Chestnut sac-winged bat, Cormura brevirostris LC
- Short-eared bat, Cyttarops Alecto LC
- Northern ghost bat, Diclidurus albus LC
- Greater dog-like bat, Peropteryx kappleri LC
- Lesser doglike bat, Peropteryx macrotis LC
- Trinidad dog-like bat, Peropteryx trinitatis DD
- Proboscis bat, Rhynchonycteris naso LC
- Greater sac-winged bat, Saccopteryx bilineata LC
- Lesser sac-winged bat, Saccopteryx leptura LC

=== Natalidae (funnel-eared bats) ===
- Caribbean lesser funnel-eared bat, Chilonatalus micropus VU and:
  - Cuban lesser funnel-eared bat, Chilonatalus macer DD
- Bahamian lesser funnel-eared bat, Chilonatalus tumidifrons NT
- Jamaican greater funnel-eared bat, Natalus jamaicensis CR
- Hispaniolan greater funnel-eared bat, Natalus major NT
- Mexican greater funnel-eared bat, Natalus mexicanus LC and:
  - Woolly funnel-eared bat, Natalus lanatus
- Cuban greater funnel-eared bat, Natalus primus VU
- Lesser Antillean funnel-eared bat, Natalus stramineus LC
- Trinidadian funnel-eared bat, Natalus tumidirostris LC
- Gervais's funnel-eared bat, Nyctiellus lepidus LC

=== Vespertilionidae ===
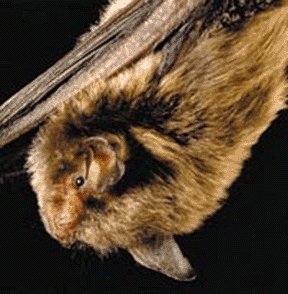
Indiana bat

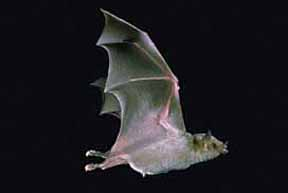
Mexican long-nosed bat

- Hoary bat, Aeorestes cinereus LC and:
  - Hawaiian hoary bat, Aeorestes semotus (L. c. semotus: E)
- Big red bat, Aeorestes egregius
- Pallid bat, Antrozous pallidus LC
- Van Gelder's bat, Bauerus dubiaquercus NT
- Brazilian brown bat, Eptesicus brasiliensis LC
- Argentine brown bat, Eptesicus furinalis LC
- Big brown bat, Eptesicus fuscus LC
- Spotted bat, Euderma maculatum LC
- Mexican big-eared bat, Corynorhinus mexicanus NT
- Rafinesque's big-eared bat, Corynorhinus rafinesquii LC
- Townsend's big-eared bat, Corynorhinus townsendii LC

(ssp. C. t. virginianus and C. t. ingens: E)

- Southern yellow bat, Dasypterus ega (Note: Baker et al. 2003, Burt & Grossenheider 1976 (Peterson Field Guide), Kays & Wilson 2002, North American Mammals NMNH SI, IUCN Red List.) LC
- Cuban yellow bat, Dasypterus insularis
- Northern yellow bat, Dasypterus intermedius LC
- Western yellow bat, Dasypterus xanthinus LC
- Chiriquinan serotine, Eptesicus chiriquinus LC
- Allen's big-eared bat, Idionycteris phyllotis LC
- Eastern red bat, Lasiurus borealis LC
- Tacarcunan bat, Lasiurus castaneus DD
- Southern red bat, Lasiurus blossevillii LC and:
  - Western red bat, Lasiurus frantzii
- Jamaican red bat, Lasiurus degelidus VU
- Minor red bat, Lasiurus minor VU
- Pfeiffer's red bat, Lasiurus pfeifferi NT
- Seminole bat, Lasiurus seminolus LC
- Sir David Attenborough's myotis, Myotis attenboroughi
- Armién's myotis, Myotis armiensis
- Silver-tipped myotis, Myotis albescens LC
- Southwestern myotis, Myotis auriculus (Note: Southwestern myotis, Myotis auriculus: Burt & Grossenheider 1976 (Peterson Field Guide) - mentioned only in the description of long-eared myotis, M. evotis as possible split, occurring in southern N. Mexico.) LC
- Southeastern myotis, Myotis austroriparius LC
- California myotis, Myotis californicus LC
- Western small-footed myotis, Myotis ciliolabrum LC and:
  - Dark-nosed small-footed myotis, Myotis melanorhinus (Note: North American Mammals NMNH SI, Mammal Species of the World (MSW3), IUCN Red List.) LC
- Guatemalan myotis, Myotis cobanensis DD
- Dominican myotis, Myotis dominicensis VU
- Long-eared myotis, Myotis evotis LC
- Elegant myotis, Myotis elegans LC
- Findley's myotis, Myotis findleyi EN
- Cinnamon myotis, Myotis fortidens LC
- Gray bat, Myotis grisescens VU E
- Keen's myotis, Myotis keenii LC
- Eastern small-footed myotis, Myotis leibii EN
- Little brown bat, Myotis lucifugus EN
- Schwartz's myotis, Myotis martiniquensis NT and:
  - Barbados myotis, Myotis nyctor VU
- Curaçao myotis, Myotis nesopolus LC
- Common black myotis, Myotis nigricans LC and:
  - Carter's myotis, Myotis carteri
- Montane myotis, Myotis oxyotus LC
- Northern hairy-legged myotis, Myotis pilosatibialis
- Flat-headed myotis, Myotis planiceps EN
- Riparian myotis, Myotis riparius LC
- Northern long-eared myotis, Myotis septentrionalis NT
- Indiana bat, Myotis sodalis NT E
- Fringed myotis, Myotis thysanodes LC
- Cave myotis, Myotis velifer LC
- Fish-eating myotis, Myotis vivesi VU
- Long-legged myotis, Myotis volans LC
- Yuma myotis, Myotis yumanensis LC
- Silver-haired bat, Lasionycteris noctivagans LC
- Arizona myotis, Myotis occultus (Note: Baker et al. 2003, Burt & Grossenheider 1976 (Peterson Field Guide), North American Mammals NMNH SI, Mammal Species of the World (MSW3), IUCN Red List.) LC
- Cuban evening bat, Nycticeius cubanus NT
- Evening bat, Nycticeius humeralis LC
- Canyon bat, Parastrellus hesperus LC
- Tricolored bat, Perimyotis subflavus VU
- Mexican big-eared bat, Plecotus mexicanus NT
- Yucatan yellow bat, Rhogeessa aenea LC
- Allen's yellow bat, Rhogeessa alleni
- Bickham's yellow bat, Rhogeessa bickhami LC
- Genoways's yellow bat, Rhogeessa genowaysi EN
- Slender yellow bat, Rhogeessa gracilis LC
- Thomas's yellow bat, Rhogeessa io LC
- Menchu's yellow bat, Rhogeessa menchuae DD
- Least yellow bat, Rhogeessa mira VU
- Little yellow bat, Rhogeessa parvula LC
- Nicaraguan little yellow bat, Rhogeessa permutandis
- Black-winged little yellow bat, Rhogeessa tumida LC

=== Mormoopidae ===
- Antillean ghost-faced bat, Mormoops blainvillei LC
- Ghost-faced bat, Mormoops megalophylla LC
- Davy's naked-backed bat, Pteronotus davyi LC and:
  - Thomas's naked-backed bat, Pteronotus fulvus
- Big naked-backed bat, Pteronotus gymnonotus LC
- Parnell's mustached bat, Pteronotus parnellii LC and:
  - Allen's common mustached bat, Pteronotus fuscus
  - Mesoamerican common mustached bat, Pteronotus mesoamericanus LC
  - Puerto rican common mustached bat, Pteronotus portoricensis
  - Mexican common mustached bat, Pteronotus mexicanus
  - Hispaniolan common mustached bat, Pteronotus pusillus
- Pristine mustached bat, Pteronotus pristinus (E) (Note: Prinstine mustached bat: Mammal Species of the World (MSW3) - possibly Florida. Extinct at the end of Pleistocene - in the USA found in Rancholabrean cave deposits in southern Florida (Monkey Jungle Hammock).)
- Macleay's mustached bat, Pteronotus macleayii LC
- Wagner's mustached bat, Pteronotus personatus LC and:
  - Dobson's lesser mustached bat, Pteronotus psilotis
- Sooty mustached bat, Pteronotus quadridens LC

=== Furipteridae ===
- Thumbless bat, Furipterus horrens LC

=== Noctilionidae (bulldog bats) ===
- Lesser bulldog bat, Noctilio albiventris LC
- Greater bulldog bat, Noctilio leporinus LC

=== Phyllostomidae (New World leaf-nosed bats) ===
==== Brachyphyllinae ====
- Antillean fruit-eating bat, Brachyphylla cavernarum LC
- Cuban fruit-eating bat, Brachyphylla nana LC

==== Carolliinae ====
- Silky short-tailed bat, Carollia brevicaudum LC
- Chestnut short-tailed bat, Carollia castanea LC
- Seba's short-tailed bat, Carollia perspicillata LC
- Sowell's short-tailed bat, Carollia sowelli LC
- Gray short-tailed bat, Carollia subrufa LC

==== Desmodontinae (vampire bats) ====
- Stock's vampire bat, Desmodus stocki (E)
- Common vampire bat, Desmodus rotundus LC
- White-winged vampire bat, Diaemus youngii LC
- Hairy-legged vampire bat, Diphylla ecaudata LC

==== Glossophaginae ====
- Handley's tailless bat, Anoura cultrata NT
- Geoffroy's tailless bat, Anoura geoffroyi LC
- Godman's long-tailed bat, Choeroniscus godmani LC
- Mexican long-tongued bat, Choeronycteris mexicana NT
- Lesser long-tailed bat, Choeroniscus minor LC
- Commissaris's long-tongued bat, Glossophaga commissarisi LC
- Gray long-tongued bat, Glossophaga leachii LC
- Miller's long-tongued bat, Glossophaga longirostris LC
- Western long-tongued bat, Glossophaga morenoi LC
- Pallas's long-tongued bat, Glossophaga soricina LC and:
  - Jamaican long-tongued bat, Glossophaga antillarum
  - Merriam's long-tongued bat, Glossophaga mutica
- Thomas's nectar bat, Hsunycteris thomasi LC
- Underwood's long-tongued bat, Hylonycteris underwoodi LC
- Southern long-nosed bat, Leptonycteris curasoae EN
- Mexican long-nosed bat, Leptonycteris nivalis EN E
- Lesser long-nosed bat, Leptonycteris yerbabuenae (Note: Lesser long-nosed bat, Leptonycteris yerbabuenae: Kays & Wilson 2002, North American Mammals NMNH SI, Mammal Species of the World (MSW3), IUCN Red List. Baker et al. 2003 - as southern long-nosed bat L. curasoae (L. yerbabuenae was included in L. curasoae as a subspecies). Burt & Grossenheider 1976 (Peterson Field Guide) - mentioned only in the description of L. nivalis under the junior synonym L. sanborni as possible split, so range is not clear here.) NT
- Dark long-tongued bat, Lichonycteris obscura LC
- Chestnut long-tongued bat, Lionycteris spurrelli LC
- Goldman's nectar bat, Lonchophylla concava NT
- Godman's nectar bat, Lonchophylla mordax LC
- Orange nectar bat, Lonchophylla robusta LC
- Insular single-leaf bat, Monophyllus plethodon LC
- Leach's single leaf bat, Monophyllus redmani LC
- Banana bat, Musonycteris harrisoni VU

==== Phyllonycterinae ====
- Brown flower bat, Erophylla bombifrons LC
- Buffy flower bat, Erophylla sezekorni LC
- Jamaican flower bat, Phyllonycteris aphylla CR
- Puerto Rican flower bat, Phyllonycteris major (E)
- Cuban flower bat, Phyllonycteris poeyi LC

==== Phyllostominae ====
- Big-eared woolly bat, Chrotopterus auritus LC
- Striped hairy-nosed bat, Gardnerycteris crenulatum LC
- Keenan's hairy-nosed bat, Gardnerycteris keenani
- Davies's big-eared bat, Glyphonycteris daviesi LC
- Tricolored big-eared bat, Glyphonycteris sylvestris LC
- Yellow-throated big-eared bat, Lampronycteris brachyotis LC
- Tomes's sword-nosed bat, Lonchorhina aurita LC
- Pygmy round-eared bat, Lophostoma brasiliense LC and:
  - Mesoamerican round-eared bat, Lophostoma nicaraguae
- Kalko's round-eared bat, Lophostoma kalkoae DD
- Davis's round-eared bat, Lophostoma evotis LC
- White-throated round-eared bat, Lophostoma silvicola LC
- Long-legged bat, Macrophyllum macrophyllum LC
- California leaf-nosed bat, Macrotus californicus LC
- Waterhouse's leaf-nosed bat, Macrotus waterhousii LC
- Saint Vincent big-eared bat, Micronycteris buriri DD
- Hairy big-eared bat, Micronycteris hirsuta LC
- Little big-eared bat, Micronycteris megalotis LC
- Common big-eared bat, Micronycteris microtis LC
- White-bellied big-eared bat, Micronycteris minuta LC
- Schmidts's big-eared bat, Micronycteris schmidtorum LC
- Northern big-eared bat, Micronycteris tresamici
- Cozumelan golden bat, Mimon cozumelae LC
- Pale-faced bat, Phylloderma stenops LC
- Pale spear-nosed bat, Phyllostomus discolor LC
- Greater spear-nosed bat, Phyllostomus hastatus LC
- Stripe-headed round-eared bat, Tonatia saurophila LC and:
  - Northern stripe-headed round-eared bat, Tonatia bakeri
  - Southern stripe-headed round-eared bat, Tonatia maresi
- Fringe-lipped bat, Trachops cirrhosus LC
- Niceforo's big-eared bat, Trinycteris nicefori LC
- Spectral bat, Vampyrum spectrum NT

==== Stenodermatinae ====
- Little white-shouldered bat, Ametrida centurio LC
- Tree bat, Ardops nichollsi LC
- Jamaican fig-eating bat, Ariteus flavescens LC
- Hairy fruit-eating bat, Artibeus hirsutus LC
- Honduran fruit-eating bat, Artibeus inopinatus DD
- Jamaican fruit bat, Artibeus jamaicensis LC and:
  - Flat-faced fruit-eating bat, Artibeus planirostris LC
  - Schwartz's fruit-eating bat, Artibeus schwartzi DD
- Great fruit-eating bat, Artibeus lituratus LC and:
  - Intermediate fruit-eating bat, Artibeus intermedius
- Wrinkle-faced bat, Centurio senex LC
- Guadeloupean big-eyed bat, Chiroderma improvisum EN
- Salvin's big-eyed bat, Chiroderma salvini LC and:
  - Mexican big-eyed bat, Chiroderma scopaeum
- Little big-eyed bat, Chiroderma trinitatum LC and:
  - Handley's big-eyed bat, Chiroderma gorgasi
- Hairy big-eyed bat, Chiroderma villosum LC
- Aztec fruit-eating bat, Dermanura azteca LC
- Bogota fruit-eating bat, Dermanura bogotensis LC
- Pygmy fruit-eating bat, Dermanura phaeotis LC
- Toltec fruit-eating bat, Dermanura tolteca LC
- Thomas's fruit-eating bat, Dermanura watsoni LC
- Honduran white bat, Ectophylla alba NT
- Velvety fruit-eating bat, Enchisthenes hartii LC
- MacConnell's bat, Mesophylla macconnelli LC
- Cuban fig-eating bat, Phyllops falcatus LC
- Darien broad-nosed bat, Platyrrhinus aquilus DD
- Choco broad-nosed bat, Platyrrhinus chocoensis VU
- Thomas's broad-nosed bat, Platyrrhinus dorsalis LC
- Brown-bellied broad-nosed bat, Platyrrhinus fusciventris LC
- Heller's broad-nosed bat, Platyrrhinus helleri LC
- Greater broad-nosed bat, Platyrrhinus vittatus LC
- Red fruit bat, Stenoderma rufum NT
- Gianna's yellow-shouldered bat, Sturnira giannae
- Little yellow-shouldered bat, Sturnira lilium LC and:
  - Dominica yellow-shouldered bat, Sturnira angeli NT
  - Northern yellow-shouldered bat, Sturnira parvidens LC
  - Paulson's yellow-shouldered bat, Sturnira paulsoni NT
- Burton's yellow-shouldered bat, Sturnira burtonlimi DD
- Highland yellow-shouldered bat, Sturnira ludovici LC and:
  - Honduran yellow-shouldered bat, Sturnira hondurensis LC
- Louis's yellow-shouldered bat, Sturnira luisi LC
- Talamancan yellow-shouldered bat, Sturnira mordax NT
- Tilda's yellow-shouldered bat, Sturnira tildae LC
- Common tent-making bat, Uroderma bilobatum LC and:
  - Pacific tent-making bat, Uroderma convexum
  - Davis's tent-making bat, Uroderma davisi
- Brown tent-making bat, Uroderma magnirostrum LC
- Kalko's yellow-eared bat, Vampyressa elisabethae
- Northern little yellow-eared bat, Vampyressa thyone LC
- Striped yellow-eared bat, Vampyriscus nymphaea LC
- Caracciolo's stripe-faced bat, Vampyrodes caraccioli LC and:
  - Great stripe-faced bat, Vampyrodes major LC

=== Thyropteridae ===
- Peters's disk-winged bat, Thyroptera discifera LC
- Spix's disk-winged bat, Thyroptera tricolor LC

== Carnivora (carnivorans) ==
=== Felidae (cats) ===
Jaguar

- Jaguarundi, Herpailurus yagouaroundi LC
- Homotherium serum (E)
- Ocelot, Leopardus pardalis LC E
- Oncilla, Leopardus tigrinus VU
- Margay, Leopardus wiedii (Note: Margay: Baker et al. 2003, Burt & Grossenheider 1976 (Peterson Field Guide), Mammal Species of the World (MSW3). Kays & Wilson 2002: last record in Texas from 1852.) NT
- Canada lynx, Lynx canadensis LC T
- Bobcat, Lynx rufus LC
- Panthera atrox (E)
- Jaguar, Panthera onca NT E

(ssp. P. o. augusta (E))

- Cougar, Puma concolor LC T(S/A)

(ssp. P. c. couguar E)

- Smilodon fatalis (E)

=== Canidae (dogs) ===
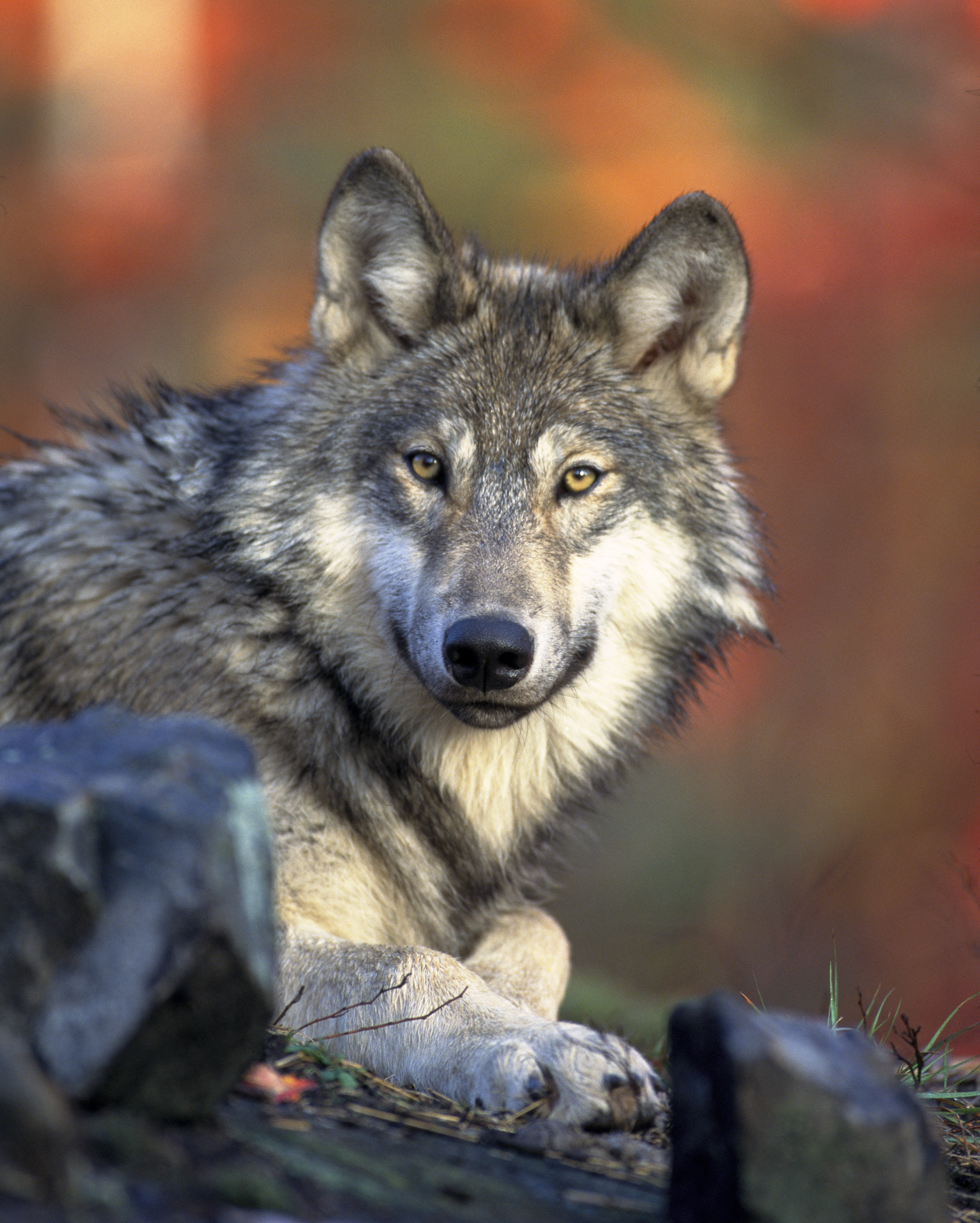
Gray wolf

- Dire wolf, Aenocyon dirus (E)
- Short-eared dog, Atelocynus microtis (A) NT
- Coyote, Canis latrans LC
- Gray wolf, Canis lupus LC E (and XN)
- Eastern wolf, Canis lycaon NE
- Red wolf, Canis rufus CR E
- Crab-eating fox, Cerdocyon thous LC
- Bush dog, Speothos venaticus NT
- Gray fox, Urocyon cinereoargenteus LC
- Island fox, Urocyon littoralis NT

(ssp. U.l. littoralis, U. l. catalinae, U. l. santarosae and U. l. santacruzae: E)

- Arctic fox, Vulpes lagopus LC
- Kit fox, Vulpes macrotis LC (ssp. mutica: E)
- Swift fox, Vulpes velox LC (ssp. hebes: E)
- Red fox, Vulpes vulpes (Note: Red fox, Vulpes vulpes: Burt & Grossenheider 1976 (Peterson Field Guide) - as North American V. fulva distinct from the Old World species V. vulpes.) LC

=== Ursidae (bears) ===
- Short-faced bear, Arctodus simus (E)
- Florida cave bear, Tremarctos floridanus (E)
- Spectacled bear, Tremarctos ornatus (A) VU
- Brown bear, Ursus arctos (Note: Brown bear, Ursus arctos: Baker et al. 2003, Kays & Wilson 2002, North American Mammals NMNH SI, Mammal Species of the World (MSW3), IUCN Red List. Burt & Grossenheider 1976 (Peterson Field Guide) - as 2 distinct species: grizzly bear, U. horribilis and Kodiak bear, U. middendorffi, also distinct from the "worldwide" species U. arctos.) LC (includes grizzly bear, U. a. horribilis: T, XN and
  Alaskan brown bear or Kodiak bear, U. a. middendorffi)
- American black bear, Ursus americanus LC T(S/A)
  (Louisiana black bear U. a. luteolus: T)
- Polar bear, Ursus maritimus VU T

=== Procyonidae ===
- Northern olingo, Bassaricyon gabbii LC
- Western lowland olingo, Bassaricyon medius LC
- Ringtail, Bassariscus astutus LC
- Cacomistle, Bassariscus sumichrasti LC
- White-nosed coati, Nasua narica LC
- Kinkajou, Potos flavus LC
- Crab-eating raccoon, Procyon cancrivorus LC
- Raccoon, Procyon lotor LC
- Cozumel raccoon, Procyon pygmaeus CR

=== Mustelidae ===
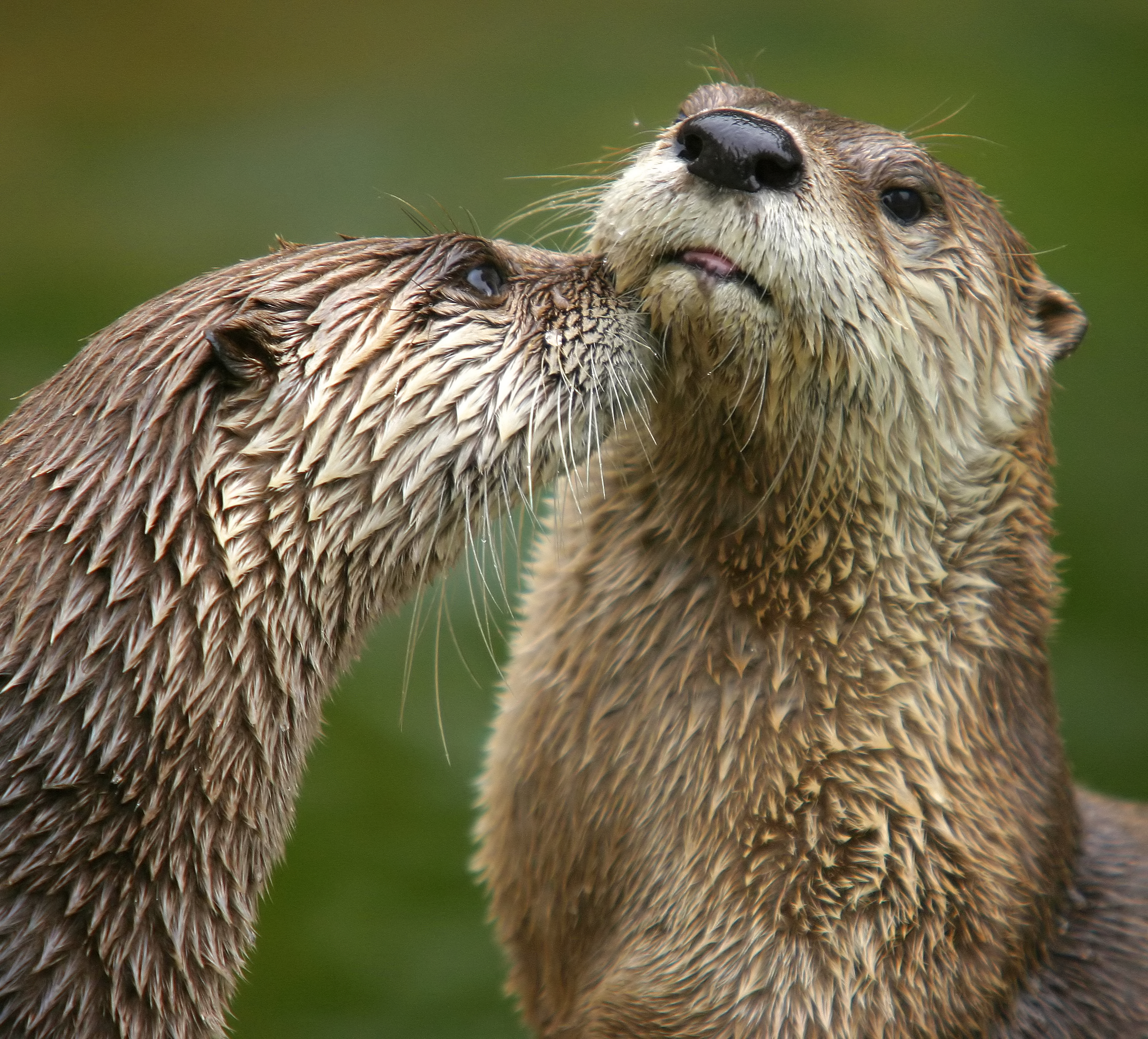
River otter

- Tayra, Eira barbara LC
- Sea otter, Enhydra lutris EN

(ssp. E. l. nereis and E. l. kenyoni: T, ssp. E. l. nereis also XN)

- Greater grison, Galictis vittata LC
- Wolverine, Gulo gulo (Note: Wolverine, Gulo gulo: Burt & Grossenheider 1976 (Peterson Field Guide) - as North American G. luscus distinct from the Old World species G. gulo.) LC
- North American river otter, Lontra canadensis LC
- Neotropical otter, Lontra longicaudis NT
- American marten, Martes americana LC and:
  - Pacific marten, Martes caurina NE
- Beringian ermine, Mustela erminea LC and:
  - Haida ermine, Mustela haidarum NE
  - American ermine, Mustela richardsonii NE
- Least weasel, Mustela nivalis (Note: Least weasel, Mustela nivalis: Burt & Grossenheider 1976 (Peterson Field Guide) - as North American M. rixosa distinct from the Old World species M. nivalis.) LC
- Black-footed ferret, Mustela nigripes EN E (and XN)
- Long-tailed weasel, Neogale frenata LC
- Sea mink, Neogale macrodon (E) EX
- American mink, Neogale vison LC
- Fisher, Pekania pennanti LC
- American badger, Taxidea taxus LC

=== Mephitidae ===
- Short-faced skunk, Brachyprotoma obtusata (E)
- American hog-nosed skunk, Conepatus leuconotus (Note: American hog-nosed skunk, Conepatus leuconotus: Baker et al. 2003, Burt & Grossenheider 1976 (Peterson Field Guide), North American Mammals NMNH SI, Mammal Species of the World (MSW3), IUCN Red List. Kays & Wilson 2002 - as 2 distinct species: eastern hog-nosed skunk C. leuconotus and western hog-nosed skunk C. mesoleucus.) LC
- Striped hog-nosed skunk, Conepatus semistriatus LC
- Striped skunk, Mephitis mephitis LC
- Hooded skunk, Mephitis macroura LC
- Southern spotted skunk, Spilogale angustifrons LC and:
  - Yucatán spotted skunk, Spilogale yucatanensis
- Western spotted skunk, Spilogale gracilis LC and:
  - Desert spotted skunk, Spilogale leucoparia
- Eastern spotted skunk, Spilogale putorius VU and:
  - Plains spotted skunk, Spilogale interrupta
- Pygmy spotted skunk, Spilogale pygmaea VU

=== Otariidae (eared seals) ===
- Galápagos fur seal, Arctocephalus galapagoensis (A) EN
- Guadalupe fur seal, Arctocephalus townsendi (Note: Guadalupe fur seal, Arctocephalus townsendi: Burt & Grossenheider 1976 (Peterson Field Guide) - as Guadalupe fur seal A. philippi, formerly A. townsendi.) LC T
- Northern fur seal, Callorhinus ursinus VU
- Steller sea lion, Eumetopias jubatus EN

(ssp. E. j. monteriensis: LC, ssp. E. j. jubatus: EN) T (except west of 144° W, where E)

- South American sea lion, Otaria flavescens (A) LC
- California sea lion, Zalophus californianus LC
- Galápagos sea lion, Zalophus wollebaeki (A) EN

=== Odobenidae ===
- Walrus, Odobenus rosmarus VU (O. r. divergens DD, O. r. rosmarus NT)

=== Phocidae (earless seals) ===
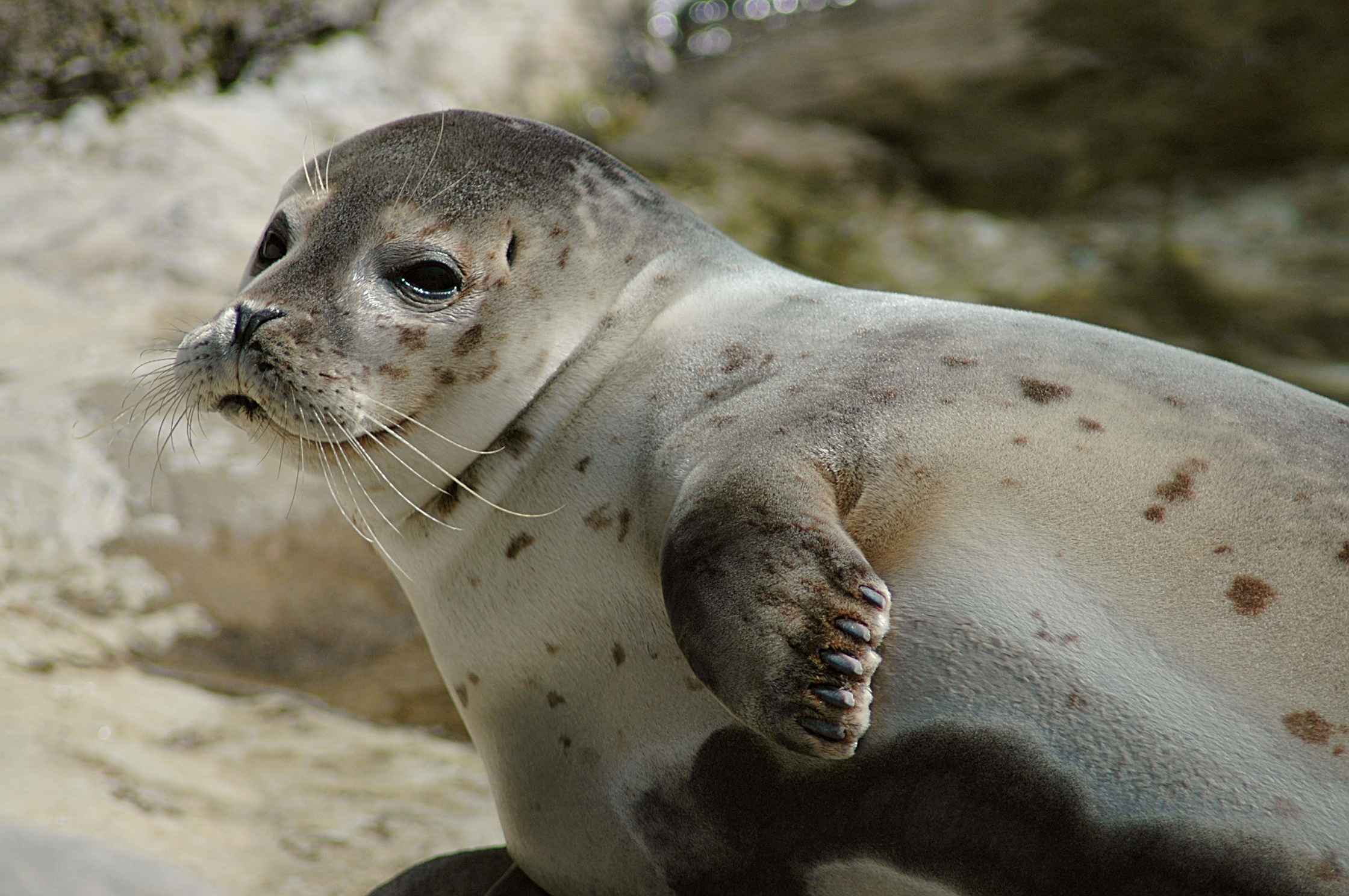
Harbor seal

- Hooded seal, Cystophora cristata EN
- Bearded seal, Erignathus barbatus LC
  (E. b. barbatus, nauticus and monteriensis LC, jubatus EN)
- Ribbon seal, Histriophoca fasciata LC
- Grey seal, Halichoerus grypus LC (H. g. grypus LC)
- Northern elephant seal, Mirounga angustirostris LC
- Southern elephant seal, Mirounga leonina (A) LC
- Caribbean monk seal, Neomonachus tropicalis (Note: Baker et al. 2003, Burt & Grossenheider 1976 (Peterson Field Guide), Kays & Wilson 2002, Mammal Species of the World (MSW3), IUCN Red List.) (E) EX
- Harbor seal, Phoca vitulina LC
  (P. v. concolor and richardii LC, mellonae EN, stejnegeri DD)
- Spotted seal, Phoca largha LC T
- Ringed seal, Pusa hispida LC (P. h. hispida LC)
- Harp seal, Pagophilus groenlandicus LC

== Perissodactyla (odd-toed ungulates) ==
=== Equidae (horse family) ===
- Equus alaskae (E)
- Mexican horse, Equus conversidens (E)
- Equus fraternus (E)
- Giant horse, Equus giganteus (E)
- Yukon wild horse, Equus lambei (E)
- Niobrara horse, Equus niobrarensis (E)
- Western horse, Equus occidentalis (E)
- Equus semiplicatus (E)
- Scott's horse, Equus scotti (E)
- Stilt-legged horse, Haringtonhippus francisci (E)

=== Tapiridae (tapirs) ===
- Baird's tapir, Tapirus bairdii EN
- California tapir, Tapirus californicus (E)
- Merriam's tapir, Tapirus merriami (E)
- South American tapir, Tapirus terrestris (A) VU
- Florida tapir, Tapirus veroensis (E)

== Artiodactyla (even-toed ungulates) ==
=== Camelidae ===
- Camelops hesternus (E)
- Stilt-legged llama, Hemiauchenia macrocephala (E)
- Stout-legged llama, Palaeolama mirifica (E)

=== Tayassuidae ===
- Long-nosed peccary, Mylohyus nasutus (E)
- Collared peccary, Dicotyles tajacu LC
- Flat-headed peccary, Platygonus compressus (E)
- White-lipped peccary, Tayassu pecari VU

=== Bovidae (bovids) ===
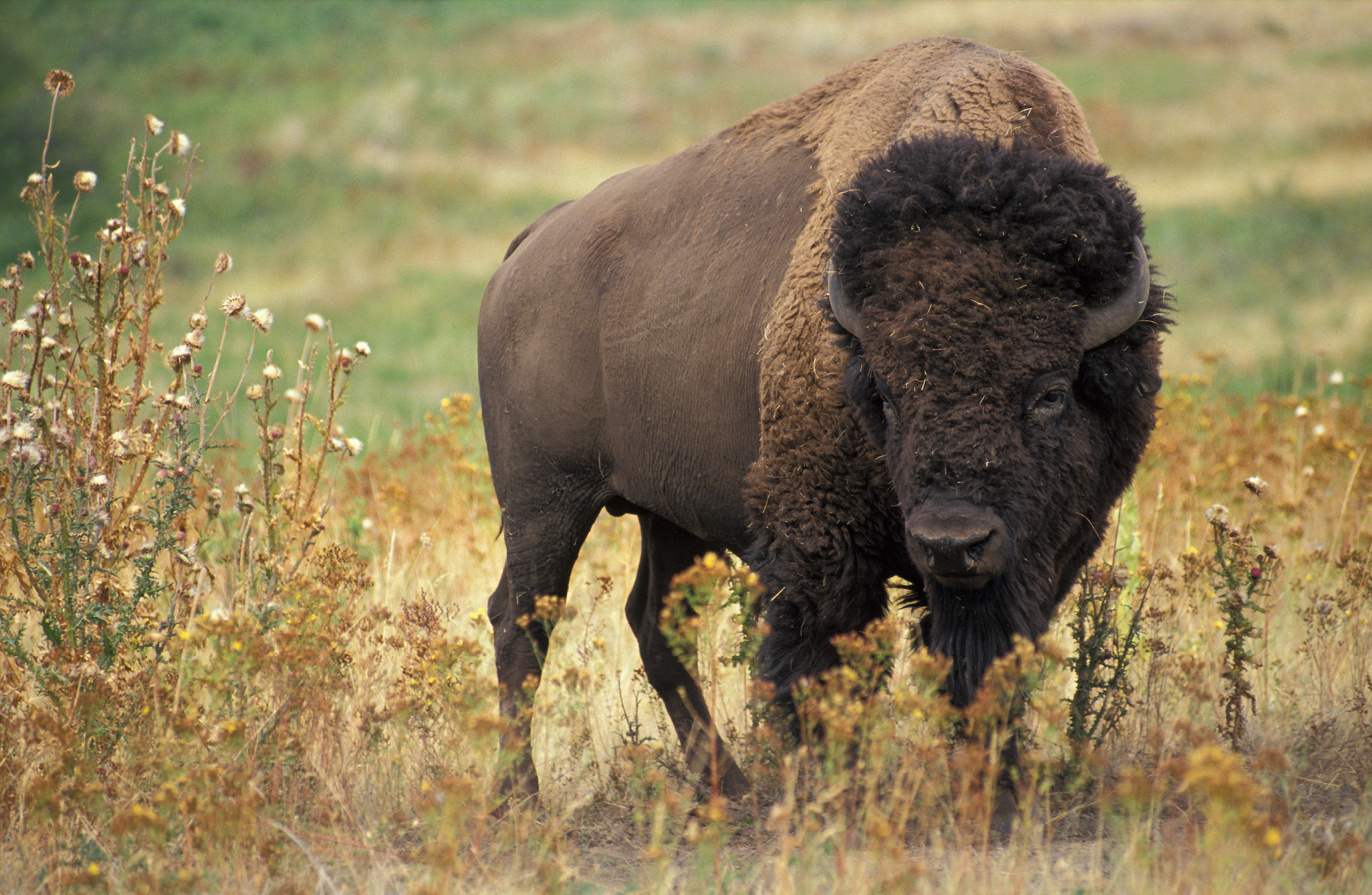
American bison

- Ancient bison, Bison antiquus (E)
- American bison, Bison bison NT (wood bison, B. b. athabascae: T)
- Bison occidentalis (E)
- Steppe wisent, Bison priscus (E)
- Harlan's muskox, Bootherium bombifrons (E)
- Shrub-ox, Euceratherium collinum (E)
- Muskox, Ovibos moschatus LC
- Mountain goat, Oreamnos americanus LC
- Harrington's mountain goat, Oreamnos harringtoni (E)
- Bighorn sheep, Ovis canadensis LC

(Desert bighorn sheep, O. c. nelsoni and Sierra Nevada bighorn sheep, O. c. sierrae: E)

- Dall sheep, Ovis dalli LC
- Giant muskox, Praeovibos priscus (E)
- Soergel's ox, Soergelia mayfieldi (E)

=== Cervidae (deer) ===
- Moose, Alces alces (Note: Moose, Alces americanus: North American Mammals NMNH SI, Mammal Species of the World (MSW3), - as North American A. americanus (distinct from Eurasian elk A. alces). Alces alces: IUCN Red List, Burt & Grossenheider 1976 (Peterson Field Guide), Kays & Wilson 2002.) LC
- Stag-moose, Cervalces scotti (E)
- Elk (wapiti), Cervus canadensis (Note: Elk, Cervus canadensis: Baker et al. 2003, Burt & Grossenheider 1976 (Peterson Field Guide), North American Mammals NMNH SI (species list from the database). Kays & Wilson 2002, North American Mammals NMNH SI (Field Guide), Mammal Species of the World (MSW3), IUCN Red List - as "worldwide" C. elaphus (not North American C. canadensis.)) LC
  - Eastern elk, C. c. canadensis (E) EX
  - Merriam's elk, C. c. merriami (E) EX
- Common red brocket, Mazama americana DD
- Amazonian brown brocket, Mazama nemorivaga LC
- Central American red brocket, Mazama temama DD
- Mule deer, Odocoileus hemionus LC
- American mountain deer, Odocoileus lucasi (E)
- Yucatan brown brocket, Odocoileus pandora VU
- White-tailed deer, Odocoileus virginianus LC

(Columbian white-tailed deer, O. v. leucurus and Key deer, O. v. clavium: E)

- Caribou, Rangifer tarandus (Note: Caribou, Rangifer tarandus: Baker et al. 2003, Kays & Wilson 2002, North American Mammals NMNH SI, Mammal Species of the World (MSW3), IUCN Red List. Burt & Grossenheider 1976 (Peterson Field Guide) - as 3 distinct species: woodland caribou, R. caribou, barren-ground caribou, R. arcticus and Greenland caribou R. tarandus.) VU

(Migratory woodland caribou, R. t. caribou: E)

- Toronto subway deer, Torontoceros hypogeos (E)

=== Antilocapridae ===
- Pronghorn, Antilocapra americana LC (A. a. peninsularis and sonoriensis EN)

(Baja California pronghorn, A. a. peninsularis: E, Sonoran pronghorn, A. a. sonoriensis: E)

- Pacific pronghorn, Antilocapra pacifica (E)
- Dwarf pronghorn, Capromeryx minor (E)
- Shuler's pronghorn, Tetrameryx shuleri (E)
- Conkling's pronghorn, Stockoceros conklingi (E)

=== Cetacea ===
==== Delphinidae (oceanic dolphins) ====
Killer whales, Orcinus orca near Unimak Island, eastern Aleutian Islands, Alaska

- White-beaked dolphin, Lagenorhynchus albirostris LC
- Atlantic white-sided dolphin, Leucopleurus acutus LC
- Rough-toothed dolphin, Steno bredanensis LC
- Striped dolphin, Stenella coeruleoalba LC
- Atlantic spotted dolphin, Stenella frontalis LC
- Spinner dolphin, Stenella longirostris LC
- Clymene dolphin, Stenella clymene LC
- Pantropical spotted dolphin, Stenella attenuata LC
- Short-beaked common dolphin, Delphinus delphis LC and:
  - Long-beaked common dolphin, Delphinus capensis DD
- Common bottlenose dolphin, Tursiops truncatus LC
- Fraser's dolphin, Lagenodelphis hosei LC
- Northern right whale dolphin, Lissodelphis borealis LC
- Pacific white-sided dolphin, Sagmatias obliquidens LC
- False killer whale, Pseudorca crassidens NT
- Vaquita, Phocoena sinus CR
- Guiana dolphin, Sotalia guianensis NT
- Killer whale, Orcinus orca DD E
- Risso's dolphin, Grampus griseus LC
- Long-finned pilot whale, Globicephala melas LC
- Short-finned pilot whale, Globicephala macrorhynchus LC
- Pygmy killer whale, Feresa attenuata LC
- Melon-headed whale, Peponocephala electra LC

==== Monodontidae ====
- Beluga, Delphinapterus leucas LC E (Cook Inlet subpopulation: CR)
- Narwhal, Monodon monoceros LC

==== Phocoenidae (porpoises) ====
- Harbor porpoise, Phocoena phocoena LC
- Dall's porpoise, Phocoenoides dalli LC

==== Kogiidae ====
- Pygmy sperm whale, Kogia breviceps LC
- Dwarf sperm whale, Kogia sima (Hawaiian Islands only) LC

==== Physeteridae ====
- Sperm whale, Physeter macrocephalus VU E

==== Ziphiidae (beaked whales) ====
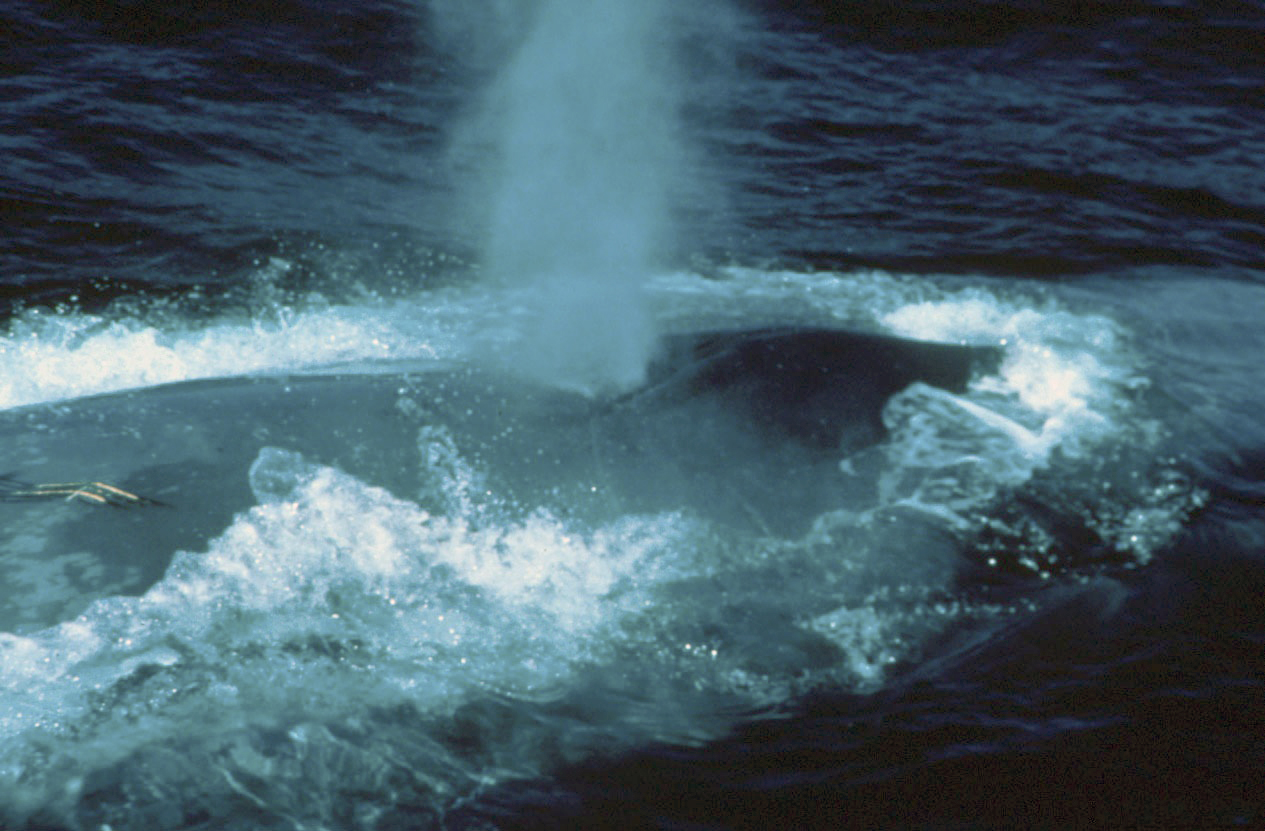
Blue whale, Balaenoptera musculus

- Giant beaked whale, Berardius bairdii LC (collective name for two species - Baird's beaked whale and Arnoux's beaked whale)
- Least beaked whale, Berardius minimus NT
- Gervais' beaked whale, Mesoplodon europaeus LC
- Blainville's beaked whale, Mesoplodon densirostris LC
- True's beaked whale, Mesoplodon mirus LC
- Sowerby's beaked whale, Mesoplodon bidens LC
- Stejneger's beaked whale, Mesoplodon stejnegeri NT
- Ginkgo-toothed beaked whale, Mesoplodon ginkgodens DD
- Hubbs' beaked whale, Mesoplodon carlhubbsi DD
- Perrin's beaked whale, Mesoplodon perrini EN
- Hector's beaked whale, Mesoplodon hectori (Note: Kays & Wilson 2002, IUCN Red List.) (A) DD
- Pygmy beaked whale, Mesoplodon peruvianus (Note: Pygmy beaked whale: Kays & Wilson 2002: one record in North America, Division of Mammals Collections NMNH SI: two strandings in California (2001 and 2012).) (A) LC
- Tropical bottlenose whale, Indopacetus pacificus LC
- Northern bottlenose whale, Hyperoodon ampullatus NT
- Cuvier's beaked whale, Ziphius cavirostris LC

==== Eschrichtiidae (gray whales) ====
- Gray whale, Eschrichtius robustus EN E

==== Balaenopteridae (rorquals) ====
- Blue whale, Balaenoptera musculus EN E

(ssp. brevicauda - pygmy blue whale: DD, ssp. musculus North Pacific stock: LR/cd, ssp. musculus North Atlantic stock: VU)

- Fin whale, Balaenoptera physalus EN E
- Sei whale, Balaenoptera borealis EN E
- Common minke whale, Balaenoptera acutorostrata LC
- Bryde's whale (Balaenoptera edeni) (A) LC or:

- Bryde's whale, Balaenoptera brydei
- Rice's whale, Balaenoptera ricei CR

- Humpback whale, Megaptera novaeangliae LC E

==== Balaenidae ====
- Bowhead whale, Balaena mysticetus LC E (Bering-Chukchi-Beaufort Sea subpopulation: LR/cd, Svalbard-Barents Sea (Spitsbergen) subpopulation: EN)
- North Atlantic right whale, Eubalaena glacialis CR E
- North Pacific right whale, Eubalaena japonica (A) (Alaska) EN E (Northeast Pacific subpopulation: CR)

== Sirenia (sea cows) ==
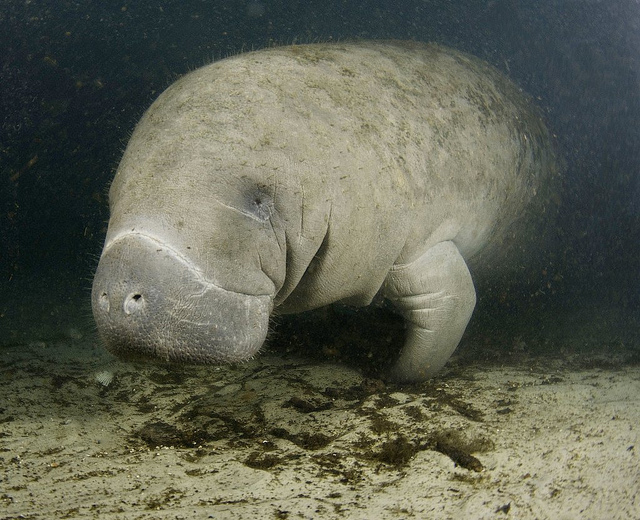
Manatee, Trichechus manatus Crystal River, Florida

=== Trichechidae ===
- West Indian manatee, Trichechus manatus VU E

(ssp. T. m. manatus - Antillean or Caribbean manatee: EN, ssp. T. m. latirostris - Florida manatee: EN)

=== Dugongidae ===
- Steller's sea cow, Hydrodamalis gigas (E) EX

== Proboscidea ==
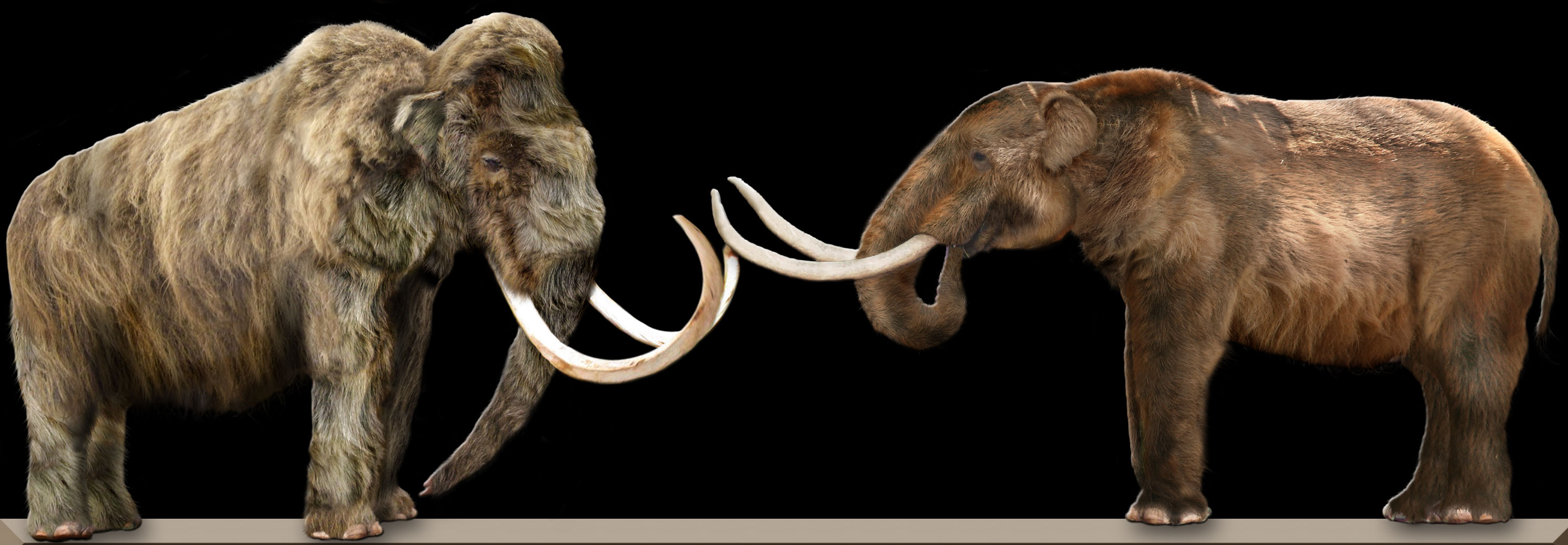
Physical reconstruction of a mammoth and a mastodon

=== Elephantidae ===
- Columbian mammoth, Mammuthus columbi (E)
- Pygmy mammoth, Mammuthus exilis (E)
- Woolly mammoth, Mammuthus primigenius (E)

=== Mammutidae ===
- American mastodon, Mammut americanum (E)
- Pacific mastodon, Mammut pacificus (E)

=== Gomphothere ===
- Cuvieronius hyodon (E)
- Stegomastodon sp. (E)

== Introduced mammals ==
=== Echimyidae - Echimyinae, Myocastorini ===
- Nutria, Myocastor coypus (Note: Baker et al. 2003, Burt & Grossenheider 1976 (Peterson Field Guide), Kays & Wilson 2002, IUCN Red List.) (I) LC

=== Muridae ===
- House mouse, Mus musculus (Note: House mouse: Baker et al. 2003, Burt & Grossenheider 1976 (Peterson Field Guide), Kays & Wilson 2002, IUCN Red List. Mammal Species of the World (MSW3) - only general range description.) (I) LC
- Norway rat, Rattus norvegicus (Note: Baker et al. 2003, Burt & Grossenheider 1976 (Peterson Field Guide), Kays & Wilson 2002.) (I) LC
- Black rat, Rattus rattus (I) LC

=== Leporidae (rabbits and hares) ===
- European hare, Lepus europaeus (Note: Baker et al. 2003, Burt & Grossenheider 1976 (Peterson Field Guide), Mammal Species of the World (MSW3), IUCN Red List.) (I) LC
- Cape hare, Lepus capensis (I) LC
- European rabbit, Oryctolagus cuniculus (Note: European rabbit: Baker et al. 2003. Kays & Wilson 2002 - range not clear (islands on Pacific Coast). Introduced to Hawaii.) EN (I)

=== Cercopithecidae (Old World monkeys) ===
- Mona monkey, Cercopithecus mona (I) NT
- Vervet monkey, Chlorocebus pygerythrus (I) LC
- Green monkey, Chlorocebus sabaeus (I) LC
- Japanese macaque, Macaca fuscata (I) LC
- Rhesus macaque, Macaca mulatta (I) LC

=== Herpestidae (mongoose) ===
- Small Indian mongoose, Urva auropunctata (I) (Caribbean) LC

=== Mustelidae ===
- Beech marten, Martes foina (I) LC

=== Suidae (pigs) ===
- Wild boar, Sus scrofa (Note: Sus scrofa: Baker et al. 2003 - feral pig or wild boar, Burt & Grossenheider 1976 (Peterson Field Guide) - wild boar (Swine), Kays & Wilson 2002 - wild boar, Mammal Species of the World (MSW3) - wild boar - feral populations, IUCN Red List - wild boar - introduced.) (I) LC

=== Bovidae (bovids) ===
- Barbary sheep, Ammotragus lervia (Note: Baker et al. 2003, Kays & Wilson 2002, Mammal Species of the World (MSW3), IUCN Red List.) (Note: Barbary sheep - free ranging.) (I) VU
- Blackbuck, Antilope cervicapra (Note: Blackbuck - free ranging.) (I) LC
- Nilgai, Boselaphus tragocamelus (Note: Nilgai - semi-free-ranging/free-ranging.) (I) LC
- Bezoar ibex, Capra aegagrus aegagrus (Note: Bezoar ibex - free-ranging: Florida Mountains near Deming New Mexico.) (I) LC
- Siberian ibex, Capra sibirica (I) NT
- Gemsbok, Oryx gazella (Note: Gemsbok - free ranging.) (I) LC

=== Cervidae (deer) ===
- Chital, Axis axis (Note: Chital - free-ranging.) (I) LC
- Indian hog deer, Axis porcinus (I) EN
- Sika deer, Cervus nippon (I) LC
- Red deer, Cervus elaphus (Note: Red deer, elaphus division (not canadensis division) - introduced) (I) LC
- European fallow deer, Dama dama (I) LC
- Sambar, Rusa unicolor (Note: Sambar - free ranging.) (I) VU

== See also ==
- List of birds of North America
- List of mammals of Mexico
- Mammals of the Caribbean
- List of mammals of Greenland
- List of mammals of Central America
- List of mammals of South America
- Great American Interchange
- List of mammal genera
- Lists of mammals by region
- List of reptiles of North America
- List of amphibians of North America
- List of U.S. state mammals
- List of U.S. state birds
- List of U.S. state reptiles
- List of U.S. state amphibians

== Notes ==
- Species listed in Baker et al. 2003, but omitted in this article: European ferret, Mustela putorius, Himalayan tahr, Hemitragus jemlahicus.
