= American mammal =

American mammal may refer to:

- Mammals of North America
- Mammals of Central America
- Mammals of South America
