= Geomys lutescens =

Sand Hills pocket gopher

Scientific classification
- Domain: Eukaryota
- Kingdom: Animalia
- Phylum: Chordata
- Class: Mammalia
- Order: Rodentia
- Family: Geomyidae
- Genus: Geomys
- Species: G. lutescens

Binomial name
- Geomys lutescens Merriam, 1890

Synonyms
- Geomys bursarius lutescens Merriam, 1890

Species of rodent

Geomys lutescens, also known as the Sand Hills pocket gopher, is a species of pocket gopher native to the western United States (Wyoming, Colorado, South Dakota, and Nebraska). It is a fossorial rodent that inhabits the Mississippi basin. The common name is derived from the type locality of Sand Hills.

== Taxonomy ==
Authors have debated for decades whether this is a distinct species or a subspecies of the plains pocket gopher. Recent genetic evidence and the lack of gene flow from other gopher populations has supported this being a distinct species and a sister species to Hall's pocket gopher.

The subspecies G. l. jugossicularis was recently split from the Sand Hills pocket gopher as its own distinct species. The other subspecies, G. l. halli, was later found to be a subspecies of Hall's pocket gopher, leaving this species with no subspecies.
