= Geomys jugossicularis =

Scientific classification
- Domain: Eukaryota
- Kingdom: Animalia
- Phylum: Chordata
- Class: Mammalia
- Order: Rodentia
- Family: Geomyidae
- Genus: Geomys
- Species: G. jugossicularis

Binomial name
- Geomys jugossicularis Hooper, 1940

Subspecies
- G. j. jugossicularis Hooper, 1940; G. j. halli Sudman et al., 1987

Synonyms
- Geomys lutescens jugossicularis Hooper, 1940; Geomys bursarius jugossicularis Hooper, 1940

Species of rodent

Geomys jugossicularis, also known as Hall's pocket gopher and Colorado pocket gopher, is a species of pocket gopher native to the western United States (Colorado, Kansas, and Nebraska). Little is known of its behavior or ecology aside from typical behaviors of the other pocket gophers.

== Taxonomy ==
This species was originally considered a subspecies of the Sand Hills pocket gopher and then later a subspecies of the plains pocket gopher. Chromosomal and genetic evidence have supported that there is no gene flow between this species and either G. lutescens or G. bursarius, suggesting that this is a distinct species. It forms a clade that is genetically distinct from all other members of this genus. This species is a sister species to Geomys lutescens.

There are two subspecies: G. j. jugossicularis and G. j. halli. G. j. halli was formerly considered a subspecies of Geomys lutescens, but was found to be genetically distinct from that species. G. j. jugossicularis is found in northeastern Colorado, while G. j. halli is found in western Nebraska. The exact border between the two subspecies is not known. They differ in their karyotype numbers and in G. j. halli being smaller.g

G. j. halli is named after Eugene Raymond Hall.
