= List of mammals of Arizona =

This is a list of mammals of Arizona. It includes species native to the U.S. state of Arizona and mammals accidentally introduced into the state. However, it does not include domesticated animals that become feral and cause major disruptions to various ecosystems.

== Opossums ==
Family: Didelphidae

- Virginia opossum, Didelphis virginiana

== Shrews ==
Family: Soricidae

- North American least shrew, Cryptotis parva
- Crawford's gray shrew, Notiosorex crawfordi
- Arizona shrew, Sorex arizonae
- Cinereus shrew, Sorex cinereus
- Merriam's shrew, Sorex merriami
- Montane shrew, Sorex monticolus
- American water shrew, Sorex palustris

== Bats ==
Family: Molossidae

- Western mastiff bat, Eumops perotis
- Pocketed free-tailed bat, Nyctinomops femorosaccus
- Big free-tailed bat, Nyctinomops macrotis
- Mexican free-tailed bat, Tadarida brasiliensis

Family: Phyllostomidae

- Mexican long-tongued bat, Choeronycteris mexicana
- Greater long-nosed bat, Leptonycteris nivalis
- Lesser long-nosed bat, Leptonycteris yerbabuenae
- California leaf-nosed bat, Macrotus californicus

Family: Vespertilionidae

- Hoary bat, Aeorestes cinereus
- Pallid bat, Antrozous pallidus
- Townsend's big-eared bat, Corynorhinus townsendii
- Big brown bat, Eptesicus fuscus
- Spotted bat, Euderma maculatum
- Allen's big-eared bat, Idionycteris phyllotis
- Silver-haired bat, Lasionycteris noctivagans
- Western red bat, Lasiurus blossevillii
- Western yellow bat, Lasiurus xanthinus
- Southwestern myotis, Myotis auriculus
- California myotis, Myotis californicus
- Western small-footed myotis, Myotis ciliolabrum
- Long-eared myotis, Myotis evotis
- Little brown bat, Myotis lucifugus
- Arizona myotis, Myotis occultus
- Fringed myotis, Myotis thysanodes
- Yuma myotis, Myotis yumanensis
- Western pipistrelle, Pipistrellus hersperus

== Lagomorphs ==
Family: Leporidae

- Antelope jackrabbit, Lepus alleni
- Black-tailed jackrabbit, Lepus californicus
- White-sided jackrabbit, Lepus callotis presence uncertain
- Desert cottontail, Sylvilagus audubonii
- Eastern cottontail, Sylvilagus floridanus
- Robust cottontail, Sylvilagus holzneri
  - S. h. hesperius
- Mountain cottontail, Sylvilagus nuttallii

== Rodents ==
Family: Castoridae

- American beaver, Castor canadensis

Family: Geomyidae

- Yellow-faced pocket gopher, Cratogeomys castanops
- Desert pocket gopher, Geomys arenarius
- Plains pocket gopher, Geomys bursarius
- Botta's pocket gopher, Thomomys bottae
- Northern pocket gopher, Thomomys talpoides
- Southern pocket gopher, Thomomys umbrinus

Family: Heteromyidae

- Bailey's pocket mouse, Chaetodipus balieyi
- Long-tailed pocket mouse, Chaetodipus formosus
- Hispid pocket mouse, Chaetodipus hispidus
- Rock pocket mouse, Chaetodipus intermedius
- Desert pocket mouse, Chaetodipus penicillatus
- Spiny pocket mouse, Chaetodipus spinatus
- Merriam's kangaroo rat, Dipodomys merriamii
- Ord's kangaroo rat, Dipodomys ordii
- Banner-tailed kangaroo rat, Dipodomys spectabilis
- Arizona pocket mouse, Perognathus amplus
- Silky pocket mouse, Perognathus flavus
- Little pocket mouse, Perognathus longimembris
- Merriam's pocket mouse, Perognathus merriami
- Great Basin pocket mouse, Perognathus parvus

Family: Cricetidae

- Northern pygmy mouse, Baiomys taylori
- Long-tailed vole, Microtus longicadus
- Mogollon vole, Microtus mogollonenis
- Montane vole, Microtus montanus
- Southern red-backed vole, Myodes gapperi
- White-throated woodrat, Neotoma albigula
- Bushy-tailed woodrat, Neotoma cinerea
- Arizona woodrat, Neotoma devia
- Desert woodrat, Neotoma lepida
- White-toothed woodrat, Neotoma leucodon
- Mexican woodrat, Neotoma mexicana
- Stephen's woodrat, Neotoma stephensi
- Common muskrat, Ondatra zibethicus
- Northern grasshopper mouse, Onychomys leucogaster
- Southern grasshopper mouse, Onychomys torridus
- Brush deermouse, Peromyscus boylii
- Canyon deermouse, Peromyscus crinitus
- Cactus deermouse, Peromyscus eremicus
- Gambel's deermouse, Peromyscus gambelii
- Southern deermouse, Peromyscus labecula
- White-footed mouse, Peromyscus leucopus
- Black-eared mouse, Peromyscus melanotis
- Northern rock mouse, Peromyscus nasutus
- Western deer mouse, Peromyscus sonoriensis
- Pinyon mouse, Peromyscus truei
- Fulvous harvest mouse, Reithrodontomys fulvescens
- Western harvest mouse, Reithrodontomys megalotis
- Arizona cotton rat, Sigmodon arizonae
- Tawny-bellied cotton rat, Sigmodon fulviventer
- Hispid cotton rat, Sigmodon hispidus
- Yellow-nosed cotton rat, Sigmodon ochrognathus

Family: Muridae

- House mouse, Mus musculus introduced
- Norway rat, Rattus norvegicus introduced
- Black rat, Rattus rattus introduced

Family: Dipodidae

- Western jumping mouse, Zapus princeps

Family: Erethizontidae

- North American porcupine, Erethizon dorsatum

Family: Echimyidae

- Coypu, Myocastor coypus introduced

Family: Sciuridae

- Harris's antelope squirrel, Ammospermophilus harrisii
- White-tailed antelope squirrel, Ammospermophilus leucurus
- Gunnison's prairie dog, Cynomys gunnisoni
- Black-tailed prairie dog, Cynomys ludovicianus
- Yellow-bellied marmot, Marmota flaviventris
- Gray-footed chipmunk, Neotamias canipes
- Gray-collared chipmunk, Neotamias cinereicollis
- Cliff chipmunk, Neotamias dorsalis
- Least chipmunk, Neotamias minimus
- Colorado chipmunk, Neotamias quadrivittatus
- Hopi chipmunk, Neotamias rufus
- Uinta chipmunk, Neotamias umbrinus
- Rock squirrel, Otospermophilus variegatus
- Abert's squirrel, Sciurus aberti
- Arizona gray squirrel, Sciurus arizonensis
- Mexican fox squirrel, Sciurus nayaritensis
- Fox squirrel, Sciurus niger
- Golden-mantled ground squirrel, Spermophilus lateralis
- Mexican ground squirrel, Spermophilus mexicanus
- Thirteen-lined ground squirrel, Spermophilus tridecimlineatus
- Southwestern red squirrel, Tamiasciurus fremonti
  - Mount Graham red squirrel, T. f. grahamensis
- Spotted ground squirrel, Xerospermophilus spilosoma
- Round-tailed ground squirrel, Xerospermophilus tereticaudus

== Carnivorans ==
Family: Canidae

- Coyote, Canis latrans
- Gray wolf, Canis lupus reintroduced
  - Mexican wolf, C. l. baileyi reintroduced
  - †Mogollon mountain wolf, C. l. mogollonensis extinct
  - †Southern Rocky Mountain wolf, C. l. youngi extinct
- Gray fox, Urocyon cinereoargenteus
- Kit fox, Vulpes macrotis
- Red fox, Vulpes vulpes

Family: Ursidae

- American black bear, Ursus americanus
- Brown bear, Ursus arctos extirpated
  - Grizzly bear, U. a. horribilis extirpated
  - †Mexican grizzly bear, U. a. horribilis extinct

Family: Procyonidae

- Ring-tailed cat, Bassariscus astutus
- White-nosed coati, Nasua narica
- Raccoon, Procyon lotor

Family: Mephitidae

- American hog-nosed skunk, Conepatus leuconotus
- Hooded skunk, Mephitis macroura
- Striped skunk, Mephitis mephitis
- Western spotted skunk, Spilogale gracilis

Family: Felidae

- Ocelot, Leopardus pardalis
- Bobcat, Lynx rufus
- Jaguar, Panthera onca vagrant
- Cougar, Puma concolor

Family: Mustelidae

- North American river otter, Lontra canadensis
- Black-footed ferret, Mustela nigripes reintroduced
- Long-tailed weasel, Neogale frenata
- American badger, Taxidea taxus

== Even-toed ungulates ==
Family: Antilocapridae

- Pronghorn, Antilocapra americana
  - Rocky Mountain pronghorn, A. a. americana
  - Mexican pronghorn, A. a. mexicana
  - Sonoran pronghorn, A. a. sonoriensis

Family: Bovidae

- American bison, Bison bison reintroduced
  - Plains bison, B. b. bison reintroduced
- Bighorn sheep, Ovis canadensis
  - Desert bighorn sheep, O. c. nelsoni

Family: Cervidae

- Elk, Cervus canadensis reintroduced
  - †Merriam's elk, C. c. merriami extinct
  - Rocky Mountain elk, C. c. nelsoni introduced
- Mule deer, Odocoileus hemionus
  - Desert mule deer, O. h. eremicus
- White-tailed deer, Odocoileus virginianius
  - Coues' deer, O. v. couesi

Family: Tayassuidae

- Collared peccary, Dicotyles tajacu
