= List of mammals of Nebraska =

This is a full list of the mammals indigenous to the U.S. state of Nebraska. It consists of 89 mammals either live or have lived in the state. As a state located in the northern Great Plains, Nebraska has a diverse mammalian fauna, due to the intersection of major climatic and environmental zones within its boundaries.

The following tags are used to highlight each species' conservation status as assessed by the International Union for Conservation of Nature:

EX	Extinct	No reasonable doubt that the last individual has died.
EW	Extinct in the wild	Known only to survive in captivity or as a naturalized populations well outside its previous range.
CR	Critically endangered	The species is in imminent risk of extinction in the wild.
EN	Endangered	The species is facing an extremely high risk of extinction in the wild.
VU	Vulnerable	The species is facing a high risk of extinction in the wild.
NT	Near threatened	The species does not meet any of the criteria that would categorize it as risking extinction but it is likely to do so in the future.
LC	Least concern	There are no current identifiable risks to the species.
DD	Data deficient	There is inadequate information to make an assessment of the risks to this species.

== Opossums ==
- Family Didelphidae (opossums)
  - Subfamily: Didelphinae
    - Genus: Didelphis
      - Virginia opossum, D. virginiana LC

== Armadillos ==
- Family Dasypodidae (armadillos)
  - Genus: Dasypus
    - Nine-banded armadillo, D. novemcinctus LC

== Insectivores ==
Eulipotyphlans are insectivorous mammals. Shrews closely resemble mice, while moles are stout-bodied burrowers.

- Family Soricidae (shrews)
  - Genus: Blarina
    - Northern short-tailed shrew B. brevicauda LC
    - Elliot's short-tailed shrew B. hylophaga LC
  - Genus: Cryptotis
    - North American least shrew C. parva LC
  - Genus: Sorex
    - Masked shrew S. cinereus LC
- Family Talpidae (moles)
  - Genus: Scalopus
    - Eastern mole, S. aquaticus LC

== Lagomorphs ==
- Family Lagomorpha (rabbits, hares and pikas)
  - Genus: Lepus
    - Black-tailed jackrabbit, L. californicus LC
    - White-tailed jackrabbit, L. townsendii LC
  - Genus: Sylvilagus
    - Desert cottontail, S. audubonii LC
    - Eastern cottontail, S. floridanus LC
    - Mountain cottontail, S. nuttallii LC

== Rodents ==
- Family Castoridae (beavers)
  - Genus: Castor
    - North American beaver, C. canadensis LC
- Family Cricetidae (New World mice, rats, voles, lemmings, muskrats)
  - Genus: Microtus
    - Prairie vole, M. ochrogaster LC
    - Meadow vole, M. pennsylvanicus LC
    - Woodland vole, M. pinetorum LC
  - Genus: Clethrionomys
    - Southern red-backed vole, C. gapperi LC
  - Genus: Neotoma
    - Bushy-tailed woodrat, N. cinerea LC
    - Eastern woodrat, N. floridana LC
  - Genus: Onychomys
    - Northern grasshopper mouse, O. leucogaster LC
  - Genus: Peromyscus
    - White-footed mouse, P. leucopus LC
    - North American deermouse, P. maniculatus LC
  - Genus: Ondatra
    - Muskrat, O. zibethicus LC
  - Genus: Peromyscus
    - White-footed mouse, P. leucopus LC
    - Western deer mouse, P. sonoriensis NE
  - Genus: Reithrodontomys
    - Western harvest mouse, R. megalotis LC
    - Plains harvest mouse, R. montanus LC
  - Genus: Sigmodon
    - Hispid cotton rat, S. hispidus LC
  - Genus: Synaptomys
    - Southern bog lemming, S. cooperi LC
- Family Dipodidae (jumping mice)
  - Genus: Zapus
    - Meadow jumping mouse, Z. hudsonius LC
- Family Erethizontidae (New World porcupines)
  - Genus: Erethizon
    - North American porcupine, E. dorsatum LC
- Family Muridae (Old World mice and rats)
  - Genus: Mus
    - House mouse, M. musculus LC introduced
  - Genus: Rattus
    - Brown rat, R. norvegicus LC introduced
    - Black rat, R. rattus LC introduced
- Family Sciuridae (squirrels)
  - Genus: Glaucomys
    - Southern flying squirrel, G. volans LC
  - Genus: Marmota
    - Groundhog, M. monax LC
  - Genus: Sciurus
    - Eastern gray squirrel, S. carolinensis LC
    - Fox squirrel, S. niger LC
  - Genus: Urocitellus
    - Wyoming ground squirrel, U. elegans LC
  - Genus: Poliocitellus
    - Franklin's ground squirrel, P. franklinii LC
  - Genus: Xerospermophilus
    - Spotted ground squirrel, X. spilosoma
  - Genus: Neotamias
    - Least chipmunk, N. minimus LC
  - Genus: Ictidomys
    - Thirteen-lined ground squirrel, I. tridecemlineatus LC
  - Genus: Tamias
    - Eastern chipmunk, T. striatus LC
  - Genus: Cynomys
    - Black-tailed prairie dog, C. ludovicianus LC
- Family Heteromyidae (pocket mice and kangaroo rats)
  - Genus: Perognathus
    - Olive-backed pocket mouse, P. fasciatus LC
    - Plains pocket mouse, P. flavescens LC
    - Silky pocket mouse, P. flavus LC
  - Genus: Chaetodipus
    - Hispid pocket mouse, C. hispidus LC
  - Genus: Dipodomys
    - Ord's kangaroo rat, D. ordii LC
- Family Geomyidae (pocket gophers)
  - Genus: Geomys
    - Plains pocket gopher, G. bursarius LC
  - Genus: Thomomys
    - Northern pocket gopher, T. talpoides DD

== Bats ==
- Family Vespertilionidae (vesper bats)
  - Genus: Aeorestes
    - Hoary bat, A. cinereus LC
  - Genus: Corynorhinus
    - Townsend's big-eared bat, C. townsendii LC
  - Genus: Eptesicus
    - Big brown bat, E. fuscus LC
  - Genus: Lasionycteris
    - Silver-haired bat, L. noctivagans LC
  - Genus: Lasiurus
    - Eastern red bat, L. borealis LC
  - Genus: Myotis
    - Western small-footed myotis, M. ciliolabrum LC
    - Little brown bat, M. lucifugus EN
    - Northern long-eared bat, M. septentrionalis NT
    - Fringed myotis, M. thysanodes LC
    - Long-legged myotis, M. volans LC
  - Genus: Nycticeius
    - Evening bat, N. humeralis LC
  - Genus: Perimyotis
    - Tricolored bat, P. subflavus VU
- Family Free-tailed bat (free-tailed bats)
  - Genus: Tadarida
    - Mexican free-tailed bat, T. brasiliensis LC

== Carnivores ==
- Family Canidae (canids)
  - Genus: Canis
    - Coyote, C. latrans LC
    - Gray wolf, C. lupus LC extirpated
      - Great Plains wolf, C. l. nubilus extirpated
  - Genus: Vulpes
    - Swift fox, V. velox LC
    - Red fox, V. vulpes LC
- Family Procyonidae (raccoons)
  - Genus: Procyon
    - Common raccoon, P. lotor LC
- Family Ursidae (bears)
  - Genus: Ursus
    - American black bear, U. americanus LC
    - Brown bear, U. arctos LC extirpated
      - Grizzly bear, U. a. horribilis extirpated
- Family Felidae (cats)
  - Genus: Lynx
    - Canada lynx, L. canadensis LC extirpated, vagrant
    - Bobcat, L. rufus LC
  - Genus: Puma
    - Cougar, P. concolor LC
- Family Mustelidae (weasels, minks, martens, fishers, and otters)
  - Genus: Lontra
    - North American river otter, L. canadensis LC reintroduced
  - Genus: Mustela
    - Black-footed ferret, M. nigripes EN extirpated
    - Least weasel, M. nivalis LC
  - Genus: Neogale
    - Long-tailed weasel, N. frenata LC
    - American mink, N. vison LC
  - Genus: Taxidea
    - American badger, T. taxus LC
- Family Mephitidae (skunks)
  - Genus: Mephitis
    - Striped skunk, M. mephitis LC
  - Genus: Spilogale
    - Western spotted skunk, S. gracilis LC
    - Eastern spotted skunk, S. putorius LC

== Even-toed ungulates ==
- Family Antilocapridae (pronghorns)
  - Genus: Antilocapra
    - Pronghorn, A. americana LC
- Family Bovidae (bovids)
  - Genus: Bison
    - American bison, B. bison NT reintroduced
  - Genus: Ovis
    - Bighorn sheep, O. canadensis LC reintroduced
- Family Cervidae (deer)
  - Genus: Alces
    - Moose, A. alces LC vagrant
  - Genus: Cervus
    - Elk, C. canadensis LC reintroduced
    - Sika deer, C. nippon LC introduced
  - Genus: Odocoileus
    - Mule deer, O. hemionus LC
    - White-tailed deer, O. virginianus LC
