= List of mammals of South Dakota =

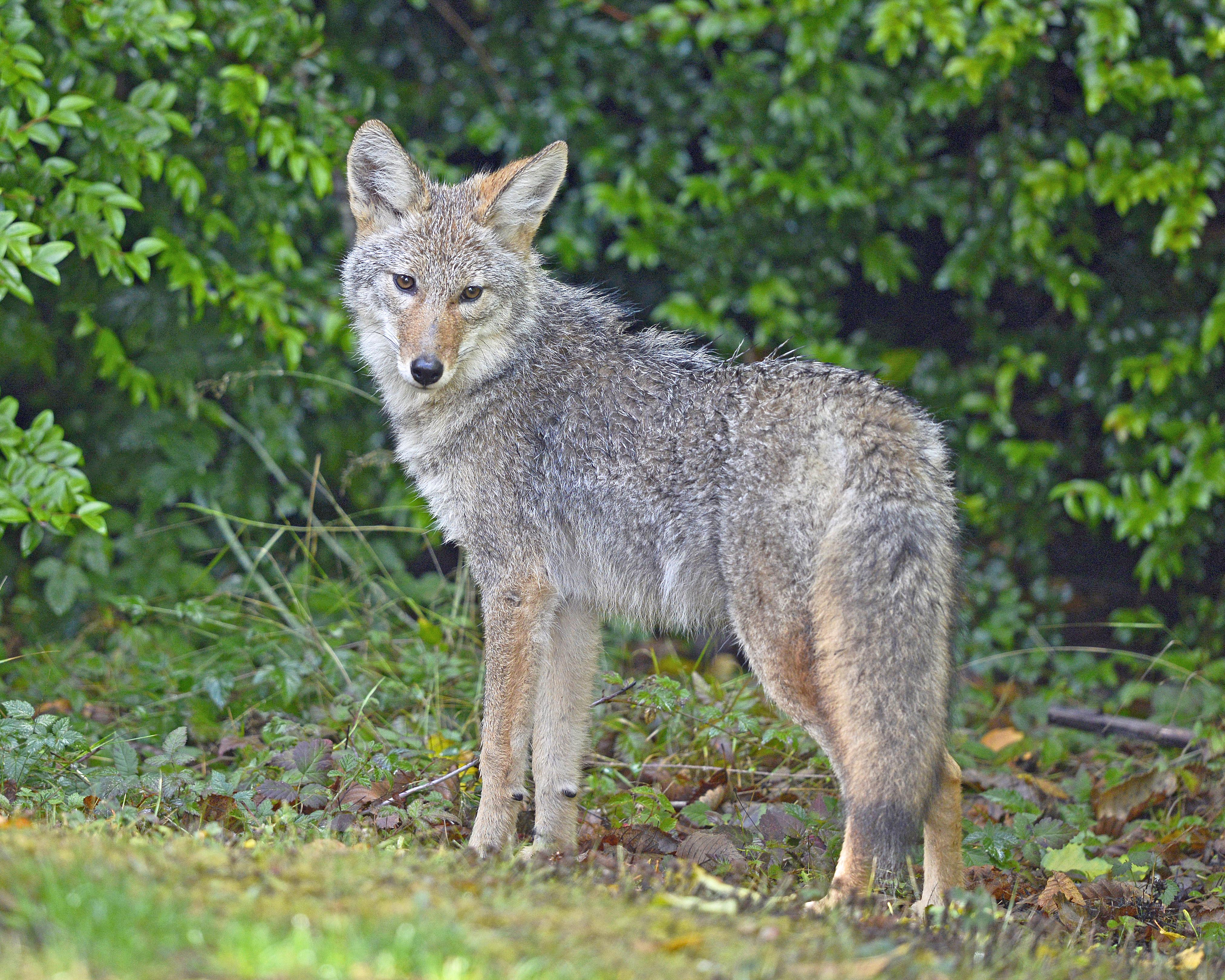
The coyote is the state animal of South Dakota

This list of mammals of South Dakota includes species native to the U.S. state of South Dakota. Three species that are extirpated from the state are the mountain goat, gray wolf, and grizzly bear. The state consists of 86 species that live and formerly inhabited South Dakota.

== Order Didelphimorphia ==
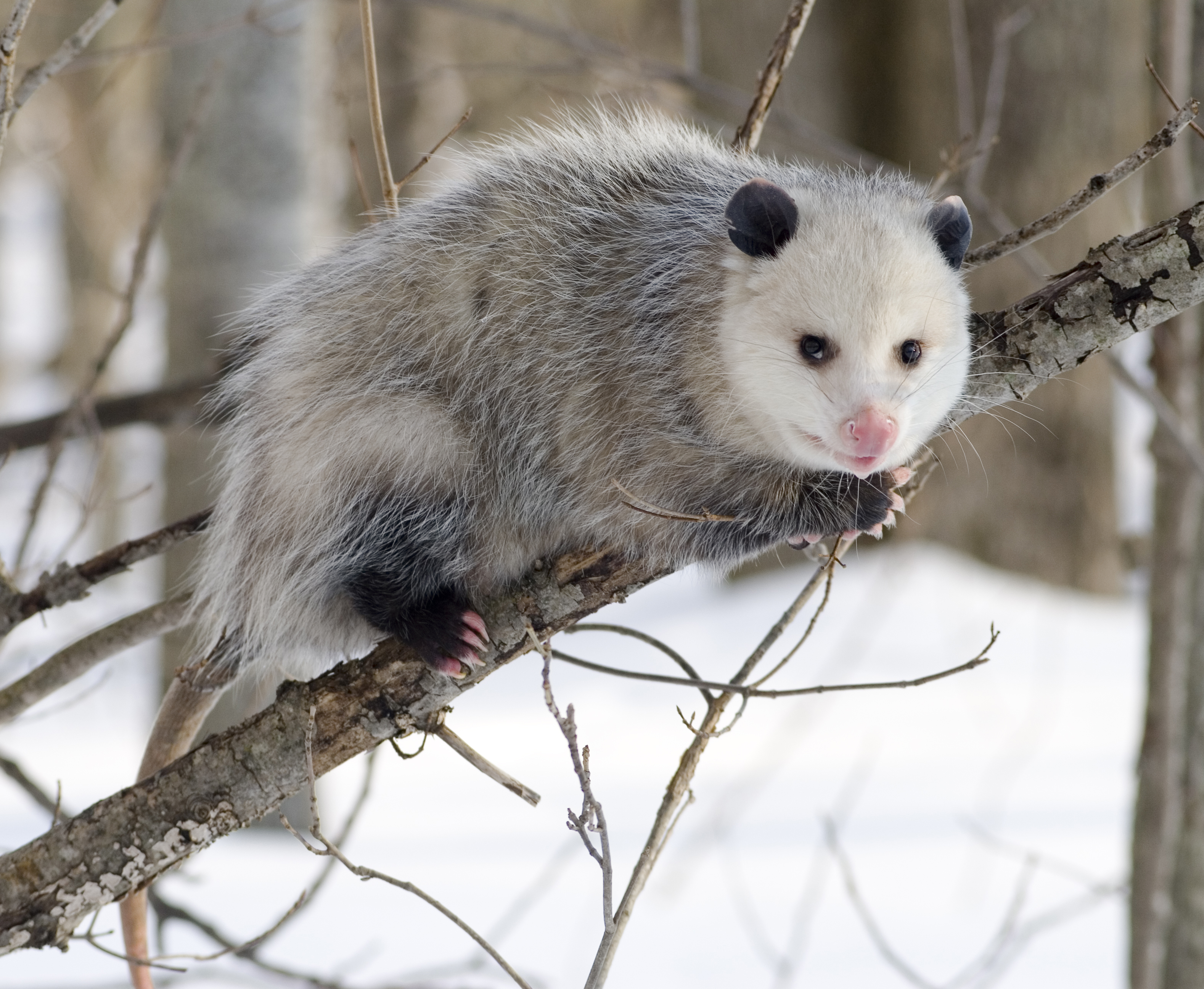
Virginia opossum

=== Didelphidae ===
- Virginia opossum, Didelphis virginiana

== Order Eulipotyphla ==
=== Soricidae (shrews) ===
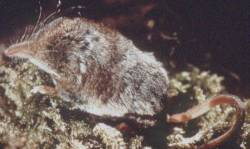
Masked shrew

- Northern short-tailed shrew, Blarina brevicauda
- Least shrew, Cryptotis parva
- Arctic shrew, Sorex arcticus
- Masked shrew, Sorex cinereus
- American pygmy shrew, Sorex hoyi possibly extirpated
- Dwarf shrew, Sorex nanus
- American water shrew, Sorex palustris

=== Talpidae (moles) ===
- Eastern mole, Scalopus aquaticus

== Order Chiroptera ==
=== Vespertilionidae ===
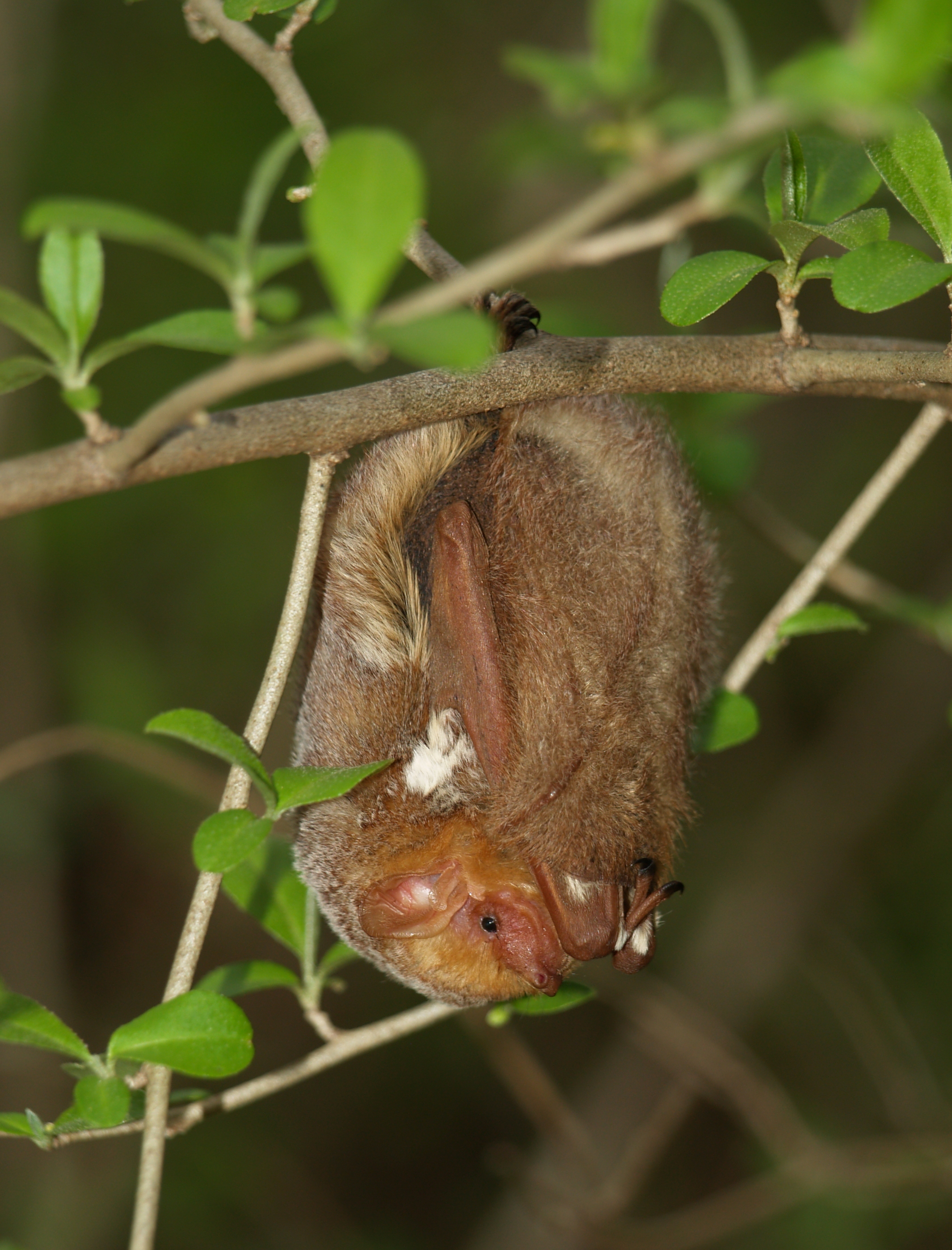
Eastern red bat

- Big brown bat, Eptesicus fuscus
- Eastern red bat, Lasiurus borealis
- Hoary bat, Lasiurus cinereus
- Silver-haired bat, Lasionycteris noctivagans
- Keen's myotis, Myotis keenii
- Fringe-tailed bat, Myotis thysanodes
- Little brown bat, Myotis lucifugus
- Townsend's big-eared bat, Plecotus townsendii

== Order Carnivora ==
=== Canidae ===
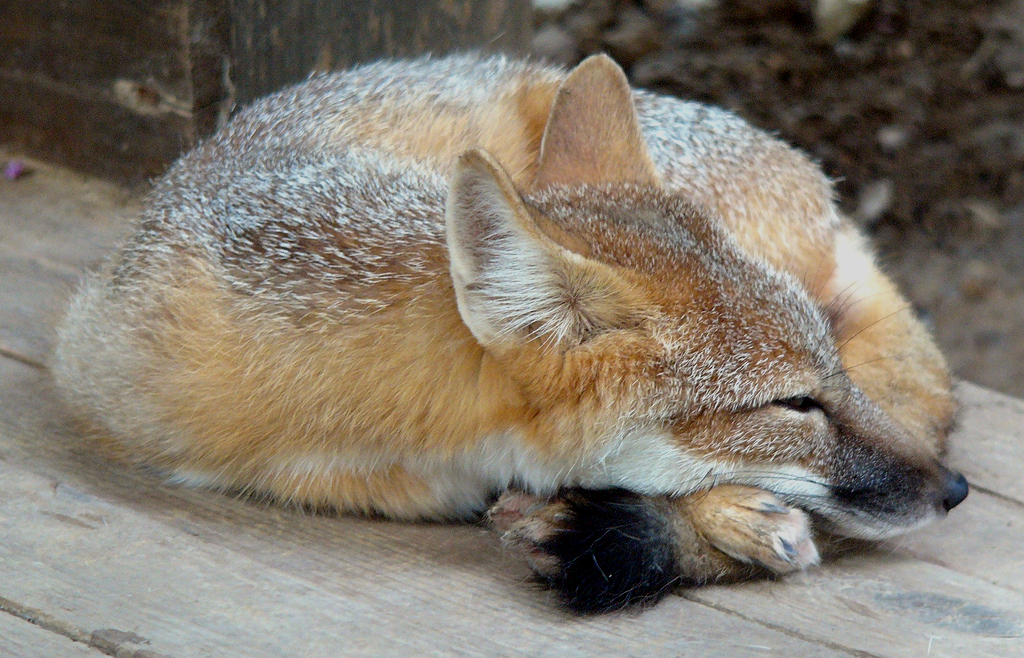
Swift fox

- Coyote, Canis latrans
- Gray wolf, Canis lupus extirpated
  - Northern Rocky Mountain wolf, C. l. irremotus extirpated
  - Great Plains wolf, C. l. nubilus EX
- Gray fox, Urocyon cineroeargenteus
- Swift fox, Vulpes velox
- Red fox, Vulpes vulpes

=== Felidae ===
- Bobcat, Lynx rufus
- Cougar, Puma concolor

=== Procyonidae ===
- Raccoon, Procyon lotor

=== Mephitidae ===
- Striped skunk, Mephitis mephitis
- Eastern spotted skunk, Spilogale putorius

=== Mustelidae ===
- North American river otter, Lontra canadensis
- Black-footed ferret, Mustela nigripes reintroduced
- Least weasel, Mustela nivalis
- Long-tailed weasel, Neogale frenata
- American mink, Neogale vison
- American badger, Taxidea taxus

=== Ursidae ===
- American black bear, Ursus americanus
- Brown bear, Ursus arctos extirpated
  - Grizzly bear, U. a. horribilis extirpated

== Order Artiodactyla ==
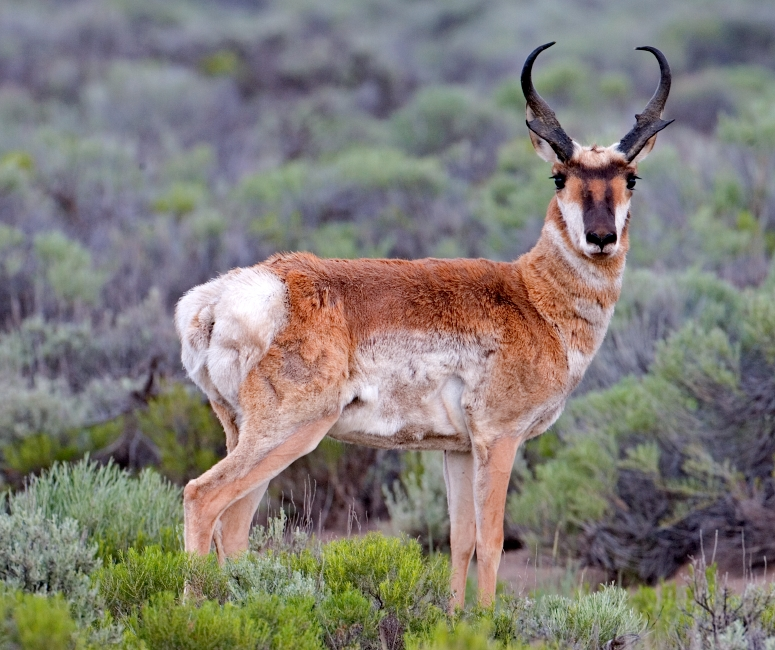
Pronghorn

=== Antilocapridae ===
- Pronghorn, Antilocapra americana

=== Bovidae ===
- American bison, Bison bison reintroduced
  - Plains bison, B. b. bison reintroduced
- Bighorn sheep, Ovis canadensis
- Mountain goat, Oreamnos americanus introduced

=== Cervidae ===
- Moose, Alces alces vagrant
- Elk, Cervus canadensis
- Mule deer, Odocoileus hemionus
- White-tailed deer, Odocoileus virginianus

== Order Lagomorpha ==
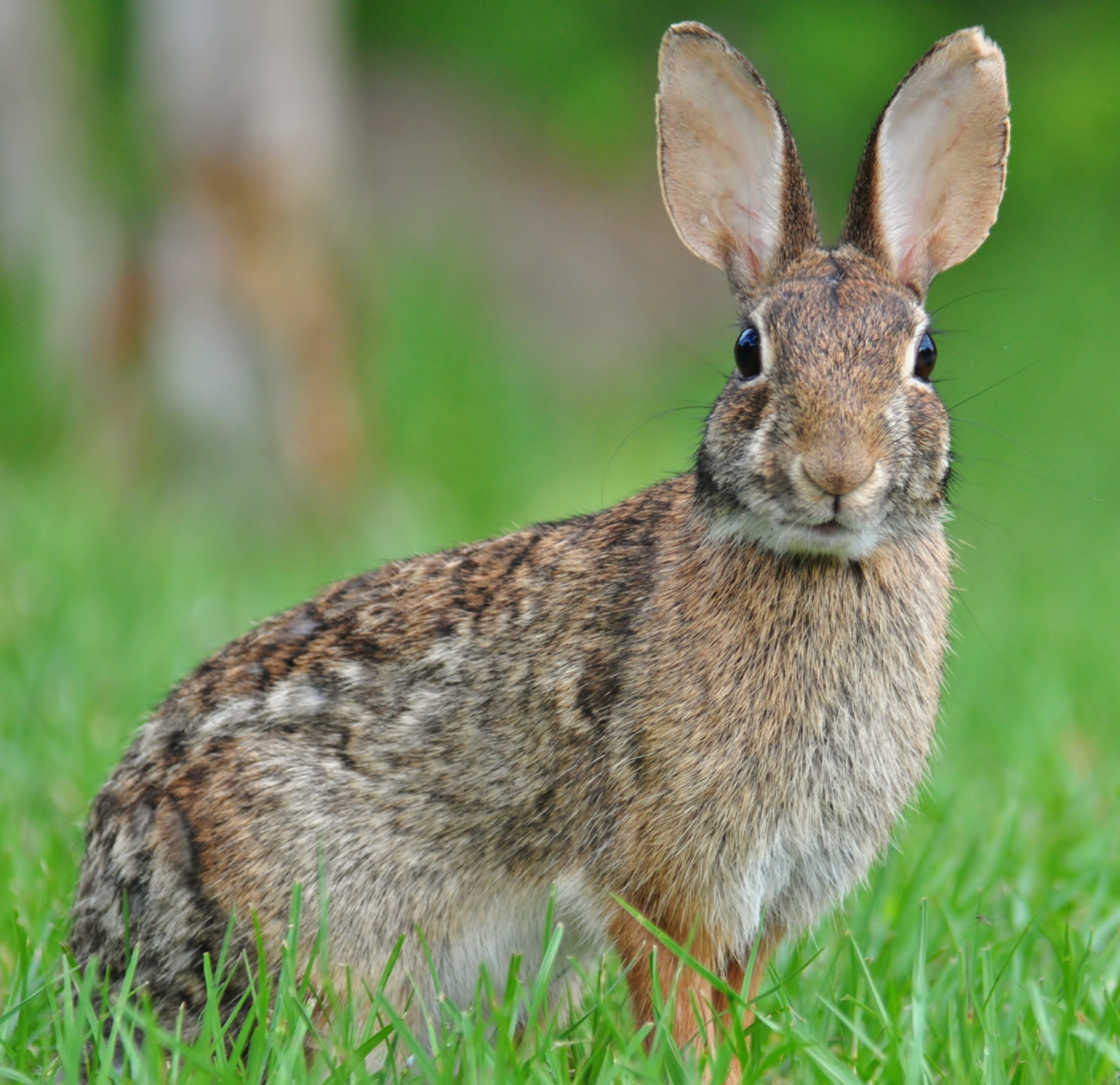
Eastern cottontail

=== Leporidae ===
- Black-tailed jackrabbit, Lepus californicus
- White-tailed jackrabbit, Lepus townsendii
- Desert cottontail, Sylvilagus audubonii
- Eastern cottontail, Sylvilagus floridanus
- Mountain cottontail, Sylvilagus nuttalii

== Order Rodentia ==
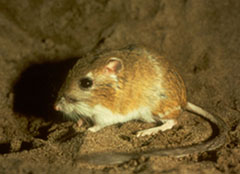
Ord's kangaroo rat

=== Castoridae ===
- American beaver, Castor canadensis

=== Cricetidae ===
- Southern red-backed vole, Clethrionomys gapperi
- Sagebrush vole, Lemmiscus curtatus
- Long-tailed vole, Microtus longicaudus
- Prairie vole, Microtus ochrogaster
- Western meadow vole, Microtus drummondii
- Bushy-tailed woodrat, Neotoma cinerea
- Muskrat, Ondatra zibethicus
- Northern grasshopper mouse, Onychomys leucogaster
- White-footed mouse, Peromyscus leucopus
- Western deer mouse, Peromyscus sonoriensis
- Western harvest mouse, Reithrodontomys megalotis
- Plains harvest mouse, Reithrodontomys montanus

=== Erethizontidae ===
- North American porcupine, Erethizon dorsatum

=== Geomyidae ===
- Plains pocket gopher, Geomys bursarius
- Northern pocket gopher, Thomomys talpoides

=== Heteromyidae ===
- Hispid pocket mouse, Chaetodipus hispidus
- Ord's kangaroo rat, Dipodomys ordii
- Olive-backed pocket mouse, Perognathus fasciatus
- Plains pocket mouse, Perognathus flavescens

=== Muridae ===
- House mouse, Mus musculus introduced
- Norway rat, Rattus norvegicus introduced

=== Sciuridae ===
- Least chipmunk, Eutamias minimus
- Black-tailed prairie dog, Cynomys ludovicianus
- Southern flying squirrel, Glaucomys volans
- Northern flying squirrel, Glaucomys sabrinus
- Yellow-bellied marmot, Marmota flaviventris
- Groundhog, Marmota monax
- Fox squirrel, Sciurus niger
- Franklin's ground squirrel, Spermophilus frankinii
- Richardson's ground squirrel, Spermophilus richardsonii
- Spotted ground squirrel, Spermophilus spilosoma
- Thirteen-lined ground squirrel, Spermophilus tridecemlineatus
- Eastern chipmunk, Tamias striatus
- American red squirrel, Tamiasciurus hudsonicus

=== Zapodidae ===
- Meadow jumping mouse, Zapus hudsonius
- Western jumping mouse, Zapus princeps

== See also ==
- List of prehistoric mammals
- Lists of mammals by region
- Mammal classification
