= List of mammals of North Dakota =

The list of mammals of North Dakota lists all mammal species that are seen in the U.S. state of North Dakota. 87 native species are known to live or have historically lived in the state. This includes mammals that are currently extirpated or locally extinct in North Dakota such as the Great Plains wolf, swift fox, caribou and grizzly bear. Plus 2 introduced mammals to North Dakota. The species on this list are grouped by order. It does not include mammals that are only found in captivity.

== Marsupials ==
=== Opossums ===
- Virginia opossum, Didelphis virginiana - accidental

== Moles and shrews ==
=== Shrews ===
- Northern short-tailed shrew, Blarina brevicauda
- Prairie shrew, Sorex haydeni
- Arctic shrew, Sorex arcticus
- Masked shrew, Sorex cinereus
- American pygmy shrew, Sorex hoyi
- American water shrew, Sorex palustris
- Merriam's shrew, Sorex merriami - rare
- Dwarf shrew, Sorex nanus - accidental

=== Moles ===
- Star-nosed mole, Condylura cristata
- Eastern mole, Scalopus aquaticus - accidental

== Bats ==
=== Vesper bats ===
- Big brown bat, Eptesicus fuscus
- Eastern red bat, Lasiurus borealis
- Hoary bat, Lasiurus cinereus
- Silver-haired bat, Lasionycteris noctivagans
- Little brown bat, Myotis lucifugus
- Northern long-eared bat, Myotis septentrionalis
- Western small-footed bat, Myotis ciliolabrum
- Long-legged myotis, Myotis volans
- Long-eared myotis, Myotis evotis
- Townsend's big-eared bat, Plecotus townsendii
- Fringe-tailed bat, Myotis thysanodes - accidental

=== Free-tailed bats ===
- Big free-tailed bat, Nyctinomops macrotis - accidental
- Mexican free-tailed bat, Tadarida brasiliensis - accidental

== Carnivores ==
=== Canids ===
- Coyote, Canis latrans
- Red fox, Vulpes vulpes
- Gray fox, Urocyon cineroeargenteus
- Gray wolf, Canis lupus - extirpated - accidental
  - Great Plains wolf, C. l. nubilus - extirpated
- Swift fox, Vulpes velox - extirpated

=== Felids ===
- Bobcat, Lynx rufus
- Cougar, Puma concolor
- Canada lynx, Lynx canadensis - extirpated

=== Raccoons ===
- Raccoon, Procyon lotor

=== Skunks ===
- Striped skunk, Mephitis mephitis
- Western spotted skunk, Spilogale gracilis - rare
- Eastern spotted skunk, Spilogale putorius - rare

=== Mustelids ===
- North American river otter, Lontra canadensis
- American marten, Martes americana
- Least weasel, Mustela nivalis
- American ermine, Mustela richardsonii
- Long-tailed weasel, Neogale frenata
- American mink, Neogale vison
- Fisher, Pekania pennanti
- American badger, Taxidea taxus
- Black-footed ferret, Mustela nigripes - reintroduced
- Wolverine, Gulo gulo - extirpated

=== Bears ===
- American black bear, Ursus americanus
- Brown bear, Ursus arctos - extirpated
  - Grizzly bear, U. a. horribilis - extirpated

== Even-toed ungulates ==
=== Deer ===
- Moose, Alces alces
- Elk, Cervus canadensis
- Mule deer, Odocoileus hemionus
- White-tailed deer, Odocoileus virginianus
- Caribou, Rangifer tarandus - extirpated
  - Boreal woodland caribou, R. t. caribou - extirpated

=== Pronghorns ===
- Pronghorn, Antilocapra americana

=== Bovids ===
- American bison, Bison bison - reintroduced
  - Plains bison, B. b. bison - reintroduced
- Bighorn sheep, Ovis canadensis - reintroduced

== Lagomorphs ==
=== Rabbits ===
- Snowshoe hare, Lepus americanus
- White-tailed jackrabbit, Lepus townsendii
- Desert cottontail, Sylvilagus audubonii
- Eastern cottontail, Sylvilagus floridanus
- Mountain cottontail, Sylvilagus nuttalii - extirpated

== Rodents ==
=== Beavers ===
- American beaver, Castor canadensis

=== New World mice ===
- Southern red-backed vole, Clethrionomys gapperi
- Sagebrush vole, Lagurus curtatus
- Long-tailed vole, Microtus longicaudus
- Prairie vole, Microtus ochrogaster
- Meadow vole, Microtus pennsylvanicus
- Bushy-tailed woodrat, Neotoma cinerea
- Muskrat, Ondatra zibethicus
- Northern grasshopper mouse, Onychomys leucogaster
- White-footed mouse, Peromyscus leucopus
- Western deer mouse, Peromyscus sonoriensis
- Western harvest mouse, Reithrodontomys megalotis
- Plains harvest mouse, Reithrodontomys montanus

=== Porcupines ===
- North American porcupine, Erethizon dorsatum

=== Pocket gophers ===
- Plains pocket gopher, Geomys bursarius
- Northern pocket gopher, Thomomys talpoides

=== Kangaroo rats and pocket mice ===
- Ord's kangaroo rat, Dipodomys ordii
- Hispid pocket mouse, Chaetodipus hispidus
- Plains pocket mouse, Perognathus flavescens
- Olive-backed pocket mouse, Perognathus fasciatus

=== Old World mice and rats ===
- House mouse, Mus musculus introduced
- Norway rat, Rattus norvegicus introduced

=== Squirrels ===
- Black-tailed prairie dog, Cynomys ludovicianus
- Thirteen-lined ground squirrel, Ictidomys tridecemlineatus
- Franklin's ground squirrel, Poliocitellus frankinii
- Richardson's ground squirrel, Urocitellus richardsonii
- Groundhog, Marmota monax
- Least chipmunk, Neotamias minimus
- Eastern chipmunk, Tamias striatus
- Fox squirrel, Sciurus niger
- Eastern gray squirrel, Sciurus carolinensis
- American red squirrel, Tamiasciurus hudsonicus
- Northern flying squirrel, Glaucomys sabrinus
- Yellow-bellied marmot, Marmota flaviventris - accidental
- Southern flying squirrel, Glaucomys volans - accidental
- Spotted ground squirrel, Xerospermophilus spilosoma - accidental

=== Jumping mice ===
- Meadow jumping mouse, Zapus hudsonius
- Western jumping mouse, Zapus princeps

== See also ==
- Lists of mammals by region
- Mammal classification
