= List of mammals of Iowa =

This is a list of mammals of Iowa. The list includes species native to the U.S. state of Iowa and introduced into the state. It also includes mammals currently extirpated in the state. This list does not include domesticated mammals.

== Opossums ==
Family: Didelphidae

- Virginia opossum, Didelphis virginiana

== Shrews ==
Family: Soricidae

- Northern short-tailed shrew, Blarina brevicauda
- North American least shrew, Cryptotis parva
- Cinereus shrew, Sorex cinereus
- American water shrew, Sorex palustris

== Moles ==
Family: Talpidae

- Eastern mole, Scalopus aquaticus

== Bats ==
Family: Vespertilionidae

- Big brown bat, Eptesicus fuscus
- Silver-haired bat, Lasionycteris noctivagans
- Eastern red bat, Lasiurus borealis
- Hoary bat, Lasiurus cinereus
- Little brown bat, Myotis lucifugus
- Northern myotis, Myotis septentrionalis
- Indiana bat, Myotis sodalis
- Evening bat, Nycticeius humeralis
- Tricolored bat, Perimyotis subflavus

== Lagomorphs ==
Family: Leporidae

- White-tailed jackrabbit, Lepus townsendii
- Eastern cottontail, Sylvilagus floridanus

== Rodents ==
Family: Castoridae

- American beaver, Castor canadensis

Family: Cricetidae

- Southern red-backed vole, Clethrionomys gapperi
- Prairie vole, Microtus ochrogaster
- Woodland vole, Microtus pinetorum
- Eastern meadow vole, Microtus pennsylvanicus
- Muskrat, Ondatra zibethicus
- Northern grasshopper mouse, Onychomys leucogaster
- White-footed mouse, Peromyscus leucopus
- Eastern deer mouse, Peromyscus maniculatus
- Southern bog lemming, Synaptomys cooperi
- Western harvest mouse, Reithrodontomys megalotis

Family: Erethizontidae

- North American porcupine, Erethizon dorsatum extirpated

Family: Geomyidae

- Plains pocket gopher, Geomys bursarius

Family: Heteromyidae

- Plains pocket mouse, Perognathus flavescens

Family: Muridae

- House mouse, Mus musculus introduced
- Norway rat, Rattus norvegicus introduced

Family: Zapodidae

- Meadow jumping mouse, Zapus hudsonius

Family: Sciuridae

- Black-tailed prairie dog, Cynomys ludovicianus extirpated
- Groundhog, Marmota monax
- Thirteen-lined ground squirrel, Ictidomys tridecemlineatus
- Franklin's ground squirrel, Poliocitellus franklinii
- Eastern gray squirrel, Sciurus carolinensis
- Fox squirrel, Sciurus niger
- Eastern chipmunk, Tamias striatus
- American red squirrel, Tamiasciurus hudsonicus
- Southern flying squirrel, Glaucomys volans

== Carnivorans ==
Family: Canidae

- Coyote, Canis latrans
- Gray wolf, Canis lupus extirpated
- Red wolf, Canis rufus extirpated
- Gray fox, Urocyon cinereoargenteus
- Swift fox, Vulpes velox
- Red fox, Vulpes vulpes

Family: Ursidae

- American black bear, Ursus americanus

Family: Procyonidae

- Raccoon, Procyon lotor

Family: Mephitidae

- Striped skunk, Mephitis mephitis
- Eastern spotted skunk, Spilogale putorius

Family: Felidae

- Canada lynx, Lynx canadensis extirpated
- Bobcat, Lynx rufus
- Cougar, Puma concolor extirpated

Family: Mustelidae

- Wolverine, Gulo gulo extirpated
- North American river otter, Lontra canadensis
- American marten, Martes americana extirpated
- Least weasel, Mustela nivalis
- American ermine, Mustela richardsonii
- Long-tailed weasel, Neogale frenata
- American mink, Neogale vison
- Fisher, Pekania pennanti extirpated
- American badger, Taxidea taxus

== Even-toed ungulates ==
Family: Antilocapridae

- Pronghorn, Antilocapra americana extirpated

Family: Bovidae

- American bison, Bison bison extirpated

Family: Cervidae

- Moose, Alces alces extirpated
- Elk, Cervus canadensis extirpated
- Mule deer, Odocoileus hemionus
- White-tailed deer, Odocoileus virginianius
- Caribou, Rangifer tarandus extirpated
