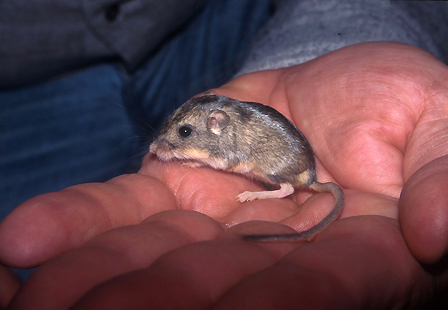

Conservation status
- Critically Imperiled (NatureServe)

- Endangered (ESA)

Scientific classification
- Kingdom: Animalia
- Phylum: Chordata
- Class: Mammalia
- Order: Rodentia
- Family: Heteromyidae
- Genus: Perognathus
- Species: P. longimembris
- Subspecies: P. l. pacificus

Trinomial name
- Perognathus longimembris pacificus Mearns, 1898

= Pacific pocket mouse =

Subspecies of rodent

The Pacific pocket mouse (Perognathus longimembris pacificus) is a subspecies of little pocket mouse that is endemic to California. Despite its common name, the Pacific pocket mouse belongs to the Heteromyidae family, making it more closely related to beavers than to mice. It lives in sandy coastal soils across a variety of open vegetation environments, including coastal sage scrub, dunes, strands, mesas, and drainages. The Pacific pocket mouse primarily feeds on seeds, supplemented with forbs (e.g. Erodium) and native vegetation (e.g. Stipa). For 20 years there were no reports of the species remaining in existence. It was believed to be extinct until 1993, when a small population was discovered in Dana Point headlands, a coastal region in Orange County, California. Three more populations have since been found in Marine Corps Base Camp Pendleton in north San Diego County. It is now a federally listed Endangered animal species due to habitat loss and fragmentation.

== Physical description ==
As members of Heteromyidae—which consists of animals surviving on seeds and grain—Pacific pocket mice have fur-lined cheek pouches externally. Most of the body is covered in fur that feels silky. The coats are spineless and bristle free. The color of the Pacific pocket mouse is linked to the environment they live in, hence they are the color of the soil. The dorsal side of the pocket mouse is usually brown and pinkish while the ventral is usually white. There are typically two patches of hair that are lighter at the base of the ear, a distinguishing mark of the Pacific pocket mouse. The tail can either be distinctly or indistinctly bicolored. The soles of the hind feet are hairy, which are also the distinguishing marks on the Pacific pocket mouse (along with the two patches of hair that are lighter at the base of the ear).

The young baby of a pocket mouse is called a "pinkie, kitten or pup." The females are called "does" and the males are known as "bucks." The pocket mouse group is called a "nest, colony, harvest, horde or mischief." The skull and hind foot of the Pacific pocket mouse are almost the smallest of all the pocket mouse species.

Individuals range from 4.25 inches (108 mm) to 5.2 inches (130 mm) in length from the nose to the tip of the tail which makes them amongst the smallest subspecies of pocket mice. The tail of the pocket mouse is 2.125 inches (54.0 mm). The height of the pocket mouse is .625 in (15.9 mm). They weigh usually from 0.25 to 0.33 oz (7.1 to 9.4 g).

A pocket mouse can have 8 to 10 pups (baby mice) every year.

== Habitat and distribution ==
The Pacific pocket mouse is endemic to the immediate coast of southern California from Marina del Rey and El Segundo in Los Angeles County, south to the vicinity of the U.S.-Mexican border in San Diego County. They have not been recorded farther than 2.5 miles (4.0 km) away from the ocean.

They are found in fine-grain or sandy areas that are close to the Pacific Ocean. Their habitat consists of coastal strand, coastal dunes, and coastal sage scrub growing on marine terraces.

Coastal Sage Scrub Habitat

== General and social behavior ==
The Pacific pocket mouse is the smallest mammal that hibernates. They hibernate during the winter season. During hibernation they feed on seed caches that are stored in their burrows. They eat the seeds of grasses and forbs, and they also eat leafy material. A Pacific pocket mouse lives around seven years in captivity and about three to five years in the wild.

Pacific pocket mice normally only interact with their own species. Interactions are experienced within their own habitat. When they are not interacting with one another they are escaping predators that roam their habitat. Predators such as a gray fox and feral or domestic cats threaten the survival of the Pacific pocket mouse. Along with trying to avoid such predators they are also in danger because of the exotic Argentine ants. These ants invade the coastal sage scrub areas of the Pacific pocket mouse's habitat. The Pacific pocket mouse has been on the endangered species list since 1994.

Often described as “ecosystem gardeners,” Pacific pocket mice play a crucial role in their environment as they cycle soil nutrients into the soil through burrow-digging and dispersing native plant seeds through their droppings, benefiting the native wildlife of Southern California’s coastal ecosystems.

=== Reproduction ===
Like other heteromyids, the Perognathus longimembris pacificus (Pacific pocket mouse) is generally asocial and solitary. Other than during reproduction, they do not engage in direct social interactions often. There is relatively little information on the breeding biology of the Pacific pocket mouse. The Pacific pocket mouse does not reproduce offspring in large quantities or at a high speed. Most females typically produce one litter per year, sizing from about two to eight pups; occasionally, females may produce two litters in one year. Generally, the breeding season for the Pacific pocket mouse is the months April through July, peaking in the spring. But, the breeding season can vary due to a few factors. The temperature, amount of food available, and the quantity of plant growth around the Pacific pocket mouse's habitat can all affect its breeding season. In years with lower than average rainfall, reproduction may not take place. The gestation period for the Pacific pocket mouse lasts for twenty-two to twenty-three days. Newly born mice are smaller than one inch long and weigh less than one gram. As a mammal, the first thing Pacific pocket mouse subsists on is its mother's milk. Young are weaned after approximately thirty days. The Pacific pocket mouse attains sexual maturity two to five months after birth, but a small number of young may be able to breed less than a month after weaning.

In the wild, the Pacific pocket mouse lives about three to five years. The life span of a Pacific pocket mouse is sporadic because of their vulnerability in their own habitat. The Pacific pocket mouse is very simple. They stay within the habitat of their birth and feed on simple vegetation that are available within their surroundings. In captivity, its longevity increases to approximately four to six years, usually no longer than seven and one-half years. However, one mouse, held at the San Diego Zoo, has lived for 9 years and 209 days as of February, 2023. In captivity, Pacific pocket mice are able to breed and reproduce more times than in the wild.

=== Feeding behavior ===
The Pacific pocket mouse's diet consists of seeds, nuts, and green vegetation, when available. These granivores will leave the burrow at night to gather the seeds, in order to avoid direct contact with the desert sun. Most of these seeds and vegetation can be found in bushes or small shrubbery close to the burrow. When seeds are not easily accessible, the mouse will use its forelimbs to dig holes in order to find resources. Due to the harsh climate, many pocket mice are susceptible to droughts, heat, and extreme temperature changes that can happen within the day. It can live for long periods of time without water by using the moisture from its food and digestive system.

A pocket mouse is highly influenced when seeking its food. Many foraging factors play a part in a pocket mouse's dietary needs. These factors can range from:

1. Seed size: The size of the seed can determine how filling it will be.

2. Density of food supply: This aspect can determine if a pocket mouse will have enough resources available within a certain distance of its burrow.

3. Nutritional value: This determines if the food is healthy and adequate enough to last through harsh environmental changes.

4. Predation Risk: Pocket mice living in highly vulnerable predator areas are less likely to scavenge for food and must do so with caution.

5. Type of soil: If the soil is too hard, pocket mice must find other means of obtaining their food.

When a pocket mouse has found sufficient seeds, it will begin to store these resources in its fur-lined cheeks. These pockets can vary in length from three inches (76 mm) to twelve. The sizes of the pockets are determined by the ratio of body length and jumping span. These pockets aid the mouse by trimming the amount of time and energy needed to scavenge over a period of time. Its pouches also allow the mouse to survive when there is limited food or predation risk. Once the pocket mouse has filled its cheeks with the seeds, it will scurry down into its burrow to unload its provisions. These seeds are then stored in certain compartments within its burrow. When the time comes, these seeds will be taken out of storage and used as food for the pocket mouse. If supplies are low, a pocket mouse will leave the burrow to refill its supply. Also, during the spring and autumn months, pocket mice will forage more often in order to prepare for the coming of summer and winter when it will be harder to find food. Adults hibernate from around September to April and stay in their burrows for five months during the winter, alternating between dormancy and feeding on stored seeds. Pocket mice will remain active during winters of abundant food.

== Endangered species and conservation efforts ==
Perognathus longimembris pacificus (Pacific pocket mouse) was believed to be extinct for nearly 20 years until it was rediscovered in 1993. It was immediately placed on emergency listings by the U.S. Fish and Wildlife Service and received full protection status in 1994. In September 1997 the U.S. Fish and Wildlife Service published a recovery plan for the Pacific pocket mouse with the intent of down listing its status to threatened by the year 2023. In attempts to conserve the Pacific pocket mouse the U.S. Fish and Wildlife Service is focusing its efforts on stabilizing current populations, searching for new populations, and establishing additional populations by means of the release of captive-bred individuals. Their goal is to protect the Pacific pocket mouse until it is no longer necessary.

Marine Corps Base Camp Pendleton in San Diego and the city of Dana Point have expressed deep concern for the protection of the Pacific pocket mouse. The United States Marine Corps has authorized the relocation of the Pacific pocket mouse to off-base sites in order to create new populations. The Dana Point City Council unanimously supported a residential development proposal that would give the Pacific pocket mouse 70 acres (280,000 m^{2}) in the Dana Point Headlands in 1998. They also decided that the Dana Point Headlands Pacific pocket mouse property would be privately owned. In 2010, as part of a U.S.G.S. project at Camp Pendleton, scat detection dogs from Conservation Canines were used to locate Pacific pocket mice. They discovered a 5-fold increase in occupied habitat. In 2024, Marine Corps Base Camps Pendleton, in partnership with San Diego Zoo Wildlife Alliance and Fish and Wildlife Service, stood up a new, protected population of Pacific pocket mouse on the installation and augmented that population in 2025 with mice from a captive breeding program.

In 2012, the San Diego Zoo Wildlife Alliance established the Pocket Mouse Conservation Breeding Facility at the San Diego Zoo Safari Park with the goal of producing the most fit offspring for release, since a translocation program was deemed too risky due to the mice’s small population. Researchers at the facility have so far doubled the number of mice there through successful breeding. In order to ensure that these offspring are able to fend for themselves when released into the wild, researchers are currently conducting behavior training so that they are able to avoid predators and forage for the right types of food.

In 2016, to prepare the Pacific pocket mouse for reintroduction, researchers from the San Diego Wildlife Alliance used genetic modeling to pick the best group of mice and transitioned their diet to native seeds. Researchers trained the mice before releasing them using simulated threats to ensure their natural survival instincts remain when they encounter native predators. As a result of their efforts, the San Diego Wildlife Alliance has reintroduced more than 500 Pacific pocket mice in the past 20 years.

Pacific pocket mouse acclimation cage at release site

=== Threats to species ===
The principal threats to the species and the cause of its present reduced state are habitat destruction, degradation, and fragmentation. These threats are due to different kinds of area development such as urban, agricultural, residential, and recreational. Other threats include ground disturbances or vegetation removal from grading, ripping, or off-road driving. Impacts from construction of roads, railroads, airports and other structures also impact the survival of the Pacific pocket mouse. The loss of groundwater and or blow-sand necessary for habitat maintenance is significant to this species' survival. Because this mouse is a sensitive species, factors such as illegal trash dumping, invasive species, domestic animal predators, vehicular roadway threats, and inadequate regulatory mechanisms affect the species' well being, not to mention the elevated extinction risks that can play a common role on greatly reduced populations.

Five factors figure into whether or not a species may be determined endangered or threatened. One of those factors is the present or threatened destruction, modification and curtailment of its habitat or range. This is recognized as a form of destruction, modification and curtailment of Pacific pocket mouse habitat and range. This was a major factor in affording it endangered status. Both physical and biological features figure into an organism's critical habitat. In the case of the Pacific pocket mouse, its physical requirements are sandy loamy soil and its biological requirements are a suite of plant communities including coastal sage scrub and grassland. Due to interaction of demographic, genetic, and environment factors, small populations are more susceptible to extinction than larger populations. In addition to the ongoing threats to its habitat, several development projects are proposed or approved within core habitat areas.

== See also ==
- Endemic fauna of California
- Fauna of the California chaparral and woodlands
