= White-eared pocket mouse =

Conservation status
- Vulnerable (IUCN 3.1)

- Imperiled (NatureServe)

Scientific classification
- Kingdom: Animalia
- Phylum: Chordata
- Class: Mammalia
- Order: Rodentia
- Family: Heteromyidae
- Genus: Perognathus
- Species: P. alticola

Binomial name
- Perognathus alticola Rhoads, 1894

Synonyms
- Perognathus alticolus Rhoads, 1894 [orth. error]

Species of rodent

The white-eared pocket mouse (Perognathus alticola) is a species of rodent in the family Heteromyidae. It is endemic to the San Bernardino Mountains and the Tehachapi Mountains of southern California in the United States. There are two subspecies of P. alticola in California, P. a. alticola and P. a. inexpectatus, both of which are considered species of special concern by the California Department of Fish and Wildlife.

== Characteristics ==
White-eared pocket mice are native to the San Bernardino Mountains and Tehachapi Mountains in California. They are named after their feature of having white or yellowish hair on the external portion of their ear. Within the genus Perognathus, P. alticola is on the medium to large size. The back of the mouse is yellowish brown with blackish lines and the underbelly of it is white. The tail typically has two or three colors. The under portion is white and the top portion matches the back of the mouse with the tip of the tail being black or dusky in color. The body length, tail length, hind foot length and length of many other feature of the male is much larger than the female. This means they are sexually dimorphic based on size.

=== Anatomy ===
Body Feature Length Measurements	Average (mm)	Range (mm)
Total Body Length	155	142-177
Tail	80	70-95
Hind Foot	21	19-32
Ear	6	5-6
Greatest Length of Cranium	24.1	22.5-26.1
Nasal	9.2	8.2-11.0
Maxillary	10.6	8.0-13.9
Mandible	12.8	11.9-14.2
Maxillary Toothrow	3.5	2.9-3.8

=== Sexually dimorphic measurements ===
Average Measurement (mm)	Males	Females
Total Length	163.6	149.5
Body Length	77.6	72.5
Tail Length	21.9	20.7
Ear Length	5.9	5.6
Greatest Depth of Cranium	8.2	8.0
Greatest With of Cranium	12.9	12.4

== Distribution ==
White-eared pocket mice are only found in California. They can be found in Kern county, Los Angeles county, San Bernardino County and the San Bernardino Mountains. They inhabit arid shrubs and forests at elevations greater than 1,500 m (4,900 ft).

== Ecology ==
Perognathus alticola can be found in Ponderosa pine forest and open pine forest with bracken ferns Pteridium aquilinum, in wooded habitats that contain Joshua tree and pinyon-juniper woodland, and in grasslands with scattered Ponderosa pine. They can also be found in chaparral, coastal-sage, and areas with an abundance of Salsola .
