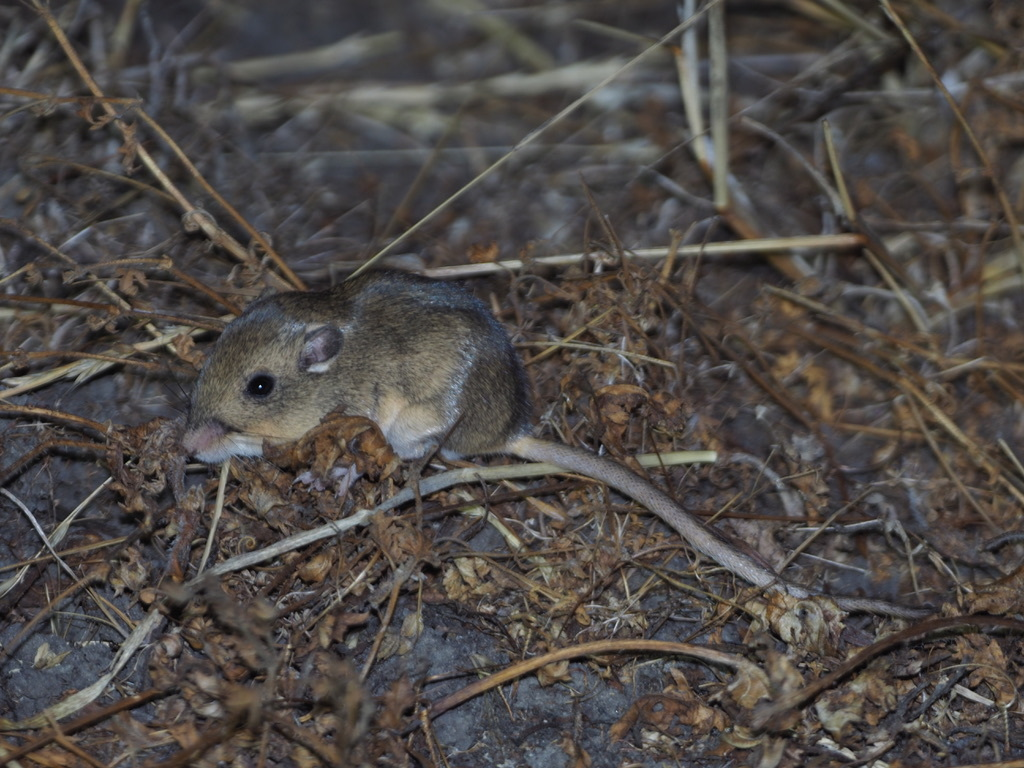

Conservation status
- Least Concern (IUCN 3.1)

Scientific classification
- Kingdom: Animalia
- Phylum: Chordata
- Class: Mammalia
- Infraclass: Placentalia
- Order: Rodentia
- Family: Heteromyidae
- Genus: Perognathus
- Species: P. inornatus

Binomial name
- Perognathus inornatus Merriam, 1889

= San Joaquin pocket mouse =

Species of rodent

The San Joaquin pocket mouse or Salinas pocket mouse (Perognathus inornatus) is a species of rodent in the family Heteromyidae. It is endemic to California in the United States where it lives in desert or semi-desert habitats.

== Description ==
Pocket mice can be distinguished from similar smaller rodents by their externally opening fur-lined cheek pouches. They differ from the kangaroo mice in not having the soles of the feet entirely covered in fur. Kangaroo rats have fur-lined pockets, but they are larger, and have a dark stripe across the hips, and dark stripes on both the top and bottom surfaces of the tail.

The San Joaquin pocket mouse has a total length of about 128 to 160 mm (5.0 to 6.3 in), including a tail of 65 to 78 mm (2.6 to 3.1 in). The tail has a short tuft of hairs at its tip. The fur on the head and body is short and soft, without spines or bristles. The colour is buff, and there is sometimes a pale patch at the base of the small rounded ears. The tail is identically coloured on its upper and lower surfaces.

== Distribution ==
This pocket mouse is endemic to California in the United States. It is found in the Tehachapi Mountains and the lower slopes of the western Sierra Nevada at elevations of up to 600 m (2,000 ft). It also occurs in the upper Sacramento Valley, the San Joaquin Valley, the Salinas Valley, and southwards to the Mojave Desert. It occurs in the "Upper Sonoran life zone", characterized by grassland and semi-desert vegetation, and the "Lower Sonoran life zone", hot desert with creosote bush and Joshua tree.

== Ecology ==
The San Joaquin pocket mouse feeds on seeds of grasses and various plants, carrying them back to its burrow in its cheek pouches. It may also eat soft-bodied invertebrates. It stores seed surplus to its immediate requirements in the chambers inside the burrow for use at times of year when food is scarce. It may become torpid in winter. Breeding takes place between March and July, and there may be two or more litters of four to six young per year.

== Status ==
P. inornatus has a wide range and is common in suitable habitats within that range. It seems to be secure within its range, and no particular threats have been identified except in the north, where agricultural development is destroying and fragmenting its habitat. The International Union for Conservation of Nature has listed its conservation status as being of "least concern".
