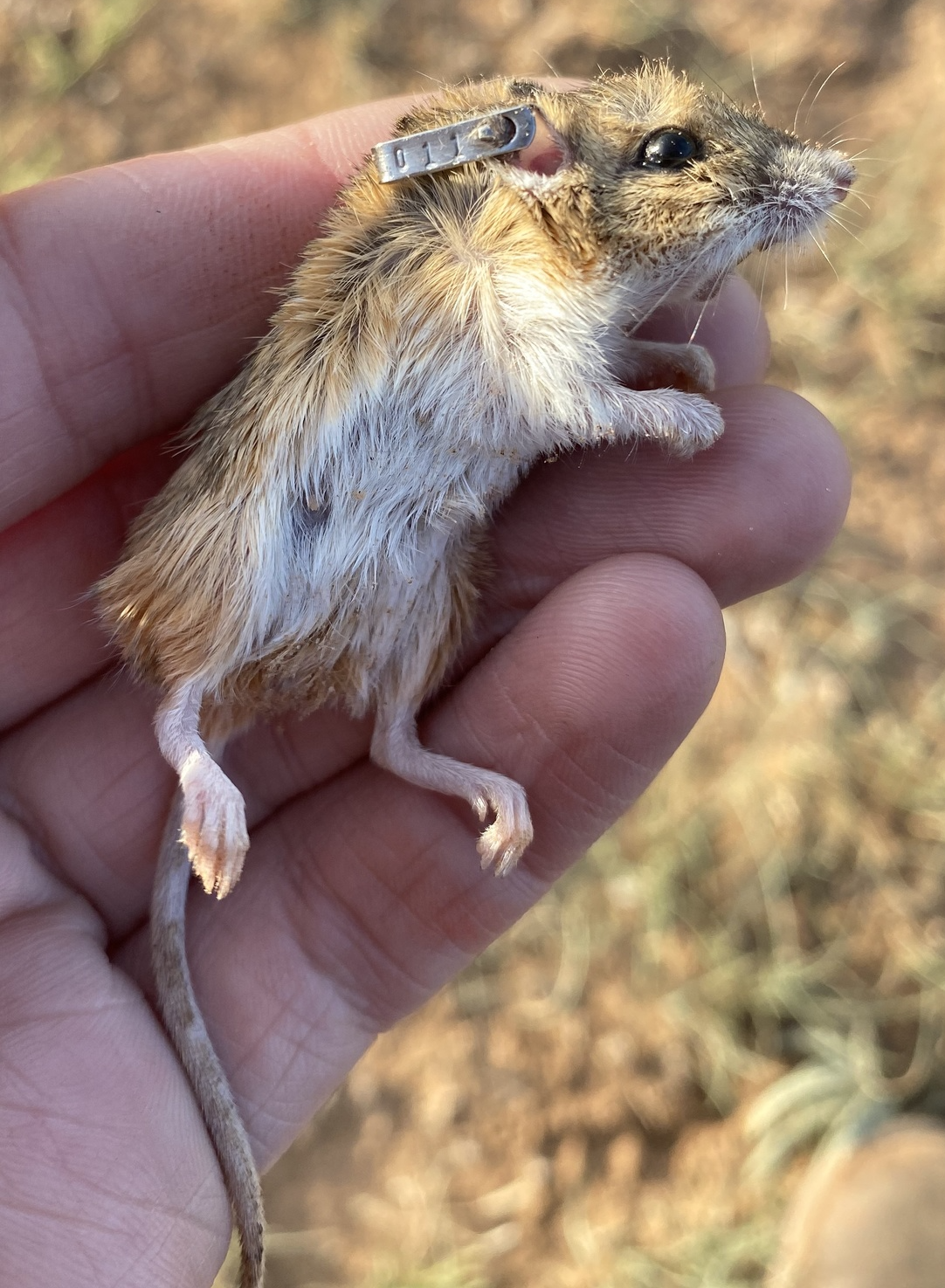

Conservation status
- Least Concern (IUCN 3.1)

Scientific classification
- Kingdom: Animalia
- Phylum: Chordata
- Class: Mammalia
- Order: Rodentia
- Family: Heteromyidae
- Genus: Perognathus
- Species: P. merriami

Binomial name
- Perognathus merriami J. A. Allen, 1892

= Merriam's pocket mouse =

Species of rodent

Merriam's pocket mouse (Perognathus merriami) is a species of rodent in the family Heteromyidae. It is found in northeast Mexico and New Mexico, Oklahoma and Texas in the United States. Its habitat is shortgrass prairie, desert areas with scrub and arid shrubland. The species is named to honor Clinton Hart Merriam, a biologist who first described several other members of the genus Perognathus, and first elucidated the principle of a "life zone" as a means of characterizing ecological areas with similar plant and animal communities.

== Description ==
Merriam's pocket mouse is a small species with a smooth silky coat. Adults average 115 mm (4.5 in) in total length including a tail averaging 65 mm (2.6 in) but the size and shade vary across the animal's range. The general color is yellowish with a dark sheen caused by the longer guard hairs having black tips. The underparts, legs and feet are white or creamy in color, and the tail is paler on its undersurface. There are dark streaks on the side of the face and a pale ring surrounds the eye. There is a white spot on the inner margin of the ear, a white patch under the ear and a small buff one behind it.

== Behavior ==
Merriam's pocket mouse is mainly nocturnal and spends the day in a shallow burrow with several entrances. It excavates tunnels by digging with its forefeet and pushing soil backwards with its hind feet, spreading the spoil over the surface of the ground. There are short side tunnels, some used for depositing fecal pellets and others for storing seeds. The mouse has a home range with several burrows located within it, and sometimes conceals itself under rocks or fallen mesquite trees. An entrance to a burrow is often located at the base of a grass tussock or other plant, the roots of which stabilise the earth, and is loosely plugged with soil when the mouse is inside. In one of the burrows is a nest chamber. This has food stores round the edge and a nest of grass, small twigs and husks at one side. In Texas, breeding takes place between March and November. A litter normally consists of three to six young and there may be more than one litter in the year.

At temperatures below 10 °C (50 °F) Merriam's pocket mouse becomes torpid and in some parts of Texas it may become dormant or hibernate in winter. Animals caught by live trapping on a cold night can appear dead in the morning but soon recover when warmed. The diet consists primarily of seeds which it carries back to its burrow in its cheek pouches and consumes there, leaving a littering of husks on the floor. Excess food is cached in store rooms in the burrow. It may also eat some greenstuff and insects. It does not need to drink water because its requirements are met from its food and it passes small quantities of very concentrated urine. In captivity, a Merriam's pocket mouse has lived on a diet of seeds but without water for four years, but the lifespan of wild individuals is shorter and may be in the range of 22 to 33 months.

When both are caught in a single trap, the northern grasshopper mouse (Onychomys leucogaster) has been known to eat Merriam's pocket mouse. Larger predators include the barn owl (Tyto alba), the burrowing owl (Athene cunicularia), the long-eared owl (Asio otus), the loggerhead shrike (Lanius ludovicianus) and gray foxes.

== Status ==
Merriam's pocket mouse has a wide range including some protected areas and a presumed large total population. It is common in places but has a patchy distribution. The population trend is steady and the animal faces no known major threats, so the IUCN has listed it as being of "least concern".
