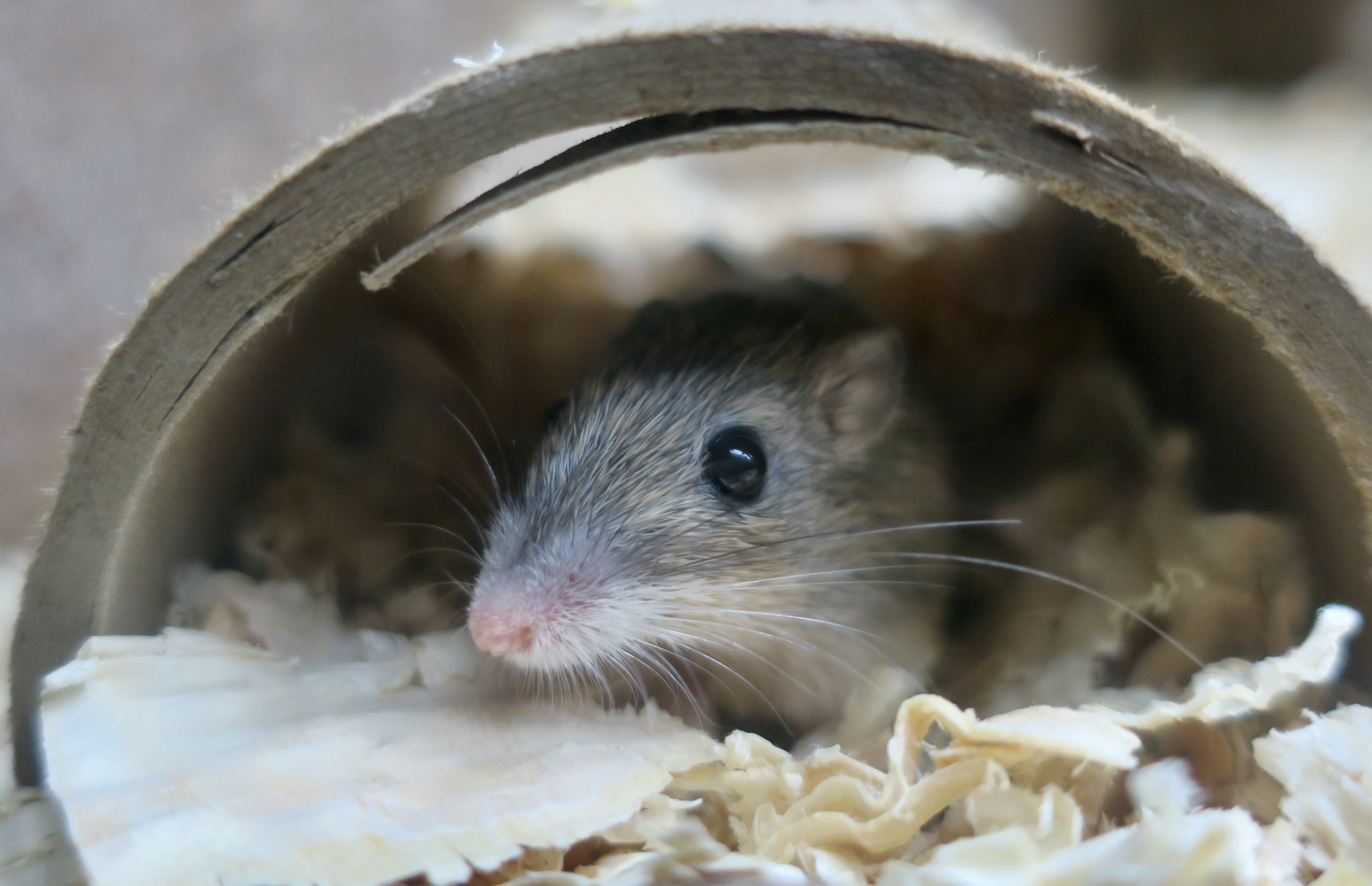
- At Wildlife World Zoo.

Conservation status
- Least Concern (IUCN 3.1)

Scientific classification
- Kingdom: Animalia
- Phylum: Chordata
- Class: Mammalia
- Order: Rodentia
- Family: Heteromyidae
- Genus: Perognathus
- Species: P. amplus

Binomial name
- Perognathus amplus Osgood, 1900

= Arizona pocket mouse =

Species of rodent

The Arizona pocket mouse (Perognathus amplus) is a rodent native to the Sonoran Desert. It is a small mouse with a thinly furred tail that is smooth from base to tip (i.e. it has no tuft). In color it ranges from tan to orange. It is a nocturnal, burrowing animal. It eats seeds, which it carries back to its burrow in its cheek pouches.
