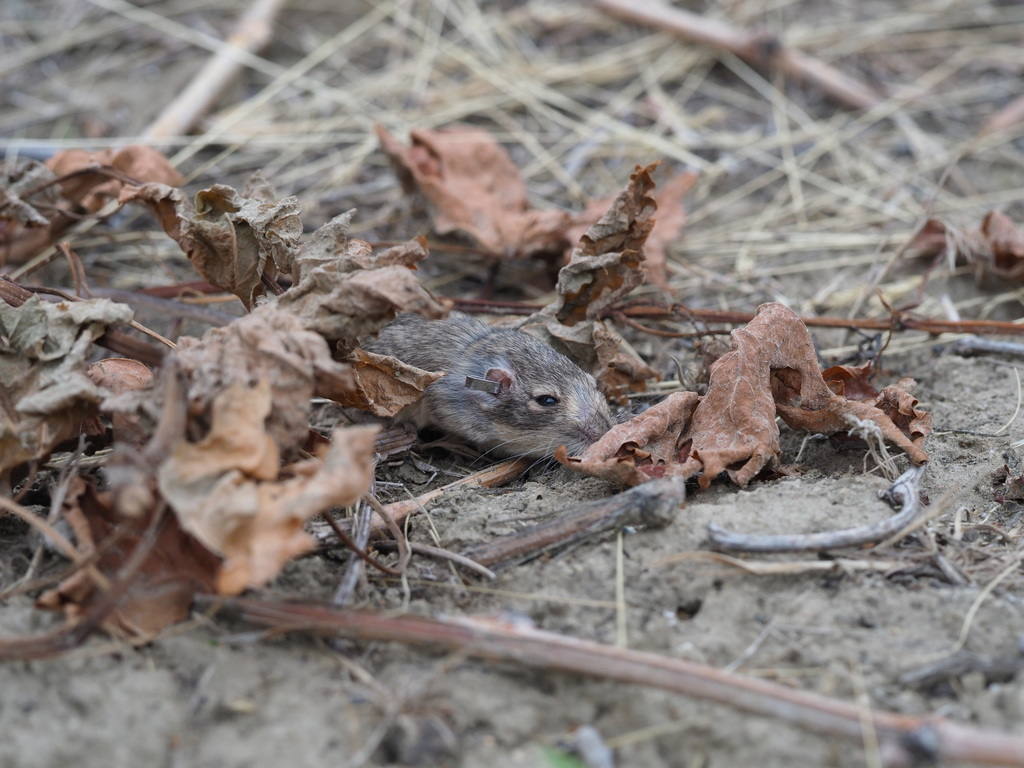
- Individual observed in Okanagan Valley, Canada.

Conservation status
- Least Concern (IUCN 3.1)

Scientific classification
- Kingdom: Animalia
- Phylum: Chordata
- Class: Mammalia
- Infraclass: Placentalia
- Order: Rodentia
- Family: Heteromyidae
- Genus: Perognathus
- Species: P. parvus

Binomial name
- Perognathus parvus (Peale, 1848)

Synonyms
- Perognathus xanthanotus Grinnell, 1912

= Great Basin pocket mouse =

Species of rodent

The Great Basin pocket mouse (Perognathus parvus) is a species of rodent in the family Heteromyidae. It is found in British Columbia in Canada and the western United States.

== Taxonomy ==
There are several subspecies of P. parvus. Sulentich and Genoways and Brown classify the yellow-eared pocket mouse as P. p. xanthonus Grinell, a subspecies of the Great Basin pocket mouse. However, Jones and others classify the yellow-eared pocket mouse as a distinct species, P. xanthonotus (Grinnell).

== Distribution ==
The Great Basin pocket mouse occurs in the Columbia River Basin and the Great Basin and adjacent lands. It is distributed from south-central British Columbia and eastern Washington south to southeastern California, Nevada and northern Arizona, and east to southeastern Montana and Wyoming. Distribution of subspecies is:

- Perognathus parvus bullatus: (Durrant and Lee) – central and east-central Utah
- P. p. clarus (Goldman) – extreme southwestern Montana; southeastern Idaho; extreme north-central Utah; extreme southwestern Wyoming
- P. p. columbianus (Merriam) – central and southern Washington
- P. p. idahoensis (Goldman) – south-central Idaho
- P. p. laingi (Anderson) – south-central British Columbia
- P. p. lordi (Gray) – extreme south-central British Columbia; central and eastern Washington; northwestern Idaho
- P. p. mollipilosus (Coues) – south-central Oregon; north-central and northeastern California
- P. p. olivaceus (Merriam) – most of Nevada; eastern California; extreme southeastern Oregon; southern Idaho; western Colorado; the most widely distributed subspecies
- P. p. parvus (Peale) – southeastern Washington; central and eastern Oregon
- P. p. trumbullensis (Benson) – southern Colorado; northern Arizona
- P. p. yakimensis (Broadbooks) – south-central Washington

The yellow-eared pocket mouse occurs on the eastern slope of the Tehachapi Mountains in Kern County, California. It is not certain whether its distribution is disjunct or joins that of P. parvus olivaceus.

== Plant communities ==
The Great Basin pocket mouse occupies steppes and open, arid shrublands and woodlands. It most commonly occurs in sagebrush (Artemisia spp.), shadscale (Atriplex confertifolia), and other desert shrublands, and in pinyon-juniper (Pinus-Juniperus spp.) woodland. On the eastern slope of the Cascade Range and the Sierra Nevada, it occurs in ponderosa pine (P. ponderosa) and Jeffrey pine (P. jefferyi) woodlands. Riparian zones may have larger concentrations of Great Basin pocket mice than upland areas.

== Timing of major life events ==
In late fall and winter, Great Basin pocket mice remain in their burrows in a state of torpor. They emerge from their burrows and mate in early spring. Males emerge slightly before females. In south-central Washington, Great Basin pocket mice emerged from March to April. Prebreeding enlargement of ovaries and testes begins in winter in the complete darkness of the burrow. Following emergence from the burrow, the lengthening photoperiod of spring apparently triggers final enlargement and development of gonads for breeding. Access to succulent green vegetation in spring may enhance reproductive success of females. Captive female Great Basin pocket mice from eastern Washington fed lettuce and seeds had significantly larger ovaries than control females fed only seeds. Great Basin pocket mice remain reproductively active through summer. Females produce one or two litters per year. Most first litters are delivered in May and second litters in August. Reports of average litter size have ranged from 3.9 in south-central Washington to 5.6 in Nevada. First-litter subadults first leave the natal burrow in early summer; subadults from the second litter first emerge in fall. In a 2-year study in south-central Washington, first-litter subadults first emerged in June, and second-litter subadults first emerged in October (1974) and November (1975).

As it signals the beginning of the breeding season, photoperiod may often signal its end. In the laboratory, an artificial short day-long night summer photoperiod caused gonadal shrinkage in Great Basin pocket mice. A favorable diet apparently overrides this effect, however, extending the breeding season. In nature, Great Basin pocket mice remain reproductively active through fall in years of favorable plant production. Juveniles typically breed in their second year, but first-litter individuals may first reach breeding condition before winter when plant productivity is high.

Great Basin pocket mice occupy open, arid terrain. They seek friable soil of a variety of textures for burrowing.

Home ranges of 7,060 to 9,630 square feet (656 to 895 m^{2}) have been reported for Great Basin pocket mice in British Columbia. Males may have larger home ranges than females. Average home ranges reported from south-central Washington are between 23,030 and 33,640 square feet (2,140 and 3,125 m^{2}) for adult males and 15,564 square feet (1,445.9 m^{2}) for adult females. In big sagebrush habitat on the Malheur National Wildlife Refuge, Oregon, home ranges of adult males were significantly greater (p < 0.001) than home ranges of females. Reproductively active adult males had significantly (p < 0.05) larger home ranges than adult males with unenlarged testes. In black greasewood (Sarcobatus vermiculatus) habitat, however, there were no significant differences between male and female home ranges or between home ranges of reproductive and nonreproductive adult males.

== Cover requirements ==
Great Basin pocket mice are nocturnal and use burrows for daytime cover. They also use burrows during periods of winter and summer torpor. The winter burrow consists of a 3-to-6-foot (0.91 to 1.83 m) deep tunnel leading to a chamber lined with dry vegetation. The summer burrow is shallow. Except for mothers with young, the burrow is occupied by a single individual.

== Food habits ==
Great Basin pocket mice consume primarily seeds, but eat some green vegetation. Prior to production of seeds, they also consume insects. Great Basin pocket mice do not use free water, they metabolize water from food. Pocket mice (Perognathus spp.) and other heteromyids are scatterhoarders, caching seeds in shallow depressions and covering the seeds with soil. The seeds are primarily those of grass species, and some preferred forb species. Indian ricegrass (Oryzopsis hymenoides), cheatgrass (Bromus tectorum), Russian-thistle (Salsola kali), antelope bitterbrush (Purshia tridentata), pigweed (Amaranthus spp.), and mustard (Brassica spp.) seeds are important Great Basin pocket mouse food items. In productive years, cheatgrass seeds formed a major portion of the diet of Great Basin pocket mice in southeastern Washington.

Seeds of medusahead (Taeniatherum caput-medusae) were not used by Great Basin pocket mice in Lassen County, California, and areas with heavy medusahead invasion were avoided.

Estimated seed intake of a Great Basin pocket mouse is from 4% to 10% of total body weight daily. Assuming a wholly cheatgrass diet, an individual requires 870 to 1,000 seeds per day in spring and summer, and about 750 seeds per day in fall. Estimated daily maintenance energy requirement ranges from a winter low of 2.4 kilocalories (males) and 2.6 kilocalories (females) to a high of 7.0 kilocalories (males) and 6.6 kilocalories (females) in spring. A total of about 1.8 to 2.1 ounces (51 to 60 g) of seed must be cached to meet the winter energy requirement. To conserve energy when food is scarce in summer, Great Basin pocket mice often enter a state of torpor that lasts a few hours.

Great Basin pocket mice are fairly successful at finding buried seed caches, even those buried by other individuals. In a laboratory experiment, Great Basin pocket mice found Indian ricegrass seeds 17.5% of the time when researchers cached seeds 1.3 centimetres (0.51 in) below ground; 42.5% of the time when seeds were cached 0.6 centimetres (0.24 in) below ground; and 100% of the time when seeds were scattered on the soil surface.

== Predators ==
Owls (Tytonidae and Strigidae), including northern saw-whet owls (Aegolius acadicus) and burrowing owls (Speotyto cunicularia) hawks (Accipitridae), coyotes (Canis latrans), foxes (Vulpes and Urocyon spp.), weasels (Mustelidae), skunks (Mephitidae), and snakes prey on Great Basin pocket mice.
