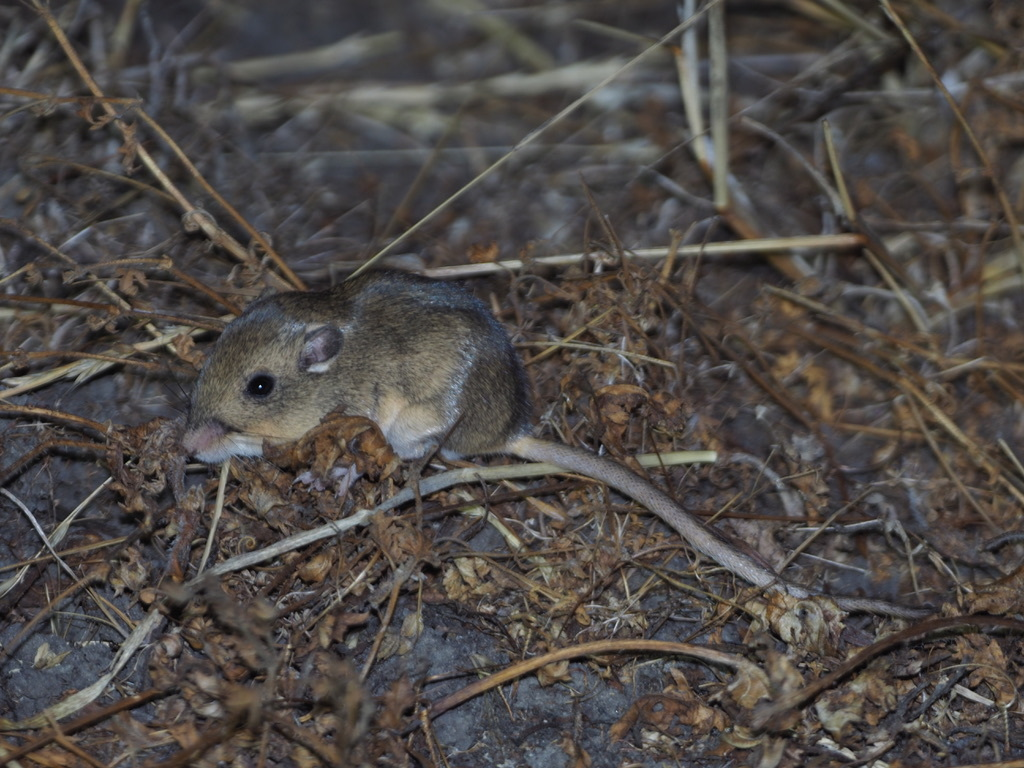
- Perognathus inornatus

Scientific classification
- Kingdom: Animalia
- Phylum: Chordata
- Class: Mammalia
- Infraclass: Placentalia
- Order: Rodentia
- Family: Heteromyidae
- Subfamily: Perognathinae
- Genus: Perognathus; Wied-Neuwied, 1839

Type species
- Perognathus fasciatus Wied-Neuwied, 1839

Species
- Perognathus alticola Perognathus amplus Perognathus fasciatus Perognathus flavescens Perognathus flavus Perognathus inornatus Perognathus longimembris Perognathus merriami †Perognathus minutus Perognathus parvus
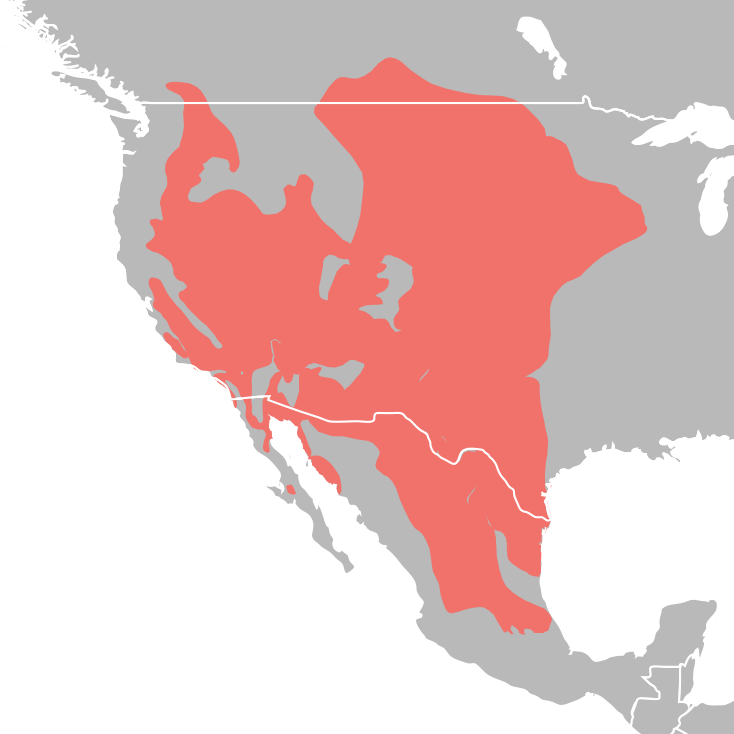
- Perognathus distribution

= Perognathus =

Perognathus Temporal range: Early Miocene - Recent

Genus of pocket mice

Perognathus is a genus of pocket mouse. Like other members of their family they are more closely related to pocket gophers than to true mice.

== Characteristics ==
The silky pocket mice are small animals with soft pelage, long tails, and small feet compared to other heteromyids. They have long claws which are used for digging burrows and sifting sandy substrates for seeds. They have also been found to steal seeds from kangaroo rats' dens. They store these seeds in large hairy external cheek pouches. They are nocturnal and are found in arid habitats. They are not true hibernators, but will go into torpor and stay in their burrows for extended periods of time.

== Species ==
- Perognathus alticola — White-eared pocket mouse
- Perognathus amplus — Arizona pocket mouse
- Perognathus fasciatus — Olive-backed pocket mouse
- Perognathus flavescens — Plains pocket mouse
- Perognathus flavus — Silky pocket mouse
- Perognathus inornatus — San Joaquin pocket mouse, endemic to California.
- Perognathus longimembris — Little pocket mouse, native to Northwestern Mexico, California, and the Southwestern United States.
  - Perognathus longimembris pacificus — Pacific pocket mouse, an endangered species endemic to coastal Southern California.
- Perognathus merriami — Merriam's pocket mouse
- Perognathus parvus — Great Basin pocket mouse, native to the Great Basin region.

Sometimes members of the genus Chaetodipus are placed in Perognathus.
