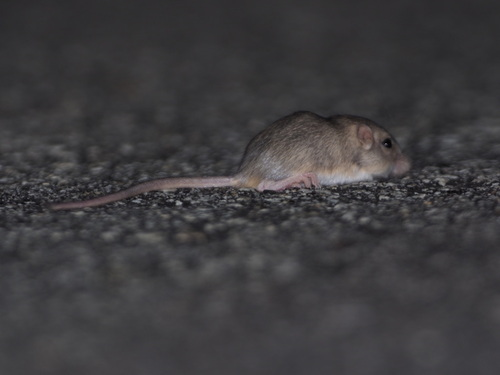

Conservation status
- Least Concern (IUCN 3.1)

Scientific classification
- Kingdom: Animalia
- Phylum: Chordata
- Class: Mammalia
- Order: Rodentia
- Family: Heteromyidae
- Genus: Perognathus
- Species: P. longimembris

Binomial name
- Perognathus longimembris (Coues, 1875)

= Little pocket mouse =

Species of rodent

The little pocket mouse (Perognathus longimembris) is a species of rodent in the family Heteromyidae. It is found in Baja California and Sonora in Mexico and in Arizona, California, Idaho, Nevada, Oregon and Utah in the United States. Its natural habitat is subtropical or tropical dry lowland grassland. It is a common species and faces no particular threats; the IUCN has listed it as being of "least concern".

Five mice of this species travelled to and orbited the Moon 75 times in an experiment on board the Apollo 17 command module in December 1972. Four of the mice survived the trip. Six other little pocket mice were sent into orbit with Skylab 3 in July 1973, though these animals died only 30 hours into the mission due to a power failure.

== Behavior ==
This small mouse, with a long tail, inhabits arid and semiarid habitats with grasses, sagebrush and other scrubby vegetation. It is nocturnal and has a short period of activity for the first two hours after sunset, and then sporadic activity through the rest of the night. It sleeps in winter and is only active between April and November with numbers building up rapidly in the spring, peaking in June and July. It forages for seeds, plant material and small invertebrates which it carries back to its burrow in its cheek pouches.

== Status ==
The little pocket mouse is common within most of its range although it is scarce in Baja California. The population appears to be steady and no particular threats have been identified for this species so the International Union for Conservation of Nature has assessed it as being of "least concern".

== See also ==
- Pacific pocket mouse (Perognathus longimembris pacificus) — an endangered subspecies from coastal Southern California.
