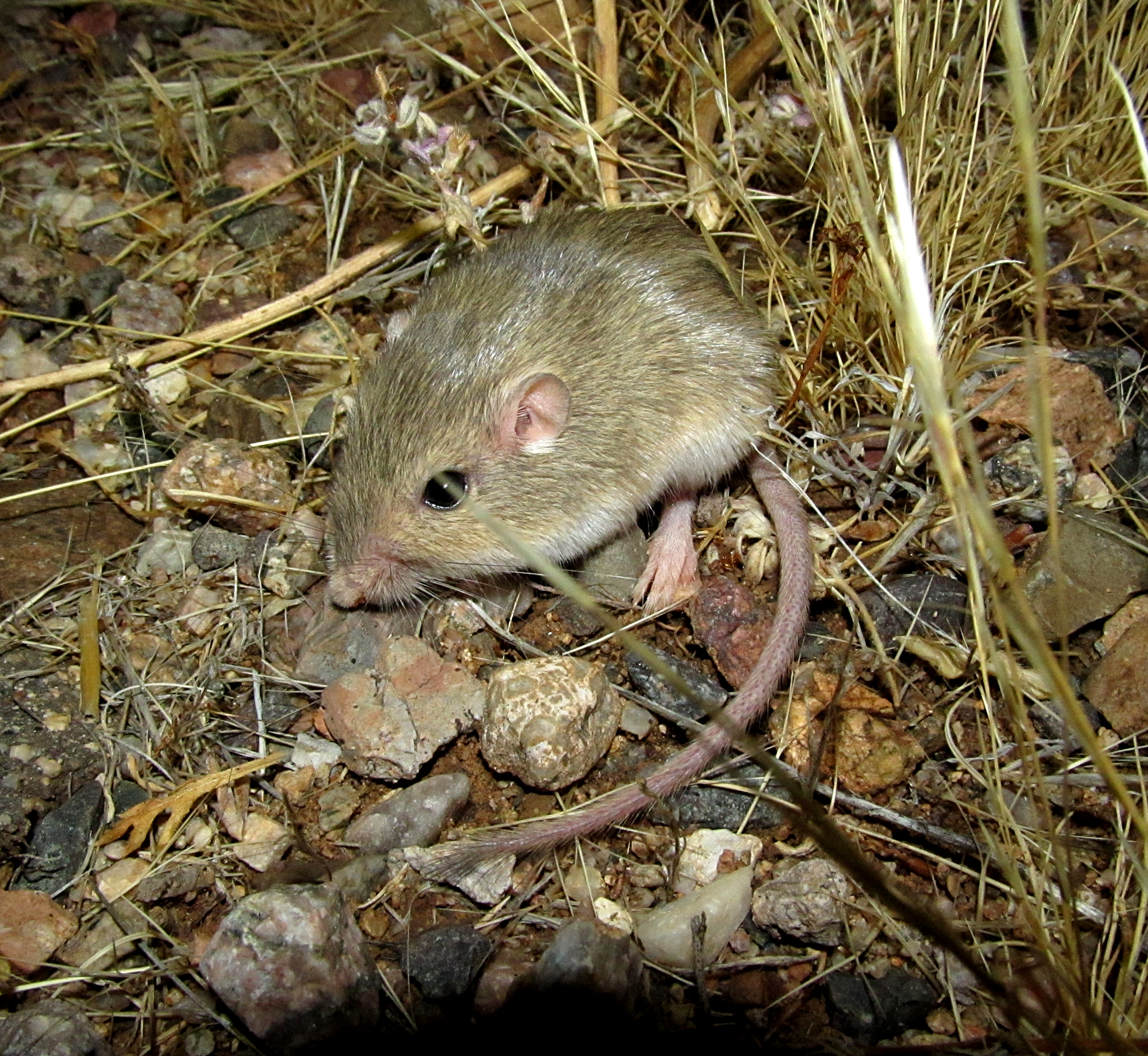
- In Pinal County, Arizona

Conservation status
- Least Concern (IUCN 3.1)

Scientific classification
- Kingdom: Animalia
- Phylum: Chordata
- Class: Mammalia
- Order: Rodentia
- Family: Heteromyidae
- Genus: Perognathus
- Species: P. flavus

Binomial name
- Perognathus flavus Baird, 1855
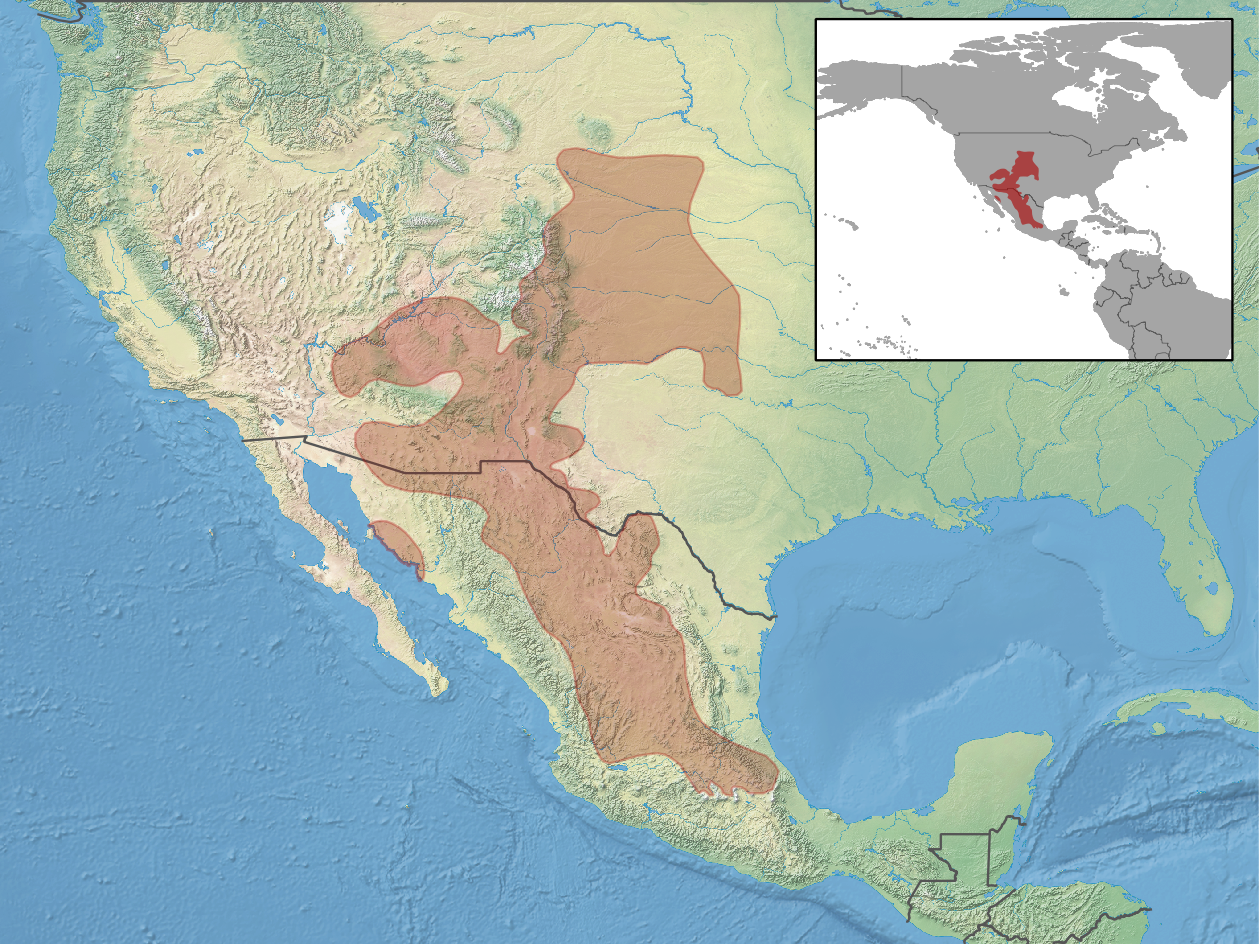
- Silky pocket mouse distribution in brown

= Silky pocket mouse =

Species of rodent

The silky pocket mouse (Perognathus flavus) is a species of rodent in the family Heteromyidae. It is found in northern and central Mexico and the southwest region of the United States. It is a species of least concern, according to the IUCN, with no known major threats. The silky pocket mouse eats seeds, succulent parts of plants and nuts, and carries food in its cheek pouches. It lives in low valley bottoms with soft soils, among weeds and shrubs, where it burrows in the sand to bury seed caches. The species is more tolerant of harsh habitat conditions than other pocket mice.

== Description ==
The silky pocket mouse is the smallest pocket mouse in the family Heteromyidae, though otherwise is very similar in appearance to the other members of the genus Perognathus. Its relatively short tail, which is buff or dusky colored above and white below, does not have a tuft of hair at the tip and is always shorter than the combined length of the head and body, which average about 60 mm (2.4 in). The upper parts are ochre or yellowish-buff, with many black-tipped hairs. The underparts and the forelegs are white. Behind the ears there are clear buff patches without black-tipped hairs and there is a narrow strip of plain buff between the dorsal coloring and the underparts. The species exhibits little sexual dimorphism, but the male tends to have a slightly longer tail.

== Distribution and habitat ==
The silky pocket mouse is endemic to the southern United States and Mexico. It is present in the states of South Dakota, Nebraska, Utah, Colorado, Kansas, Arizona, New Mexico, Texas and Oklahoma and possibly Wyoming (where it may be extinct). In Mexico, it is present in most of the central plateau. The silky pocket mouse occurs in arid and semiarid grassland, sandy and rocky places, Pinus - Juniper areas, Artemisia flats, shrublands and areas with Yucca and cactus.

== Behavior ==
The silky pocket mouse is mainly nocturnal and lives in a burrow by day. In warmer weather it consumes cached food in the afternoon before emerging on the surface to forage in the evening. It mostly collects grass and weed seeds but also eats some green leafy material. It takes the husks off the seeds before storing them in its cheek pouches and carrying them back to its burrow where they are cached. A silky pocket mouse collects an average of .154 g (0.01 oz) of seed on each sortie. When a pile of 25 g (0.88 oz) was deposited near a burrow (sufficient for maintenance for up to 10 days), the pocket mouse collected and stored it all in one night, and still emerged to forage on succeeding nights. In cold weather it occasionally forages by day, and in really bad weather it may not come out of the burrow for several days.

The silky pocket mouse has a home range that extends to a distance of about 60 meters (200 ft) from its burrow, with males often having larger ranges than females. When it moves fast, the silky pocket mouse proceeds with short, kangaroo-like bounds, but at slower speed it walks. It requires no water at relative humidities between 25 and 60%, obtaining its moisture needs from its food. When the ambient temperature is low (below 5 °C (41 °F)), it allows its body temperature to fall by about 6 °C (43 °F) and enters short periods of torpor. In between these it eats some of its stored seeds in the afternoon before emerging from its burrow to forage in the evening before temperature falls too low.

The silky pocket mouse often uses a burrow excavated by the banner-tailed kangaroo rat (Dipodomys spectabilis), whether it is occupied or empty, or sometimes shares a burrow made by a Phillips' kangaroo rat (Dipodomys phillipsii). Abandoned pocket gopher mounds are often tunnelled by the silky pocket mouse.

Silky pocket mouse burrows may be open or closed (with the entrance blocked loosely with soil) in different parts of the range. In Colorado, entrances to the burrows are often at the foot of a prickly pear, yucca or low shrub, while in New Mexico they are often underneath Artemisia, Chrysothamnus or Atriplex, dug into the low mounds of soil that often accumulate there. Tracks in the dusty sand have been found leading to and from nearby seed-laden plants such as Helianthus, other composite plants and Croton. There are usually several entrances to the burrow and a complex system of tunnels and rooms. The central chamber is usually less than 20 cm (8 in) below the main entrance and is 8 to 10 cm (3 to 4 in) in diameter. From it, a long tunnel leads down to the rather larger nesting chamber. The nest is situated there and is globular and made of dried grasses and surrounded by seed hulls. A typical nest is about 6.5 cm (2.6 in) in diameter. About eight tunnels radiate from the nesting chamber, some of which terminate in a storage room in which seeds or husks are cached and hidden behind loose soil.

Reproduction takes place during most of the year in New Mexico; in Arizona it peaks in February and May. A typical litter of three or four young (range one to six) is born after a gestation period of 22 to 26 days. The young open their eyes after about 15 days and are weaned 15 days later. Longevity averages about 3.3 months, but some individuals live for twenty months, and in captivity some have survived for five years. The population density varies between seasons and years.

== Status ==
The silky pocket mouse has a wide range and is common in most of that range. In Arizona there is an isolated subspecies, P. f. goodpastori, which has a restricted range. This subspecies is considered threatened, but in general the silky pocket mouse faces no particular threats and is present in a number of protected areas. The IUCN lists it as being of "least concern".
