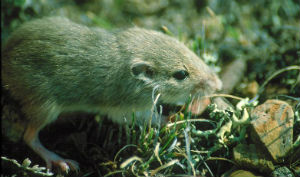

Conservation status
- Least Concern (IUCN 3.1)

- Secure (NatureServe)

Scientific classification
- Kingdom: Animalia
- Phylum: Chordata
- Class: Mammalia
- Order: Rodentia
- Family: Heteromyidae
- Genus: Perognathus
- Species: P. fasciatus

Binomial name
- Perognathus fasciatus Wied-Neuwied, 1839

= Olive-backed pocket mouse =

Species of rodent

The olive-backed pocket mouse (Perognathus fasciatus) is a species of rodent in the family Heteromyidae. It is found in the central Great Plains of Canada and the United States, where it is widespread and relatively common; the IUCN considers it to be of "least concern".

== Description ==
An adult olive-backed pocket mouse ranges in length from about 125 to 143 mm (4.9 to 5.6 in) including a tail of 56 to 68 mm (2.2 to 2.7 in), with individuals from the northern end of the range being larger than those from the south. It weighs 11 to 14 g (0.4 to 0.5 oz). The fur on the head, back, and sides ranges from dark olive-brown in the eastern part of its range to pale buff in the west. The underparts are white, or occasionally buff, with a narrow cream-colored lateral line separating the two colors. There is a buff-colored spot behind the ear.

== Distribution and habitat ==
The olive-backed pocket mouse inhabits the Great Plains of Canada and the United States. Its range extends from Alberta, Saskatchewan, and Manitoba southwards through Montana and Wyoming to Utah, Colorado, and South Dakota. Its natural habitat is grassland in arid and semi-arid upland areas, usually with sparse vegetation and sometimes with scattered trees such as the aspen or cottonwood (Populus sp.) and plants such as the fringed sagebrush (Artemisia frigida). It has also been observed on a sandy floodplain close to the Little Missouri and among rocky outcrops on grassy hillsides in the same vicinity. On similar hillsides in Nebraska, the vegetation included yucca and ponderosa pine. Its burrows are found in both sandy and clayey soils.

== Behavior ==
The olive-backed pocket mouse is nocturnal and lives underground in an extensive burrow system with tunnels that may reach a depth of 2 m (6 ft 7 in) and spread for 3 m (9.8 ft) on either side of the entrance. The major part of the diet is seeds of weed species, which are collected in the cheek pouches, the excess being stored in chambers in the burrow. It also consumes some green parts of plants. Breeding takes place during the summer months, and one or more litters of usually four to six young are produced. The gestation period is about thirty days. In some regions, it is reported not to hibernate, but in Alberta, it may spend up to eight months in hibernation. The extensive caches of seeds in the burrow can help sustain the pocket mouse during the autumn, winter, and early spring when it does not emerge above ground. Mice kept in captivity were found to hide seeds below the surface of the soil, appearing to find the caches again at a later date by smell, probing the soil with their snout. They were also seen cleaning their cheek pouches by emptying them of food and rubbing them in the sand.

== Status ==
The olive-backed pocket mouse is widely distributed across the central Great Plains region of Canada and the United States. It is present in many protected areas, it is locally common, it faces no major threats, and its population seems to be steady. For these reasons, the IUCN has listed the species as being of "least concern".
