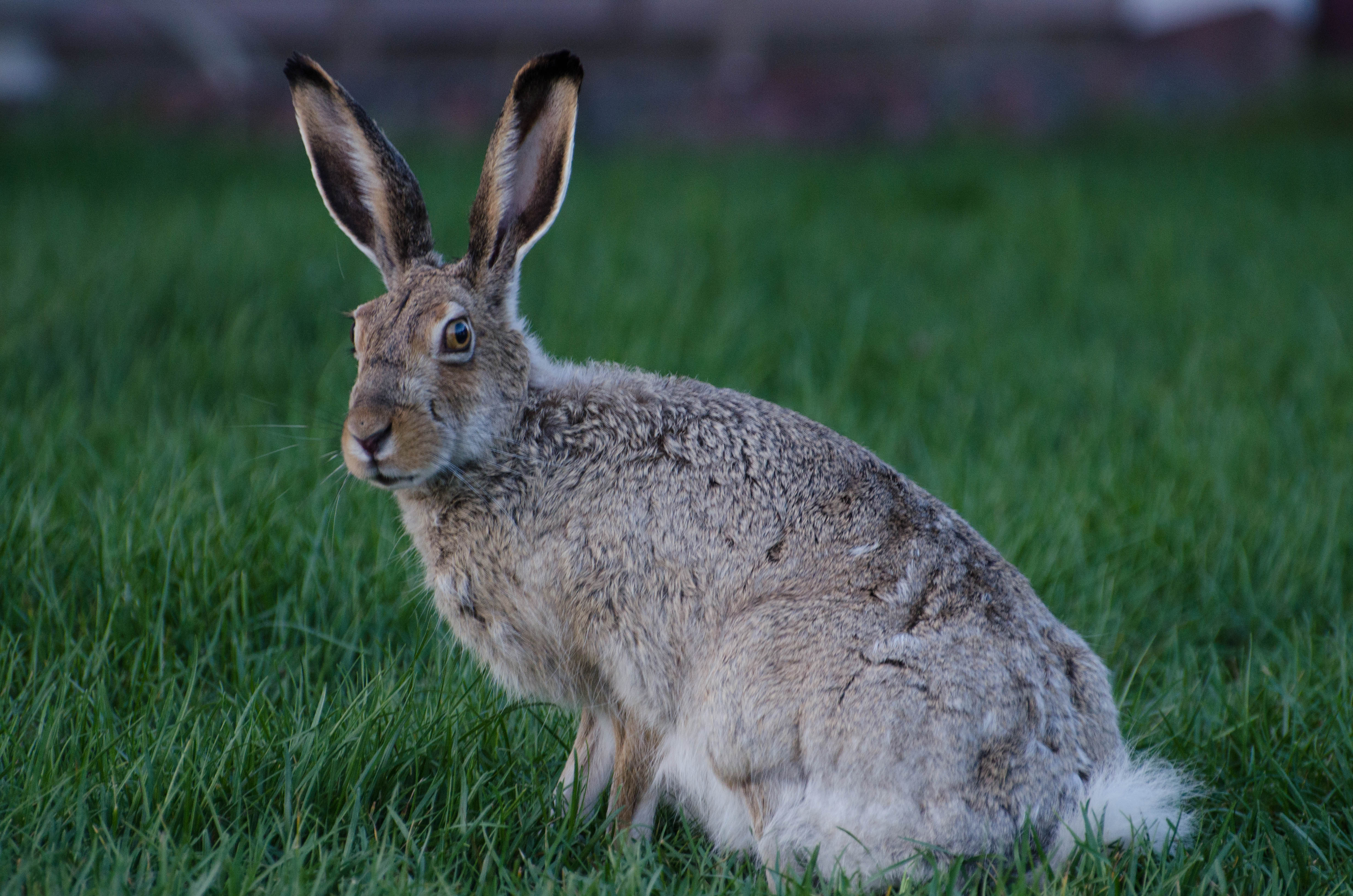

Conservation status
- Least Concern (IUCN 3.1)

Scientific classification
- Kingdom: Animalia
- Phylum: Chordata
- Class: Mammalia
- Order: Lagomorpha
- Family: Leporidae
- Genus: Lepus
- Species: L. townsendii

Binomial name
- Lepus townsendii Bachman, 1839
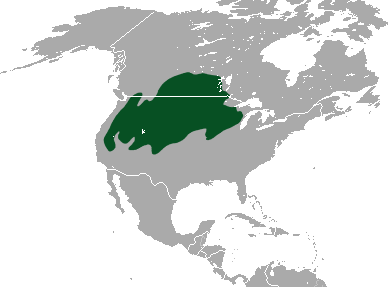
- White-tailed jackrabbit range

= White-tailed jackrabbit =

Species of mammal

The white-tailed jackrabbit (Lepus townsendii), also known as the prairie hare and the white jack, is a species of hare found in western North America. Like all hares and rabbits, it is a member of the family Leporidae of order Lagomorpha. It is a solitary individual except where several males court a female in the breeding season. Litters of four to five young are born in a form, a shallow depression in the ground, hidden among vegetation. This jackrabbit has two described subspecies: L. townsendii townsendii occurring west of the Rocky Mountains and L. townsendii campanius occurring east of the Rocky Mountains.

== Description ==
The white-tailed jackrabbit is a large species of hare and is the largest species called "jackrabbit". (Note: Two larger hares, the Arctic and Alaskan hares, are found further north in North America.) This jackrabbit has an adult length of 22 to 26 inches (56 to 65 centimeters), including a tail measuring 2.6 to 4.0 in (6.6 to 10.2 cm), and a weight between 5.5 and 9.5 pounds (2.5 and 4.3 kilograms). From winter to spring, weight tends to increase in females due to pregnancy, but decrease in males due to the stresses of reproductive competition. Thus, females in Iowa went from averaging 7.9 lb (3,600 g) in winter to 8.4 lb (3,800 g) in spring and males from averaging 7.5 lb (3,400 g) in winter to 6.8 lb (3,100 g) in spring. At the northernmost extremity of its range, it can be almost twice as large as in the middle of its range. In Saskatchewan, rare specimens have been recorded over 20 lb (9 kg). It has distinctive large black-tipped grey ears that are chestnut brown and white on the inner surface, and the long, powerful hind legs characteristic of hares. The back, flanks and limbs are dark brown or greyish-brown and the underparts are pale grey. The ear, from the notch, measures from 3.9 to 4.4 in (10 to 11.3 cm) and the hindfoot measures 5.7 to 6.5 in (14.5 to 16.5 cm). The tail is white with a dark central stripe above. Females are slightly larger than males. In northern populations, this hare moults in the autumn and becomes white all over except for its ears. They generally make no sound, but will emit a shrill scream if they are injured or caught.

== Distribution and habitat ==
The white-tailed jackrabbit is native to western and central parts of North America. Its range includes British Columbia, Alberta, Saskatchewan, Manitoba and Ontario in Canada and Washington, Oregon, California, Nevada, Utah, Idaho, Montana, Wyoming, Colorado, New Mexico, North Dakota, South Dakota, Nebraska, Kansas, Minnesota, Wisconsin, Iowa, Missouri and Illinois in the United States. It is found in plains and prairie and in alpine meadows with scattered coniferous trees up to an elevation of about 3,000 m (10,000 ft) in Colorado. The white-tailed jackrabbit is slightly larger than the black-tailed jackrabbit (Lepus californicus) and where their ranges overlap, they are segregated by their habitat, as the former tends to live in higher altitudes and the latter in more arid lowland habitats.

Whitetails are often seen in urban parks and on suburban parks in Western Canada. People often come across bunnies alone during the day in spring and mistakenly assume they are abandoned by their mothers. The Edmonton Humane Society has issued public statements asking that bunnies not be brought into animal shelters.

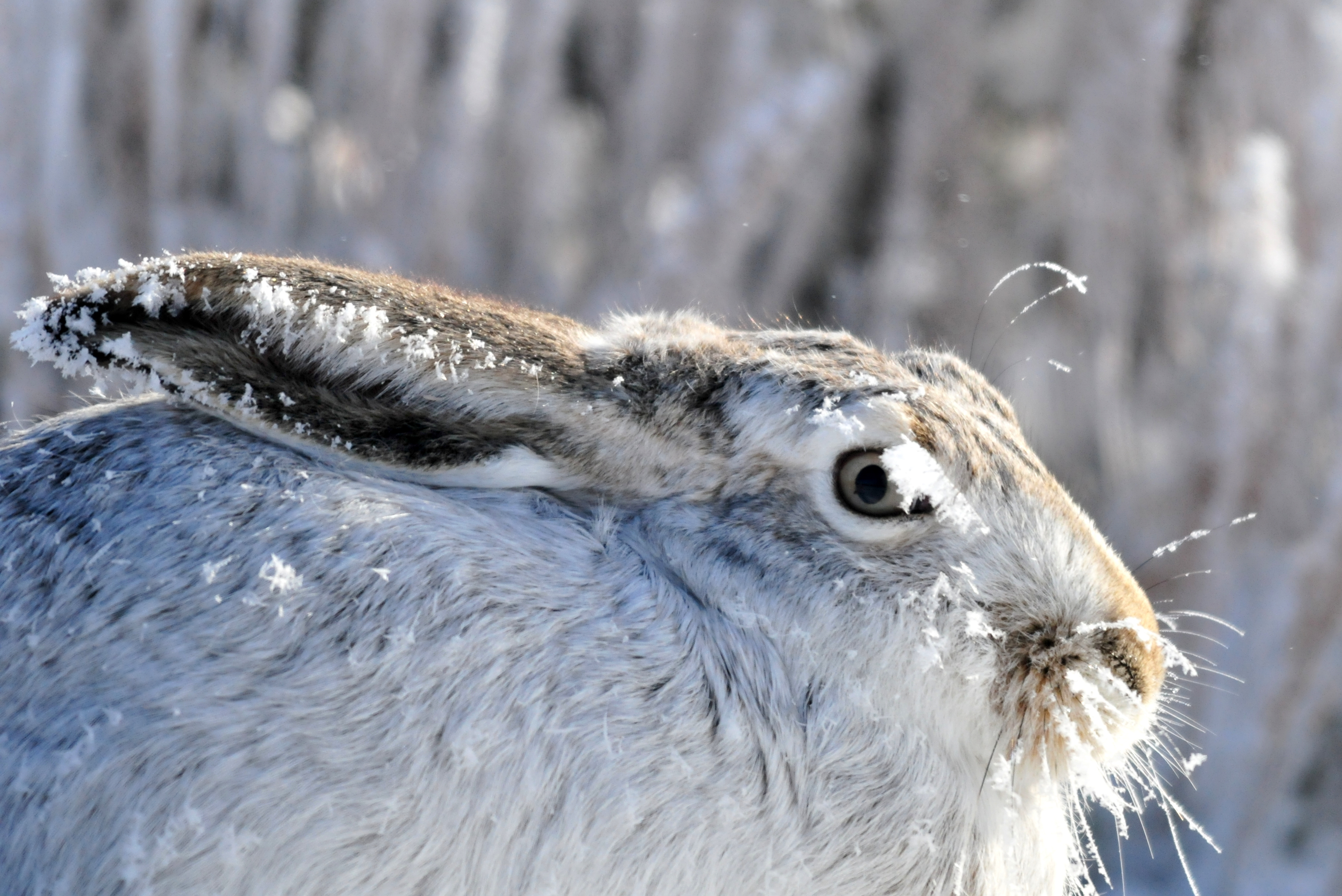
White-tailed jackrabbit in the snow at Seedskadee National Wildlife Refuge (Wyoming)

== Behaviour ==
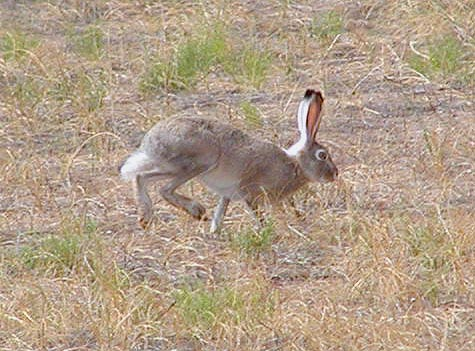
Running in Great Sand Dunes National Park

The white-tailed jackrabbit is nocturnal and lies up during the day in a form, a shallow depression in the ground hidden under vegetation, emerging at dusk to feed. The forms of this species range from 46 to 61 cm (18 to 24 in) long, 20 to 30 cm (7.9 to 11.8 in) wide, and up to 20 cm (7.9 in) deep. Often, discernible paths lead away from the form and others among the plants at often-visited feeding sites. In winter snow, the forms are interconnecting, cave-like structures. This jackrabbit is a solitary species and feeds on grasses and other green plants, including cultivated crops. In southern Colorado, from summer through fall into winter, the diet varied from 70% (summer) to 4% (winter) forbs, 43% (fall) to 4% (winter) grasses and 76% (winter) to 7% (summer) scrubs. During the winter its diet includes buds, twigs and bark from low shrubs. It tends to be more selective in its feeding habits than the black-tailed jackrabbit, which puts the white-tailed at a disadvantage where their ranges overlap. It has good eyesight, excellent hearing, and sensitive whiskers, and is probably able to detect olfactory clues as to whether another jackrabbit is ready to breed.

The breeding season is variable and depends upon latitude and environmental factors; it extends from February to July in different parts of the range. Several males may compete aggressively for the attention of a female by charging at each other, leaping, and jostling. Ovulation by the female takes place after copulation. The gestation period is about 42 days and in preparation for the birth, the female prepares a fur-lined nest under dense vegetation. A litter consists of up to 11 young, although four or five is a more typical number. The leverets weigh about 100 g (3.5 oz). They have their eyes open and are fully furred at birth and soon begin to move around. They start to forage around two weeks old and are weaned at four weeks. They are sexually mature around seven months old, but do not breed until the year after their birth.

== Ecology ==
White-tailed jackrabbits influence the composition of the turf through their selective grazing activities. They are important prey species for various mammalian predators. Red (Vulpes vulpes) and grey foxes (Urocyon cinereoargenteus) occasionally capture one, though not many large adults. They are perhaps most important prey for mid-sized carnivores such as the American badger (Taxidea taxus), the coyote (Canis latrans), and the bobcat (Lynx rufus) and small supplemental prey for larger ones such as the mountain lion (Puma concolor) and the gray wolf (Canis lupus). Snakes sometimes attack them (usually young ones) and bird predators include eagles, hawks, and owls. Golden eagles (Aquila chrysaetos) and bald eagles (Haliaeetus leucocephalus) are the only avian predators large enough to regularly take full-grown white-tailed jackrabbits, though ferruginous hawks (Buteo regalis) and great horned owls (Bubo virginianus) may occasionally take an adult, though these latter two species and other largish raptorial birds typically attack young. They attempt to evade detection by crouching in the vegetation where their cryptic colouration makes them difficult to observe. They may slink away, but if detected, they bound away at speed, adopting a zigzag course. They can run up to 55 km/h (34 mi/hr) and leap up to 5 m (16 ft). They are also hunted and eaten by humans.

== Status ==
The white-tailed jackrabbit is assessed as being of "Least Concern" by the IUCN in its Red List of Threatened Species because it has an extensive range and is fairly common across most of its range. The population size may be declining slightly, but not at a rate that would justify listing this hare in a more threatened category.

In Wyoming, however, it has become scarce in Grand Teton National Park, where it has not been seen recently. Briefly reputed to have been extirpated in Yellowstone National Park, where it was at one time abundant, it is now clear from observations, roadkilled specimens, and historical records that white-tailed jackrabbits are still present in the park. The causes of the decline in populations in Wyoming is unclear.
