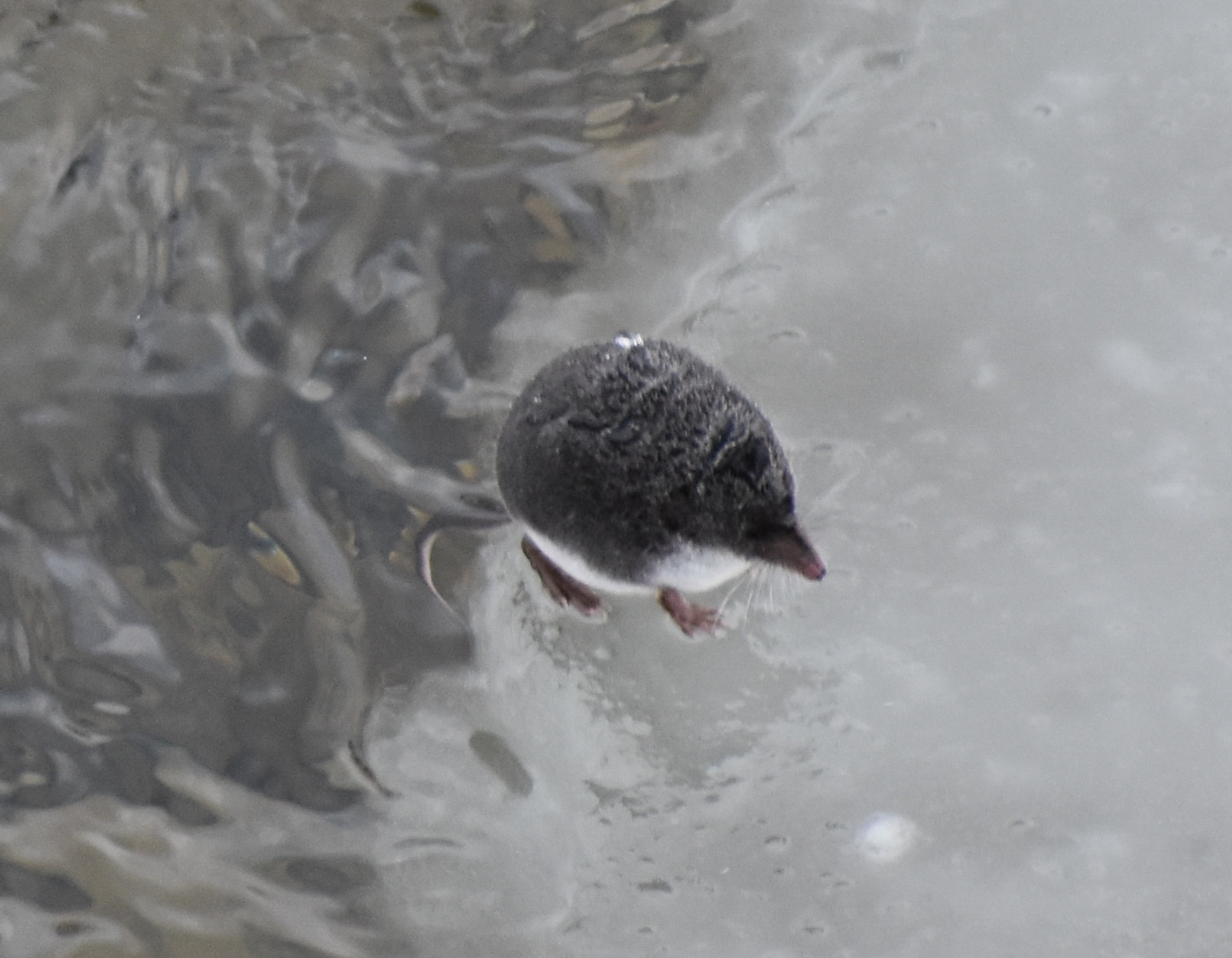
- An American water shrew on the ice of Pebble Creek

Conservation status
- Least Concern (IUCN 3.1)

Scientific classification
- Kingdom: Animalia
- Phylum: Chordata
- Class: Mammalia
- Infraclass: Placentalia
- Order: Eulipotyphla
- Family: Soricidae
- Genus: Sorex
- Species: S. palustris

Binomial name
- Sorex palustris Richardson, 1828
- Distribution of the American water shrew in Northern America

= American water shrew =

Species of mammal

The American water shrew or northern water shrew (Sorex palustris) is a shrew found in the nearctic faunal region located throughout the mountain ranges of the northern United States and in Canada and Alaska. The animal resides in semi-aquatic habitats, and is known for being the smallest mammalian diver.

== Anatomy and morphology ==
The American water shrew is a sexually dimorphic species in which the males are generally larger and heavier than the females. The size of the shrew is 130–170 mm (5.1–6.7 in) and weight is 8–18 g (0.28–0.63 oz). Their tail length is 57–89 mm (2.2–3.5 in). The shrew exhibits a black and brown pelage which varies in shade depending on the season. When underwater, the animal appears to have a silver veneer on account of its water repellent fur trapping air bubbles. The snout features vibrissae which in the case of water shrews are specialized for aquatic hunting. Like other small mammals who spend part of their time in water, American water shrews have short hairs covering their hind limbs to bolster each paddle with increased surface area, an adaptation not dissimilar to flippers. Externally the American water shrew is indistinguishable from the western water shrew, a genetically distinct species whose morphology differs from the American water shrew strictly over subtle cranial and dental aspects. The American water shrew has a large skull ranging from 21–23 mm (0.83–0.91 in) and width 10–11 mm (0.39–0.43 in) and has a dental formula of 1.5.1.31.1.1.3 × 2 = 32 teeth.

== Distribution and habitat ==
American water shrew populations span the central and eastern regions of Canada and the northern United States, as well as a small isolated section of the Appalachian mountain range. A separate distribution of the population can be found in the western United States and Canada. Because much of the range water shrews occupy today was historically a landscape of continental ice sheets, they considerably expanded their range in the time since the Last Glacial Maximum.

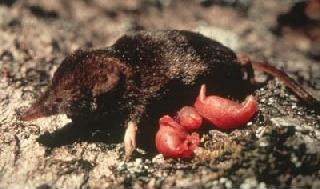
American water shrew with newborn young.

American water shrews prefer to inhabit streams of higher inclines, although they have been observed in a variety of water bodies including more gently sloping streams, springs, mud flats, and even beaver dens. Hence their name, they are rarely found far from water since their diet consists almost entirely of small aquatic invertebrates and fishes.

== Behavior ==
Shrews are known to hunt land prey depending on the ease of the attack, but mainly target aquatic prey by diving from rocks or elevated banks of streams, making them the smallest of the mammalian divers. Most remarkable about this behavior is that water shrews are mainly nocturnal hunters, meaning they don't use eyesight while locating their prey underwater. While it has been suggested that water shrews may use sonar or electroreception for this purpose, all investigations into these claims have produced no supporting evidence. According to Kenneth C. Catania's research, nocturnally diving shrews manage to locate their prey in the obscured stream by detecting movement along their whiskers or by "underwater sniffing," a strategy in which they exhale air bubbles onto a perceived target and then re-inhale their own air bubbles to confirm the presence of prey.

Unlike most species of shrews which breed later in the year, American water shrews have been found to breed between the months of February and August based on analysis of wild specimen whose ovarian and testicular activity was at a height during these months. Females usually have a three-week gestation period, and offspring are born in the spring and summer. They usually produce two to three litters during that time. These litters can contain three to 10 offspring.

== Subspecies ==
The American water shrew has nine subspecies:

- S. p. albibarbis
- S. p. brooksi
- S. p. gloveralleni
- S. p. hydrobadistes
- S. p. labradorensis
- S. p. navigator
- S. p. palustris
- S. p. punctulatus
- S. p. turneri
