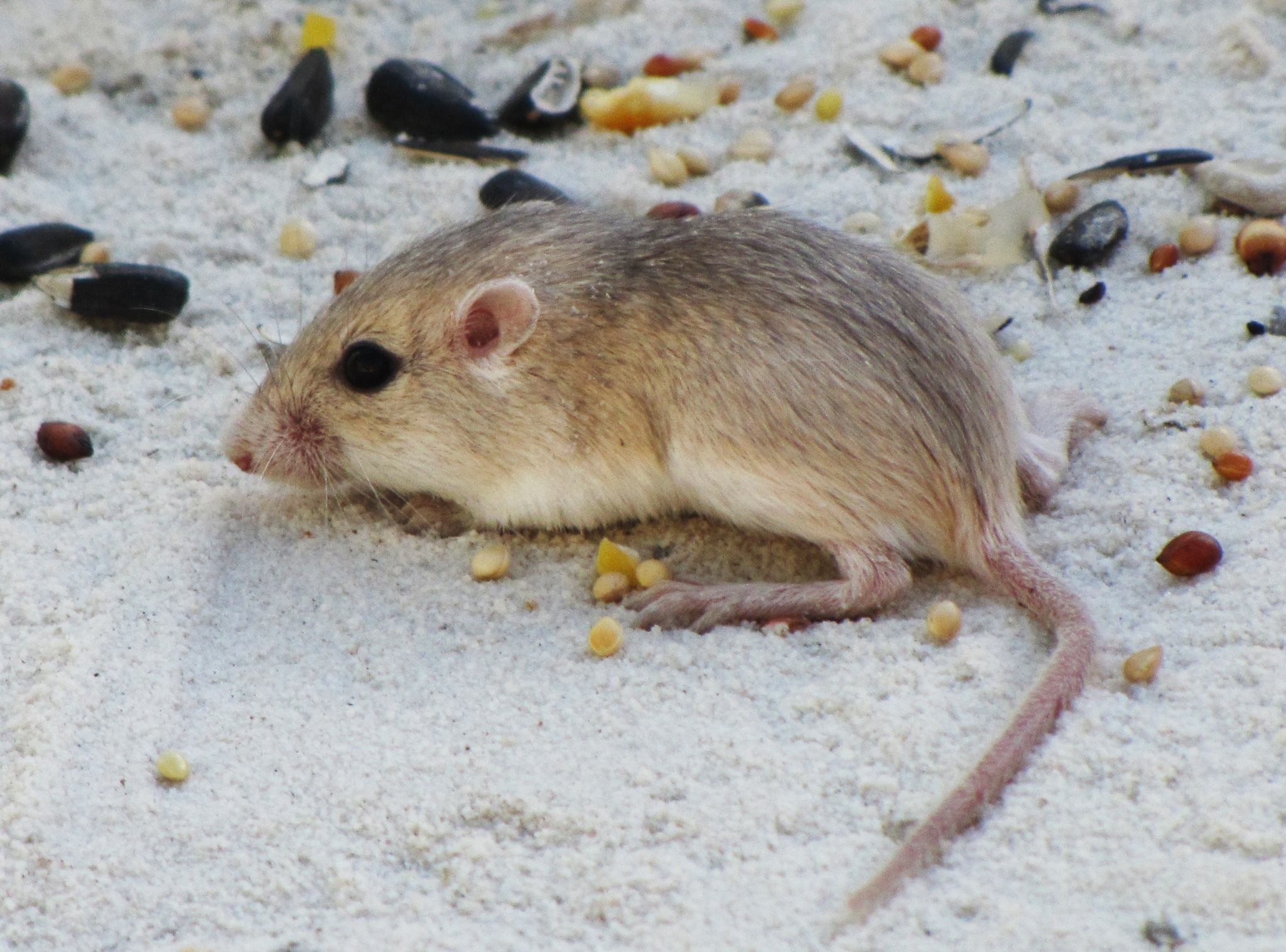
- Perognathus flavescens apache

Conservation status
- Least Concern (IUCN 3.1)

Scientific classification
- Kingdom: Animalia
- Phylum: Chordata
- Class: Mammalia
- Order: Rodentia
- Family: Heteromyidae
- Genus: Perognathus
- Species: P. flavescens

Binomial name
- Perognathus flavescens Merriam, 1889

= Plains pocket mouse =

Species of rodent

The plains pocket mouse (Perognathus flavescens) is a heteromyid rodent of North America. It ranges from southwestern Minnesota and southeastern North Dakota to northern Texas east of the Rockies, and from northern Utah and Colorado to northern Chihuahua west of the Rockies.

It has soft silky fur and grows to be 5 inches (13 cm) long, although nearly half of that is the tail.

They often live directly underneath Spanish bayonet or prickly pear plants. They are accustomed to sandy soil and eat mostly seeds, large and small grasses and small leaves of plants. Some food found in their cheek pouches are: seeds of needle grass (Stipa), bind weed, sandbur grass, a small bean (probably Astragalus), and sedge (Cyperus). Even those caught in grain fields usually have their pouches filled with weed seeds. Seeds of two species of pigeon grass, a few other grasses, and wild buckwheat have been found in their burrows.

Their breeding season is mainly July to August and the females tend to have 4 embryos at a time. Other information about this animal is scarce.

Media related to Perognathus flavescens at Wikimedia Commons
