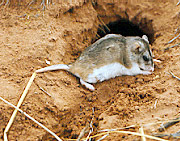

Conservation status
- Least Concern (IUCN 3.1)

Scientific classification
- Kingdom: Animalia
- Phylum: Chordata
- Class: Mammalia
- Order: Rodentia
- Family: Cricetidae
- Subfamily: Neotominae
- Genus: Onychomys
- Species: O. leucogaster

Binomial name
- Onychomys leucogaster (Wied-Neuwied, 1841)

= Northern grasshopper mouse =

Species of rodent

The northern grasshopper mouse (Onychomys leucogaster) is a North American carnivorous rodent of the family Cricetidae. It ranges over much of the western part of the continent, from southern Saskatchewan and central Washington to Tamaulipas in northeast Mexico.

== Description ==
The northern grasshopper mouse is found in North America, primarily in dry areas. They are stocky: on average they are 164 mm (6.5 in) long and about 35 g (0.077 lb) in weight. The tail is often less than 30% of the total body length, whereas other mice tend to have longer tails. It has two main color phases: grayish (or black in northeastern bits of its range) and cinnamon with white below. Unlike most rodents, this one has a mostly carnivorous diet mainly consisting of small insects, other mice, and even snakes; no more than a quarter of its diet is plant-based. Vegetation is consumed in greatest amounts around midwinter. This rodent is also nocturnal and especially active on moonless or cloudy nights. Throughout the night, the grasshopper mouse makes high-pitched noises, performed with a raised nose and opened mouth to claim its territory. It's preyed on primarily by hawks, owls, coyotes, and snakes.

== Habitat ==
This grasshopper mouse can be found in prairies with low grass, dry areas, and also pasture lands of the central and southwestern parts of the United States. O. leucogaster has been known to associate positively with black-tailed prairie dogs, possibly due to their preference for disturbed areas, suitable habitat in the form of burrows, or food supply. The northern grasshopper mouse lives in burrows underground, by either digging its own or inhabiting burrows that have been disowned. These mice have a system of multiple burrows, each one serving a different function. The nest burrow is the primary area of activity during the day. To keep moisture in during the day, they close up the opening. A retreat burrow serves as a quick escape from predators. Its design is about 10 inches into the ground at a 45° angle. The cache burrow is used for storing seeds. The signpost burrows are small and filled with glandular secretions that mark the boundaries of their territory. All of these burrows are found within a large area of territory.

== Reproduction ==
The northern grasshopper mouse has about two or three litters a year consisting of two to seven young, with the average being four. They have a gestation of 32–47 days, and the young are born in either late fall or early winter, between September and February. The male gathers and provides food for the female while she is pregnant and taking care of her young. The northern grasshopper mouse is an altricial species; baby mice are naked with closed eyes when they are born, and weigh about three grams. Both sexes reach their sexual maturity at three months, but the lifespan of a typical mouse living in the wild is only a few weeks to a few months.

== Diseases ==
Susceptibility studies on grasshopper mice from areas with plague and from those areas that have been historically free of plague by Thomas et al. (1988) showed the animals from areas with a history of plague were more resistant to the plague bacterium Yersinia pestis than the animals from a historically plague-free area, hence they were considered to be a potential alternate host for plague. Grasshopper mice have also been shown to harbor 57 species of fleas, many of which are vectors of plague. Given the abundance and diversity of fleas on the grasshopper mouse and their use of prairie dog burrows and interaction with other rodent species, they are considered to be important for the maintenance and transmission of plague in the prairie dog ecosystem. They are also found frequently infected with another hemotropic intracellular pathogen Bartonella and Ying et al. 2007 showed that they can acquire different strains of Bartonella from multiple rodent species.
