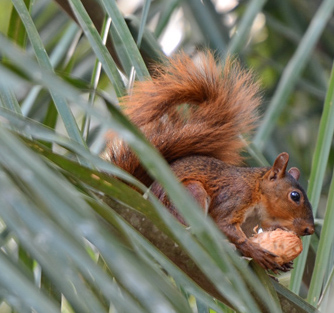

Conservation status
- Least Concern (IUCN 3.1)

Scientific classification
- Kingdom: Animalia
- Phylum: Chordata
- Class: Mammalia
- Order: Rodentia
- Family: Sciuridae
- Genus: Sciurus
- Species: S. spadiceus

Binomial name
- Sciurus spadiceus Olfers, 1818

Subspecies
- Sciurus spadiceus spadiceus; Sciurus spadiceus steinbachi; Sciurus spadiceus tricolor

= Southern Amazon red squirrel =

Species of rodent

The southern Amazon red squirrel (Sciurus spadiceus), is a squirrel species from South America where it inhabits forests in much of north-western South America east of the Andes. Three subspecies are currently recognised. It is a dark red colour, or a dark brown grizzled with ochre, has whitish underparts and grows to a total length of 48 to 63 cm (19 to 25 in), including a very long tail. It spends much of its time on the ground in the undergrowth and feeds largely on nuts. Little is known of its breeding habits, but it is a sociable species, several individuals often feeding together in one tree. This squirrel faces no particular threats, has a wide range and is relatively common, and the International Union for Conservation of Nature lists it as a "least-concern species".

== Description ==
One of the largest species of squirrel in its range, S. spadiceus ranges from 48 to 63 cm (19 to 25 in) in total length, including a very long, 24 to 34 cm (9.4 to 13.4 in), tail. Males and females are similarly sized, and weigh between 570 and 660 g (20 and 23 oz). The fur is typically reddish-brown over most of the body, grizzled with paler yellow, but can be dark brown to near-black, especially in the S. s. tricolor subspecies. The underparts are white to pale ochre in colour, and separated from the remainder of the body by a narrow band of dark fur. The cheeks and head range from yellow to reddish-orange, and the tail fades from dark brown at the base to orange along most of its length.

The southern Amazon species differs from the otherwise very similar northern Amazon red squirrel in having a longer and narrower head, and orange fur behind its ears and on the tops of its feet. Females have eight teats.

== Distribution and habitat ==
The southern Amazon red squirrel inhabits north-western South America east of the Andes. It is found from southern Colombia and western Ecuador, through eastern Peru, northern Bolivia, and Brazil south of the Amazon River. Most inhabit lowland rain forests, although in the western parts of their range some live in forested highlands in the foothills of the Andes.

Three subspecies are currently recognised, although the precise geographic boundaries between their ranges are not yet clear:

- Sciurus spadiceus spadiceus - mostly in Brazil
- Sciurus spadiceus steinbachi - mostly in Bolivia
- Sciurus spadiceus tricolor - mostly in Peru

== Biology and behaviour ==
Southern Amazon red squirrels spend much of their life on the ground, or among heavy undergrowth, but can readily climb trees and retreat to the forest canopy during the heavy floods of the wet season. They are common animals within their range, with population densities of 3.8 to 6.6 per square kilometre (9.8 to 17.1/sq mi) having been reported; individual home ranges vary from 25 to 50 hectares (62 to 124 acres). They are diurnal herbivores, feeding primarily on large, hard-shelled nuts, such as those of murumuru, Attalea, and Dipteryx. Known predators include ocelots and jaguars.

The squirrels are non-territorial, with several individuals often feeding from the same tree. They cache nuts on the ground, and generally descend to ground level when alarmed, rather than jumping between branches. They have been reported to make alarm calls that sound like a sneeze followed by a chattering noise. Although most details of their reproduction are unclear, females are said to give birth to litters of two to four pups.
