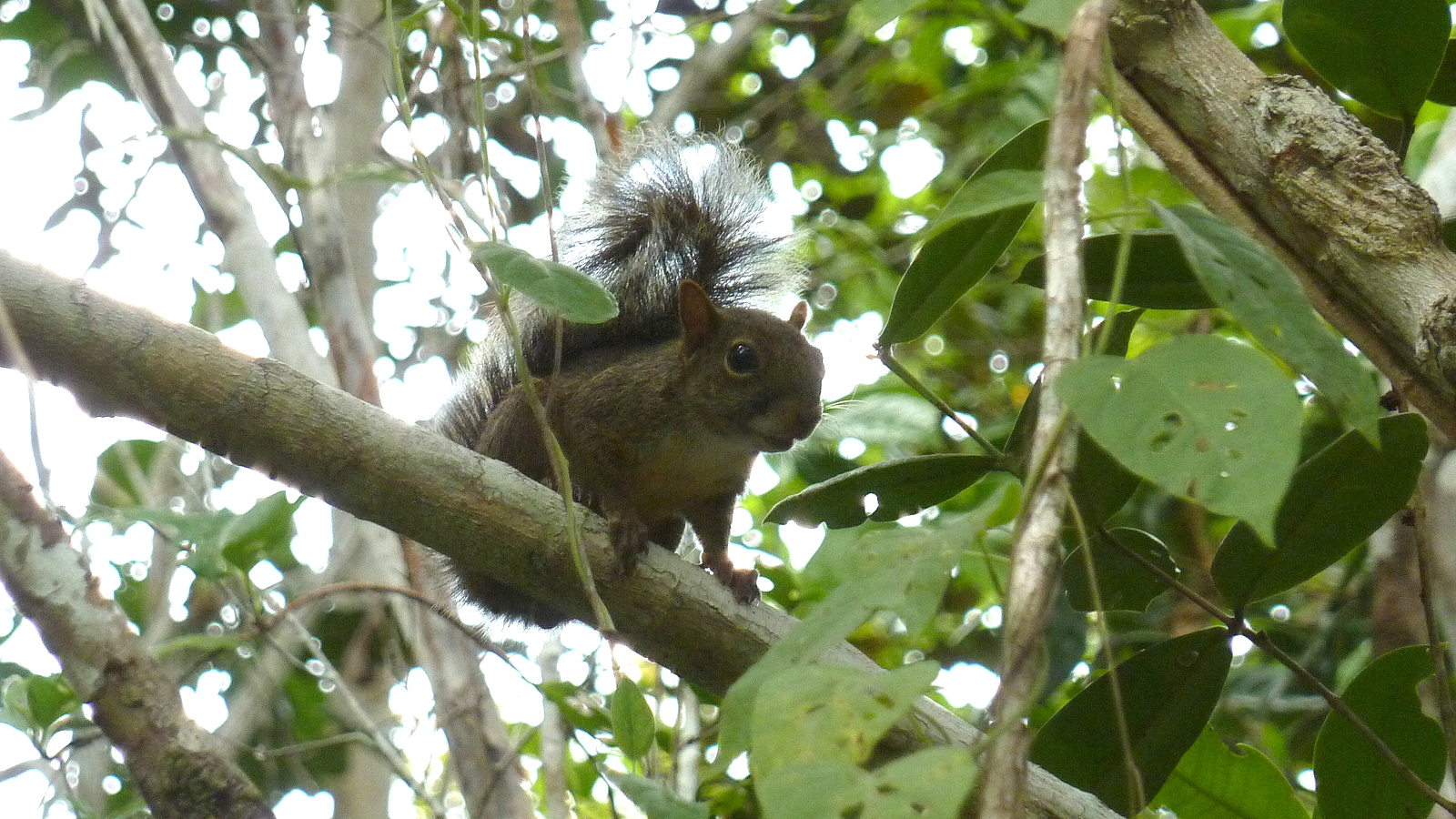

Scientific classification
- Kingdom: Animalia
- Phylum: Chordata
- Class: Mammalia
- Order: Rodentia
- Family: Sciuridae
- Genus: Sciurus
- Species: S. ingrami

Binomial name
- Sciurus ingrami Thomas, 1901

= Sciurus ingrami =

Ingram's squirrel

Species of rodent

Sciurus ingrami, usually called Ingram's squirrel in English, is a squirrel found in South America. It is known as serelepe in southeastern Brazil. It is found in the Atlantic Forest Biome of Brazil and Misiones Province, Argentina.

It is regarded variously as a species, or as a subspecies of the Brazilian Squirrel Sciurus aestuans or Sciurus (Guerlinguetus) brasiliensis.

It is solitary and territorial, but has been seen to act together and mob a predatory cat, the margay.

== Diet ==
In the moist highland forests of Araucaria angustifolia on the Misiones plateau and surrounding areas this squirrel subsists mostly on the nuts of Syagrus romanzoffiana.

In a secondary Araucaria angustifolia forest in the Parque Recreativo Primavera in the vicinity of the city of Curitiba, Paraná, 1400 hours in a single year's time was spent observing the feeding behaviour of this squirrel. Although it fed on ten plant species, it obtained most of its diet from the nuts of Syagrus romanzoffiana (queen palm) throughout the year, but it punctuated this with peaks of feeding on the seeds of Araucaria angustifolia in the fall and winter, and acorns of the non-native Quercus robur (English oak, as Q. pedunculata in the study) in the summer. Mushrooms were also important in the winter and spring. Other introduced plant species were lesser but substantial food items, as such the seeds of Pinus taeda (loblolly pine) in the winter and the nuts of Castanea sativa (chestnut) in the spring and summer were quite often consumed. Other minor but regular plants were the nuts of the native Butia eriospatha (woolly jelly palm) in the spring and summer, pips of the non-native Eriobotrya japonica (loquat) in the winter, the native Eugenia uniflora in the spring and summer, and the native Rhamnus sphaerosperma in the summer and fall, as well as flowers and tree bark. Symplocos uniflora was a rare food item in the summer.
