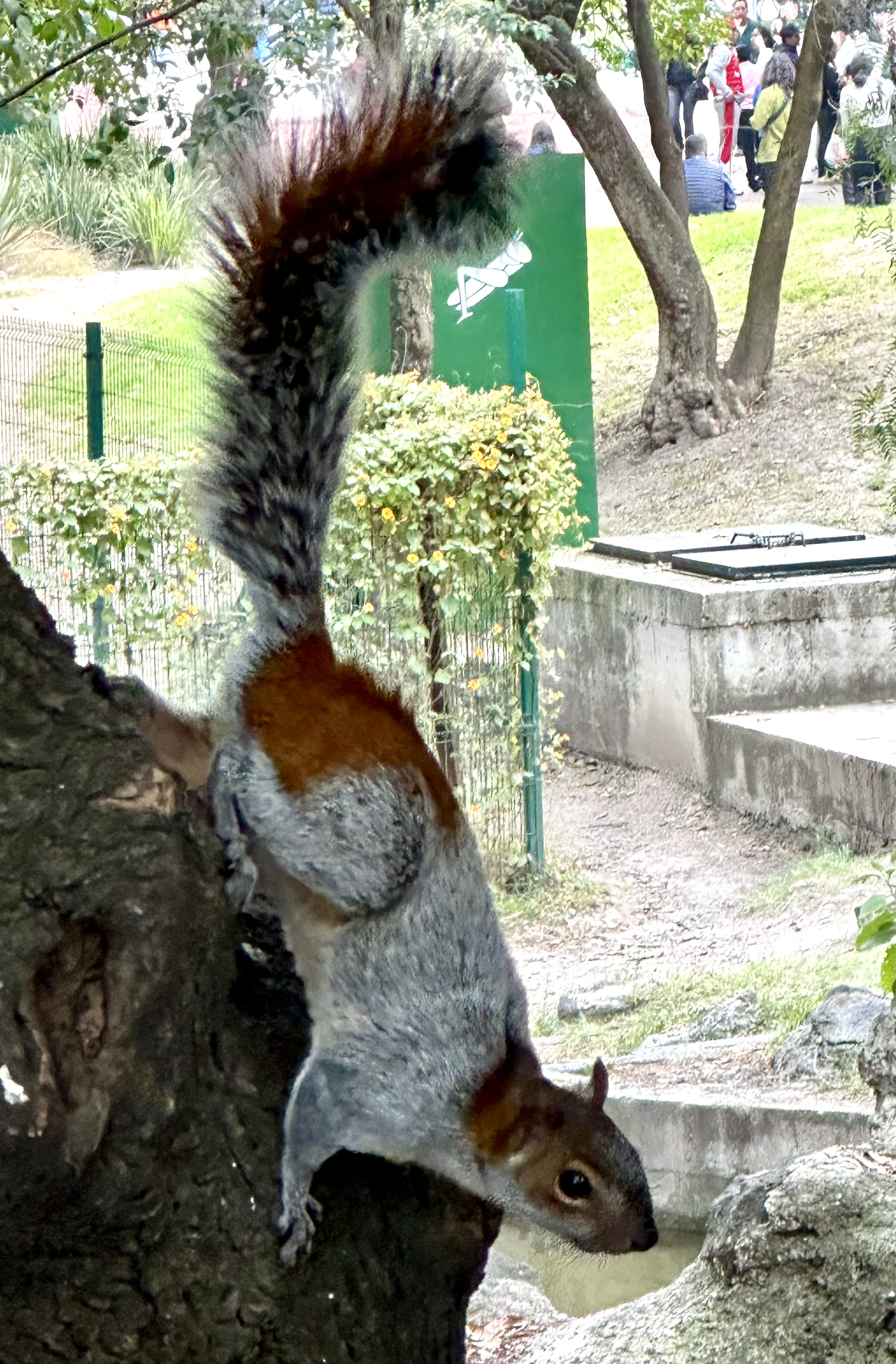

Conservation status
- Least Concern (IUCN 3.1)

- Secure (NatureServe)

Scientific classification
- Kingdom: Animalia
- Phylum: Chordata
- Class: Mammalia
- Infraclass: Placentalia
- Order: Rodentia
- Family: Sciuridae
- Genus: Sciurus
- Species: S. aureogaster

Binomial name
- Sciurus aureogaster F. Cuvier, 1829

Subspecies
- S. a. aureogaster; S. a. nigrescens
- Mexican gray squirrel range

= Mexican gray squirrel =

Species of rodent

The Mexican gray squirrel (Sciurus aureogaster, F. Cuvier), also known as the red-bellied squirrel, is known in Spanish as ardilla gris mexicana or ardilla vientre rojo. The species consists of two subspecies S. a. aureogaster and S.a. nigrescens, which are native to Mexico and Southern Guatemala. The Mexican gray squirrel was introduced to the Florida Keys in 1938 and is considered an invasive species.

== Taxonomy ==
Sciurus aureogaster was named in 1829 by Frédéric Cuvier. It is classified as part of the subgenus Sciurus within the broader Sciurus genus of tree squirrels, alongside several other North American and Eurasian species.

Due to the species' considerable variety in fur color and patterns across its range, over sixty distinct scientific names have been applied to specimens since its original naming. Consequently, while the possibility that additional subspecies might be present within the species has been raised by taxonomists such as Guy Musser, at present only two subspecies are universally recognized:

- S. a. aureogaster: Occurs in eastern Mexico. Typically has orange to chestnut ventral fur, small postauricular patches, and a white tail accented with black or chestnut.
- S. a. nigrescens: Occurs in the Pacific coast of Mexico. Typically has white to chestnut ventral fur, patchy dorsal fur, large postauricular patches, and a gray to chestnut tail.

A 2020 paper published on the taxonomy of Sciurinae, which proposed a split of Sciurus into multiple genera, grouped the Mexican gray squirrel alongside four other Central American taxa, Collie's squirrel, Deppe's squirrel, the variegated squirrel, and the Yucatan squirrel, within the resurrected genus Echinosciurus. The genus had originally been created for the binomial name Echinosciurus hypopyrrhus, one of the junior synonyms for S. aureogaster.

== Description ==
Mexican gray squirrels have considerable individual and geographic variance in fur color and pattern. In general, their dorsal fur is pale to gray, but frequently marked with patches of other colors on the neck, shoulders, back, and sides. Belly fur ranges through white, orange, and chestnut. The tail tends to have the same colors as the belly. Partial and complete melanism is common.

In Mexico, the Mexican gray squirrel typically has a light to dark gray dorsal side and a ventral side ranging from white, to orange, to a deep chestnut color. However, in northern native populations, it is common for individuals to have all black or gray dorsal fur with a slight coloration of red on the belly and rump. In Elliott Key, the common phenotype is entirely black fur.

== Ecology and behavior ==
The Mexican gray squirrel is an arboreal species, spending most of its time in trees, including the trees where it nests. They are also most active during the daytime after sunrise and before sunset. They are very agile creatures that can make long jumps from tree to tree with extreme precision. They spend the majority of their time at heights of 10–20 metres (33–66 ft) above ground level, but will forage at higher and lower heights, including on the ground. They frequently feed while hanging from a branch by their hind limbs.

Mexican gray squirrels are typically silent except when frightened or mating. In these contexts, they make four distinct calls: a low-pitched bark made in response to a distant threat, a high-pitched bark made in response to a nearby threat, a high-pitched squeal made when grabbed or handled directly, and a series of rapid squeals and clicks made during mating chases

Mexican gray squirrels are mostly solitary, and are typically only encountered in groups when attracted by abundant food. They are not however territorial, and their ranges typically overlap.

These squirrels are extremely shy toward humans. In the introduced population on Elliott Key, Florida, they typically remain in trees except when foraging or reproducing. Chasing behavior has been observed in this species and is thought to be associated with mating, with multiple squirrels chasing a single individual while producing squeaking and clicking sounds.

=== Diet ===
Mexican gray squirrels feed primarily on acorns, with other seeds, fruits, fungi, insects, and nestlings rounding out their diet. In lowland environments they typically feed on fruit and seeds, including acorns, pine seeds, and dogwood seeds. In highland habitats, they feed on acorns and pinecones. Squirrels in all terrains, depending on the season, eat fruit including mangos, figs, plums, tamarind pods, chico zapote, and corn. Wild mastic, papaya, coconut, sea grape, thatch palm, blackbead, and poisonwood berries are also a common part of the squirrel's diet. While these berries, seeds, and fruits are not available in the winter or spring months, the squirrels find buds and twigs of mahogany, gumbo limbo, and sea grape. During food scarcity, squirrels can clip branches and eat the phloem, or the inner bark of the wild mastic. Near farms or urban areas, the squirrels feast on corn, crops, and plants available to them.

The introduced population in Florida originally fed on seeds and fruits from wild mastic (Sideroxylon foetidissimum), papaya (Carica papaya), seagrape (Coccoloba uvifera), thatch palm (Thrinax parviflora), coconut (Cocos nucifera), and Australian pine (Casuarina equisetifolia). Beginning in the 1980s, nonative species such as the papaya, coconut, and Australian pine were removed from the island, which caused the squirrels to refocus their diet on the remaining native species.

=== Ecosystem role and predators ===
In Mexico, the Mexican gray squirrel is preyed upon by bobcats, as well as by humans for human consumption. For this reason, they use their fur for camouflage. In the Florida Keys, there is little predation pressure, as they have no natural predators in introduced areas. Instead, they compete with other native species such as rodents, birds, and fox squirrels for food and denning sites.

The primary predators of Mexican gray squirrels are birds of prey, felids, procyonids, and snakes.

=== Nesting ===
Mexican gray squirrels create nests approximately 5 to 15 meters (16 to 49 ft) above the ground, consisting of a "cup" of interwoven twigs containing a bedding of densely packed leaves and covered by a dome of interwoven leaves and twigs. The coverings over the top of their nests keep them out of sight of predators and keeps them protected from harsh weather. By 1938 in Elliot Key, Florida, the squirrels adapted to the urban and dense subtropical areas. In Florida, they build nests very similar to their relatives in Mexico and Guatemala. On Elliott Key, they have been documented forming leaf nests in twelve species of trees, with 60% of the nests being in Swietenia mahagoni.

=== Reproduction ===
The mating season for the Mexican gray squirrel is year-round, with birthing occurring during the dry season. Females, or does, carry 2–4 kits (also called pups or kittens) at a time. However, it is more common for those in the Florida Keys to have an average of 1–2 kits per litter, with food availability being the limiting factor for reproduction. There has been little research done on the mating behaviors of these squirrels; however it is known that they are polygynandrous. This means that males will reproduce with many females, and females will mate with many different males.

== Distribution and habitat ==
Mexican gray squirrels are found in the western coastal plain of Mexico between the states of Colima and Chiapas, in the eastern coastal plain from Nuevo León and Tamaulipas to Tabasco, and in the southern part the Mexican Plateau. South of this, their range extends into highland areas in central and southwestern Guatemala.

Mexican gray squirrels inhabit a range of forested biomes in Mexico and Guatemala. These squirrels are found in a wide variety of habitats, including evergreen forests, woodland filled with dry pine-oak, thorn scrub, secondary forests, and plantations. In lowland areas they occupy tropical scrub and broadleaf forests, and transition to oak and pine cloud forests at higher elevations. They also frequent the edges of cultivated and urban areas. Geographically, Mexican gray squirrels range from sea level to elevations of 3,300 to 3,800 meters (10,800 to 12,500 ft).

== Introductions and impact ==
In its native range, the Mexican gray squirrel is considered to be a pest to cornfields and to cacao, papaya, mango, and coconut plantations. They are also hunted in parts of their range for their meat and pelts, and occasionally sold as pets due to their bright colors.

=== As an invasive species ===
The squirrels were introduced to Elliott Key, Florida, in 1938 by the early island owner J. Arthur Pancoast. He released two pairs of squirrels from Eastern Mexico to Elliot Key, which resembles the native habitats in many ways. By 1950, these squirrels inhabited most of the island. The introduced population survived a storm surge caused by Hurricane Andrew in 1992, which covered the island under six meters of water. During this time the species also spread to nearby islands, including Sands Key and Old Rhodes Key.

One of the biggest concerns of the introduction of the Mexican gray squirrel is the competition with other species for food and resources. There is little predation pressure on the population, but competition for food and denning sites by black rats, raccoons, frugivorous birds, owls, and other species seems to be the primary limiting factor on the island's squirrel density. They compete with these species for space and places to nest. They compete with the threatened white-crowned pigeons, which depend upon the same food sources as the squirrels, such as Florida poison berries and pigeon plum berries.

The introduction of the Mexican gray squirrel has been linked to the reduction of native food sources or species. More specifically, the introduction of these squirrels has reduced and damaged the number of trees and native species present as a result of their predation or need for resources. The squirrels nest in different species of trees, such as Mahogany, Pigeon Plum, and Sargent Plum trees. They use resources such as mahogany leaves and twigs, pigeon plum leaves, Casuarina needles, palm fibers, milkbark, and sargent palm leaves to build their nests. In the Florida Keys, the squirrels are damaging many tree populations by gnawing on them and using them as the sources for nesting, including pigeon plum, wild mastic, poisonwood, and catclaw trees. The trees they nest in, as well as get their resources to build their nests from, are decreasing as a result of the damage the squirrels are causing. The damage they are causing to the trees is disrupting the community and ecosystem. The squirrels also consume Florida tree snails, which is a species of high concern within the state. There is a potential that the number and dispersal of white oak trees can decrease in response to the Mexican gray squirrels predation on its acorns.

Within Biscayne National Park, located in the Florida Keys, the Mexican gray squirrel appears to be a major threat to the park's flora and fauna. The endangered Sargent's palm and state-threatened thatch palms are of primary concern. The squirrels have been observed using the thatch palm for food and nesting material, causing major damage to the tree, often resulting in its death. Further, the spread of the squirrel could result in competition with the federally endangered Key Largo woodrat and cotton mouse, the state-threatened Big Cypress fox squirrel and the gray squirrel. The Mexican gray squirrel could also negatively impact tropical fruit production if populations spread to South Florida.

Hurricane Andrew of 1992 was believed to naturally eliminate a portion of the population in the Florida Keys islands. Yet the squirrels were still dominant in Elliot Key, Florida. To remove the squirrels, the National Park Service of Biscayne National Park made an effort to remove all non-native plants in the 1990's. As these were a significant food source for the squirrels, this was hoped to reduce their numbers. However, the squirrels responded by shifting to native species for food. In 2008, efforts shifted to the direct removal of the squirrels from the Florida Keys. Successful removal tactics include shooting and removal of leaf nests at night. The Mexican gray squirrel's nests were marked with reflective tape to then be removed later on at night. A non-toxic shot from a shotgun was released into the nest, killing the squirrels which were then removed. A total of 1,410 nests and 33 individual squirrels were removed from the affected islands. Eradication efforts from the Biscayne National Park will continue until the species is completely removed from the area.
