= Gray squirrel =

Gray squirrel or grey squirrel may refer to several species of squirrel indigenous to North America:

- The eastern gray squirrel (Sciurus carolinensis), from the eastern United States and southeastern Canada; introduced into Great Britain, Ireland, western North America, Italy, and South Africa
- The western gray squirrel (Sciurus griseus), from the western United States
- The Arizona gray squirrel (Sciurus arizonensis), from the southwestern United States and adjacent Mexico
- The Mexican gray squirrel (Sciurus aureogaster), from southern Mexico and Guatemala; introduced into the Florida Keys
