= Fiery squirrel =

Conservation status
- Data Deficient (IUCN 3.1)

Scientific classification
- Kingdom: Animalia
- Phylum: Chordata
- Class: Mammalia
- Infraclass: Placentalia
- Order: Rodentia
- Family: Sciuridae
- Genus: Sciurus
- Species: S. flammifer

Binomial name
- Sciurus flammifer Thomas, 1904
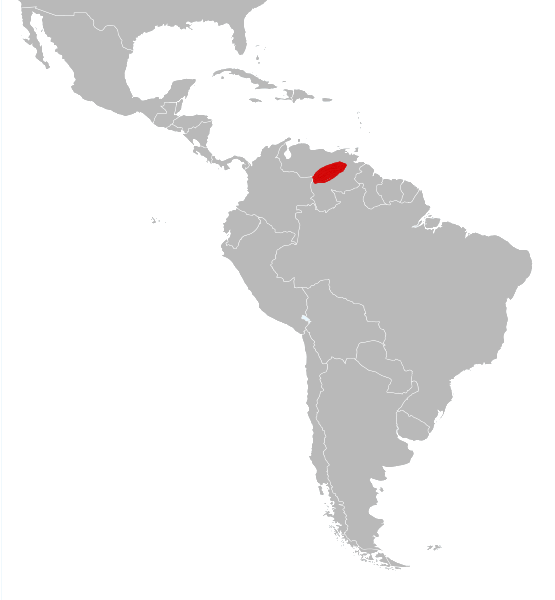
- Fiery squirrel's range

Species of rodent

The fiery squirrel (Sciurus flammifer) is a rodent in the family Sciuridae. The taxon is endemic to the area south of the Orinoco River in the state of Bolívar, Venezuela.

== Taxonomy ==
The taxon was first described as a species in 1904 by Michael Rogers Oldfield Thomas. In 1914 Joel Asaph Allen designated it as the type species for his new monotypic genus Hadrosciurus. In 1927 Oldfield Thomas subsumed Hadrosciurus to a subgenus of Sciurus. In 1928 Oldfield Thomas reduced subgenus Urosciurus into synonymy with subgenus Hadrosciurus, and moved Urosciurus pyrrhinus and U. igniventris to Hadrosciurus. In 1940 Ellerman moved the new additions to subgenus Hadrosciurus to subgenus Guerlinguetus, returning it to monotypy. In 1959 Moore raised subgenus Guerlinguetus to the rank of genus in which he included all larger South American squirrels, and moved the monotypic subgenus Hadrosciurus from genus Sciurus to Guerlinguetus, including the Urosciurus species in subgenus Hadrosciurus. Cabrera (posthumously) in 1961 used Oldfield Thomas's taxonomic interpretation. Moore was not as widely followed as Cabrera. In 2005 Thorington & Hoffmann used Urosciurus, mistakenly attributing Moore, although it was Patton who resurrected Urosciurus in 1984. Cranial studies by Hershkovitz in 1959 and especially Patton in 1984 give credence to splitting these squirrels from Sciurus.

In 2015 de Vivo & Carmignotto reduced this taxon to a subspecies of Hadrosciurus igniventris.

== Description ==
This is a large tree squirrel up to 60 cm long from head to tail. The back is black, the hairs heavily tinged with streaks of pale yellow to orange, with orange to red limbs, an orange tail, and a white abdomen. It has conspicuous pale orange patches of fur behind the ears. Complete melanism and partial albinism have been documented.

== Distribution ==
The taxon occurs in Venezuela in the state of Bolívar south of the Orinoco River. Published sources disagree regarding the precise distribution: Thorington & Hoffman state it is found south of the Orinoco from the Colombian border to Ciudad Bolívar at the confluence of the Río Caroní into the Orinoco (thus east of the Caroní), whereas de Vivo & Carmignotto give it south of the Orinoco and to the west of the Río Caroní to the Guyana border, to the Brazilian border at the Serra de Pacaraima. Both may be correct; specimens have been collected in the municipalities of Cedeño (Caura River near La Union, Mocho River, Suapure), Gran Sabana (19 Km NE Icabaru in the Pacaraima), Heres (Ciudad Bolívar), and Sucre (El Yagual).

== Habitat and behaviour ==
Fiery squirrels are found mainly in closed-canopy lowland rainforest, either primary old-growth woodland or disturbed secondary growth, in the southern part of the upper Orinoco drainage.

Fiery squirrels are highly arboreal and spend most of their time foraging high within the canopies of dense tree cover, which makes their behavior difficult to observe. The behaviour of this particular taxon is presumably similar to Hadrosciurus igniventris ssp. igniventris; diurnal, territorial and solitary, arboreal and found at all heights from canopy to ground level, building large and well-hidden spherical nests in trees, and feeding on the large nuts of Attalea palm, as well as other tree nuts, fruit, and beetle grubs.

== Similar species ==
The range is not sympatric with other large squirrels. Hadrosciurus igniventris ssp. igniventris, which occurs to the south and east of its range and is most similar to it, is distinguished by having a red abdomen and lacking conspicuous lighter-coloured patches of fur behind the ears. Hadrosciurus igniventris ssp. cocalis has a yellowish-orange abdomen and has conspicuous orange patches behind the ears.

== Conservation ==
Baillie writing in 1996 for the IUCN rated it as Lower Risk/least concern. In the latest assessment for the IUCN by Amori, Koprowski & Roth in 2008 the largely unknown taxon was given a Data Deficient rating, although they mention their concern due to its restricted range and the effects of deforestation.
