= Crotalus durissus neoleonensis =

Crotalus durissus neoleonensis (a taxonomic synonym) may refer to:

- Crotalus simus, a.k.a. the Middle American rattlesnake, a venomous pitviper species found in Mexico and Central America
- Crotalus totonacus, a.k.a. the Totonacan rattlesnake, a venomous pitviper species found in northeastern Mexico
