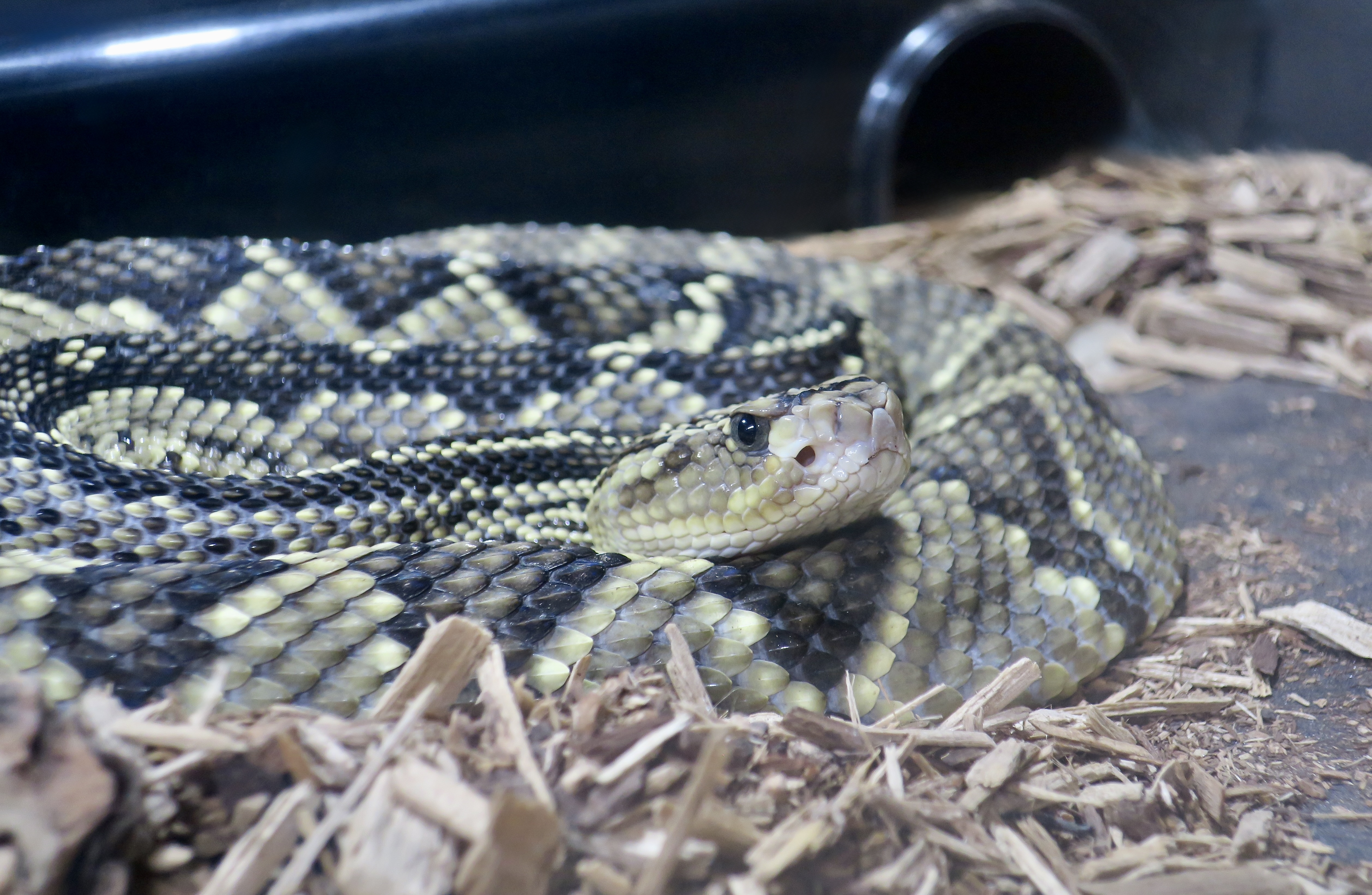

Conservation status
- Least Concern (IUCN 3.1)

Scientific classification
- Kingdom: Animalia
- Phylum: Chordata
- Order: Squamata
- Suborder: Serpentes
- Family: Viperidae
- Genus: Crotalus
- Species: C. totonacus

Binomial name
- Crotalus totonacus Gloyd & Kauffeld, 1940

Synonyms
- Crotalus durissus totonacus H.M. Smith & Taylor, 1945; Crotalus basiliscus totonacus Taylor, 1950; [Crotalus (Crotalus) durissus] totonacus J. Peters & Orejas-Miranda, 1970; Crotalus durissus neoleonensis Juliá-Zertuche & Treviño-Saldaña, 1978 (nomen nudum); Crotalus totonacus Campbell & Lamar, 2004; Crotalus totonacus Quijada-Mascareñas & Wüster, 2006

= Crotalus totonacus =

Species of snake

Common name: Totonacan rattlesnake

Crotalus totonacus is a venomous pit viper species found in northeastern Mexico. No subspecies are currently recognized.

== Description ==
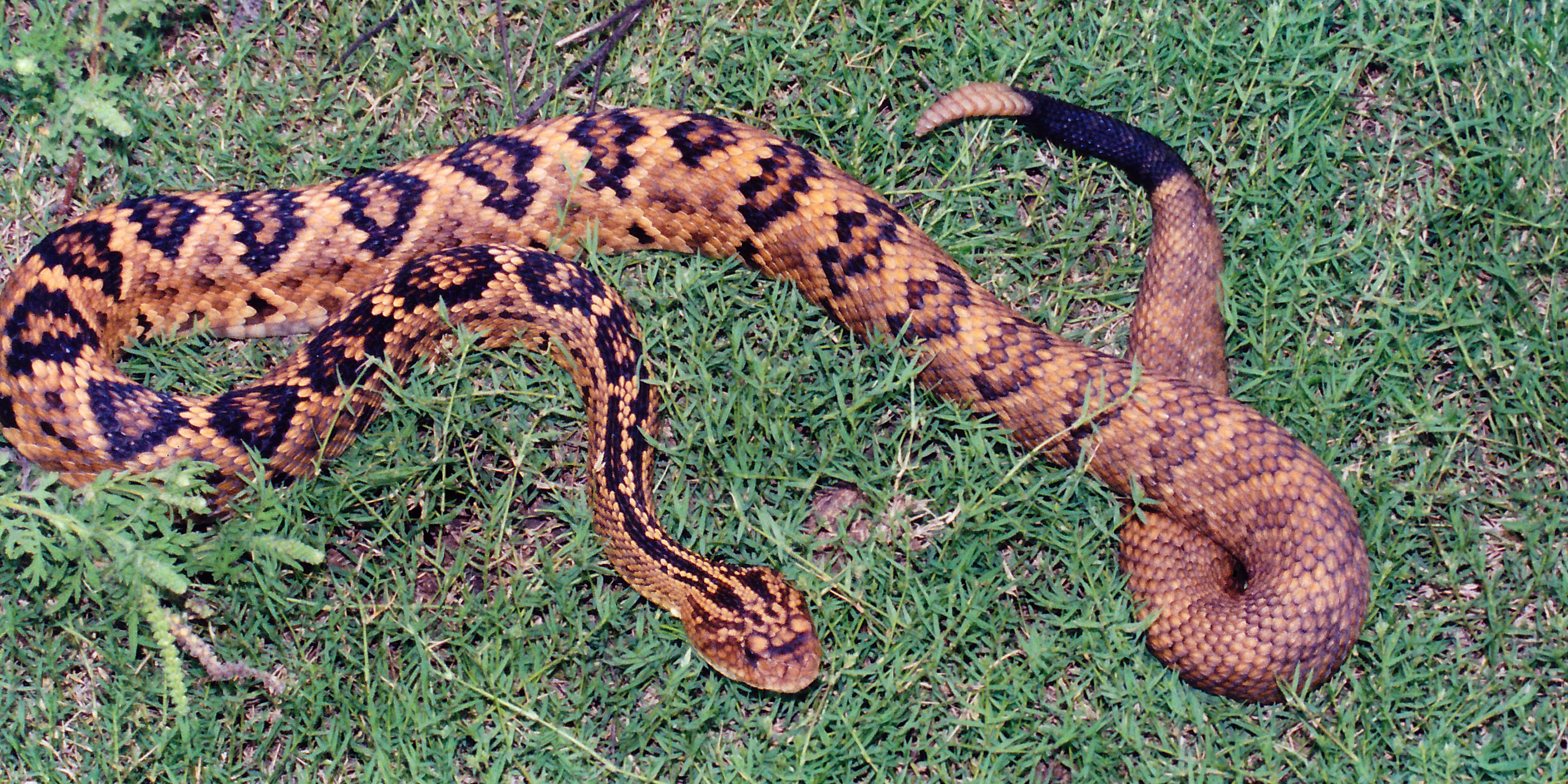
Totonacan Rattlesnake (Crotalus totonacus) in southern Tamaulipas, Mexico (10 July 2005).

Adults frequently grow to more than 150 cm (4 ft 11 in) in length. The largest recorded specimen was 166.5 cm (5 ft 5 1/2 in) in length.

== Geographic range ==
It is found in northeastern Mexico from central Nuevo León through southern Tamaulipas, northern Veracruz, eastern San Luis Potosí and northern Querétaro. The type locality given is "Panaco Island, about 75 miles [120 km] south of Tampico, Veracruz, Mexico, 12 miles [19 km] inland from Cabo Rojo".

== Diet ==
Crotalus totonacus is known to prey on small mammals and birds. In addition to mammal hair and bird feathers found in stomachs, specific prey items include cave rats (Neotoma sp.), Allen's tree squirrels (Sciurus alleni), and rock squirrels (Spermophilus [Otospermophilus] variegatus).

== Taxonomy ==
This species was previously considered a subspecies of C. durissus.
