= Richmond's squirrel =

Conservation status
- Near Threatened (IUCN 3.1)

Scientific classification
- Kingdom: Animalia
- Phylum: Chordata
- Class: Mammalia
- Order: Rodentia
- Family: Sciuridae
- Genus: Sciurus
- Species: S. richmondi

Binomial name
- Sciurus richmondi E. W. Nelson, 1898
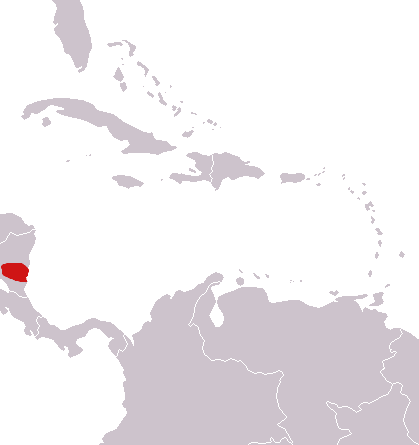
- Richmond's squirrel's range

Species of rodent

Richmond's squirrel (Sciurus richmondi) is a poorly known tree squirrel in the genus Sciurus endemic to Nicaragua, which is likely a synonym of the red-tailed squirrel (Sciurus granatensis). It is locally known as the ardilla del rama.

== Taxonomy ==
It was first described in 1898 by Nelson based on a series of specimens collected in 1892. Specimens were collected again in 1908 and 1910 by Joel Asaph Allen. No more specimens were then collected until 53 were taken in the 1960s.

== Description ==
Very similar to the Sciurus granatensis ssp. hoffmanni, but smaller in size, coloured less brightly, and with lighter coloured hairs on the tail. It has a brown back and tail, the tail streaked with tawny yellowish hairs, and an orange abdomen.

Females have noticeably wider cheekbones than the males, but are otherwise morphologically identical (aside from the obvious).

== Distribution ==
Endemic to Nicaragua. It has mostly been collected in the lowlands on the Atlantic coast, from the border of Costa Rica to Honduras. It is thought to be absent from the Pacific coast, although specimens have been collected near there at the Toro rapids on the Río San Juan near Lake Nicaragua.

== Habitat ==
Its habitat is tropical and subtropical dry broadleaf forests. It has been collected in trees along streams in pastures, cacao plantations, and secondary woodlands in the 1960s, and possibly old growth forests in the 1890s. It occurs from lowlands to about 1,000m.

== Behaviour ==
It is diurnal and probably solitary. It forages on the ground and in the understory and is seldom seen in the canopy, more often on the trunk and lower branches according to Jones Jr. & Genoways in 1971. The breeding season is long, from at least February to September, and litters of mostly three, sometimes two, young were reported by Jones Jr. & Genoways based on six gravid females. Jones Jr. & Genoways reported that it may moult twice a year.

== Similar Species ==
It is closely related to the Sciurus granatensis ssp. hoffmanni which replaces it just across the border with Costa Rica. Genetic studies indicate is likely conspecific with S. granatensis, which has been suspected by most workers on it since it was first named (i.e. Nelson, Allen, Jones Jr. & Genoways, Koprowski & Roth).

Deppe's squirrel (Sciurus deppei) occurs sympatrically with it throughout its range, although at higher elevations, and is also similarly sized and coloured, and similar in behaviour.

== Uses ==
It is sometimes hunted for food in Nicaragua.

== Conservation ==
Jones Jr. & Genoways in 1971 and Reid in 1997 thought the animal probably rare. Baillie considered the species to be 'Lower Risk/near threatened' for the IUCN red list in 1996. In the latest assessment for the IUCN in 2008 the taxon was given a 'Near Threatened' status as it was thought to have a known extent of occurrence of close to 20,000 km2, and the assessors thought it was possible the population was in decline, likely based on anecdotes from the 1970s. The IUCN stated in 2008 that deforestation is a major threat to this species, likely echoing Jones Jr. & Genoways in 1971.
