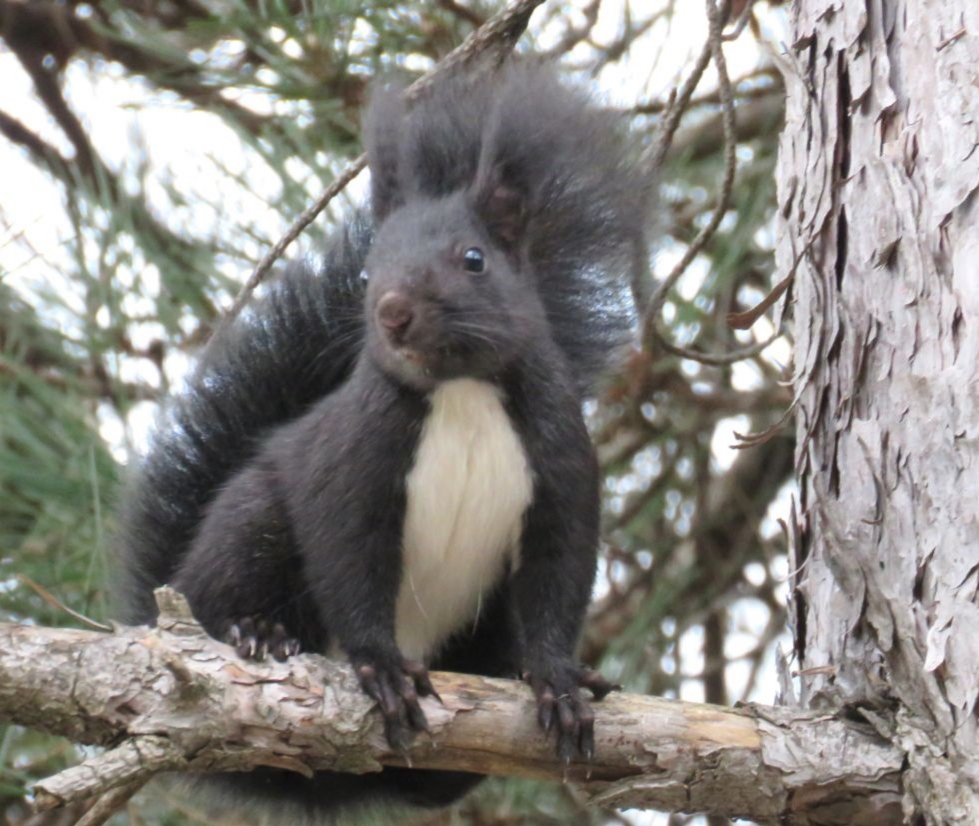

Conservation status
- Near Threatened (IUCN 3.1)

Scientific classification
- Kingdom: Animalia
- Phylum: Chordata
- Class: Mammalia
- Infraclass: Placentalia
- Order: Rodentia
- Family: Sciuridae
- Genus: Sciurus
- Species: S. meridionalis

Binomial name
- Sciurus meridionalis Lucifero, 1907
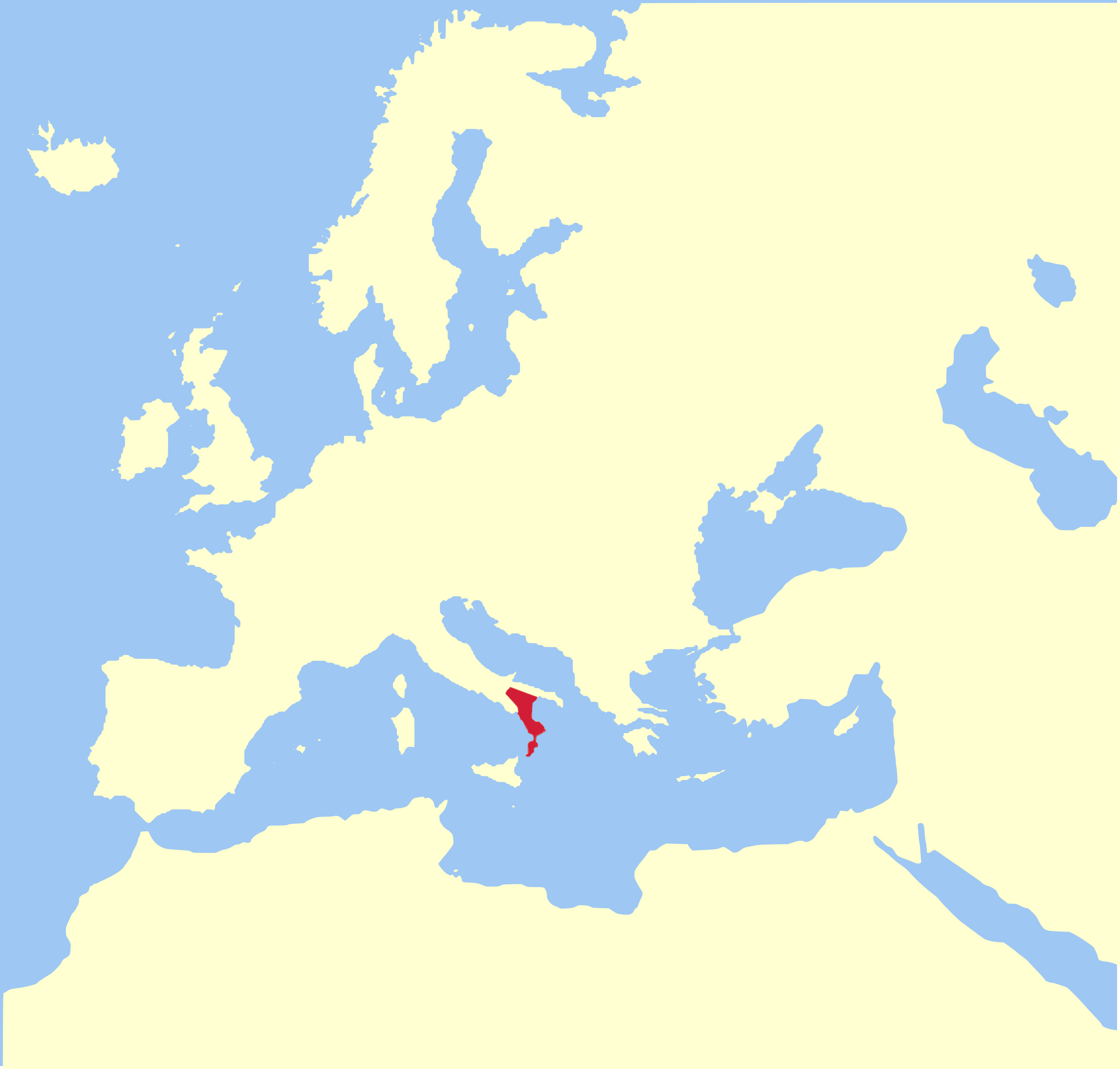
- Approximate distribution in red

Synonyms
- Sciurus vulgaris meridionalis (Lucifero, 1907); Sciurus vulgaris silanus Heinrich, 1934

= Calabrian black squirrel =

Species of rodent

The Calabrian black squirrel (Sciurus meridionalis) is a species of tree squirrel in the genus Sciurus, endemic to the forests of the regions of Calabria and Basilicata, in the south of the Italian Peninsula.

== Taxonomy ==
The Calabrian black squirrel was originally classified as a subspecies of the red squirrel (Sciurus vulgaris). However, studies published in 2009–2017 determined that it is unique in both genetics and appearance, leading to its recognition as a distinct species.

Genetic testing in 2024 determined that the most recent ancestral population for the species existed in central Calabria during the Middle Pleistocene. Afterwards, the species underwent multiple periods of expansion and fragmentation as its preferred habitat extended during interglacials and shrank during glacial periods, culminating in its present range centered around three populations centered on distinct mountain massifs.

== Description ==
The Calabrian black squirrel is an arboreal animal that generally resembles the red squirrel in its behavior. Unlike the highly variable red squirrel, the Calabrian black squirrel is monomorphic (not variable in appearance), being very dark brown to blackish with contrasting white underparts. Compared to red squirrels of northern Italy, the Calabrian black squirrel is also significantly larger, weighing 280–530 g (10–18.5 oz) or on average about 35% more.

== Habitat and range ==
The Calabrian black squirrel lives in mixed forests in highlands, and its nests are often placed in pine or oak trees. It mostly occurs near black pine, as the seeds are an important food source. In the Sila massif, the densest populations tend to occur in areas of mixed European beech and black pine woodland, followed by pure black pine, while pure beech and chestnut forests tend to host the lowest population densities. Within the same habitats, denser populations occur in areas with relatively easy access to stands of pine forest. In the Pollino massif, squirrels favor mixed pine and oak woodlands, and secondarily pure pine woodlands, and tend to avoid pure beech forests. Chestnut woodland is particularly disfavored due to the scarce understory limiting food outside of the trees' fruiting season in autumn, while beech forest is unsuitable due to the irregular pattern of dense and scarce seeding of beech trees.

The historic range of the Calabrian black squirrel's range consisted of three distinct populations in the Aspromonte massif, La Sila plateau, and Pollino massif on the border with Basilicata, although the Sila and Pollino populations have merged in recent decades due to reforestation in the highlands connecting them. It is absent from the Serre Calabresi between the Aspromonte and La Sila. The northern limit of its range has been the northern Pollino, but it is slowly spreading north to the Lucan Apennines in Basilicata. Its northernmost range limit and the southernmost presence of the Italian red squirrel are separated by a gap of more than 100 km (60 mi).

== Ecology and behavior ==
Calabrian black squirrels forage primarily on conifers, but shift between different food sources over the year. In spring and early summer, berries and pine buds, shoots, and male flowers are the primary sources of forage. Over the summer, their primary food source shifts to the seeds of immature pine cones. In autumn, the squirrels' diet favors chestnuts and beechnuts.

Black squirrels favor black pines and oaks as sites for dreys. Other tree species such as beech are typically avoided.

== Conservation ==
The Calabrian black squirrel has a stable population, but its small range means that it likely qualifies for near threatened or perhaps vulnerable; the IUCN lists it as near threatened. The most serious threat is possibly the Finlayson's squirrel, which has been introduced near its range.
