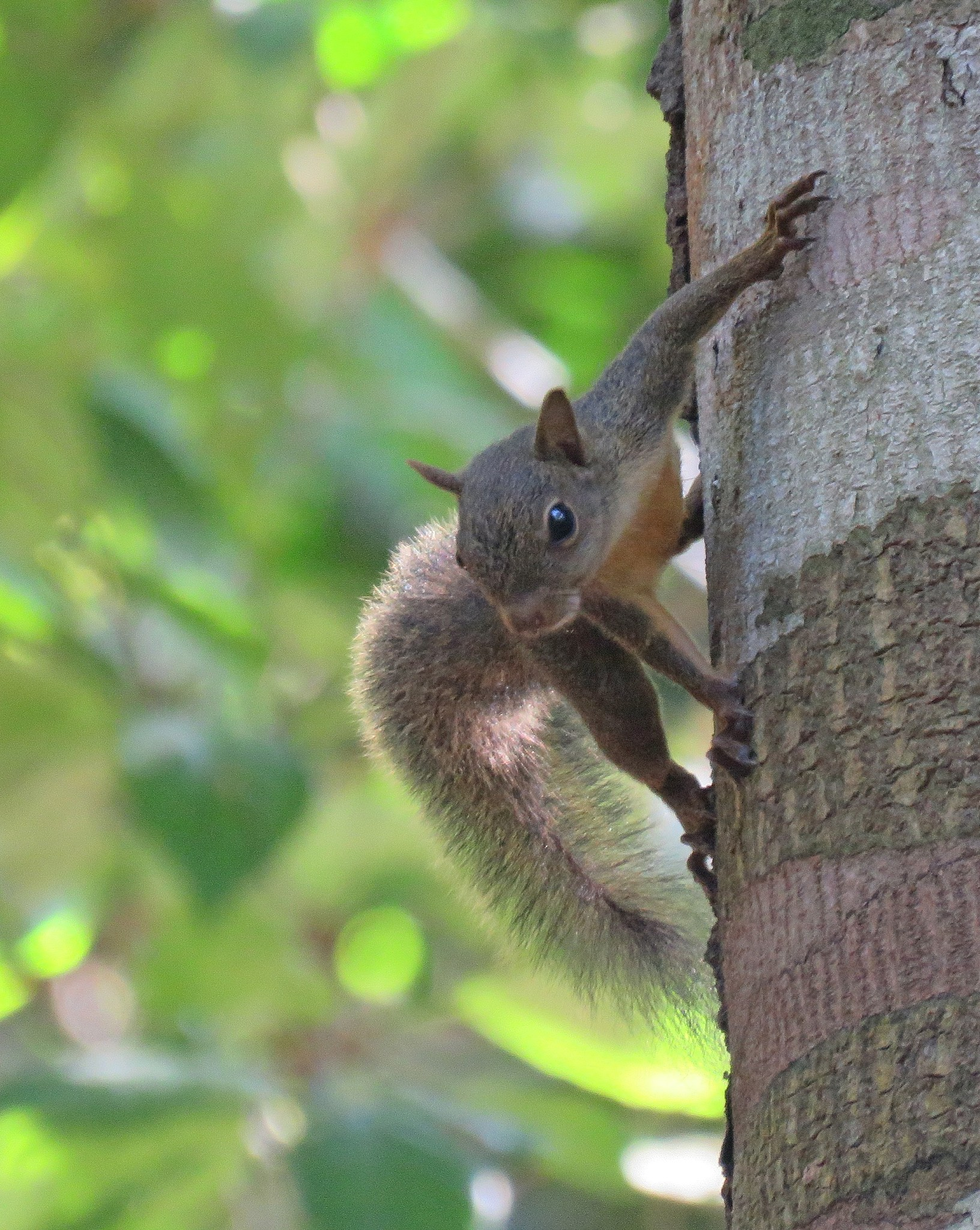
- Mato Grosso, Brazil

Conservation status
- Data Deficient (IUCN 3.1)

Scientific classification
- Kingdom: Animalia
- Phylum: Chordata
- Class: Mammalia
- Order: Rodentia
- Family: Sciuridae
- Genus: Sciurus
- Species: S. gilvigularis

Binomial name
- Sciurus gilvigularis Wagner, 1842

Subspecies
- S. g. gilvigularis; S. g. paraensis
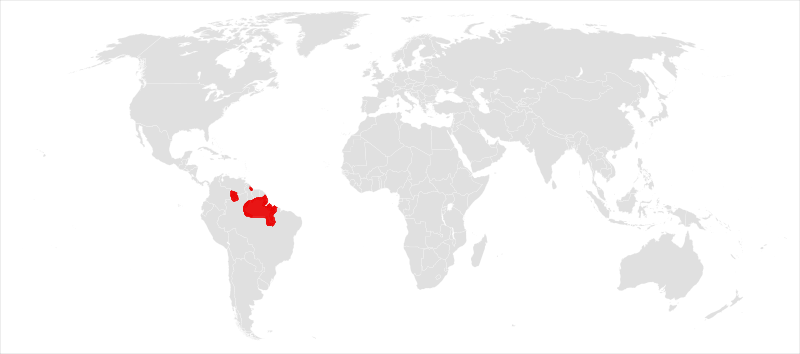
- Yellow-throated squirrel's range

= Yellow-throated squirrel =

Species of rodent

The yellow-throated squirrel (Sciurus gilvigularis) is a tree squirrel in the genus Sciurus endemic to South America. It is found in Brazil, Guyana and Venezuela.

== Description ==
Yellow-throated squirrels are colored buff-and-black on their upper bodies. Their ventral fur is orange, tending to be darkest on the upper chest and fading to a paler color on the throat and belly. The tail is grizzled with black and buff, and may display faint bands.

== Distribution and habitat ==
The species' range is poorly studied. Disjunct populations are known to exist in Venezuela, Guyana, and northern Brazil. They are found primarily in coastal forests dominated by palms, lianas, and rattans. They are not recorded in secondary or disturbed forests.

== Ecology and behavior ==
Yellow-throated squirrels feed primarily on palm seeds and fruits. The seeds of the maripa palm in particular are a major food source.
