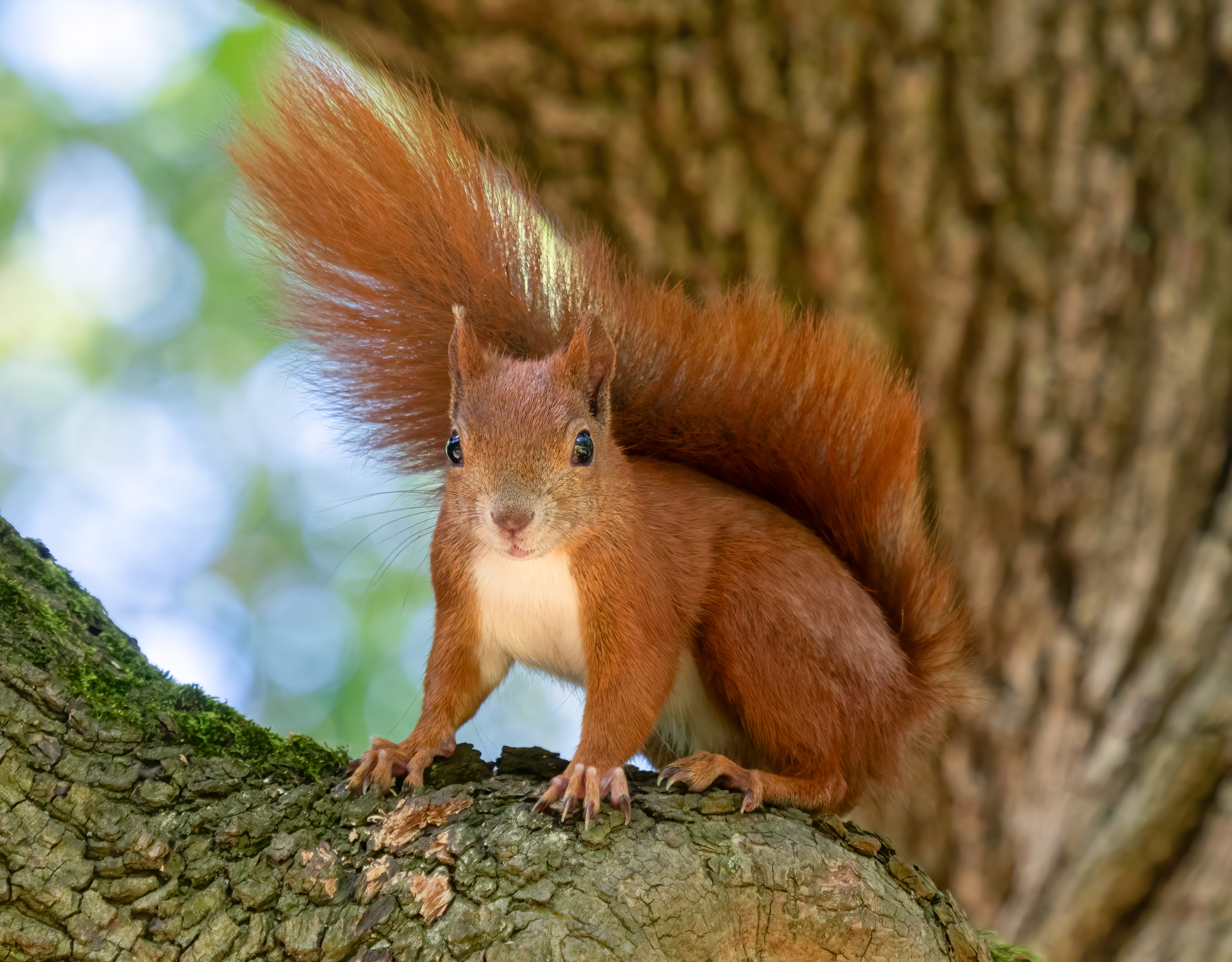
- Red squirrel (Sciurus vulgaris)

Scientific classification
- Kingdom: Animalia
- Phylum: Chordata
- Class: Mammalia
- Order: Rodentia
- Family: Sciuridae
- Tribe: Sciurini
- Genus: Sciurus; Linnaeus, 1758

Type species
- Sciurus vulgaris Linnaeus, 1758

Subgenera
- Tenes; Sciurus; Hesperosciurus; Otosciurus; Guerlinguetus; Hadrosciurus; Urosciurus

= Sciurus =

Sciurus Temporal range: Middle Miocene–Recent

Genus of rodents

The genus Sciurus (/saɪˈjʊərəs/ or /sɪˈjuːrəs/) contains most of the common, bushy-tailed squirrels in North America, Europe, temperate Asia, Central America and South America.

== Species ==
The number of species in the genus is subject to change. In 2005, Thorington & Hoffman- whose taxonomic interpretation is followed by the IUCN website- accepted 28 species in the genus: (Note: Most squirrel assessments were written in 2008, despite most being dated 2016/2017)

Genus Sciurus

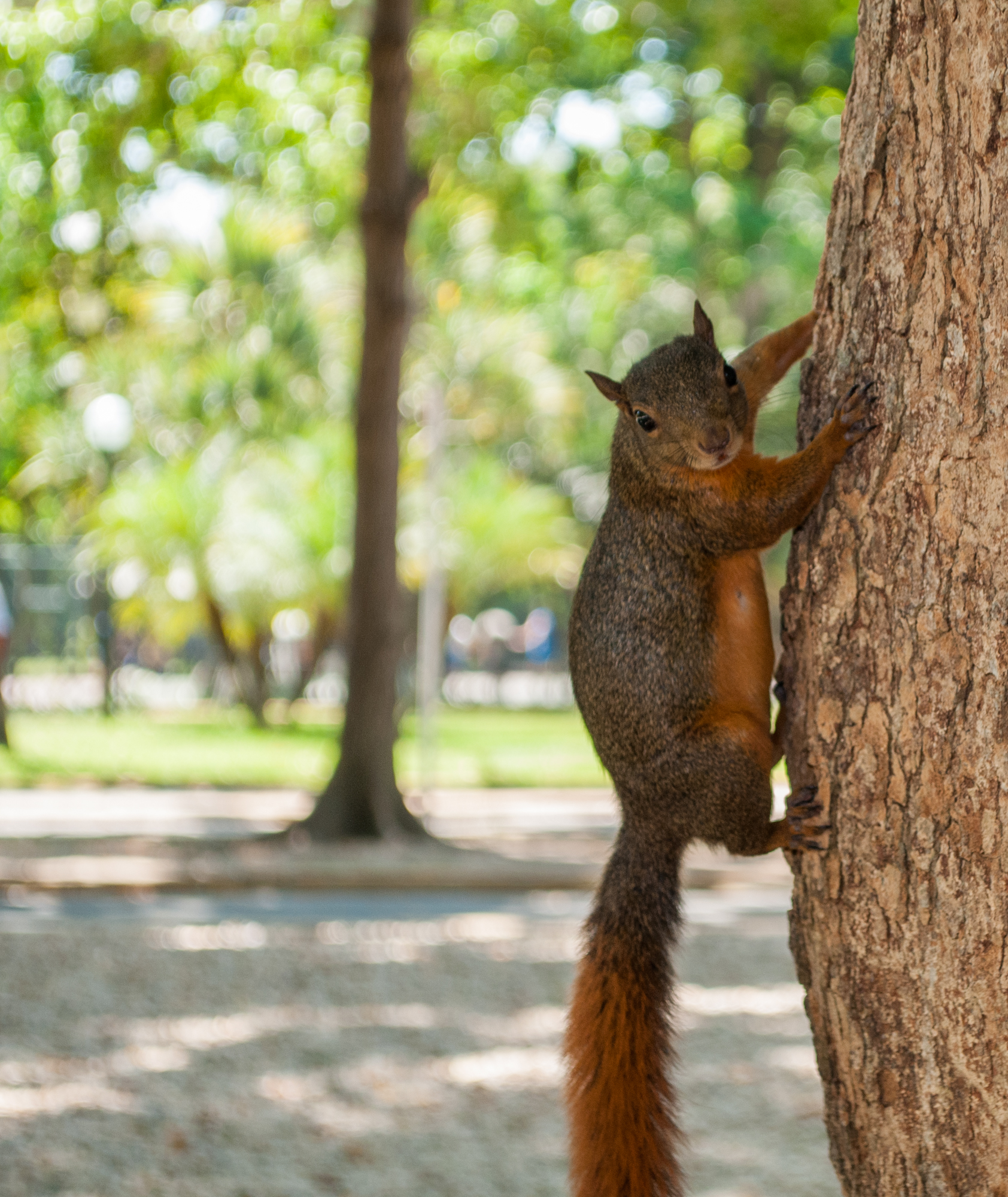
Sciurus granatensis

- Subgenus Sciurus
  - Allen's squirrel, Sciurus alleni
  - Arizona gray squirrel, Sciurus arizonensis
  - Mexican gray squirrel, Sciurus aureogaster
  - Eastern gray squirrel, Sciurus carolinensis
  - Collie's squirrel, Sciurus colliaei
  - Deppe's squirrel, Sciurus deppei
  - Japanese squirrel, Sciurus lis
  - Calabrian black squirrel, Sciurus meridionalis
  - Mexican fox squirrel, Sciurus nayaritensis
  - Fox squirrel, Sciurus niger
  - Peters's squirrel, Sciurus oculatus
  - Variegated squirrel, Sciurus variegatoides
  - Eurasian red squirrel, Sciurus vulgaris
  - Yucatan squirrel, Sciurus yucatanensis
- Subgenus Otosciurus
  - Abert's squirrel, Sciurus aberti
- Subgenus Guerlinguetus
  - Brazilian squirrel (Guianan squirrel), Sciurus aestuans
  - Yellow-throated squirrel, Sciurus gilvigularis
  - Red-tailed squirrel, Sciurus granatensis
  - Bolivian squirrel, Sciurus ignitus
  - Ingram's squirrel, Sciurus ingrami
  - Andean squirrel, Sciurus pucheranii
  - Richmond's squirrel, Sciurus richmondi
  - Sanborn's squirrel, Sciurus sanborni
  - Guayaquil squirrel, Sciurus stramineus
- Subgenus Tenes
  - Persian squirrel, Sciurus anomalus
- Subgenus Hadrosciurus
  - Fiery squirrel, Sciurus flammifer
  - Junín red squirrel, Sciurus pyrrhinus
- Subgenus Hesperosciurus
  - Western gray squirrel, Sciurus griseus
- Subgenus Urosciurus
  - Northern Amazon red squirrel, Sciurus igniventris
  - Southern Amazon red squirrel, Sciurus spadiceus

In 2015, 15–17 species were left in the genus Sciurus after de Vivo & Carmignotto comprehensively reviewed South American Sciuridae for the first time in many decades and proposed numerous changes; synonymising some species and many subspecies, splitting another species, and naming new species. They followed Joel Asaph Allen's unsatisfying 1914 attempt in splitting the genus Sciurus by raising the South American subgenera to the rank of genus, adding Urosciurus to Hadrosciurus, and splitting the genus Guerlinguetus in three. Their taxonomic treatment might also require Sciurus deppei to be moved to Notosciurus.

A 2020 paper published on the taxonomy of Sciurinae split Sciurus into multiple new genera and elevated several subgenera. The paper included genetic sampling from almost all recognized species and recommends the following species assignments:

- Sciurus
  - Persian squirrel, S. anomalus
  - Eurasian red squirrel, S. vulgaris
  - Calabrian black squirrel, S. meridionalis
  - Japanese squirrel, S. lis
- Hesperosciurus
  - Abert's squirrel, H. aberti
  - Western gray squirrel, H. griseus
- Parasciurus
  - Allen's squirrel, P. alleni
  - Arizona gray squirrel, P. arizonensis
  - Mexican fox squirrel, P. nayaritensis
  - Fox squirrel, P. niger
  - Peters's squirrel, P. oculatus
- Neosciurus
  - Eastern gray squirrel, N. carolinensis
- Echinosciurus
  - Mexican gray squirrel, E. aureogaster
  - Collie's squirrel, E. colliaei
  - Deppe's squirrel, E. deppei
  - Variegated squirrel, E. variegatoides
  - Yucatan squirrel, E. yucatanensis
- Simosciurus
  - S. nebouxii
  - Guayaquil squirrel, S. stramineus
- Guerlinguetus
  - Brazilian squirrel, G. aestuans
  - G. brasiliensis
- Hadrosciurus
  - Bolivian squirrel, H. ignitus
  - Northern Amazon red squirrel, H. igniventris
  - Junín red squirrel, H. pyrrhinus
  - Southern Amazon red squirrel, H. spadiceus

Additionally, the paper suggests moving Andean squirrel back to subtribe Microsciurina, the dwarf squirrels, and assigns it to the newly described genus Leptosciurus. The paper's findings agree with prior assessments to synonymize Richmond's squirrel into Red-tailed squirrel and reassigns the Red-tailed squirrel into the previously monotypic South American genus Syntheosciurus, also in Microsciurina. The paper did not include genetic sampling or taxonomic suggestions for gilvigularis, meridionalis, sanborni, or flammifer.
