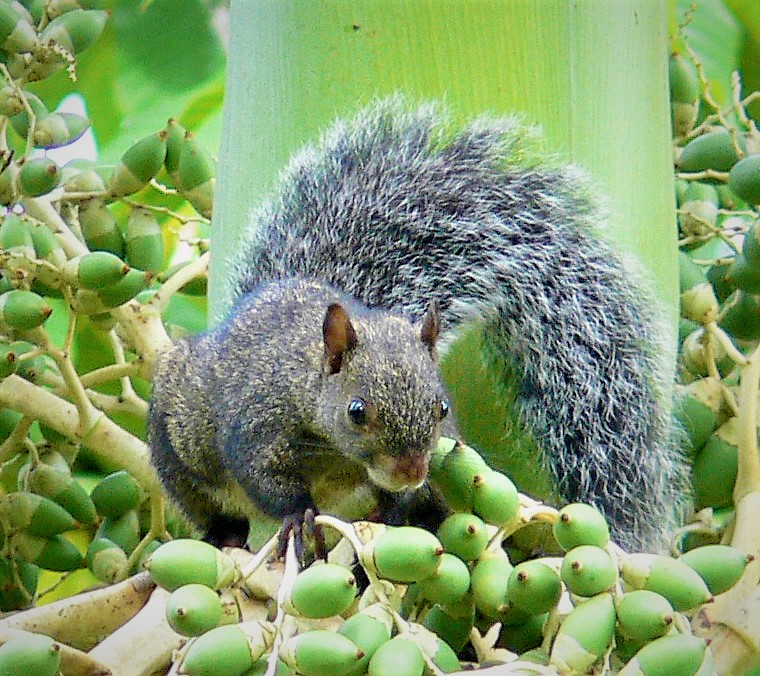

Conservation status
- Least Concern (IUCN 3.1)

Scientific classification
- Kingdom: Animalia
- Phylum: Chordata
- Class: Mammalia
- Order: Rodentia
- Family: Sciuridae
- Genus: Sciurus
- Species: S. yucatanensis

Binomial name
- Sciurus yucatanensis J. A. Allen, 1877

Subspecies
- S. y. yucatanensis; S. y. baliolus; S. y. phaeopus
- range of the Yucatan squirrel

Synonyms
- Sciurus carolinensis var. yucatanensis J.A. Allen, 1877

= Yucatan squirrel =

Species of rodent

The Yucatan squirrel (Sciurus yucatanensis), originally named the Yucatan gray squirrel, also once named the Campeche squirrel, is a tree squirrel in the genus Sciurus found in the Yucatán Peninsula and adjacent areas. It is native to northern Belize, northeastern Guatemala, and southeast Mexico.

== Biology ==
The Yucatan squirrel lives in dry deciduous and evergreen forests, semiarid pine-oak woodlands, and secondary forest growing in formerly logged areas. They are found in lowlands below an altitude of 750 metres (2,460 ft). They are active during the day and rest during the night, spending most of their time in trees. They are most active in the early morning, but may be seen sunning on a branch later in the day.

Their dreys (or nests), to be found in branches high up in the trees, are built from leaves and twigs. Their food consists of soft fruit, nuts and seeds, whilst Reid in 2009 concluded that their main diet consists of flowers, buds, and shoots. Females generally give birth to two or three young during the April to August dry season.

They are predated by birds of prey, wild cats and dogs, procyonids, primates, and snakes.

=== Dimensions and description ===
The Yucatan squirrel is 450–500 millimetres (18–20 in) long, larger in size than the eastern gray squirrel (S. carolinensis). The Yucatan squirrel, Collie's squirrel (S. colliaei), and the variegated squirrel (S. variegatoides) have similar fur colours and patterns, but differ in size. The relatively long adult tail of has a length of 240 mm (9.4 in). Both sexes are the same size, with a mass of 341–475 grams (12.0–16.8 oz).

Its pelage is coarse and harsh. The upper parts of the body are coloured black and grey, with additional yellow to ochraceous buff colourings. The lower body is colured off-white, yellow-grey and black. The tail is white, with a well-defined lines of black, and black on either side of the central white area. The tail hairs are shorter than on the head and body. The face has a buff-coloured patch above the nose, with the sides of head coloured mainly black. The grey, brown and white ears are narrow and pointed, tufted and an off-white colour from November to February in northern populations and from February to April in southern populations.

The skull of S. yucatanensis is short and broad, with a length of about 57 mm (2.2 in), the facial portion being particularly short.

== Taxonomy ==
This taxon was originally described as a variety of the gray squirrel as Sciurus carolinensis var. yucatanensis by the American zoologist Joel Asaph Allen in 1877, based on four specimens he received from Mérida, Yucatán, collected by the German-American collector Arthur Schott in 1865. In his 1877 report Monographs of North American Rodentia, Allen mused if it was not more appropriate to name the animal as a separate species, based on the observed distinctiveness of the specimens he had collected. He coined the name 'Yucatan gray squirrel'. S. yucatanensis ssp. baliolus was published by the American naturalist Edward William Nelson in 1901, based on a specimen from Apazote, in Campeche, Mexico. S. yucatanensis ssp. phaeopus was published by George G. Goodwin in 1932 based on 11 specimens collected in Secanquim and Finca Chamá, in Alta Verapaz, Guatemala.

Three subspecies are recognised:

- S. y. yucatanensis (J.A. Allen), 1877 - Found within the end of the Yucatán Peninsula in the Mexican states of Yucatán, southwest to Campeche up to the Champotón Municipality and Quintana Roo, and further south to the northern Belize districts of Orange Walk and Corozal. It has the largest known distribution. It is found in arid woodlands.
- S. y. baliolus Nelson, 1901 - Found further southwest from the range of the nominate form in a band across the Yucatán Peninsula from the Champotón Municipality and southwest of the Laguna de Términos in Campeche State and eastern Tabasco State north of the Usumacinta River in Mexico, through northeast Petén Department in Guatemala, to Cayo and Belize districts in Belize. It is distinguished from the nominate form by virtue of a darker pelage. It inhabits more moist, evergreen woodlands than the nominate form. Nelson coined the name Campeche squirrel for it in 1901.
- S. y. phaeopus Goodwin, 1932 - Found at the base of the Yucatán Peninsula from the Mexican states of northwestern and eastern Chiapas east to southern Petén and Alta Verapaz departments of Guatemala and further east along the coast of Belize District in Belize. It is distinguished from the other subspecies being the darkest of the three, possessing black legs, tail and at the base of the ears. It was originally found inhabiting pine-oak woodlands at an altitude of around 366 metres (1,200 ft).

== Interaction with humans ==
Deforestation is considered to be a 'major threat' to the population, which may also be affected by hunting, in particular in the northern end of the Yucatán Peninsula.
