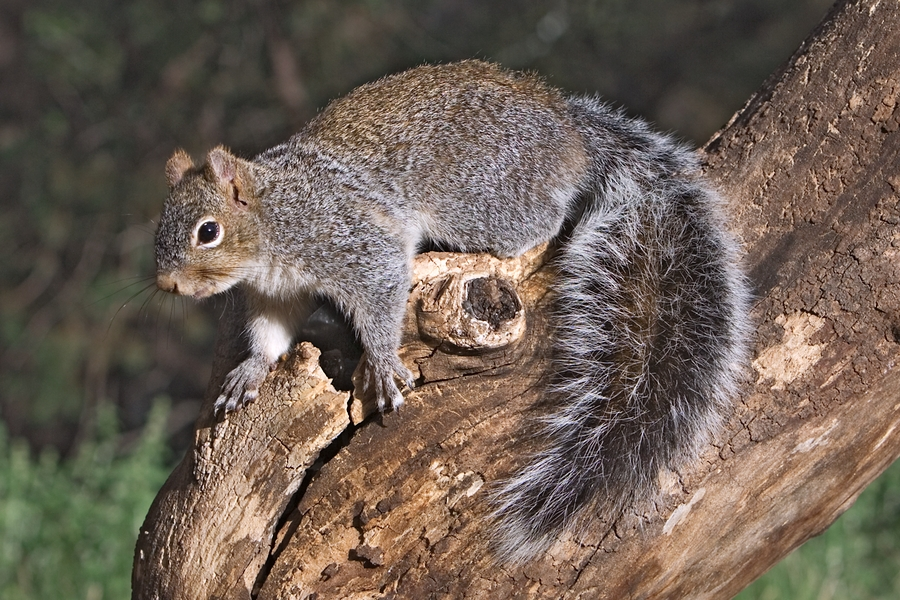

Conservation status
- Near Threatened (IUCN 3.1)

- Apparently Secure (NatureServe)

Scientific classification
- Kingdom: Animalia
- Phylum: Chordata
- Class: Mammalia
- Infraclass: Placentalia
- Order: Rodentia
- Family: Sciuridae
- Genus: Sciurus
- Species: S. arizonensis

Binomial name
- Sciurus arizonensis Coues, 1867

Subspecies
- S. a. arizonensis; S. a. catalinae; S. a. huachuca
- Arizona gray squirrel range

= Arizona gray squirrel =

Species of rodent

The Arizona gray squirrel (Sciurus arizonensis) is a tree squirrel, in the genus Sciurus, endemic to the canyons and valleys surrounded by deciduous and mixed forests in eastern Arizona and northern Mexico.

It is threatened by habitat loss. The only other large squirrel that is within its range is Abert's squirrel, which has ear tufts and lives in pine forests. Although they act and look like other gray squirrels, the Arizona gray squirrel is actually more closely related to the fox squirrel.

== Phylogeny and description ==
Sciurus arizonensis is a member of the order Rodentia and the family Sciuridae. It is primarily silvery-gray, with a white to cream belly and a gray tail frosted with white. It is distinguishable from Sciurus aberti by its longer flatter skull, broader rostrum, and having only one molar instead of two. S. arizonensis also has smaller ears with no tufts and a red/black stripe on the underside of their tail. Some sexual dimorphism can be seen in these squirrels, but it varies with some populations having larger males, and other populations having larger females.

== Distribution and habitat ==
Sciurus arizonensis can be found in parts of Arizona, New Mexico and Sonora, Mexico. They live in the mountains ranging from low-elevation pine-oak forests to higher elevation coniferous forests. They are also found at mid-elevations in riparian habitats, usually broadleaf riparian forests. Riparian forests with large cottonwood and sycamore trees host the largest populations of this species.

The Arizona gray squirrel has had no recent expansion or reduction in the size of their range in New Mexico, although there has been some population decline. This is due to habitat loss and the introduction of Abert's squirrel, which has in some cases outcompeted the Arizona gray squirrel for resources.

== Ecology ==
Arizona gray squirrels nest in dreys woven from twigs and leaves in the canopies of large trees or, where available, in naturally-occurring tree cavities.

There is significant disparity in average territory sizes between sexes. Male home ranges are typically 113 hectares (280 acres), while female ranges more commonly cover 14 hectares (35 acres). Male typically attempt to maximize overlap with female territories, particularly during the mating season.

Arizona gray squirrels are hunted primarily by large raptors, foxes, and bobcats. When alarmed, they make a barking or chucking alarm call from an elevated location.

=== Diet ===
Arizona gray squirrels have a broad diet. Tree seeds are an important food source, particularly the cones of pines, Douglas fir, and true firs, which are consumed by removing individual scales to expose seeds, and deciduous seeds such as acorns and walnuts. Additional food sources include tree sap, tree bark, insect galls, flowers, and fungi. Scatter-hoarding of seeds in leaf litter and topsoil is observed, but rare.

=== Reproduction ===
Female Arizona gray squirrels undergo a day-long estrus between February and May. Males have external testes between winter and summer, which withdraw into the body during the rest of the year. Multiple males engage in a mating chase with one female, and a litter of three to four young is born in late spring to early summer.

Arizona gray squirrels have large variations in their diet, which has led to reproduction rates that vary year by year. Not all females breed each year, which can be seen by a lack of placental scarring. The timing of Arizona gray squirrel mating correlates with the prime time for flowers, which are a high energy food source for the energetically expensive costs of mating. Because mating is so energetically expensive, optimal reproduction timing is very important to ensure that offspring and parent will survive. This timing can differ between sexes and is largely dependent on the environmental change present in their habitat, which can often be fluctuating throughout the year and from year to year. Differences in the parental investment and a lack of food are responsible for shifts in male and female ranges. The opposite sexes have ranges that overlap with each other and during good mating conditions or season these ranges will expand and overlap more.

== Conservation ==
An important conservation strategy for the survival of the Arizona gray squirrel is to protect their nesting habitat. This means maintaining large trees with closed canopies that allow access to resources and protection from predators.

== Interaction with humans ==
Arizona gray squirrels are frequently hunted for meat across most of their range. It is not considered to be a significant pest species due to inhabiting areas of low human population density.
