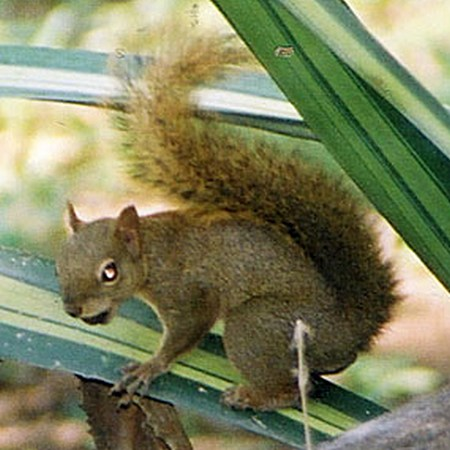

Conservation status
- Least Concern (IUCN 3.1)

Scientific classification
- Kingdom: Animalia
- Phylum: Chordata
- Class: Mammalia
- Infraclass: Placentalia
- Order: Rodentia
- Family: Sciuridae
- Genus: Sciurus
- Species: S. ignitus

Binomial name
- Sciurus ignitus (J. E. Gray, 1867)

Subspecies
- See text
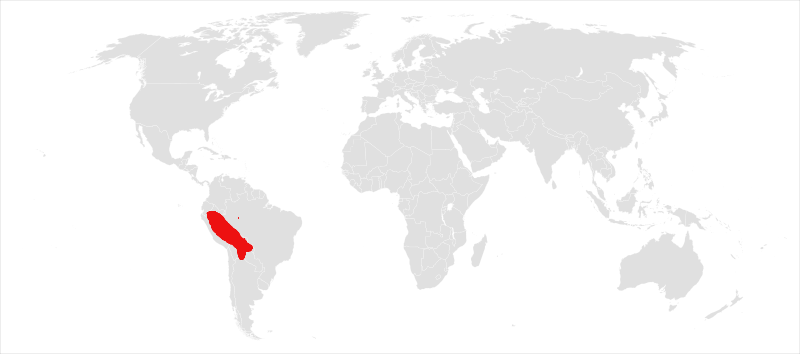
- Bolivian squirrel's range

= Bolivian squirrel =

Species of rodent

The Bolivian squirrel (Sciurus ignitus) is a tree squirrel that is endemic to South America. Little is known of the species, which may represent a species complex.

== Description ==
Bolivian squirrels are moderately sized tree squirrels, with a head-body length of 14 to 22 cm (5.5 to 8.7 in), and a tail of similar length again. Adults weigh from 183 to 242 g (6.5 to 8.5 oz). The fur is mostly dark olive with black and yellow ticking and fading to pale grey or whitish on the chest and underparts. There are faint rings of buff-coloured fur around the eyes and distinct patches of buff fur on the backs of the ears. Females have three pairs of teats.

== Distribution and habitat ==
Bolivian squirrels live along the eastern edge of the Andes from Peru, through Bolivia and Brazil to extreme northern Argentina. Precise details of its habitat are not clear, although it has been found in both lowland and montane tropical forests from 200 to 2,700 m (660 to 8,860 ft) elevation.

Five subspecies are recognised:

- S. i. ignitus - East of the Andes, in Bolivia and adjacent parts of Peru. Belly fur is ochre.
- S. i. argentinius - From Bolivia to the extreme northwest of Argentina. Belly fur is yellow, ears are tinged pink to red.
- S. i. boliviensis - Most of Bolivia. Large-bodied, with a white belly.
- S. i. cabrerai - Brazil. Dark chestnut fir with reddish hair tips. Ears are fulvous with have orange edges and a fulvous postauricular tuft. This subspecies is known from a single partial specimen.
- S. i. irroratus - Peru, east of the Andes. Belly fur is yellow.

== Ecology and behaviour ==
Bolivian squirrels are diurnal and spend the day moving through the understory and subcanopy of the forest. They are omnivorous, feeding on a mixture of nuts, fruits, fungi, and insects. They are generally solitary, and construct round nests from leaves and twigs, hidden among foliage and vines about 6 to 10 m (20 to 33 ft) above the ground. Juveniles have been captured in June and July, and pregnant mothers in August, which may suggest that they breed during the dry season.
