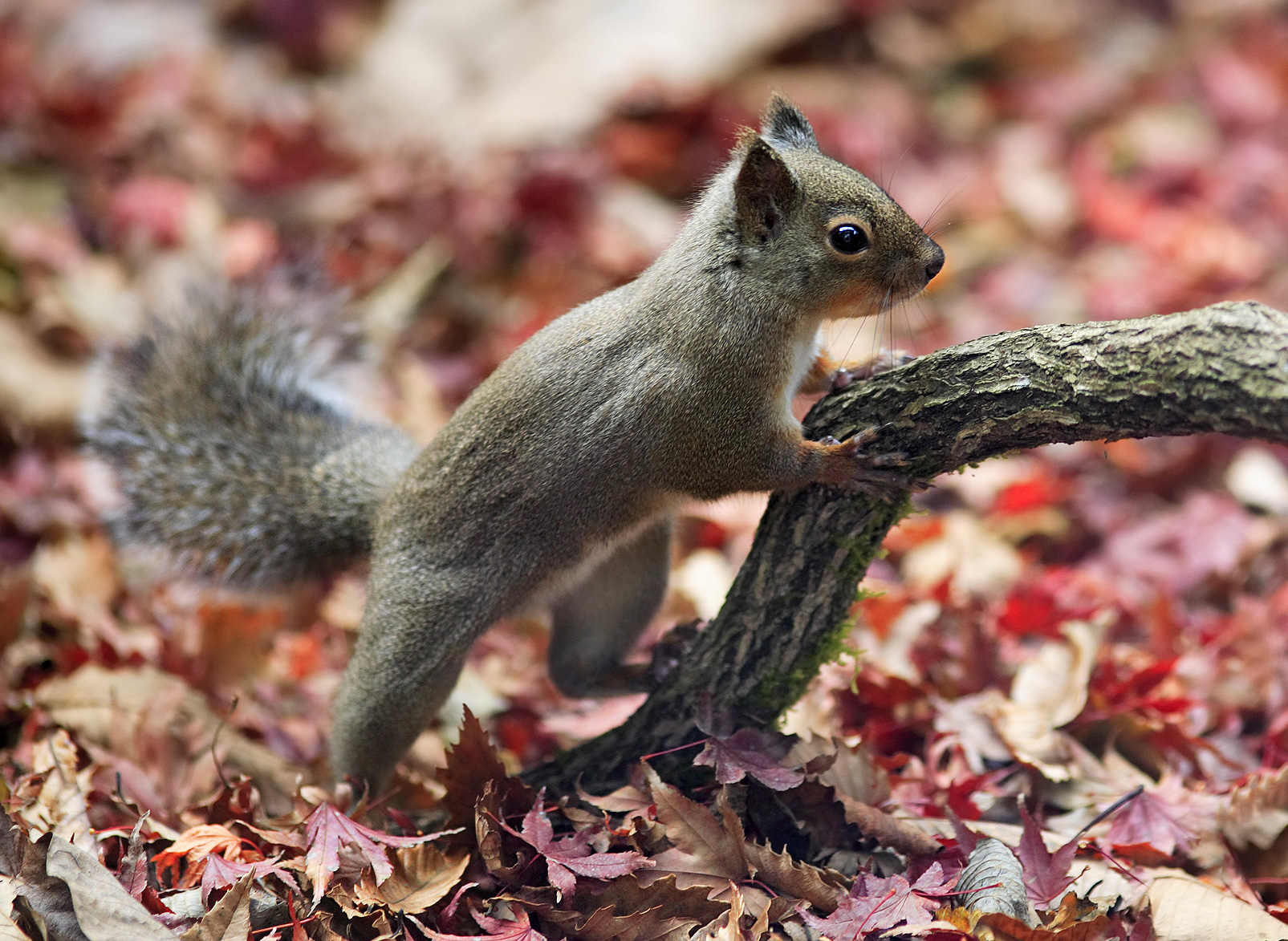

Conservation status
- Least Concern (IUCN 3.1)

Scientific classification
- Kingdom: Animalia
- Phylum: Chordata
- Class: Mammalia
- Order: Rodentia
- Family: Sciuridae
- Genus: Sciurus
- Species: S. lis

Binomial name
- Sciurus lis Temminck, 1844
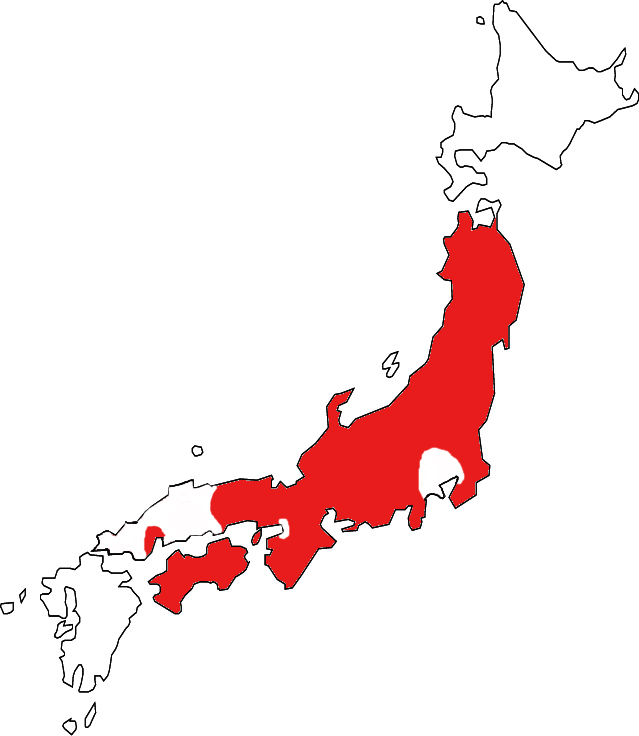
- Japanese squirrel's range

= Japanese squirrel =

Species of mammal

The Japanese squirrel (Sciurus lis) is a tree squirrel in the genus Sciurus endemic to Japan. It is closely related to and similar to the red squirrel.

== Taxonomy and evolution ==
The Japanese squirrel was described by Dutch zoologist Coenraad Jacob Temminck in 1844. It was historically classified as a subspecies of Sciurus vulgaris, the Eurasian red squirrel, although scientific opinion shifted towards classifying it as a distinct species beginning in the 1960s. The Japanese squirrel is nonetheless closely related to the red squirrel, and originated from a population of red squirrels that colonized the Japanese archipelago in the Pleistocene and speciated into a distinct population due to the isolation of the islands from the Eurasian mainland. Recognizable Sciurus lis remains appear in the fossil record beginning in the Middle Pleistocene.

== Description ==
Japanese squirrels range from 16–22 centimetres (6.3–8.7 in) in body length from the head to the base of the tail, which makes up a further 13–17 centimetres (5.1–6.7 in). Their typical body weight is 250–310 grams (8.8–10.9 oz).

Japanese squirrels have red-brown fur on their bodies and tails, with orange patches sometimes present on the sides and legs, that becomes grey over the winter. A white ring is typically present around the eye. The belly is white year-round.

== Distribution and habitat ==
The Japanese squirrel's native range consists of the islands of Honshū, Shikoku, and Kyūshū. Several populations in southern Honshū have disappeared, chiefly due to habitat loss, and the species is believed to have become extirpated from Kyūshū.. The Japanese squirrel is absent from Hokkaido, where it is replaced by the Sciurus vulgaris orientis subspecies of the related red squirrel, which is conversely absent from the rest of the Japanese archipelago outside of Hokkaido.

Japanese squirrels live primarily in mixed-species to pine lowland and subalpine forests.

== Ecology and behavior ==
Japanese squirrels are diurnal and active throughout the year. They are solitary as adults, with minimal overlap between home ranges. Males typically defend a territory of 4–30 hectares (9.9–74.1 acres), while females defend territories of 4–17 hectares (9.9–42.0 acres). Territories tend to be larger in heavily fragmented environments, as squirrels need to incorporate larger quantities of less-suitable marginal habitat.

It has been found that fallen dead trees serve as landmarks for the movement, vigilance, and resting of Japanese squirrels. Deadwood also can serve as hoarding sites for Japanese squirrels, which is crucial for their survival. The increase of deadwood may provide benefits to small mammals, such as the Japanese squirrel, and the quality of habitat is improved significantly.

The Japanese squirrel's predators include the Japanese marten, foxes, domestic cats, domestic dogs, and predatory birds including raptors and crows.

=== Diet ===
Japanese squirrels are herbivores and feed primarily on seeds, fruits, buds, and flowers gathered from trees; insects and fungi are also eaten more sporadically. Foraging occurs both on the ground and in tree canopies. Food hoarding focuses on thick-shelled fruit such as walnuts. Japanese walnut (Juglans ailantifolia) is a particularly important food in lowland mixed-species forests. The Japanese squirrel's feeding technique consists of opening the hard shell of walnuts by chewing along the crease of the shell, embedding its teeth into the cleft, and airing out the two parts before eating. This strategy seems to be efficient since it minimizes the time to finish eating an entire walnut. In certain areas, up to 35% of the Japanese squirrel's diet can come from walnuts. It is possible the resulting dispersion has affected the evolution of larger seed sizes among Japanese walnut populations where Japanese squirrels are present.

=== Reproduction ===
Japanese squirrels are polyestrous and go through two distinct reproductive pulses over the year, an initial one from February to March and a later one from May to June. Females undergo a single day of estrus, during which they are followed and courted by multiple males. After mating, gestation lasts for 39 to 40 days, followed by the birth of a litter of two to six young are born within a leaf nest or den cavity. The young are weaned within a few weeks and afterwards disperse from their natal area.

== Conservation ==
Hunting of Japanese squirrels has been illegal in Japan since 1994. At present, the main threats to the species are habitat loss, habitat fragmentation, and the degradation of forest quality due to disease.
