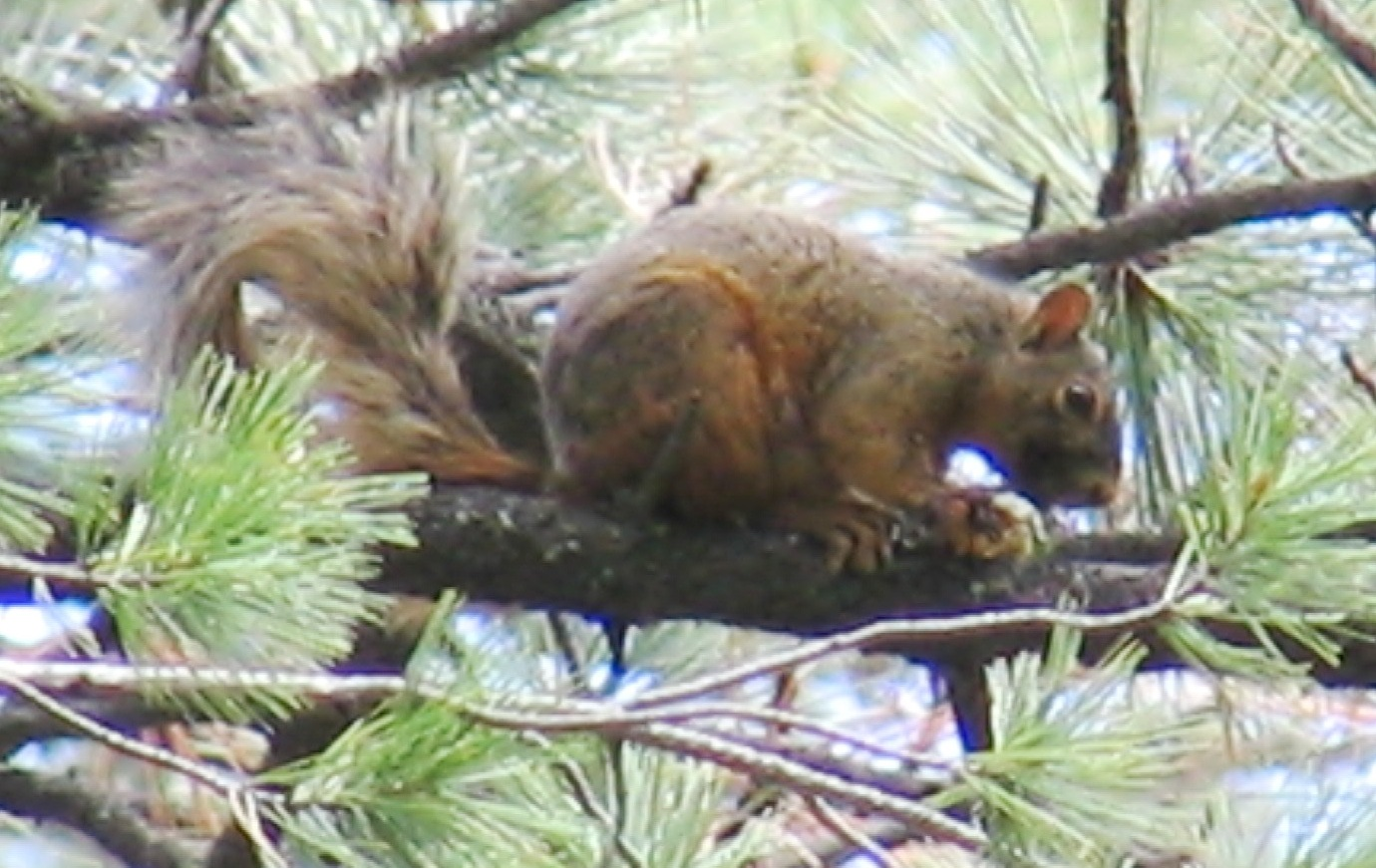

Conservation status
- Least Concern (IUCN 3.1)

- Secure (NatureServe)

Scientific classification
- Kingdom: Animalia
- Phylum: Chordata
- Class: Mammalia
- Order: Rodentia
- Family: Sciuridae
- Genus: Sciurus
- Species: S. nayaritensis

Binomial name
- Sciurus nayaritensis J. A. Allen, 1890

Subspecies
- S. n. nayaritensis - Nayarit fox squirrel; S. n. apache - Apache fox squirrel; S. n. chiricahuae - Chiricahua fox squirrel
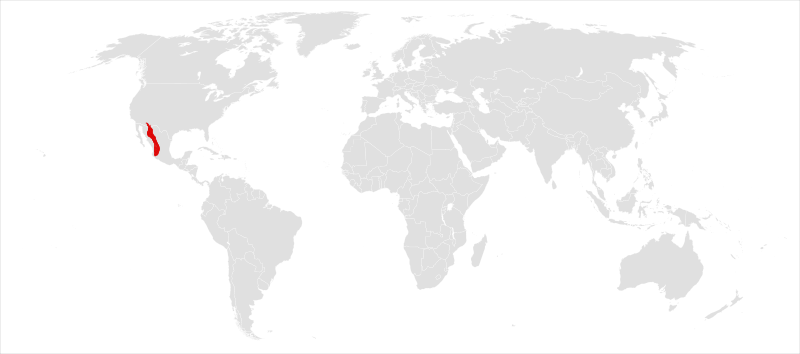
- Mexican fox squirrel's range

= Mexican fox squirrel =

Species of rodent

The Mexican fox squirrel (Sciurus nayaritensis) is a species of tree squirrel found throughout the Sierra Madre Occidental of Mexico as far south as Jalisco — and northward into the Chiricahua Mountains of southeastern Arizona, U.S.

This species, or its subspecies, is sometimes called the Nayarit, Apache, or Chiricahua fox squirrel. It has been evaluated as an IUCN Red List Least Concern species.

== Description ==
=== Physical ===
The Mexican fox squirrel has a grizzled brown back with a yellow to rufous underside, and a charcoal tail frosted with white. Two molts occur each year; the winter pelage is more rufous and the scrotum is often ringed with white. Mass is approximately 700 grams (25 oz).

=== Behavior ===
Mexican fox squirrels are diurnal, non-territorial, and do not hibernate during the winter months.

Food sources

The Mexican fox squirrel forages extensively on the ground and in the forest canopy for tree seeds, flowers, and fungi. Seeds from the cones from pine, Douglas fir, and true firs are extracted by removing individual cone scales. Acorns and walnuts are also eaten when available, along with a variety of other tree seeds, hypogeous and occasionally epigeous fungi, and insects. Mexican fox squirrels occasionally cache large seeds by scatter-hoarding them in leaf litter and topsoil.

The ecology of the Mexican fox squirrel has not been studied thoroughly, particularly outside the United States. Densities are often very low. Large raptors, canids, felids, procyonids and snakes are likely the major predators.

Mexican fox squirrels typically produce a single small litter of 1 or 2 young in late spring or summer. Mexican fox squirrels nest in ball-shaped dreys composed of sticks and leaves in trees; cavities within large trees are occasionally used, especially by nursing females. They are known to communally nest at times. Mexican fox squirrels are notably silent and appear to prefer to seek cover and remain motionless. If startled, they may bark and chuck from safe locations in trees.

== Habitat ==
Mexican fox squirrels are found in forests ranging from low elevation (~1,500 metres [ 4,900 ft ]) Madrean forests with a mixture of pine and oak to higher elevation mixed conifer forests < 2,700 metres [ 8,900 ft ]. Riparian areas with large cottonwoods and sycamores often harbor the highest densities. In the United States, the squirrel lives only in the Chiricahua Mountains of southeastern Arizona.

The Mexican fox squirrel inhabits forests that were historically maintained by frequent, low-severity fire, and uses areas with open understory and large trees that are typical of such forests.

== Subspecies ==
There are three subspecies:

- S. n. nayaritensis (Nayarit fox squirrel): southern portion of the distribution range. This is a smaller and more yellowish subspecies.
- S. n. apache (Apache fox squirrel): northern and central portion of the distribution range. This is a subspecies intermediate in size and color.
- S. n. chiricahuae (Chiricahua fox squirrel): an endemic subspecies of the Chiricahua Mountains of southeastern Arizona, U.S. Characterized as more reddish throughout.

== See also ==
- Fire ecology
- Sierra Madre Occidental pine-oak forests — ecoregion
