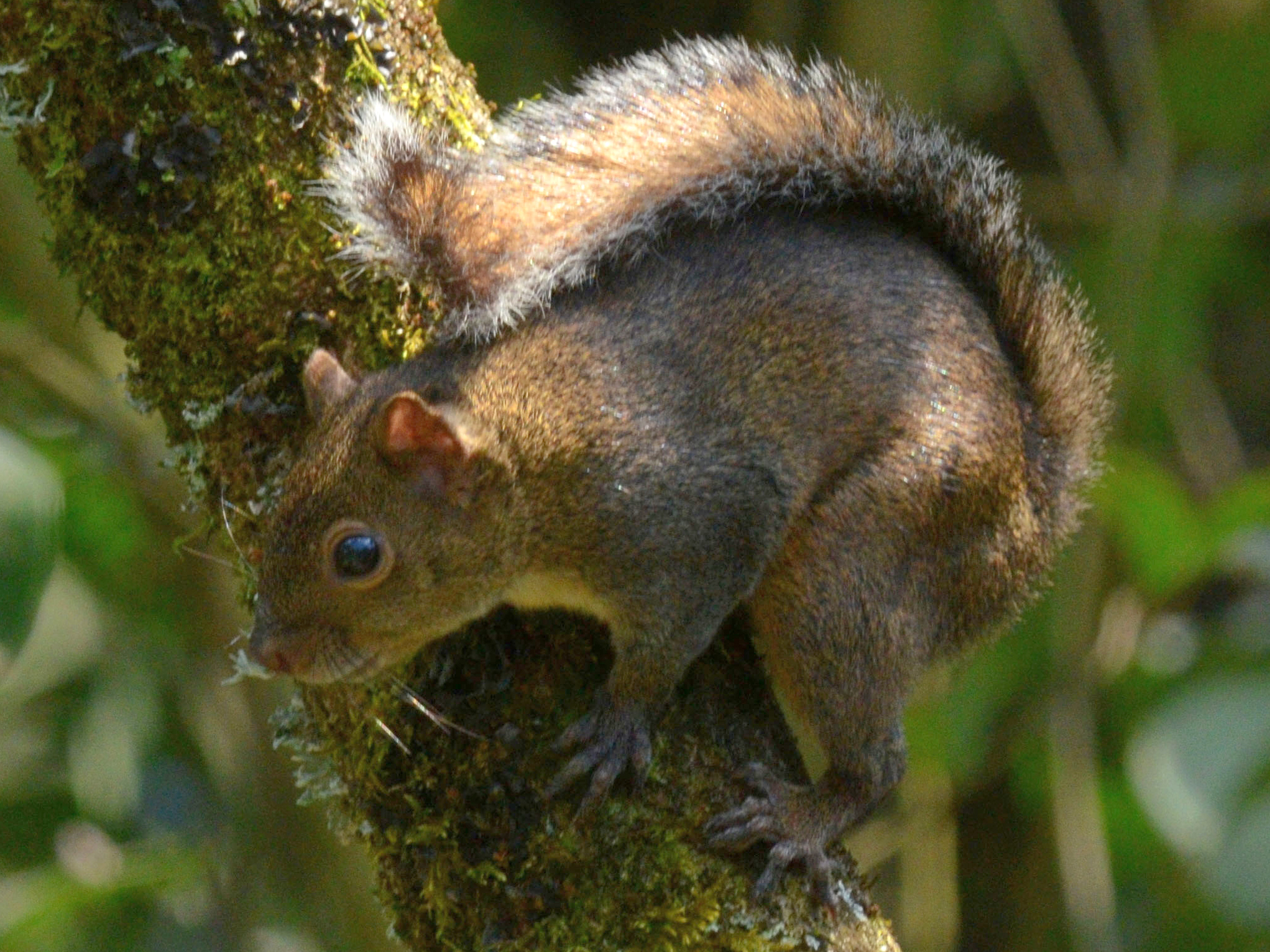

Conservation status
- Least Concern (IUCN 3.1)

Scientific classification
- Kingdom: Animalia
- Phylum: Chordata
- Class: Mammalia
- Order: Rodentia
- Family: Sciuridae
- Genus: Sciurus
- Species: S. deppei

Binomial name
- Sciurus deppei Peters, 1863

Subspecies
- S. d. deppei; S. d. matagalpae; S. d. miravallensis; S. d. negigens; S. d. vivax
- Deppe's squirrel range

= Deppe's squirrel =

Species of rodent

Deppe's squirrel (Sciurus deppei) is a species of tree squirrel in the genus Sciurus native to Belize, Costa Rica, El Salvador, Guatemala, Honduras, Mexico, and Nicaragua.

== Description ==
S. deppei varies in individual color. The overall color of the body is gray to yellowish brown or rusty-colored brown, while the face is gray. The legs are dark gray or rust colored. The top of the tail is black with a few white hairs mixed in while the bottom side of the tail is yellowish orange to a rust color, the hairs on the tip of the tail are white. Changes in their fur due to seasons aren't typically seen, except for the white tip on their tail and the patches of hair behind the ears disappear during the summer season.

Size varies a little bit in the Deppe's squirrel with the average female being around 287.3 g, HB 210.2 mm, and T 169.4 mm. The males average is 268.3 g, HB 207.2 mm, and T 176.0 mm. Both sexes are close in size, but the females tend to be slightly larger than the males.

== Distribution ==
The range of S. deppei overlaps with many other squirrel species. This includes areas of Mexico, Costa Rica, Guatemala and Chiapas. This area contains the Tikal National Park (in Guatemala) and populations of these squirrels can be seen around the Mayan ruins. Research has been done in this area to see if the impact of humans would affect the population of animals in these high tourists areas and it was found that higher populations of S. deppei were seen around the ruins than in a controlled area. According to IUCN the population of S. deppei is stable.

=== Habitat ===
Sciurus deppei is said to be a "habitat generalist." This species tends to favor lowland areas with damp tropical forests with dense vegetation. Due to being found in Mesoamerica and having a very diverse range of climates these squirrels can be found in different habitats. Looking at the skulls of S. deppei it is clear that they would inhabit these areas.

== Behavior ==
S. deppei is diurnal and is very active during the day. It is arboreal, but spends 30-60% of its foraging time on the ground. When on the ground they are searching for food including seeds, nuts, buds, insects, and fruits. These squirrels are not considered social and stay in very small groups. They are relatively quiet unless they have intruders in their area and then their high-pitched call can be heard including flicks of their tails. Since they are so quiet and their color helps them to blend into the tree trunks and hide from humans. When they aren't moving their camouflage is so good they are very hard to spot.

=== Reproduction ===
Sciurus deppei can reproduce year round, but is usually seen around the end of the dry season. Their litter size can vary quite a bit from 2-8 young, but usually on average has around 4.

Most Sciurus have 4 pairs of mammae, but S. deppei only has 3 functional pairs of mammae. Note that according to the generic key by de Vivo & Carmignotto in 2015, this characteristic would place this taxon in the genus Notosciurus along with the red-tailed squirrel, Andean squirrel, and likely Richmond's squirrel.
