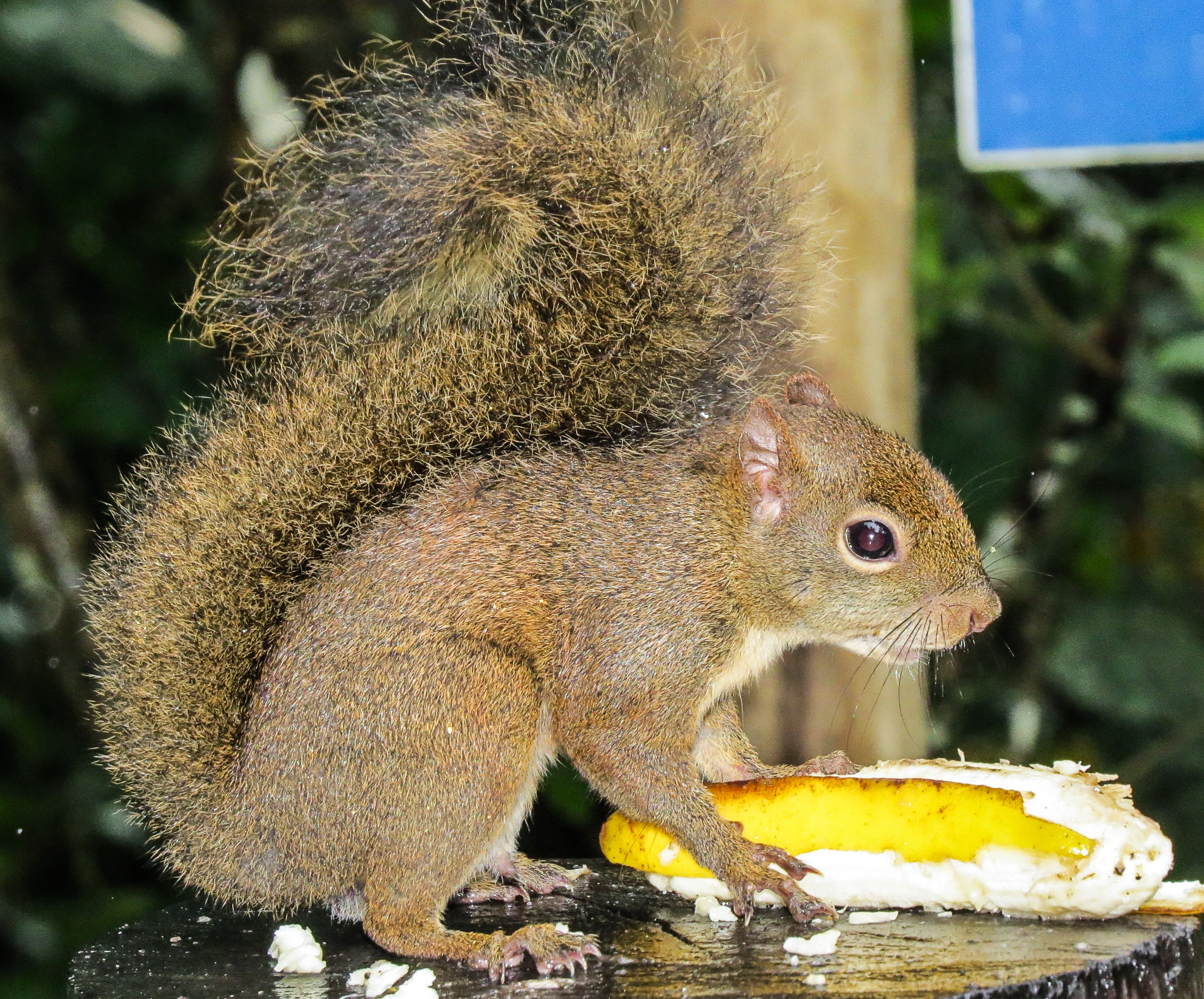

Conservation status
- Least Concern (IUCN 3.1)

Scientific classification
- Kingdom: Animalia
- Phylum: Chordata
- Class: Mammalia
- Order: Rodentia
- Family: Sciuridae
- Genus: Sciurus
- Species: S. aestuans

Binomial name
- Sciurus aestuans Linnaeus, 1766

Subspecies
- S. a. aestuans; S. a. alphonsei; S. a. garbei; S. a. georgihernandezi; S. a. henseli; S. a. ingrami; S. a. macconnelli; S. a. poaiae; S. a. quelchii; S. a. venustus
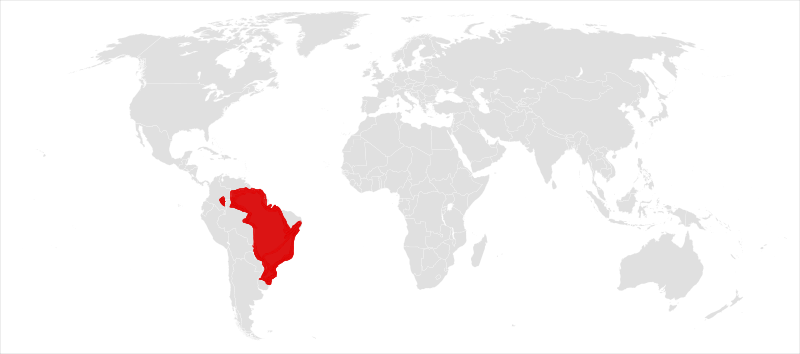
- Brazilian squirrel's range

= Brazilian squirrel =

Species of mammal in the family Sciuridae

The Brazilian squirrel (Sciurus aestuans), or Guianan squirrel, is a species of tree squirrel endemic to South America. It is found in south-eastern Colombia, Brazil, Guyana, French Guiana, Suriname and Venezuela.

== Description ==
Brazilian squirrels have primarily olive-gray fur with brown or yellow grizzling. The eye is surrounded by a pale yellow-brown ring, and a pale yellow postauricular patch is sometimes present. The belly is paler than the rest of the body, typically white, cream, buff, or pale yellow. The overside of the tail is the same color as the main body, while the underside is typically reddish and more variable.

The typical head and body length is 160–186 millimetres (6.3–7.3 in), with the tail comprising another 162–250 millimetres (6.4–9.8 in). Body mass is typically 160–380 grams (5.6–13.4 oz).

== Distribution and habitat ==
The Brazilian squirrel inhabits forested regions through most of Brazil, alongside Guyana, Suriname, French Guiana, and parts of Colombia, Venezuela, and Argentina.

Brazilian squirrels inhabit tropical rainforests, swamps and wet forests, and gallery forests. They can also be found in urban parks, gardens, and plantations.

== Ecology and behavior ==
Brazilian squirrels are diurnal. They are active at all levels of the forest but tend to be most frequent in the understory level, between 5–12 metres (16–39 ft) above the ground.

Brazilian squirrels are not strongly territorial, and there is considerable overlap between their foraging ranges. Male ranges tend to be around twice the size of females'.

Brazilian squirrels feed primarily on palm nuts, alongside acorns and other tree and shrub seeds. Distinct handling behaviors are used for distinct palm species' fruit in order to access their endosperm; this behavior is learned as juveniles.

Males track females by scent, culminating in several males chasing a female through the canopy to mate. Females have been observed pregnant in winter and summer, suggesting two distinct breeding seasons.

Observed predators of Brazilian squirrels include ocelots, margays, and Cebus monkeys. When alarmed, Brazilian squirrels run into trees to hide, sometimes chattering an alarm call.
