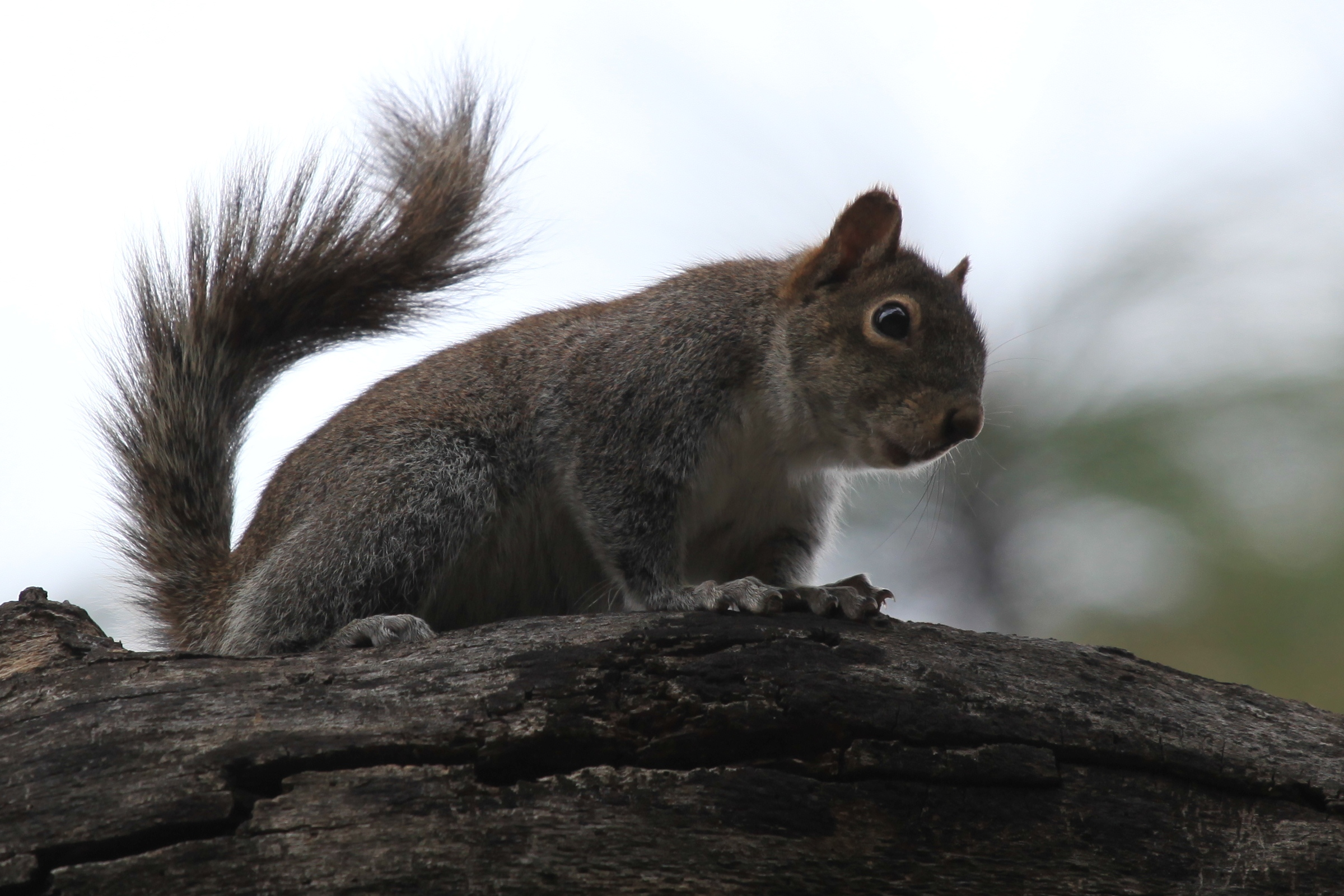

Conservation status
- Least Concern (IUCN 3.1)

Scientific classification
- Kingdom: Animalia
- Phylum: Chordata
- Class: Mammalia
- Order: Rodentia
- Family: Sciuridae
- Genus: Sciurus
- Species: S. alleni

Binomial name
- Sciurus alleni E. W. Nelson, 1898
- Allen's squirrel range

= Allen's squirrel =

Species of rodent

Allen's squirrel (Sciurus alleni) is a tree squirrel in the genus Sciurus endemic to northern Mexico. It has no recognised subspecies.

== Description ==
Allen's squirrels are yellow-brown overall, grizzled with black and grey, with darker heads and lighter sides and legs. A white to buff ring surrounds the eye. The tail is black, sometimes touched with buff or yellow, and frosted white. Melanism is sometimes observed.

Females tend to have larger body mass than males. Outside of this, the species is not sexually dimorphic. The typical head and body length is 220–254 millimetres (8.7–10.0 in), with the tail comprising another 217–247 millimetres (8.5–9.7 in). Male body mass is typically 290–491 grains (0.66–1.12 oz), while female body mass it typically 345–510 grains (0.79–1.17 oz).

== Distribution and habitat ==
Allen's squirrel lives in northeastern Mexico. Its natural range covers southeastern Coahuila, central Nuevo León, and western Tamaulipas, extending south to the extreme north of San Luis Potosí.

Allen's squirrel primarily inhabits oak and oak-pine montane forests. It has also been recorded in other mountain forest ecosystems, such as pecan forests in Tamaulipas and in pine-cedar and pine-fir-aspen woods in Cohauila. Its range sometimes extends into similar ecosystems in lowland areas.

== Ecology and behavior ==
Allen's squirrels are diurnal, and forage year-round in tree canopies and on the ground. Nests are made from leaves and twigs among tree branches or within natural cavities in trees. Pregnancies have been observed in all seasons.

Allen's squirrel is herbivorous and primarily feeds on tree seeds and fruit; insects and insect larvae also make up a frequent source of food. They occasionally also consume cultivated plants and frogs.

== Interactions with humans ==
Allen's squirrels are an occasional agricultural pest, and will feed on cultivated plants including peanuts, maize, oats, tomatoes, grapes, apples, peaches, mangoes, and plums. They can cause particularly damage to cornfields by eating ripening crops. In turn, logging and the clearing of forest for agriculture are the primary ecological threats to the species.
