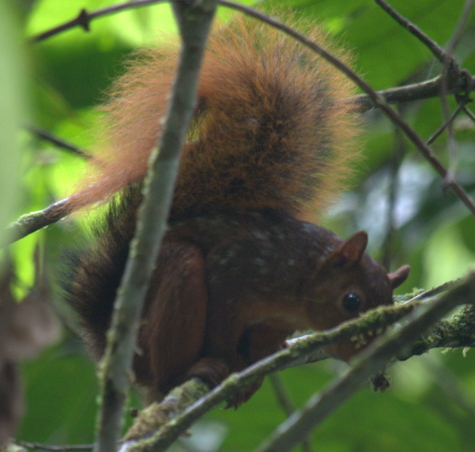

Conservation status
- Data Deficient (IUCN 3.1)

Scientific classification
- Kingdom: Animalia
- Phylum: Chordata
- Class: Mammalia
- Infraclass: Placentalia
- Order: Rodentia
- Family: Sciuridae
- Genus: Sciurus
- Species: S. pyrrhinus

Binomial name
- Sciurus pyrrhinus Thomas, 1898
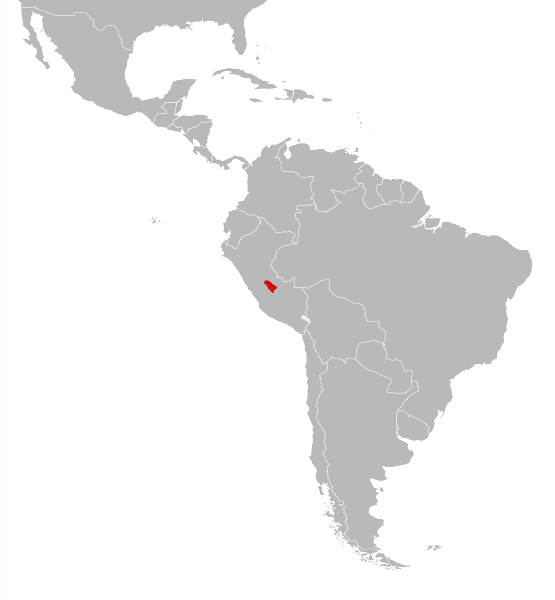
- Junín red squirrel's range

= Junín red squirrel =

Species of rodent

The Junín red squirrel (Sciurus pyrrhinus) is a species of squirrel from Peru and Ecuador.

== Description ==
The Junín red squirrel is a relatively large tree squirrel, having a head-body length of about 25 cm (9.8 in). The majority of the body is covered in dark red fur, grizzled with black, fading to a chestnut brown on the tail, which is slightly shorter than the combined head and body. The underparts vary in colour between individuals, being white, red, or some shade in between. The whiskers and the edges of the ears are black.

== Distribution and biology ==
The squirrel is known to inhabit the eastern slopes of the Andes in central Peru, from Huánuco in the north to Ayacucho and Cusco in the south, although it may also live further east, perhaps as far as the Bolivian border, and further north, with one specimen collected in 1920 known from Zamora-Chinchipe Province of Ecuador. Within this region it inhabits both lowland rainforests and higher, montane, forests.

Little is known about the biology and behavior of the squirrels. They are diurnal and arboreal, often seen in small groups, suggesting a lack of strong territoriality. Lactating females, presumably nursing young, have been observed in January. They are believed to be relatively numerous and more tolerant of human activities like logging and hunting compared to some other squirrel species. However, their limited range has led to their classification as “Vulnerable” by the Peruvian Ministry of the Environment.
