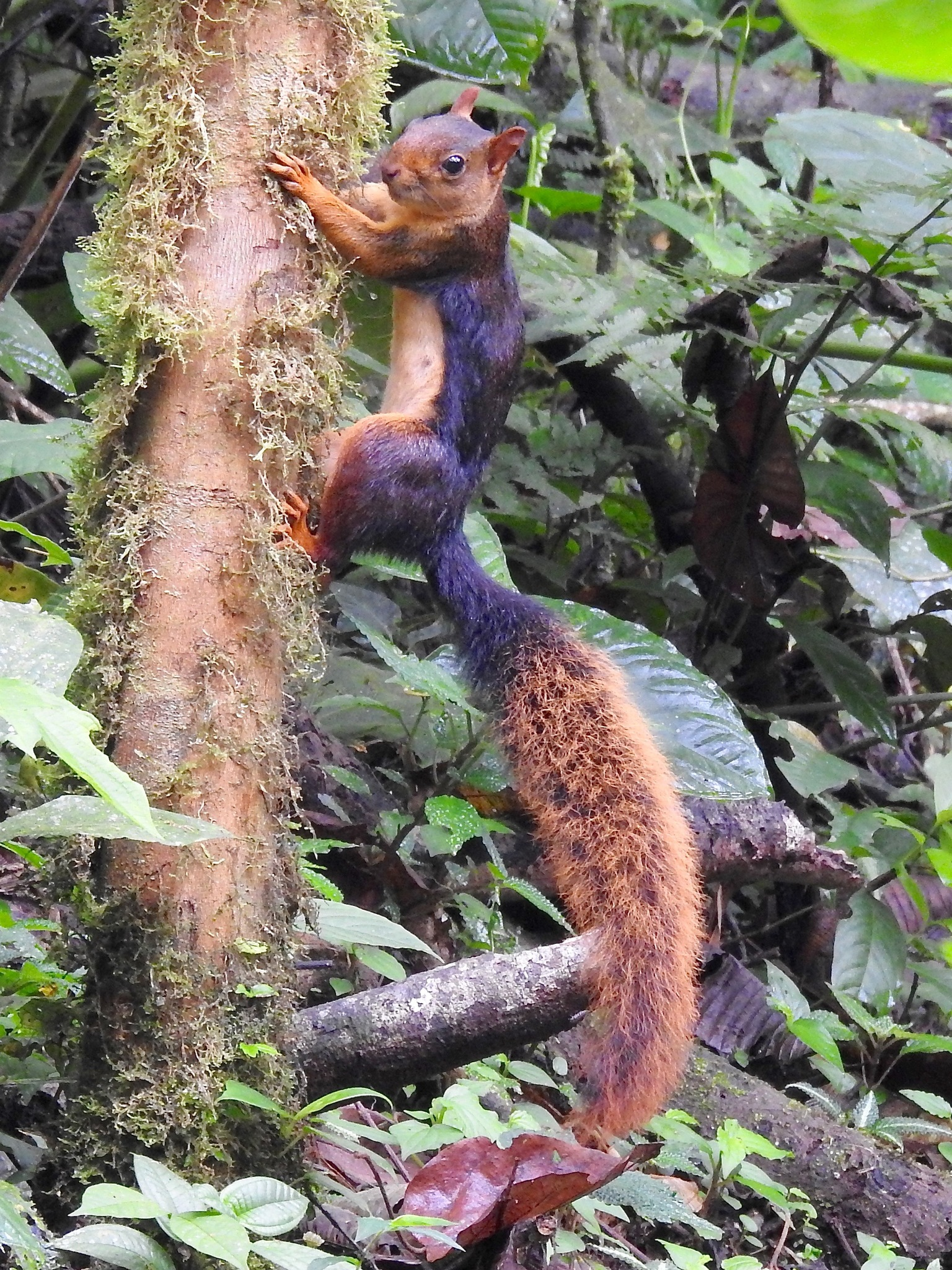
- Sumaco Napo-Galeras National Park, Ecuador

Conservation status
- Least Concern (IUCN 3.1)

Scientific classification
- Kingdom: Animalia
- Phylum: Chordata
- Class: Mammalia
- Infraclass: Placentalia
- Order: Rodentia
- Family: Sciuridae
- Genus: Sciurus
- Species: S. igniventris

Binomial name
- Sciurus igniventris Wagner, 1842

Subspecies
- S. i. igniventris; S. i. cocalis

= Northern Amazon red squirrel =

Species of rodent

The northern Amazon red squirrel (Sciurus igniventris) is a species of squirrel from South America. It occurs in Brazil, Colombia, Ecuador, Peru and Venezuela. It is widespread across its distribution and inhabits lowland forests, preferring a diet of nuts with especially thick shells. It is considered a least-concern species by the International Union for Conservation of Nature, though it is hunted for food in Ecuador and Peru and may be subject to habitat fragmentation from human logging activities.

== Taxonomy ==
The firey squirrel (Scurius flammifer) is thought to be a junior synonym of the Northern Amazon red squirrel, although further investigation has been recommended to solidify these species' synonymy.

Two subspecies are recognized:

- S. i. igniventris — Occurs in Venezuela, Brazil, and eastern Peru. Body fur is ocher-red, belly fur is rust-colored.
- S. i. cocalis — Colombia, Ecuador, and northern Peru. This form tends to have a black band running from head to tail. Belly is pale ochre-buff.

== Appearance ==
Northern Amazon red squirrels are dark red to rusty orange, with black grizzling. The paws are bright red or orange. The belly fur is a light orange, red, or white, contrasting sharply with the darker dorsal fur. A black line sometimes separates the ventral and dorsal colors. The tail is very bushy, with a black base and rusty or orange fur at the far end.

== Ecology and behavior ==
Northern Amazon red squirrels are diurnal, and primarily inhabit mature rainforests. They are specialist eaters of large seeds with thick, hard endocarps, especially palm nuts, although insects are also eaten. Foraging is done at all levels of the canopy, often near palm trees; approximately 10% of this time is spent on the ground, and open areas are mostly avoided.

When startled, Amazon red squirrels flee rapidly along the ground. The species is mostly silent, but an alarm call of low-frequency "chatters" or "chucks" is made when alarmed.

== Interactions with humans ==
Northern Amazon red squirrels are sporadically hunted for food. In some areas their meat is highly valued, while in others they are rarely hunted. They are sometimes captured for sale as exotic pets.
