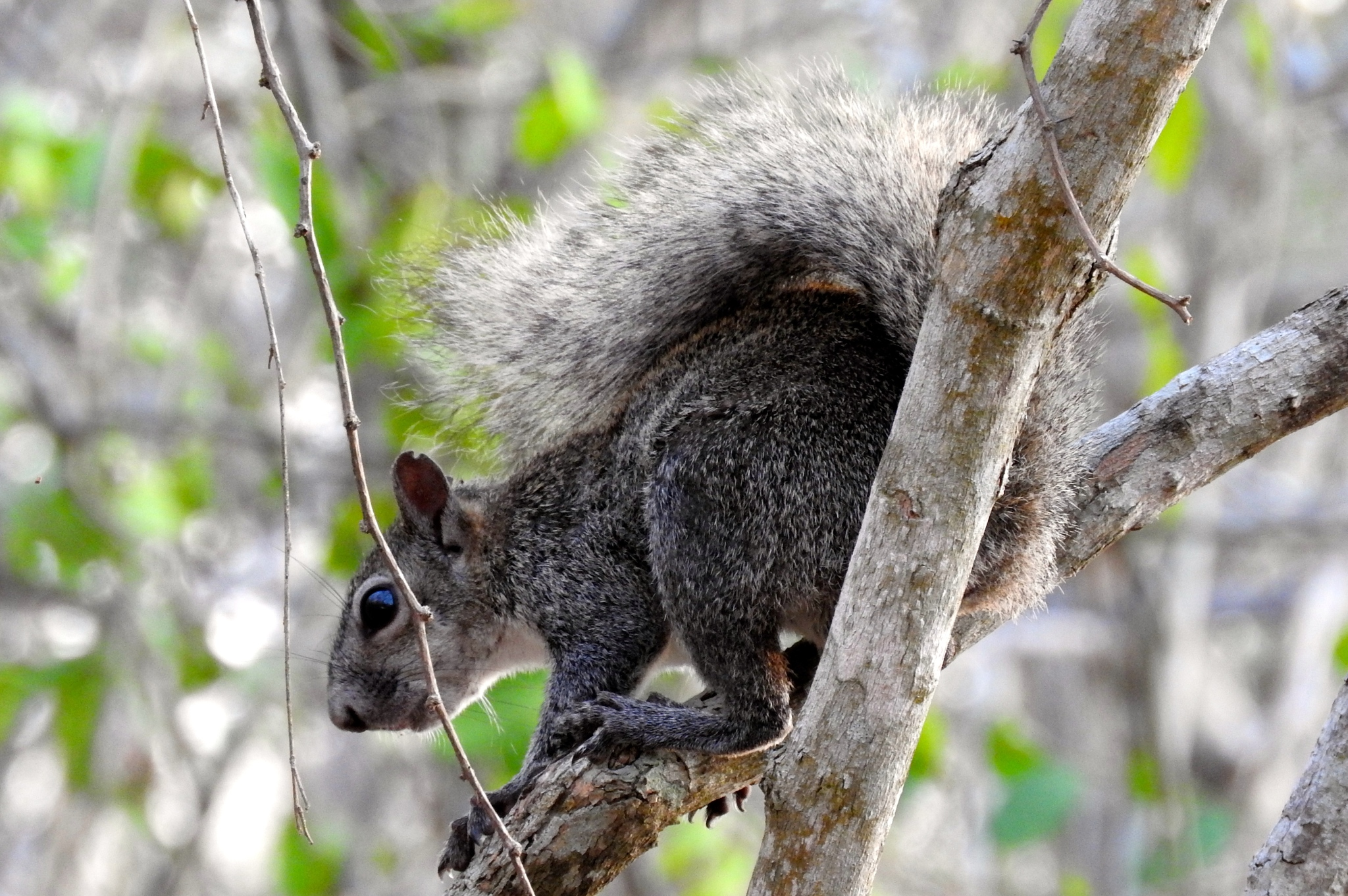
- In Sinaloa, Mexico

Conservation status
- Least Concern (IUCN 3.1)

Scientific classification
- Kingdom: Animalia
- Phylum: Chordata
- Class: Mammalia
- Infraclass: Placentalia
- Order: Rodentia
- Family: Sciuridae
- Genus: Sciurus
- Species: S. colliaei

Binomial name
- Sciurus colliaei Richardson, 1839
- Collie's squirrel range

= Collie's squirrel =

Species of rodent

Collie's squirrel (Sciurus colliaei) is a tree squirrel in the genus Sciurus endemic to Mexico.

== Distribution ==
The Collie's squirrel is native to the western coast of Mexico, including the states of Sonora, Chihuahua, Sinaloa, Durango, Nayarit, Jalisco, and Colima. The species inhabits areas of thick tropical and subtropical vegetation, especially in Jalisco. It is also known to occupy subtropical canyons in the northern part of its range.

== Description ==
Sometimes referred to as a "gray squirrel" in Mexico, the Collie's squirrel is a medium-sized squirrel with a gray coat. The back (dorsum) is usually a darker gray with a yellowish wash down to the tail's base. The species sides are usually a light gray and the underside is typically white, although it can sometimes be a light orange color. The top of the tail, except for the base, is black with a wash of white. The underside of the tail is gray and the sides are white.

Recorded measurements of the Collie's squirrel show that female specimens average 243.4 mm from head to the base of the tail, with a tail length of 260.4 mm. Males average 248.6 mm from head to the base of the tail, with a tail length of 243.2 mm. Females were recorded as weighing 440.8 g, while males averaged 335.2 g.

== Behaviour ==
The Collie's squirrel lives chiefly in trees and is diurnal, most active just after sunrise and before sunset. They have been reported to nest on outer tree branches and within tree trunks' cavities, as well as abandoned termite nests. It is believed that the species breed in March and April.

=== Diet ===
Collie's squirrels have a specialized diet of the fruits and nuts of palms, figs, and possibly oaks.
