= List of mammals of New Mexico =

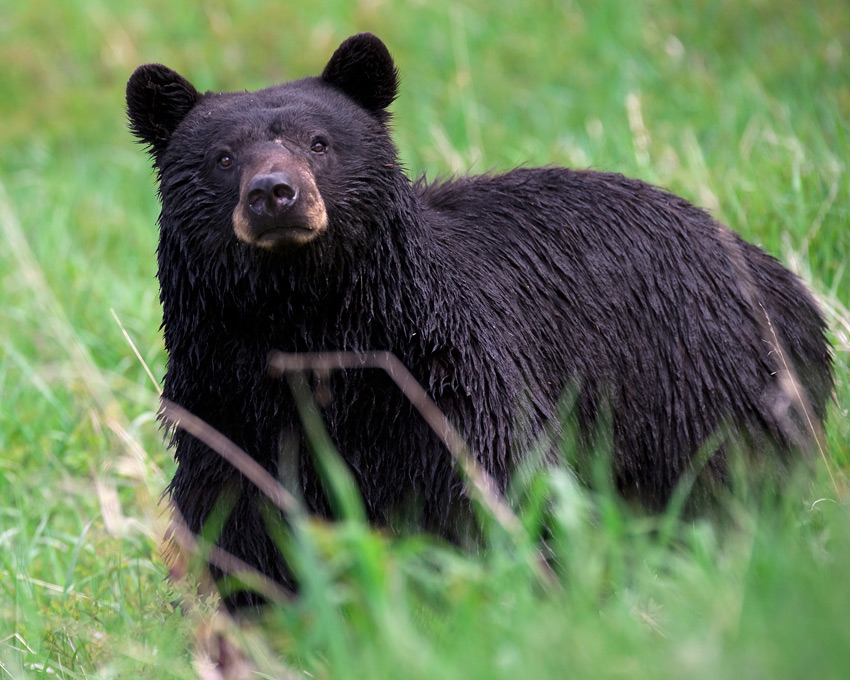
The American black bear is the state mammal of New Mexico.

This is a list of mammals in New Mexico. It includes mammals extirpated from New Mexico and species introduced into the state. A total of 169 mammals are listed.

== Opossums (order: Didelphimorphia) ==
Family: Didelphidae

- Virginia opossum, Didelphis virginiana

== Armadillos (order: Cingulata) ==
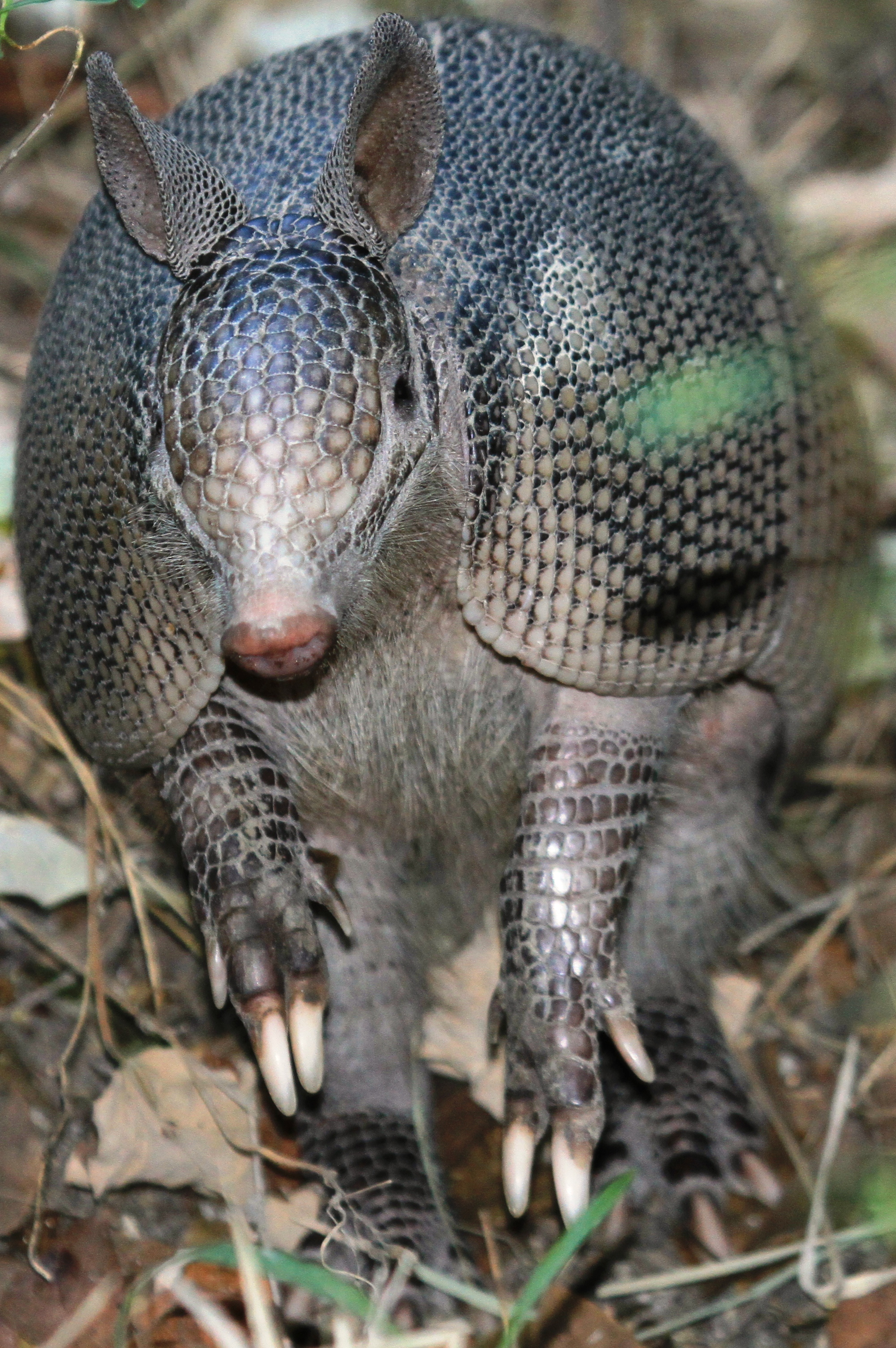
Nine-banded armadillo

Family: Dasypodidae

- Nine-banded armadillo, Dasypus novemcinctus

== Shrews (order: Eulipotyphla) ==
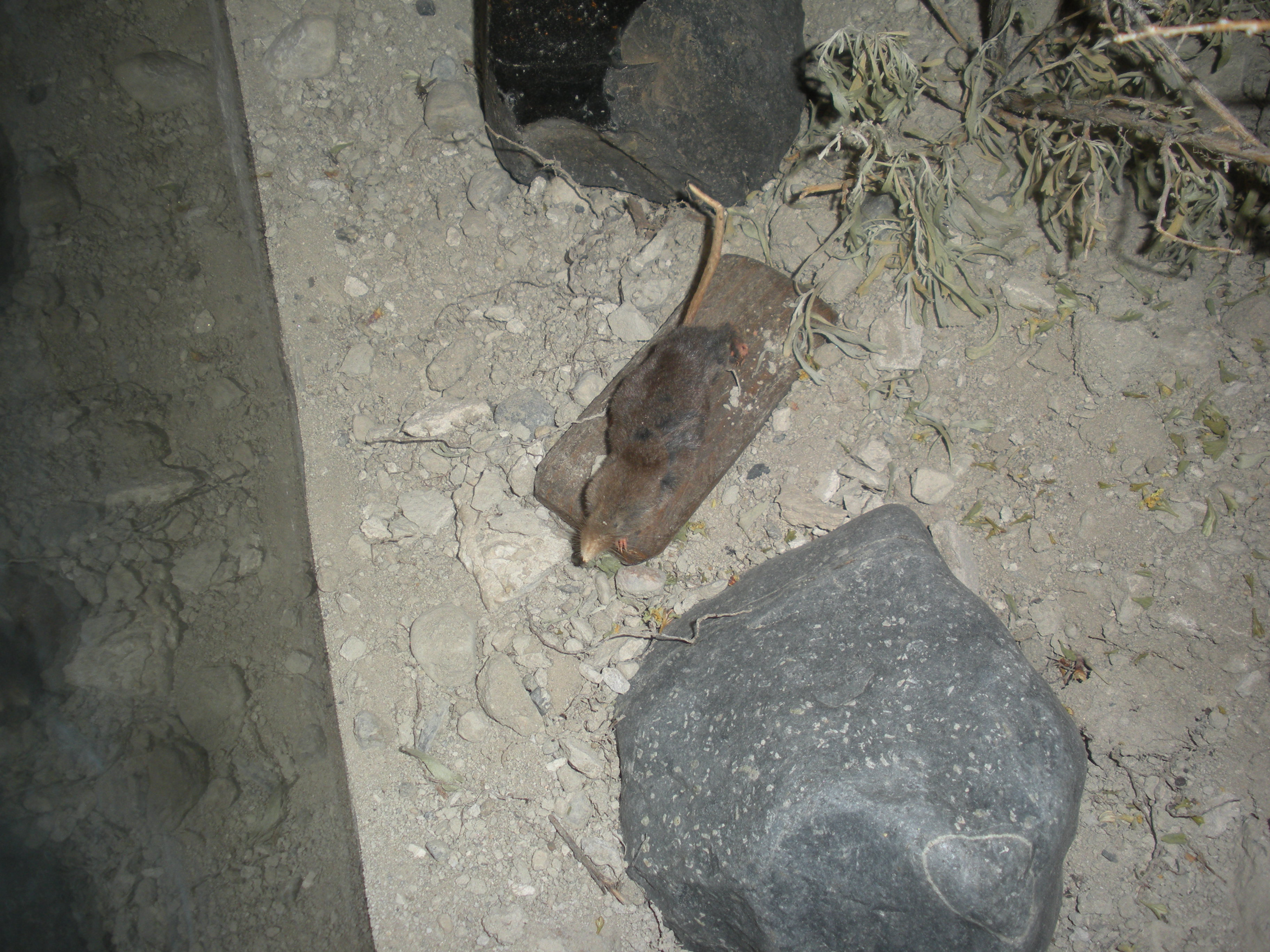
Merriam's shrew

Family: Soricidae

- North American least shrew, Cryptotis parva
- Crawford's gray shrew, Notiosorex crawfordi
- Arizona shrew, Sorex arizonae
- Cinereus shrew, Sorex cinereus
- Merriam's shrew, Sorex merriami
- Montane shrew, Sorex monticolus
- New Mexico shrew, Sorex neomexicanus
- American water shrew, Sorex palustris
- Preble's shrew, Sorex preblei

== Bats (order: Chiroptera) ==
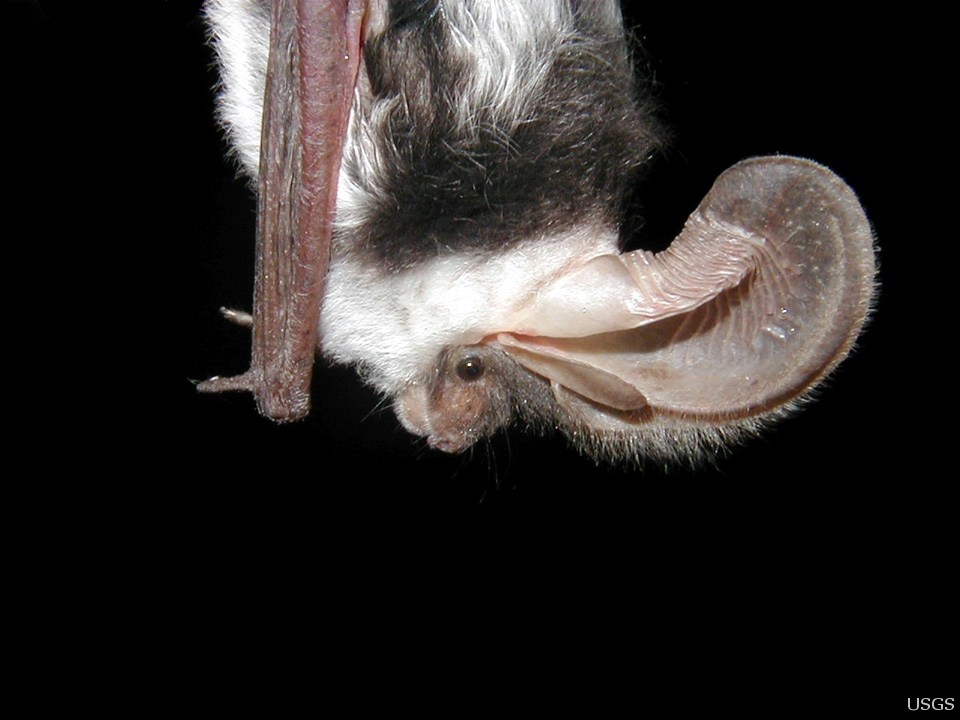
Spotted bat

Family: Molossidae

- Western mastiff bat, Eumops perotis
- Pocketed free-tailed bat, Nyctinomops femorosaccus
- Big free-tailed bat, Nyctinomops macrotis
- Mexican free-tailed bat, Tadarida brasiliensis

Family: Phyllostomidae

- Mexican long-tongued bat, Choeronycteris mexicana
- Greater long-nosed bat, Leptonycteris nivalis

Family: Vespertilionidae

- Hoary bat, Aeorestes cinereus
- Pallid bat, Antrozous pallidus
- Townsend's big-eared bat, Corynorhinus townsendii
- Big brown bat, Eptesicus fuscus
- Spotted bat, Euderma maculatum
- Allen's big-eared bat, Idionycteris phyllotis
- Silver-haired bat, Lasionycteris noctivagans
- Western red bat, Lasiurus blossevillii
- Eastern red bat, Lasiurus borealis
- Western yellow bat, Lasiurus xanthinus
- Southwestern myotis, Myotis auriculus
- California myotis, Myotis californicus
- Western small-footed myotis, Myotis ciliolabrum
- Long-eared myotis, Myotis evotis
- Little brown bat, Myotis lucifugus
- Arizona myotis, Myotis occultus
- Fringed myotis, Myotis thysanodes
- Long-legged myotis, Myotis yumanensis
- Western pipistrelle, Pipistrellus hersperus
- Eastern pipistrelle, Pipistrellus subflavus

== Lagomorphs (order: Lagomorpha) ==
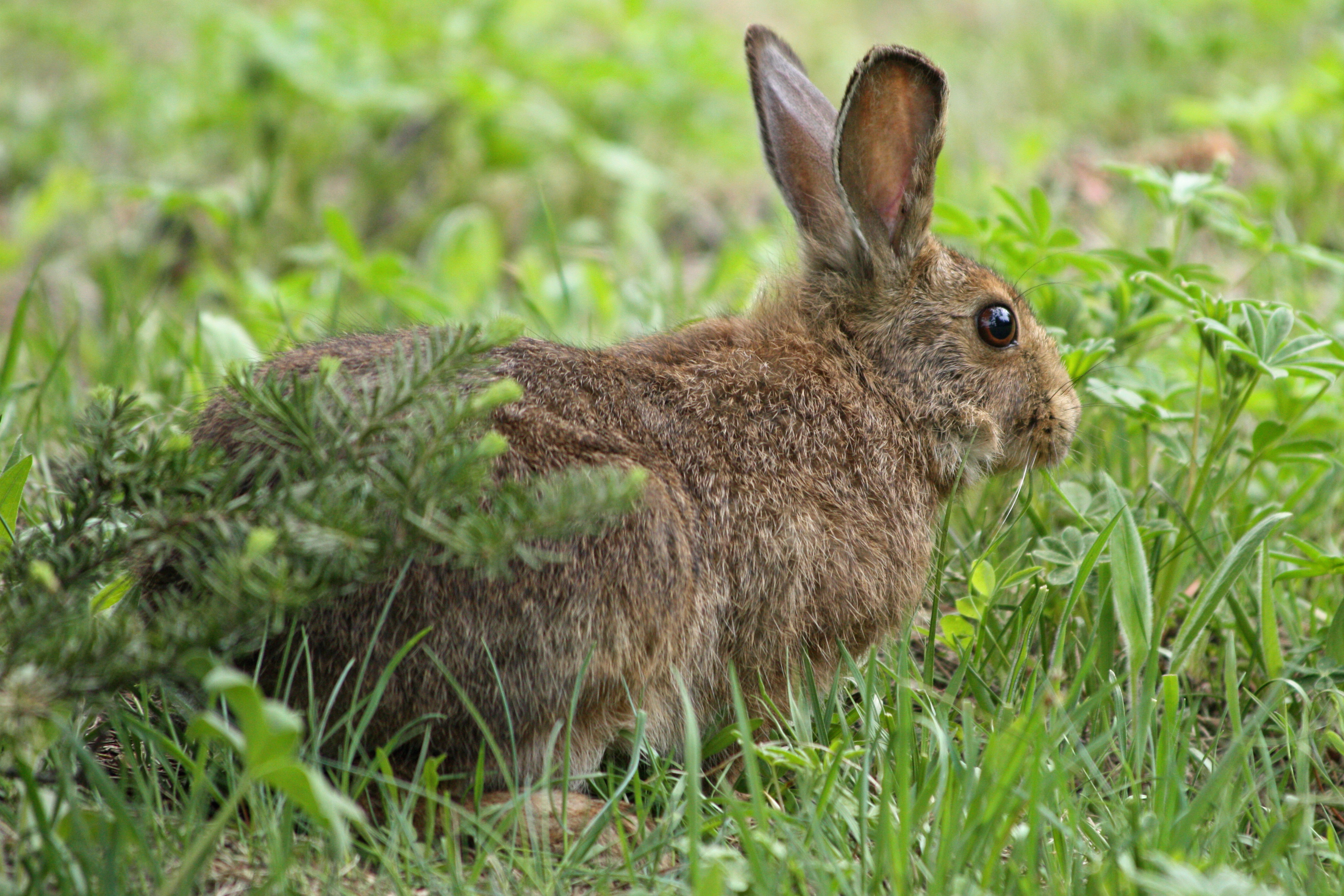
Snowshoe hare

Family: Leporidae

- Snowshoe hare, Lepus americanus
- Black-tailed jackrabbit, Lepus californicus
- White-sided jackrabbit, Lepus callotis
- White-tailed jackrabbit, Lepus townsendii
- Desert cottontail, Sylvilagus audubonii
- Eastern cottontail, Sylvilagus floridanus
- Robust cottontail, Sylvilagus holzneri
- Mountain cottontail, Sylvilagus nuttallii

Family: Ochotonidae

- American pika, Ochotona princeps

== Rodents (order: Rodentia) ==
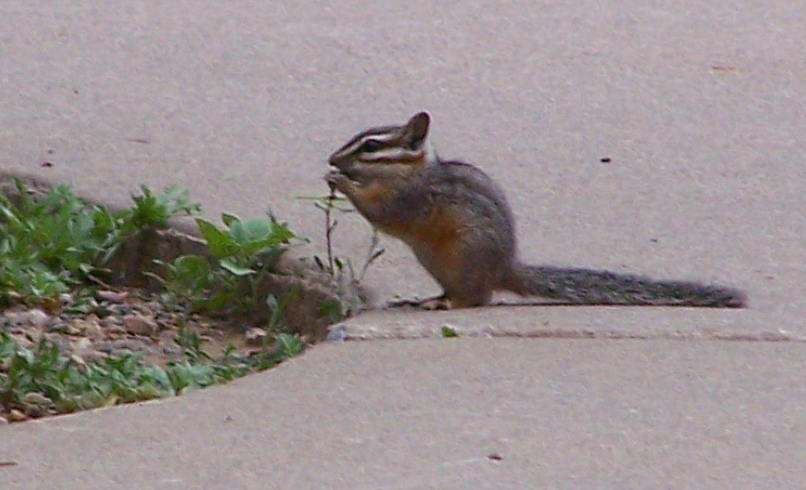
Cliff chipmunk

Family: Castoridae

- American beaver, Castor canadensis

Family: Geomyidae

- Yellow-faced pocket gopher, Cratogeomys castanops
- Desert pocket gopher, Geomys arenarius
- Plains pocket gopher, Geomys bursarius
- Knox Jones's pocket gopher, Geomys knoxjonesi
- Botta's pocket gopher, Thomomys bottae
- Northern pocket gopher, Thomomys talpoides
- Southern pocket gopher, Thomomys umbrinus

Family: Heteromyidae

- Bailey's pocket mouse, Chaetodipus balieyi
- Chihuahuan pocket mouse, Chaetodipus eremicus
- Hispid pocket mouse, Chaetodipus hispidus
- Rock pocket mouse, Chaetodipus intermedius
- Nelson's pocket mouse, Chaetodipus nelsoni
- Desert pocket mouse, Chaetodipus penicillatus
- Merriam's kangaroo rat, Dipodomys merriamii
- Ord's kangaroo rat, Dipodomys ordii
- Banner-tailed kangaroo rat, Dipodomys spectabilis
- Plains pocket mouse, Perognathus flavescens
- Silky pocket mouse, Perognathus flavus
- Merriam's pocket mouse, Perognathus merriami

Family: Cricetidae

- Northern pygmy mouse, Baiomys taylori
- Long-tailed vole, Microtus longicadus
- Mogollon vole, Microtus mogollonenis
- Montane vole, Microtus montanus
- Prairie vole, Microtus ochrogaster
- Meadow vole, Microtus pennsylvanicus
- Southern red-backed vole, Myodes gapperi
- White-throated woodrat, Neotoma albigula
- Bushy-tailed woodrat, Neotoma cinerea
- White-toothed woodrat, Neotoma leucodon
- Mexican woodrat, Neotoma mexicana
- Southern plains woodrat, Neotoma micropus
- Stephen's woodrat, Neotoma stephensi
- Common muskrat, Ondatra zibethicus
- Chihuahuan grasshopper mouse, Onychomys arenicola
- Northern grasshopper mouse, Onychomys leucogaster
- Southern grasshopper mouse, Onychomys torridus
- Brush deermouse, Peromyscus boylii
- Canyon deermouse, Peromyscus crinitus
- Cactus deermouse, Peromyscus eremicus
- Southern deermouse, Peromyscus labecula
- White-footed mouse, Peromyscus leucopus
- Northern rock mouse, Peromyscus nasutus
- White-ankled mouse, Peromyscus pectoralis
- Western deermouse, Peromyscus sonoriensis
- Pinyon mouse, Peromyscus truei
- Western heather vole, Phenacomys intermedius
- Fulvous harvest mouse, Reithrodontomys fulvescens
- Western harvest mouse, Reithrodontomys megalotis
- Plains harvest mouse, Reithrodontomys montanus
- Arizona cotton rat, Sigmodon arizonae
- Tawny-bellied cotton rat, Sigmodon fulviventer
- Hispid cotton rat, Sigmodon hispidus
- Yellow-nosed cotton rat, Sigmodon ochrognathus

Family: Muridae

- House mouse, Mus musculus introduced
- Norway rat, Rattus norvegicus introduced
- Black rat, Rattus rattus introduced

Family: Dipodidae

- Meadow jumping mouse, Zapus hudsonicus
- Western jumping mouse, Zapus princeps

Family: Erethizontidae

- North American porcupine, Erethizon dorsatum

Family: Echimyidae

- Coypu, Myocastor coypus introduced

Family: Sciuridae

- Harris's antelope squirrel, Ammospermophilus harrisii
- Texas antelope squirrel, Ammospermophilus interpres
- White-tailed antelope squirrel, Ammospermophilus leucurus
- Golden-mantled ground squirrel, Callospermophilus lateralis
- Gunnison's prairie dog, Cynomys gunnisoni
- Black-tailed prairie dog, Cynomys ludovicianus
- Mexican ground squirrel, Ictidomys mexicanus
- Thirteen-lined ground squirrel, Ictidomys tridecimlineatus
- Yellow-bellied marmot, Marmota flaviventris
- Gray-footed chipmunk, Neotamias canipes
- Gray-collared chipmunk, Neotamias cinereicollis
- Cliff chipmunk, Neotamias dorsalis
- Least chipmunk, Neotamias minimus
- Colorado chipmunk, Neotamias quadrivittatus
- Rock squirrel, Otospermophilus variegatus
- Abert's squirrel, Sciurus aberti
- Arizona gray squirrel, Sciurus arizonensis
- Fox squirrel, Sciurus niger
- Southwestern red squirrel, Tamiasciurus fremonti
- Spotted ground squirrel, Xerospermophilus spilosoma

== Carnivorans (order: Carnivora) ==
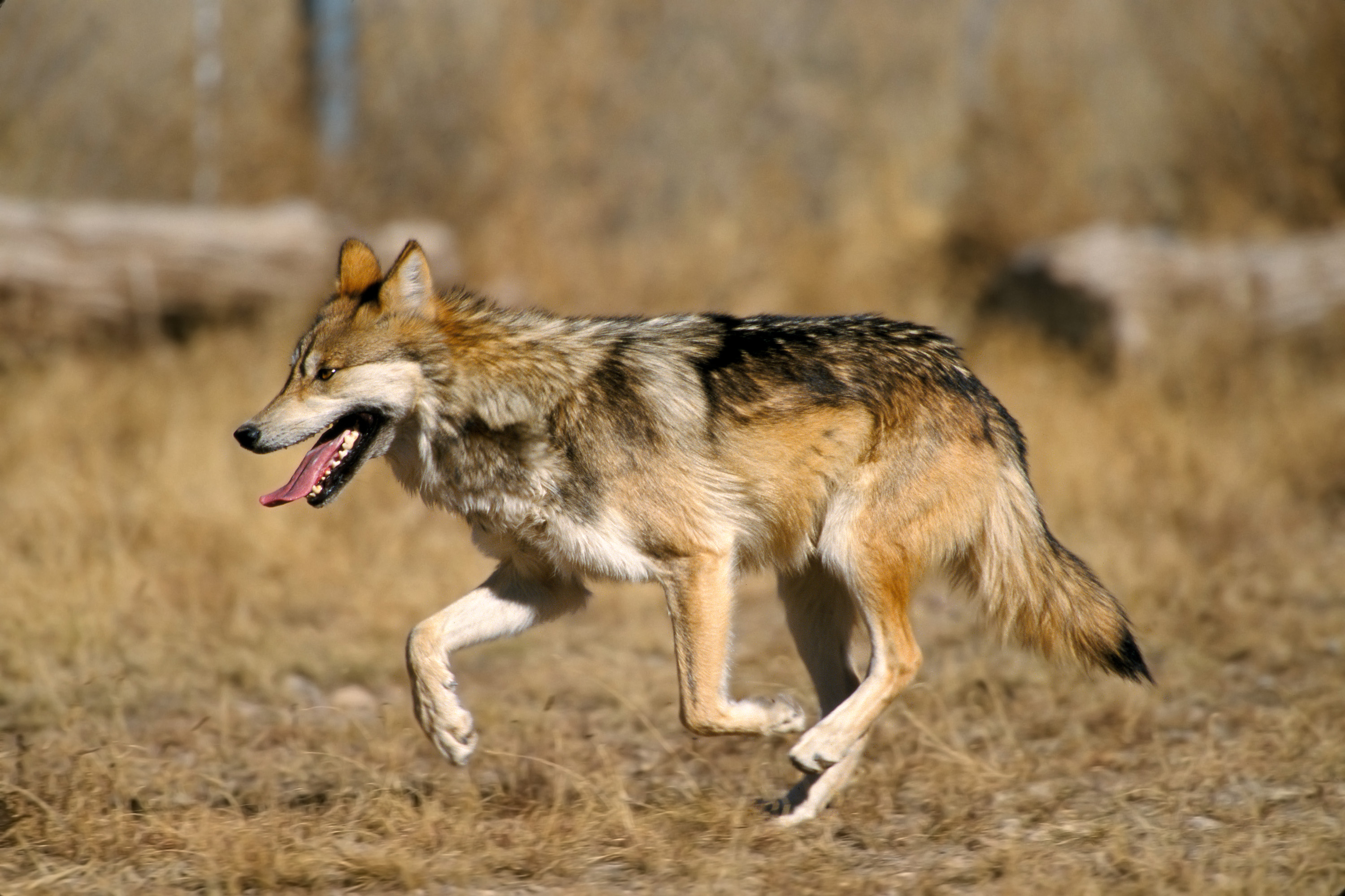
Mexican wolf

Family: Canidae

- Coyote, Canis latrans
- Gray wolf, Canis lupus reintroduced
  - Mexican wolf, C. l. baileyi reintroduced
  - Mogollon mountain wolf, C. l. mogollonensis EX
  - Texas wolf, C. l. monstrabilis EX
  - Great Plains wolf, C. l. nubilus EX
  - Southern Rocky Mountain wolf, C. l. youngi EX
- Gray fox, Urocyon cinereoargenteus
- Kit fox, Vulpes macrotis
- Swift fox, Vulpes velox
- Red fox, Vulpes vulpes

Family: Ursidae

- American black bear, Ursus americanus
- Brown bear, Ursus arctos extirpated
  - Grizzly bear, U. a. horribilis extirpated
  - Mexican grizzly bear, U. a. horribilis EX

Family: Procyonidae

- Ring-tailed cat, Bassariscus astutus
- White-nosed coati, Nasua narica
- Raccoon, Procyon lotor

Family: Mephitidae

- American hog-nosed skunk, Conepatus leuconotus
- Hooded skunk, Mephitis macroura
- Striped skunk, Mephitis mephitis
- Western spotted skunk, Spilogale gracilis

Family: Felidae

- Canada lynx, Lynx canadensis
- Bobcat, Lynx rufus
- Jaguar, Panthera onca vagrant
- Cougar, Puma concolor

Family: Mustelidae

- Wolverine, Gulo gulo extirpated
- North American river otter, Lontra canadensis reintroduced
- Pacific marten, Martes caurina
- Black-footed ferret, Mustela nigripes reintroduced
- American ermine, Mustela richardsonii
- Long-tailed weasel, Neogale frenata
- American mink, Neogale vison
- American badger, Taxidea taxus

== Even-toed ungulates (order: Artiodactyla) ==
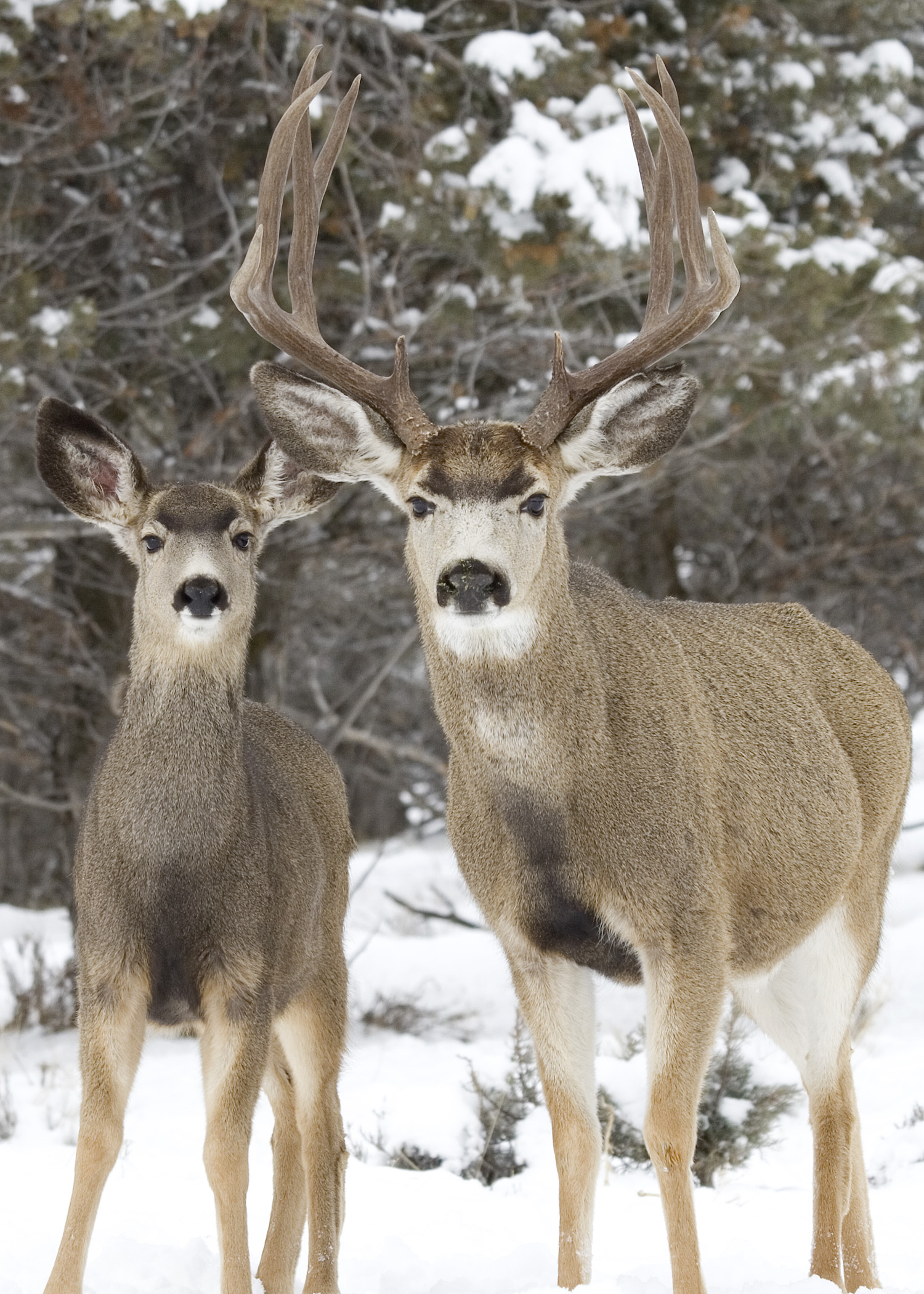
Mule deer

Family: Antilocapridae

- Pronghorn, Antilocapra americana

Family: Bovidae

- Barbary sheep, Ammotragus lervia introduced
- American bison, Bison bison reintroduced
  - Plains bison, B. b. bison reintroduced
- Wild goat, Capra aegagrus introduced
- Siberian ibex, Capra sibirica introduced
- Himalayan tahr, Hemitagus jemlahicus introduced
- Gemsbok, Oryx gazella introduced
- Bighorn sheep, Ovis canadensis
  - Desert bighorn sheep, O. c. nelsoni

Family: Cervidae

- Moose, Alces alces vagrant
- Elk, Cervus canadensis reintroduced
  - Merriam's elk, C. c. merriami EX
  - Rocky Mountain elk, C. c. nelsoni introduced
- Mule deer, Odocoileus hemionus
  - Desert mule deer, O. h. eremicus
  - Rocky Mountain mule deer, O. h. hemionus
- White-tailed deer, Odocoileus virginianius
  - Coues' deer, O. v. couesi

Family: Suidae

- Wild boar, Sus scrofa introduced

Family: Tayassuidae

- Collared peccary, Dicotyles tajacu
