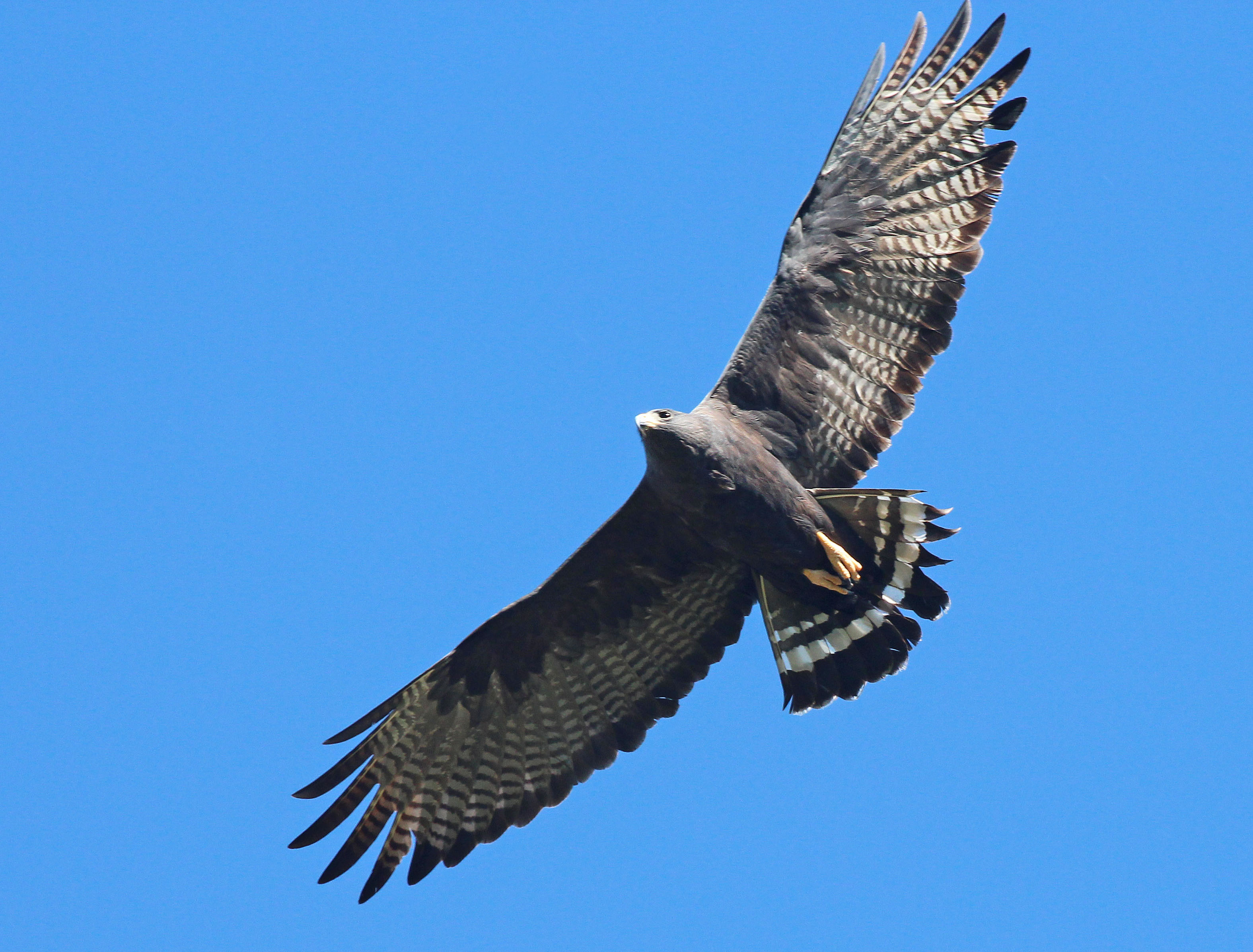

Conservation status
- Least Concern (IUCN 3.1)

Scientific classification
- Kingdom: Animalia
- Phylum: Chordata
- Class: Aves
- Order: Accipitriformes
- Family: Accipitridae
- Genus: Buteo
- Species: B. albonotatus

Binomial name
- Buteo albonotatus Kaup, 1847
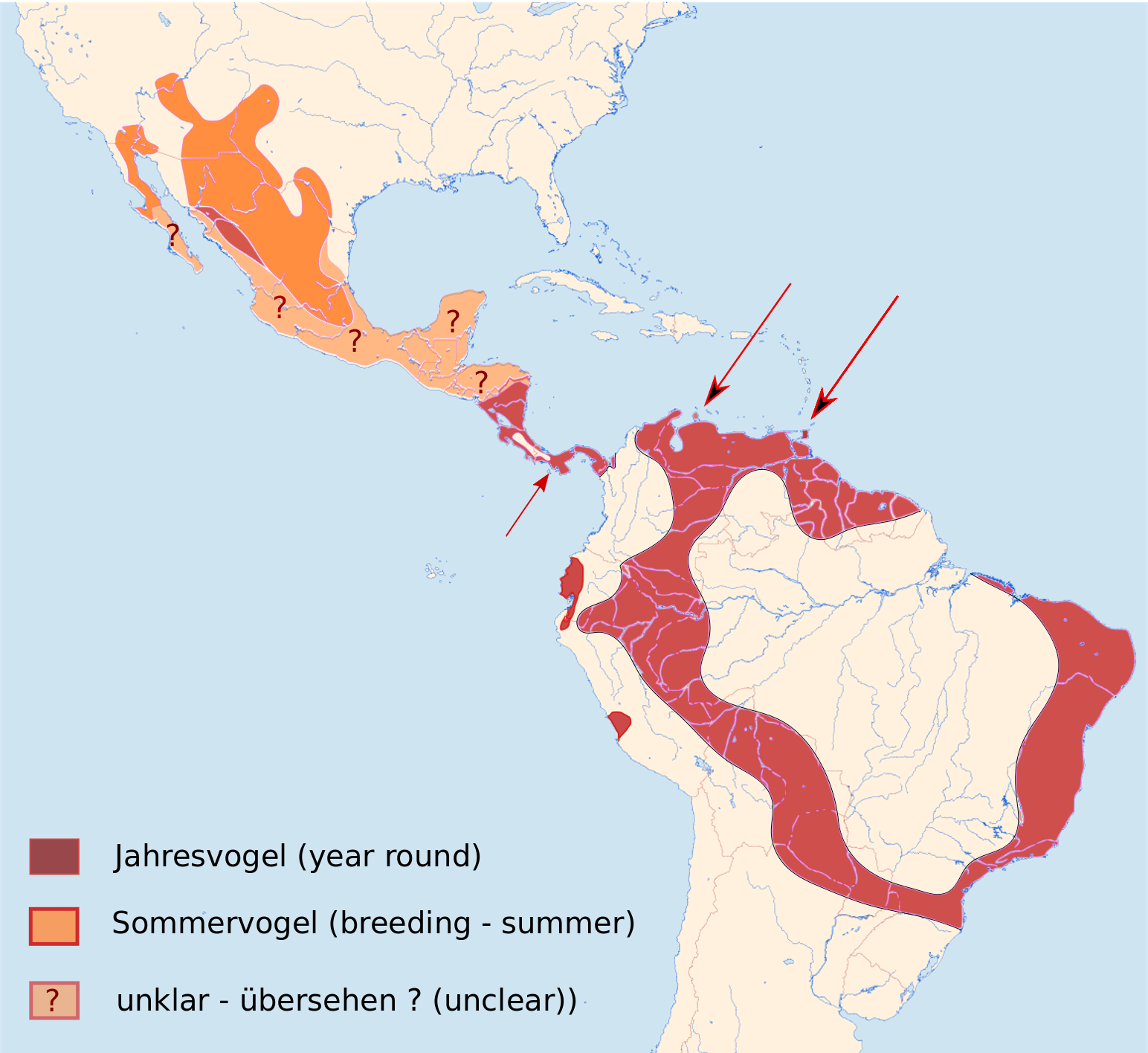

= Zone-tailed hawk =

Species of bird

The zone-tailed hawk (Buteo albonotatus) is a medium-sized hawk of warm, dry parts of the Americas. It is somewhat similar in plumage and flight style to a common scavenger, the turkey vulture, and may benefit from being able to blend into groups of vultures. It feeds on small terrestrial tetrapods of all kinds.

== Taxonomy ==
In 1844, the English zoologist George Robert Gray, in his List of the Specimens of Birds in the Collection of the British Museum, mentioned the zone-tailed hawk under the common name "white spotted buzzard" and coined the binomial name Buteo albonotatus. As Gray omitted a species description, his binomial name is considered nomen nudum, a naked name, and is not recognised. Instead, the German naturalist Johann Jakob Kaup is recognised as the authority as in 1847, he provided a brief description and used Gray's name Buteo albonotatus. The type locality is Mexico. The specific epithet albonotatus combines the Latin albus meaning "white" with notatus meaning "marked". The species is monotypic: no subspecies are recognised.

== Description ==
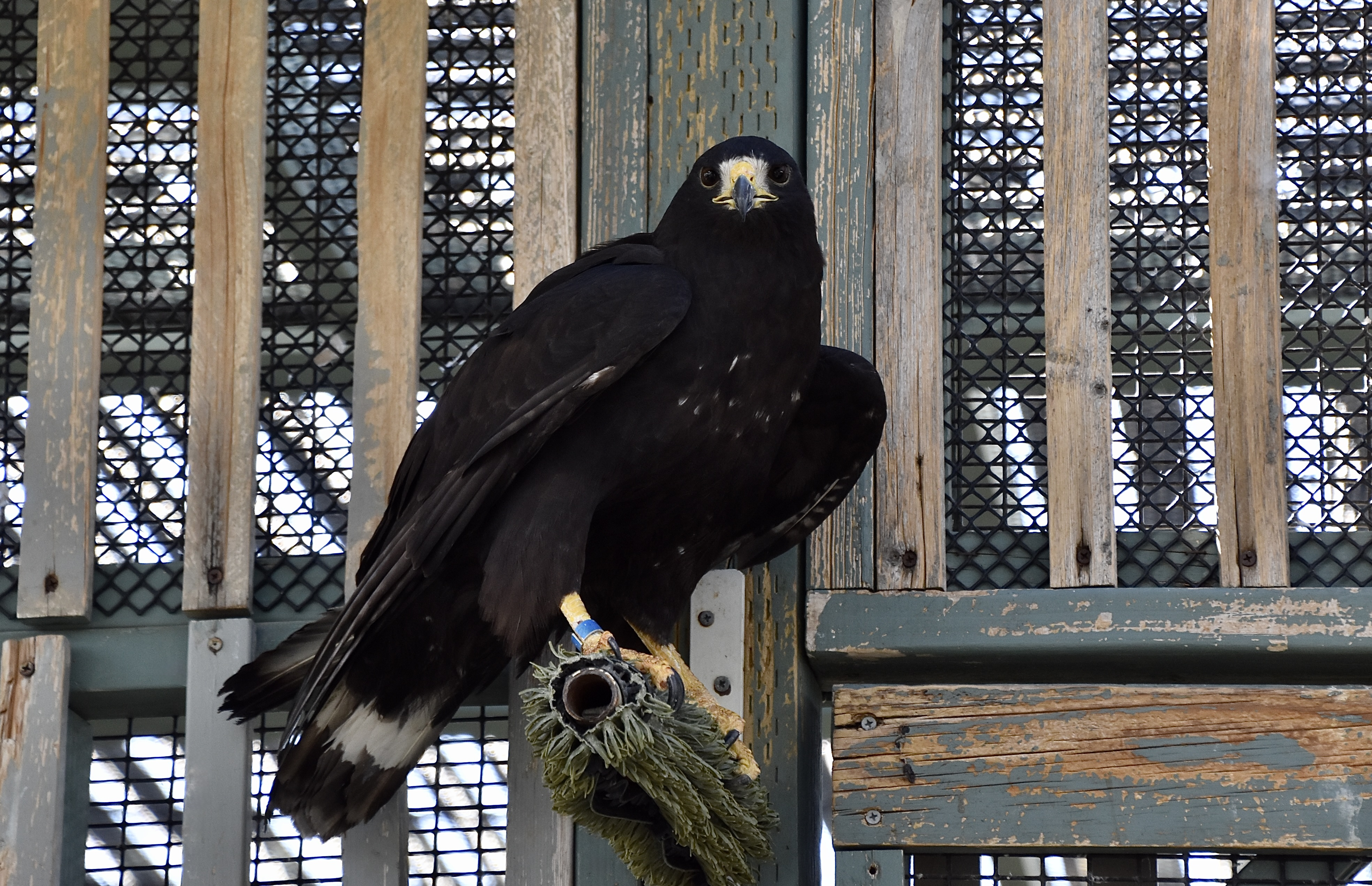
Being rehabilitated in a flight cage at Wild at Heart Raptors.

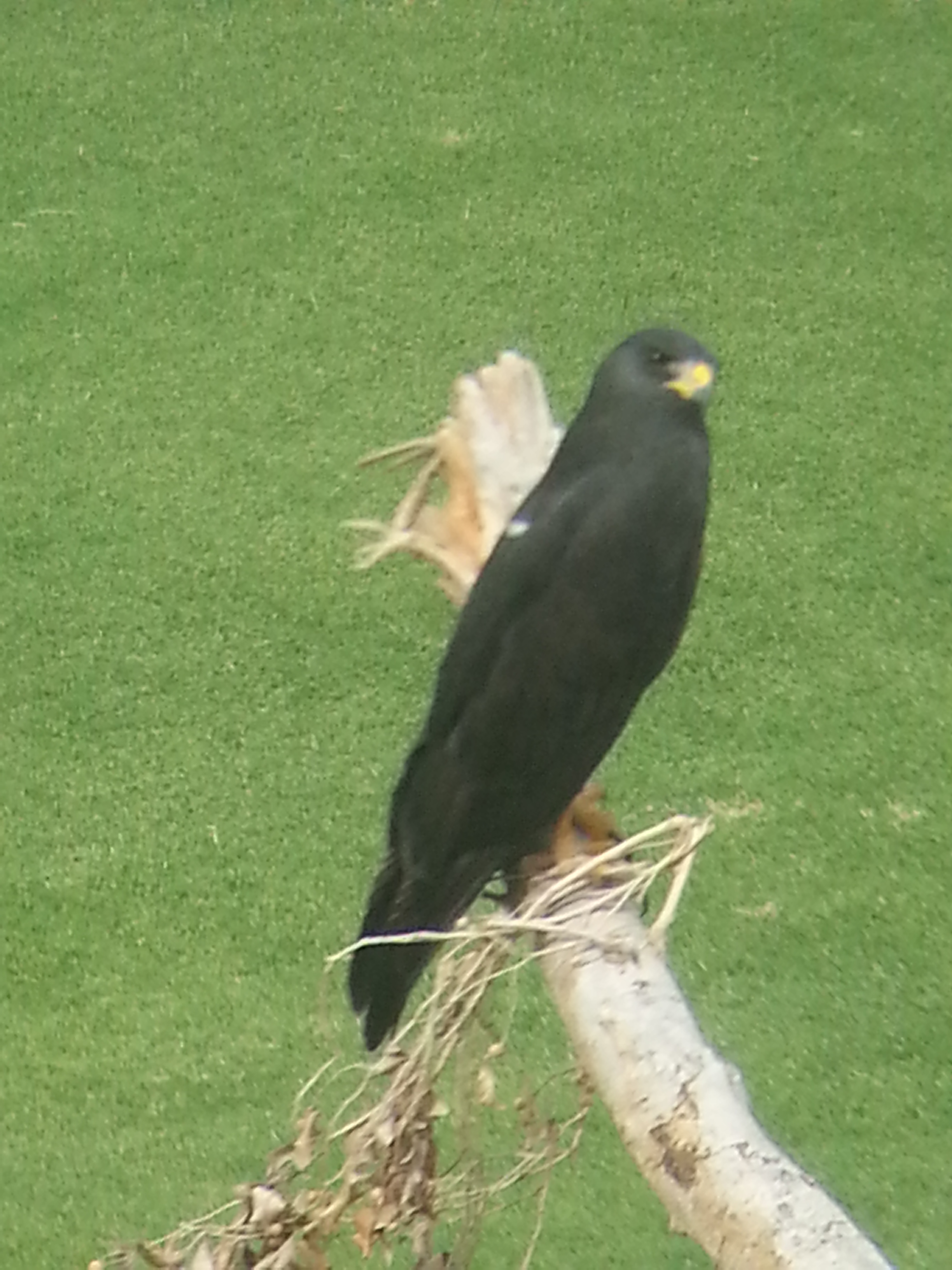
Zone-tailed hawk

The zone-tailed hawk is a fairly large but slender Buteo hawk. Grown birds are 46 to 56 cm (18 to 22 in) in length with a wingspan of about 117–140 cm (46–55 in). The zone-tailed is comparable in length and wingspan to common large Buteos found to the north such as Swainson's and red-tailed hawk, but may weigh considerably less. Their body mass can range from 565–1,080 g (1.246–2.381 lb). In measurements, the sexes are close in size, but the female, at an average of 900 g (2.0 lb), is much heavier and bulkier than the male, at an average of 637 g (1.404 lb). Among standard measurements, the wing chord is 36.5–46 cm (14.4–18.1 in), the fairly long tail is 19.4–23.5 cm (7.6–9.3 in) and the tarsus is 6.7–7.8 cm (2.6–3.1 in).

The adult plumage is mostly blackish. The notable exception is that the flight feathers are barred with lighter gray, which can appear solid silver-gray from a distance. The tail has three or four bands (the "zones" of the common name), white from below and light gray from above, of which the one second from the tip is particularly broad and conspicuous. The cere and legs are yellow, the lores are light gray and a light touch of white may be seen on the face. Immatures are similar except for small white spots on the breast and tails with narrow gray and black bands and a broad dark tip.

Adults resemble the common black hawk, but are distinctly more slender in flight and overall small, and they have more white bars on the tail. Other Buteo hawks in their dark phase, especially the broad-winged hawk, may appear similar but often have more silvery coloration on the wings and are broader-winged. Additionally, bird guides caution against confusing them with the much more common turkey vulture, but at a reasonable distance, one can distinguish them from vultures by their smaller size, the typical hawk shape of the wings and head, and the pale stripe on the tail.

The call is a loud scream, a somewhat typical Buteo call, dropping in pitch at the end, kra kree-kree-kree-kree. In at least some birds, there is an abrupt rise in pitch (like a break to a falsetto voice) in the middle and an equally abrupt drop back down. They are most often heard vocalizing when engaging in breeding displays at the beginning of the mating season. When disturbed at the nest, they may utter a long, lower-pitched raaaaauu.

== Distribution and habitat ==
Zone-tailed hawks range from parts of southern Arizona, New Mexico, and western Texas almost throughout inland Mexico and the central portions of Central America down into eastern Colombia, Ecuador, and more sporadically, into Peru, southern Brazil, Paraguay, Bolivia, and northern Argentina. In winter, they generally withdraw from the U.S. and northernmost Mexico, with these populations wintering mostly in Oaxaca and the Yucatán Peninsula. They are also native to the Caribbean island of Trinidad. The hawks of Central America may be seasonally migratory, although their movements are not well known. Zone-tails sometimes wander out of their normal range, and the bird was once recorded in Nova Scotia.

They can adapt to various habitats across their broad range, including both closed and open ones and wet and dry ones. Often, the largest numbers are found in rocky areas with access to water. They often reside in coniferous or pine-oak forests as well as timbered canyonland, hilly riverine woods, dry open boscage and scrub, humid forests, and overgrown marshes. They may forage over ranches and even semi-desert, but always need at least scattered tree thickets for nesting. Furthermore, they may be distributed in elevation from sea level to 3,000 m (9,800 ft), though are mainly found below 1,500 m (4,900 ft) in the north and 500 m (1,600 ft) in the southern reaches of the breeding range.

== Behaviour and ecology ==
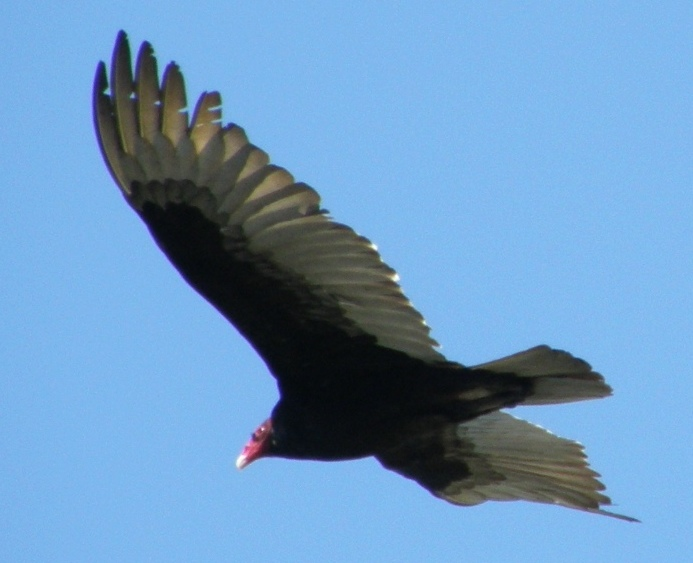
The zone-tailed hawk bears a superficial resemblance to the turkey vulture, pictured here in flight.

=== Breeding ===
The mating season of the species varies geographically but is almost always in the first half of the year. In the northern reaches of the range, the breeding season is mid-April through July, whereas in Trinidad and Ecuador, it is February through June. Eggs have been found as late as August in Colombia, implying only a loose breeding season in the true tropics. The mating pair performs a courtship display, which may include engaging in aerial loops, dives, and rolls with each other. The nest is typical of hawks: a big, bulky assemblage of sticks, lined with green leaves, usually built on the top or the main fork of a tree, in this case at 7.5 to 30 m (25 to 98 ft) above the ground. Typically, tall trees such as cottonwood or pine trees are selected, and the nest may be in the open or concealed by foliage. Occasionally, nests are found on cliffs.

The clutch comprises one to three, typically two, white eggs, often marked with brown. Incubation lasts for around 28 to 35 days and typically the female incubates, while being fed by the male, although the male may occasionally incubate. The young are semi-altricial at hatching and are covered in gray down. They grow slowly for the first 7 days of life and then considerably faster from 7 to 21 days old. As is common in raptors the older sibling often kills the younger one or outcompetes it for food; only occasionally do both survive to adulthood. The younger hatchling is sometimes referred to as the "spare" one since it may be tended to more directly if the first dies. The young fledge at 42 to 50 days, though are not typically self-assured fliers until around a week later. They may remain in their parents' care until the following breeding season, though in migratory populations, the young and adults often separate. There have been no extensive reports on longevity and mortality in the species.

=== Food and feeding ===
This hawk mainly preys on small birds and mammals (including bats, rats, mice, squirrels), but reptiles can be locally favored, including virtually any type of lizard, such as the common collared lizard, Yarrow's spiny lizard, the crevice spiny lizard, and the mesquite lizard. Among the rats preyed upon are the tawny-bellied cotton rat and the white-eared cotton rat. In the north, California quail, along with possibly other quail species, chipmunks, and other ground squirrels seemed to be the favorite prey. Other birds preyed upon include red-shafted flickers, acorn woodpeckers, eared quetzals, Steller's jays, yellow-rumped caciques, tropical kingbirds, and even eastern screech owls. Zone-tails also eat various young birds, having been observed preying on nestlings and fledglings of species as varied as herons and passerines. Zone-tailed hawks snatch young birds from trees or the ground without landing. Second-hand reports of predation on frogs, other amphibians, and fishes may be cases of misidentification of common black-hawks. Zone-tailed hawks are very active foragers, hunting almost exclusively by transects and random quartering in low flight at around 10–30 m (33–98 ft) over the ground. When approaching the prey, the hawk may try to use obstructing cover such as trees until it is within 0.5–2 m (1.6–6.6 ft) of the prey, an easy striking distance. Outside the breeding pair bond, these hawks are wholly solitary and are not known to hunt in pairs.

==== Mimicry ====
Zone-tailed hawks closely resemble turkey vultures. Both species are overall dark in plumage, have paler flight feathers that contrast with darker coverts, and have proportionally long wings and tail. Both species also soar with their wings held in a dihedral position (pointing slightly upwards) and rock from side to side while flying. Vultures can frequently be seen flying in groups (called "kettles"); zone-tailed hawks often mingle with them, adding to their disguise.

Unlike turkey vultures, which do not normally prey on live animals, zone-tailed hawks are active predators. Because of this, some ornithologists believe that the zone-tailed hawk's similarity to the turkey vulture is a form of aggressive mimicry that deceives potential prey into believing the hawk is not a threat. By mimicking turkey vultures, zone-tailed hawks may be able to approach potential prey items without causing them to flee.

Most species known to be preyed upon by zone-tailed hawks have good eyesight, which is consistent with the mimicry hypothesis. Additional evidence supporting the interpretation of the zone-tailed hawk as a mimic comes from the fact that zone-tailed hawks have higher success rates while hunting among turkey vultures compared to alone. Criticisms of the mimicry hypothesis include suggestions that the zone-tailed hawk may hold its wings in a dihedral not to mimic turkey vultures, but because doing so provides aerodynamic advantages, although other ornithologists have argued that these two hypotheses are not mutually exclusive.
