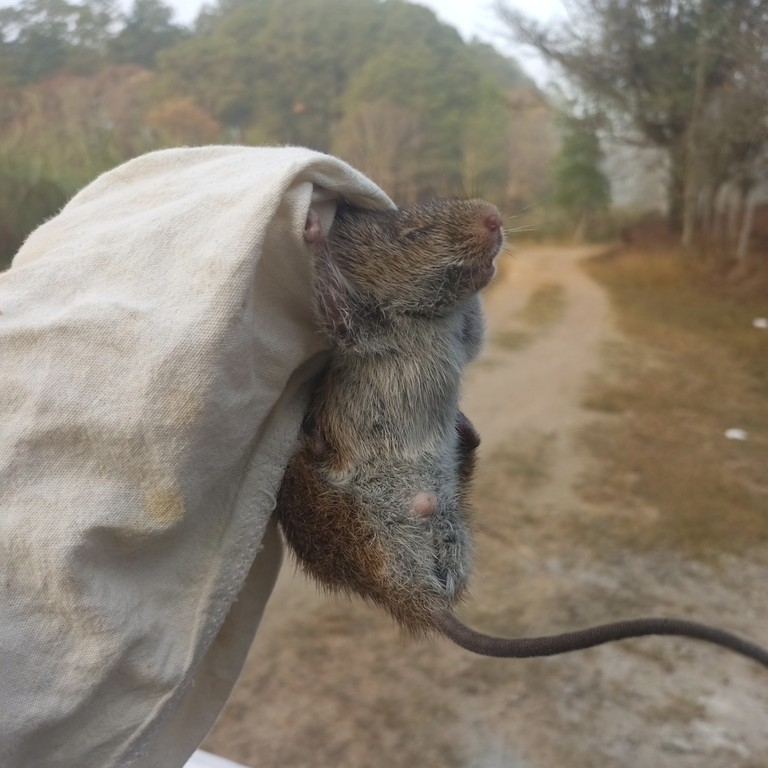

Scientific classification
- Kingdom: Animalia
- Phylum: Chordata
- Class: Mammalia
- Infraclass: Placentalia
- Order: Rodentia
- Family: Cricetidae
- Subfamily: Sigmodontinae
- Genus: Sigmodon
- Species: S. zanjonensis

Binomial name
- Sigmodon zanjonensis Goodwin, 1932

= Montane cotton rat =

Species of rodent

The montane cotton rat (Sigmodon zanjonensis), also called the Zanjon cotton rat is a rodent species in the family Cricetidae. It is found in the highlands of Chiapas, Mexico and western Guatemala. The eastern and southern limits of its range have not yet been determined.

== Discovery and taxonomy ==
Sigmodon zanjonensis was described in 1932 by George G. Goodwin based on a skull and pelt held in the American Museum of Natural History. The type specimen was collected from Zanjon, Guatemala (Quezaltenango Department). It was formerly considered to be a synonym of the Hispid cotton rat (S. hispidus) and may be a subspecies of Hispid cotton rat (S. hispidus zanjonensis).

== Morphology ==
The montane cotton rat is brown with lighter cheeks, legs, and shoulders, and a white underbelly. The fur is long and soft with black guard hairs which are tipped with yellow on the rump and sides. The base of the tail is blackish brown while the tip and white. The eyes are yellow. The ears are covered in sparse white hair.

There was little color variation among individuals collected at different geographic sites in the western highlands of Guatemala.

== Habitat ==
The montane cotton rat inhabits the western highlands of Guatemala at altitudes over 5000 feet.

It also inhabits the highlands of Chiapas, Mexico. The exact distribution of the species is uncertain as the relationship between Central American Sigmodon taxa is unclear and prior documented ranges may have included populations now considered to be distinct species.

== Behavior and reproduction ==
The montane cotton rat is primarily diurnal. There is little information regarding the natural history of the species.

The Hispid cotton rat (of which S. zanjonensis may be a subspecies), feeds primarily on seeds and plant stems and seasonally on insects. It constructs cup or ball-shaped nests of woven grasses. The gestation period last approximately 27 days and the young reach sexual maturity at 2−4 weeks (males) and 50 days (females). Litters range from 1−15 individuals and tend to be larger in dryer habitats.

A 1977 survey of cotton rats identified as S. zanjonensis in a sugarcane mill in Honduras found that over half of captured adult females were pregnant with an average of 3−4 embryos per gravid rat.

== Relationship with humans ==
The montane cotton rat is an agricultural pest which damages sugar plantations by gnawing on the stems of sugarcane.

An RT-PCR prediction model developed in identified S. zanjonensis and other Sigmodon species as potential reservoir hosts of hantaviruses. Many known species of hantavirus cause disease in humans.
