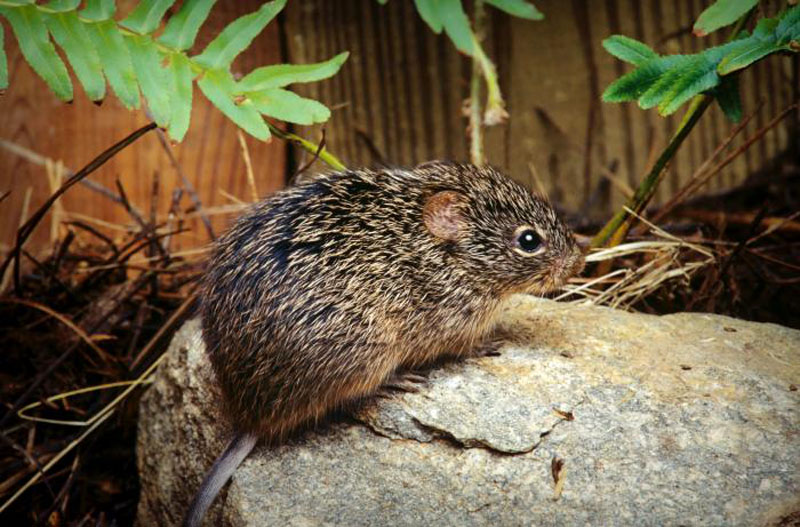
- Hispid cotton rat (Sigmodon hispidus)

Scientific classification
- Domain: Eukaryota
- Kingdom: Animalia
- Phylum: Chordata
- Class: Mammalia
- Order: Rodentia
- Family: Cricetidae
- Subfamily: Sigmodontinae
- Tribe: Sigmodontini; Wagner, 1843
- Genus: Sigmodon; Say & Ord, 1825

Type species
- Sigmodon hispidus

Species
- Sigmodon alleni Sigmodon alstoni Sigmodon arizonae Sigmodon fulviventer Sigmodon hirsutus Sigmodon hispidus Sigmodon inopinatus Sigmodon leucotis Sigmodon mascotensis Sigmodon ochrognathus Sigmodon peruanus Sigmodon planifrons Sigmodon toltecus Sigmodon zanjonensis

= Cotton rat =

Cotton rats Temporal range: Early Pliocene - Recent

Genus of rodents

A cotton rat is any member of the rodent genus Sigmodon. Their name derives from their damaging effects on cotton as well as other plantation crops, such as sugarcane, corn, peanut and rice. Cotton rats have small ears and dark coats, and are found in North and South America. Members of this genus are distributed in the Southwestern United States, Mexico, Central America, and South American countries of: Venezuela, Ecuador, Colombia, Peru, Brazil, Guyana, and Suriname. Many of the species are found in Mexico.

They are primarily herbivores. The molars of cotton rats are S-shaped when viewed from above. The genus name literally means S-tooth.

Sigmodon hispidus was the first model organism to be used in polio research.

== Classification ==
- Genus Sigmodon
  - Subgenus Sigmodon
    - Sigmodon hispidus species group
      - Sigmodon alleni - Allen's cotton rat
      - Sigmodon arizonae - Arizona cotton rat
      - Sigmodon hirsutus - Southern cotton rat
      - Sigmodon hispidus - Hispid cotton rat
      - Sigmodon mascotensis - Jaliscan cotton rat
      - Sigmodon ochrognathus - Yellow-nosed cotton rat
      - Sigmodon planifrons - Miahuatlán cotton rat
      - Sigmodon toltecus - Toltec cotton rat
      - Sigmodon zanjonensis - montane cotton rat
    - Sigmodon fulviventer species group
      - Sigmodon fulviventer - tawny-bellied cotton rat
      - Sigmodon inopinatus - unexpected cotton rat
      - Sigmodon leucotis - white-eared cotton rat
      - Sigmodon peruanus - Peruvian cotton rat
  - Subgenus Sigmomys
    - Sigmodon alstoni - Alston's cotton rat
