= Allen's cotton rat =

Conservation status
- Least Concern (IUCN 3.1)

Scientific classification
- Kingdom: Animalia
- Phylum: Chordata
- Class: Mammalia
- Order: Rodentia
- Family: Cricetidae
- Subfamily: Sigmodontinae
- Genus: Sigmodon
- Species: S. alleni

Binomial name
- Sigmodon alleni Bailey, 1902

Species of rodent

Allen's cotton rat (Sigmodon alleni) is a species of rodent in the family Cricetidae. It is endemic to western Mexico, where its distribution extends from Sinaloa to Oaxaca. The formerly recognized S. planifrons and S. vulcani are now considered conspecific with S. alleni by the IUCN.

This species lives in tropical and mixed forests. It creates runways in grassy areas and constructs nests out of grass in logs, under rocks, and in clumps of vegetation. It is affected by deforestation in its native range.
