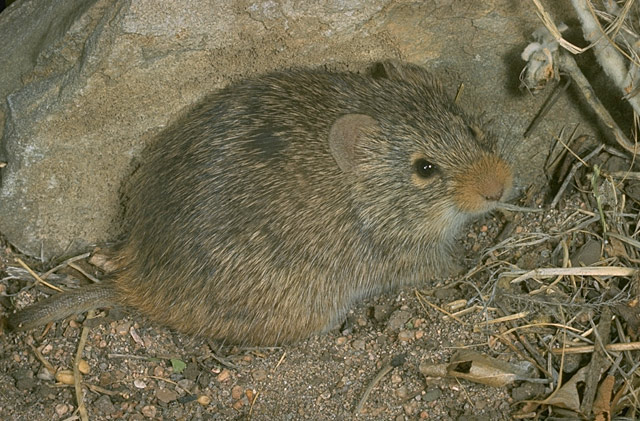

Conservation status
- Least Concern (IUCN 3.1)

Scientific classification
- Kingdom: Animalia
- Phylum: Chordata
- Class: Mammalia
- Order: Rodentia
- Family: Cricetidae
- Subfamily: Sigmodontinae
- Genus: Sigmodon
- Species: S. ochrognathus

Binomial name
- Sigmodon ochrognathus Bailey, 1902

= Yellow-nosed cotton rat =

Species of rodent

The yellow-nosed cotton rat (Sigmodon ochrognathus) is a species of rodent in the family Cricetidae. It is native to Mexico and to the states of Arizona, New Mexico, and Texas in the United States, where it inhabits mountain grassland, scrub, and pinyon-juniper woodland. It is common over much of its wide range and the IUCN considers it to be of "least concern".

== Description ==
In captivity, male yellow-nosed cotton rats grow to a maximum head and body length of about 155 mm (6 in) with females being slightly shorter and heavier. No significant sexual dimorphism has been noted in the wild. The head is short and broad and the tail is hairy, with many small scales no more than 0.5 mm (0.02 in) wide. The fur on the head, back, and sides is a dull gray color, apart from the snout and a ring round the eye which are ochre, features that distinguish this species from other members of the genus Sigmodon. The underparts are grayish-white, the feet grayish-buff, the upper side of the tail blackish and the underside gray.

== Distribution and habitat ==
The yellow-nosed cotton rat is native to Mexico and to the states of Arizona, New Mexico, and Texas in the United States. Its range extends from the eastern side of the Sierra Madre Occidental to central Durango and western Coahuila in Mexico, and from Arizona to New Mexico and scattered desert ranges of the Mesa del Norte in trans-Pecos Texas in the United States. Its habitat is mountainous areas with grassy meadows, rocky slopes, shrubland, ponderosa pine, Douglas fir, and pinyon-juniper woodland. It is generally found on the lower, drier slopes at altitudes below 1,950 m (6,400 ft) . This species is the most xerophilous in its genus.

== Breeding ==
Nests of the yellow-nosed cotton rat are often hidden inside tussocks of grass or other dense vegetation. They are made of grass and are 18 to 40 cm (7 to 16 in) in diameter. Females become sexually mature at around 45 days of age. The gestation period is about 34 days and usually two to six young are born in a litter. They are precocial and able to leave the nest soon after birth, their eyes open during the first day, they grow rapidly, and are weaned at around 15 days.

== Ecology ==
The yellow-nosed cotton rat does not compete well with other species of cotton rats, such as the white-eared cotton rat (Sigmodon leucotis), and where their ranges overlap, it occupies thinly vegetated, rocky slopes with tussocks of grass. In Arizona, it is often found on open slopes among scattered Emory oak, Arizona oak, alligator juniper, yucca, agave, mimosa, sugar sumac, prickly pear, and desert spoon. These plants often have long foliage growing at their bases, and the cotton rat uses these for cover. It shares its habitat with the fulvous harvest mouse (Reithrodontomys fulvescens) and southern pocket gopher (Thomomys umbrinus) and uses the burrows of the latter, as well as cavities under boulders.

Where it is the only cotton rat in a locality, the yellow-nosed cotton rat inhabits grassy meadows and alluvial fans where the soil is deeper. In these habitats, it makes runs between the clumps of grass, but in sparsely vegetated areas, these runways are difficult to discern. It is primarily active during the day, moving fast along its runways so as to be exposed to predation for as little time as possible. It feeds primarily on blue grama grass (Bouteloua gracilis), but also the green parts of other plants such as muhly, three-leaf groundsel, gumweed, and three-awn tangle-head, and less frequently on seeds and fruits. It cuts sections of grasses and forms small piles of grass blades on the surface and caches further piles of dried foliage underground, often in the abandoned burrows of southern pocket gophers.

== Status ==
The yellow-nosed cotton rat has a wide range and is common in parts of that range. The total population is presumed to be large, and although it is thought to be decreasing in numbers in some places, it is expanding its range in others. For these reasons, the IUCN lists it as being of "least concern".
