= Miahuatlán cotton rat =

Conservation status
- Endangered (IUCN 3.1)

Scientific classification
- Kingdom: Animalia
- Phylum: Chordata
- Class: Mammalia
- Order: Rodentia
- Family: Cricetidae
- Subfamily: Sigmodontinae
- Genus: Sigmodon
- Species: S. planifrons

Binomial name
- Sigmodon planifrons Nelson & Goldman, 1933

Species of rodent

The Miahuatlán cotton rat (Sigmodon planifrons) was formerly considered a rodent species in the family Cricetidae. It is found only on the Pacific slope of the Sierra de Miahuatlán in the Mexican state of Oaxaca, where it lives in a deciduous tropical forest. The IUCN currently considers it to be conspecific with Sigmodon alleni.
