= Peruvian cotton rat =

Conservation status
- Least Concern (IUCN 3.1)

Scientific classification
- Kingdom: Animalia
- Phylum: Chordata
- Class: Mammalia
- Order: Rodentia
- Family: Cricetidae
- Subfamily: Sigmodontinae
- Genus: Sigmodon
- Species: S. peruanus

Binomial name
- Sigmodon peruanus J.A. Allen, 1897

Species of rodent

The Peruvian cotton rat (Sigmodon peruanus) is a species of rodent in the family Cricetidae. It is found in Ecuador and Peru.
