= Alston's cotton rat =

Conservation status
- Least Concern (IUCN 3.1)

Scientific classification
- Kingdom: Animalia
- Phylum: Chordata
- Class: Mammalia
- Order: Rodentia
- Family: Cricetidae
- Subfamily: Sigmodontinae
- Genus: Sigmodon
- Species: S. alstoni

Binomial name
- Sigmodon alstoni Thomas, 1881

Species of rodent

Alston's cotton rat (Sigmodon alstoni) is a rodent species from South America. It is found in Brazil, Colombia, Guyana, Suriname, and Venezuela, where it inhabits lowland savannas.
