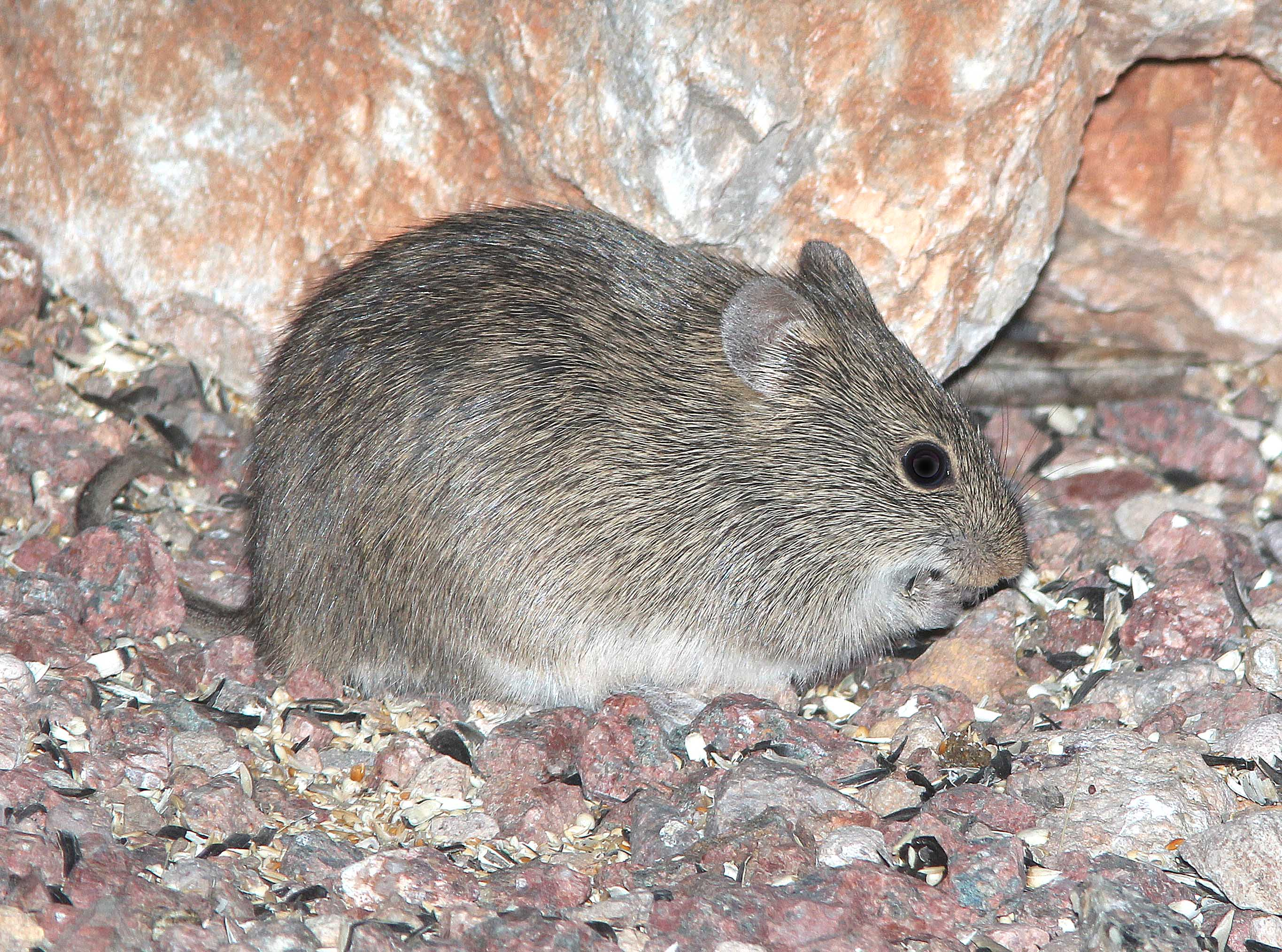

Conservation status
- Least Concern (IUCN 3.1)

Scientific classification
- Kingdom: Animalia
- Phylum: Chordata
- Class: Mammalia
- Order: Rodentia
- Family: Cricetidae
- Subfamily: Sigmodontinae
- Genus: Sigmodon
- Species: S. arizonae

Binomial name
- Sigmodon arizonae Mearns, 1890

= Arizona cotton rat =

Species of rodent

The Arizona cotton rat or Colorado River cotton rat (Sigmodon arizonae) is a rat in the family Cricetidae. It is found in the southwestern United States and northwestern Mexico.

== Description ==
The Arizona cotton rat has a typical rat-like appearance, and is sufficiently similar to the hispid cotton rat that it was considered to be part of the same species until 1970, when genetic analysis confirmed its distinct nature. It has bristly brownish fur over most of its body, with whitish underparts and grey feet. The scaly tail is dark in color, with very sparse fur. Adults range from 9.8 to 14.2 inches (250 to 360 mm) in total length, including the 3.9 to 5.9 in (99 to 150 mm) long tail, and weigh anything from 2.9 to 10.6 ounces (82 to 301 g). Males are slightly larger than females, but the two sexes are otherwise similar in appearance.

Females have ten or twelve teats, suggesting a maximum litter size of around this number. Reproduction is thought to occur year-round.

== Distribution and habitat ==
The Arizona cotton rat is found in southern and central Arizona, the extreme southwestern corner of New Mexico, and in western Mexico from Sonora to Nayarit. They live close to rivers, streams, and other sources of fresh water in semidesert, open grassland, or swampy habitats throughout the region. They rely particularly on areas of dense grassy vegetation. Two of the five recognized subspecies are believed to have gone extinct during the twentieth century, including the nominate subspecies, Sigmodon arizonae arizonae. Three subspecies therefore remain:

- Sigmodon arizonae cienegae - Arizona, northern Sonora
- Sigmodon arizonae major - southern Sonora, Sinaloa, Nayarit
- Sigmodon arizonae plenus - western La Paz County, Arizona
