= Unexpected cotton rat =

Conservation status
- Vulnerable (IUCN 3.1)

Scientific classification
- Kingdom: Animalia
- Phylum: Chordata
- Class: Mammalia
- Order: Rodentia
- Family: Cricetidae
- Subfamily: Sigmodontinae
- Genus: Sigmodon
- Species: S. inopinatus

Binomial name
- Sigmodon inopinatus Anthony, 1924

Species of rodent

The unexpected cotton rat (Sigmodon inopinatus) is a species of rodent in the family Cricetidae. It is found only in Ecuador at elevations of 3500 to 4000 m, where it has been found in association with streams and marshes. It is also known as the Ecuadorian cotton rat.
