= Toltec cotton rat =

Conservation status
- Least Concern (IUCN 3.1)

Scientific classification
- Kingdom: Animalia
- Phylum: Chordata
- Class: Mammalia
- Order: Rodentia
- Family: Cricetidae
- Subfamily: Sigmodontinae
- Genus: Sigmodon
- Species: S. toltecus

Binomial name
- Sigmodon toltecus Saussure, 1860

Species of rodent

The Toltec cotton rat (Sigmodon toltecus) is a rodent species in the family Cricetidae. It is found in eastern Mexico from the Rio Grande to the Yucatán Peninsula, as well as in Belize and northern Guatemala. It prefers moist grassland habitat. While long thought to be a subspecies of S. hispidus, recent taxonomic revisions, based on mitochondrial DNA sequence data, have split the extensive former species range into three separate species. Carroll et al. (2004) indicate that the southern edge of the S. hispidus distribution is likely near the Rio Grande where it meets the northern distribution of S. toltecus (formerly S. h. toltecus). The range of S. toltecus extends from northern Mexico south into Chiapas where it occurs in sympatry with S. hirsutus (formerly S. h. hirsutus). Rats from this species group have been used as laboratory animals.

== Notes ==
- Carroll, D. S., L. L. Peppers, and R. D. Bradley. 2004. Molecular systematics and phylogeography of the Sigmodon hispidus species group. pp. 85–98, in Contribuciones Mastozoologicas en Homenaje a Bernardo Villa (Sanchez-Cordero V. y R. A. Medellin Eds.) Instituto de Biologia e Instituto de Ecologia, UNAM, Mexico.
