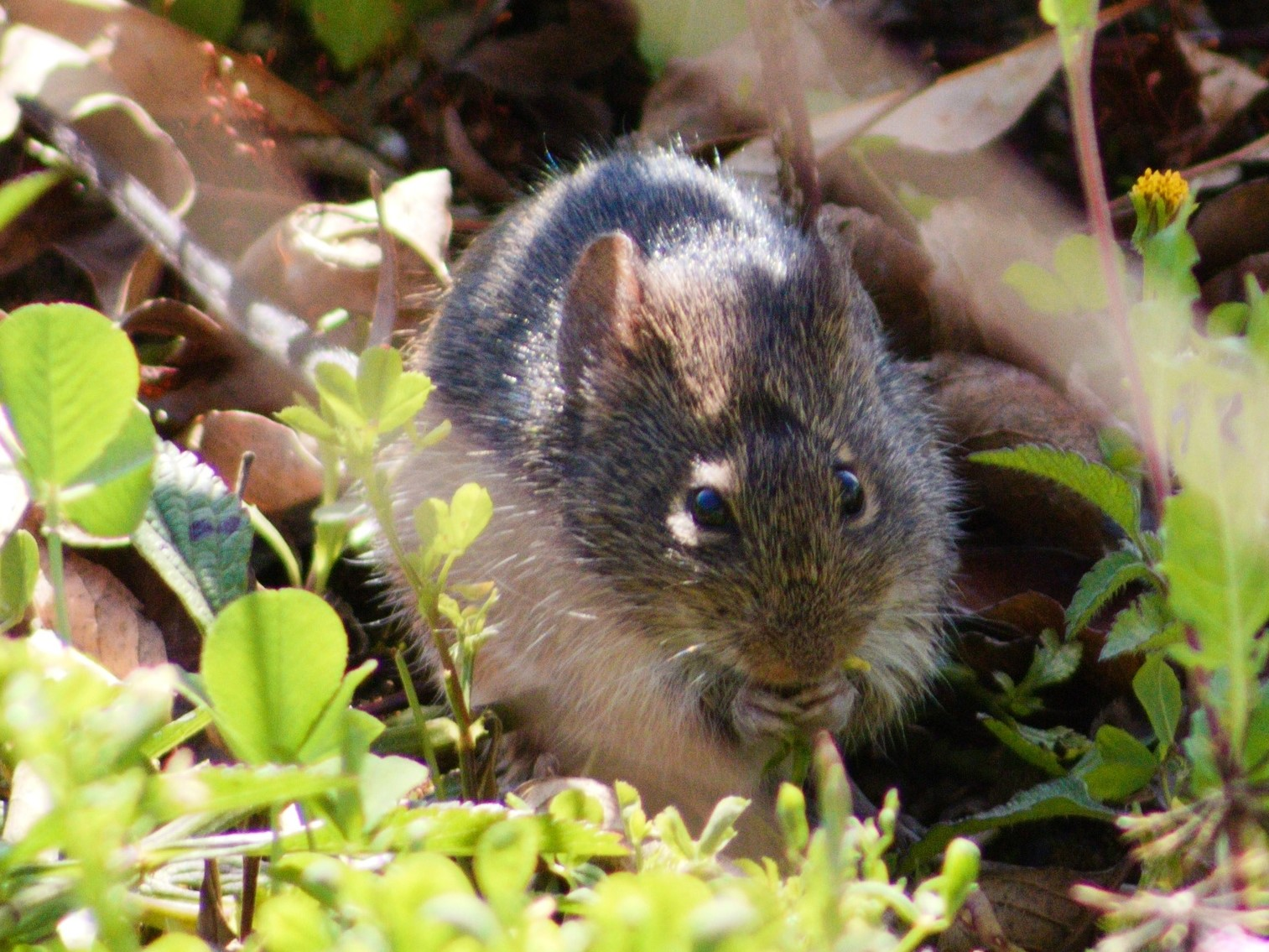

Conservation status
- Least Concern (IUCN 3.1)

Scientific classification
- Kingdom: Animalia
- Phylum: Chordata
- Class: Mammalia
- Order: Rodentia
- Family: Cricetidae
- Subfamily: Sigmodontinae
- Genus: Sigmodon
- Species: S. hirsutus

Binomial name
- Sigmodon hirsutus Burmeister, 1854

= Southern cotton rat =

Species of rodent

The southern cotton rat (Sigmodon hirsutus) is a rodent species in the family Cricetidae. It is found from southern Chiapas in Mexico through Central America, except for Belize, and as far east as northern Colombia and Venezuela. It lives in tropical rainforest, dry forest and savanna, as well as in cultivated areas. The species is terrestrial and primarily diurnal. It was long thought to be a subspecies of S. hispidus. However, recent taxonomic revisions, based on mitochondrial DNA sequence data, have split the extensive former species range into three separate species. Carroll et al. (2004) indicate that the southern edge of the S. hispidus distribution is likely near the Rio Grande where it meets the northern distribution of S. toltecus (formerly S. h. toltecus). The range of S. toltecus extends from northern Mexico south into Chiapas where it occurs in sympatry with S. hirsutus (formerly S. h. hirsutus). Rats from this species group have been used as laboratory animals.
