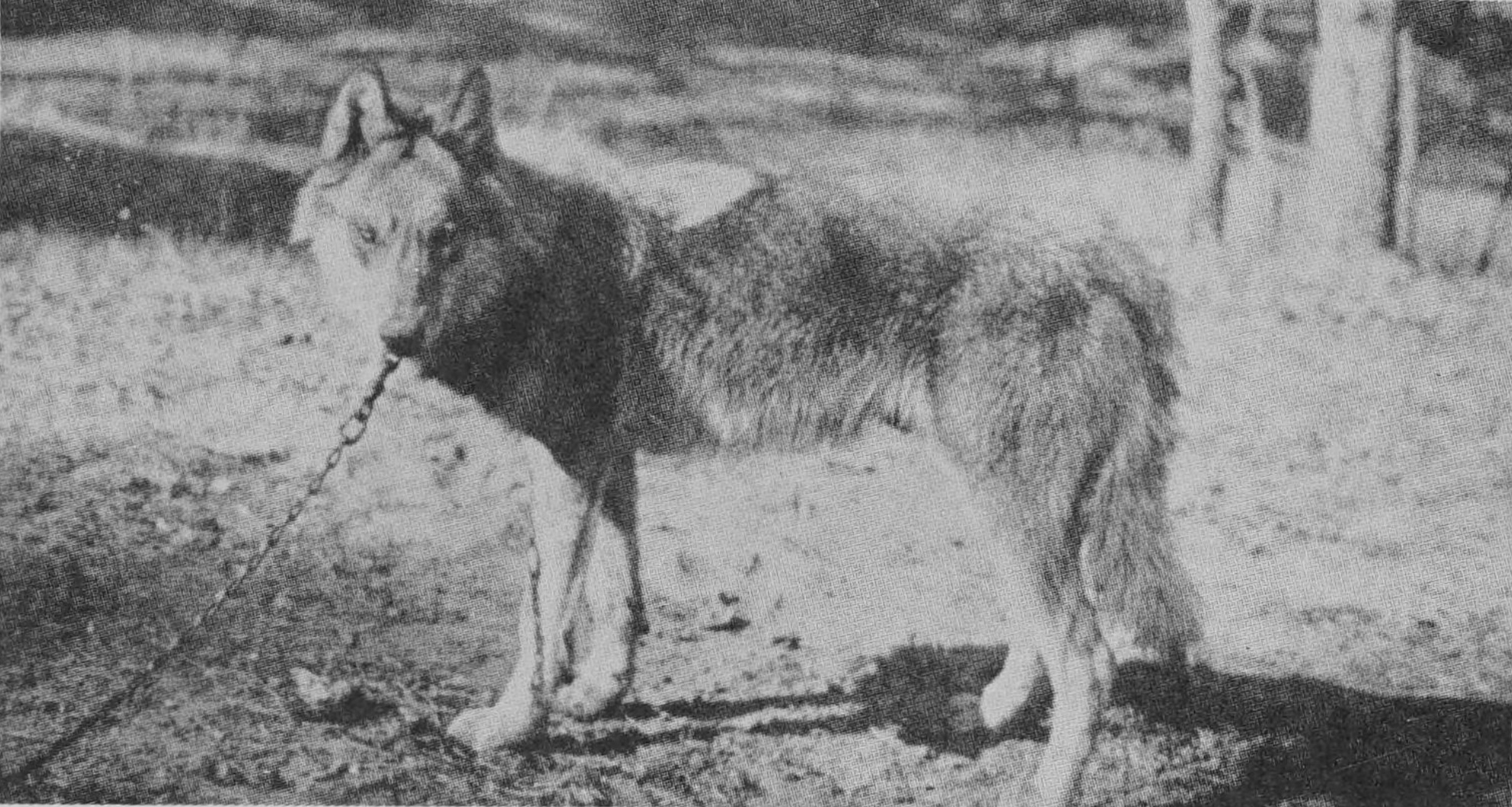
- Captive specimen in Black Range, New Mexico

Conservation status
- Extinct (1960) (IUCN 3.1)

Scientific classification
- Kingdom: Animalia
- Phylum: Chordata
- Class: Mammalia
- Order: Carnivora
- Family: Canidae
- Genus: Canis
- Species: C. lupus
- Subspecies: †C. l. mogollonensis

Trinomial name
- †Canis lupus mogollonensis Goldman, 1937
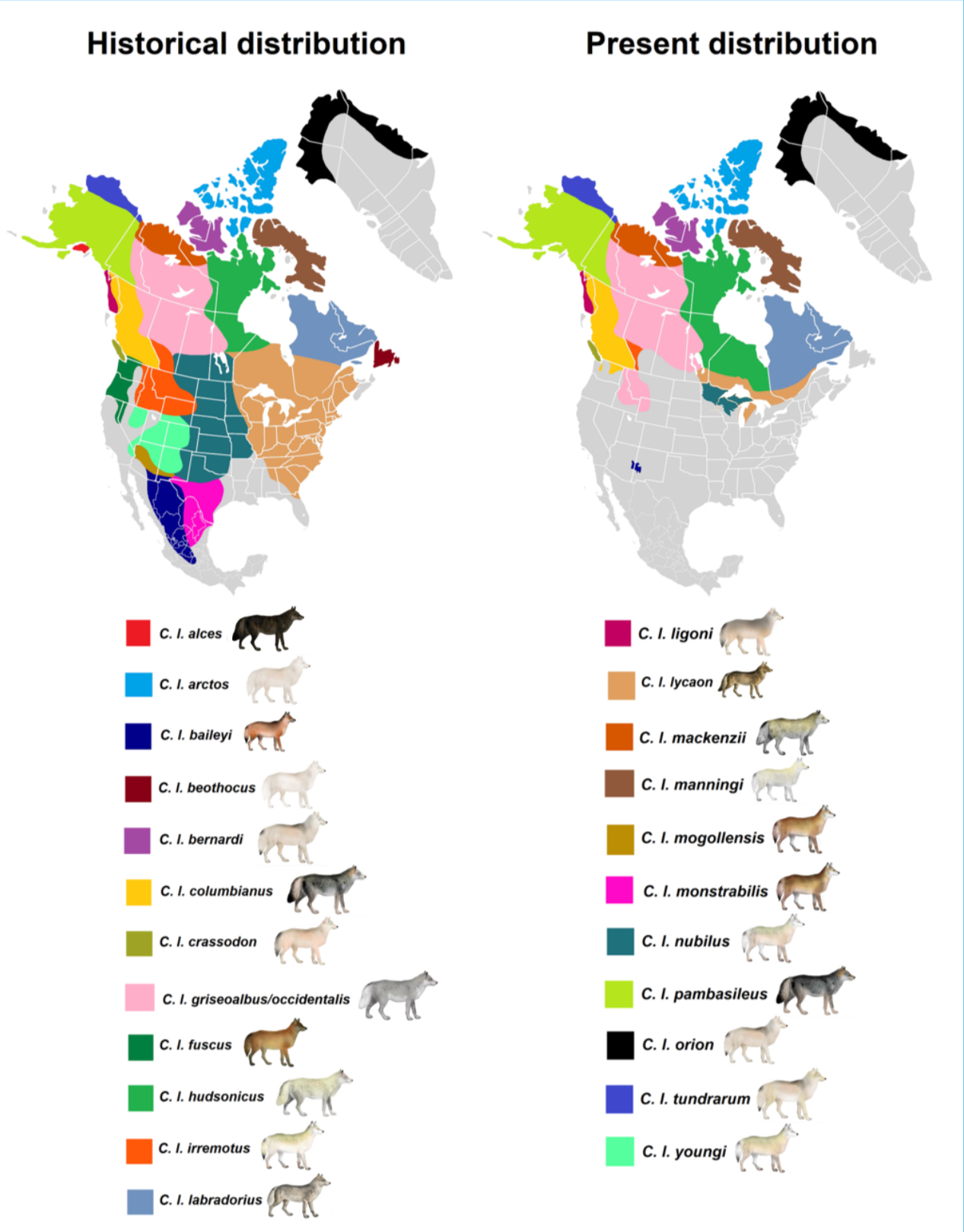
- Historical and present range of gray wolf subspecies in North America

= Mogollon mountain wolf =

Extinct subspecies of gray wolf

The Mogollon mountain wolf (Canis lupus mogollonensis) is an extinct subspecies of gray wolf whose range once included Arizona and New Mexico. It is darker than its more northern cousins, and has a highly arched frontal bone.

== Taxonomy ==
This wolf is recognized as a subspecies of Canis lupus in the taxonomic authority Mammal Species of the World (2005).

Because of its overlapping range with the Mexican wolf (C. l. baileyi), along with the Texas wolf (C. l. monstrabilis), it was proposed by biologists Bogan and Mehlhop for the Mogollon mountain wolf and the Texas wolf to be considered subspecies as the Mexican wolf. This was because the Mogollon mountain wolf was seen as merely a possible middle subspecies between the Mexican wolf and the Southern Rocky Mountains wolf, thus making it unnecessary to distinguish taxonomically. This was accepted by the US Fish and Wildlife Service in 1982 and a "zone of subspecies intergradation" was recognized soon thereafter, extending from the southern Rocky Mountains to the northern tip of the Mexican wolf's range.

The NCBI/Genbank has an entry for Canis lupus mogollonensis and a separate entry for Canis lupus baileyi.

== Extinction ==
By 1927, native wolves were extirpated from New Mexico, the only concern for wolfers were vagrant wolves from Mexico. The final wolf kill in Arizona occurred in March 1960, in the Fort Apache Indian Reservation.
