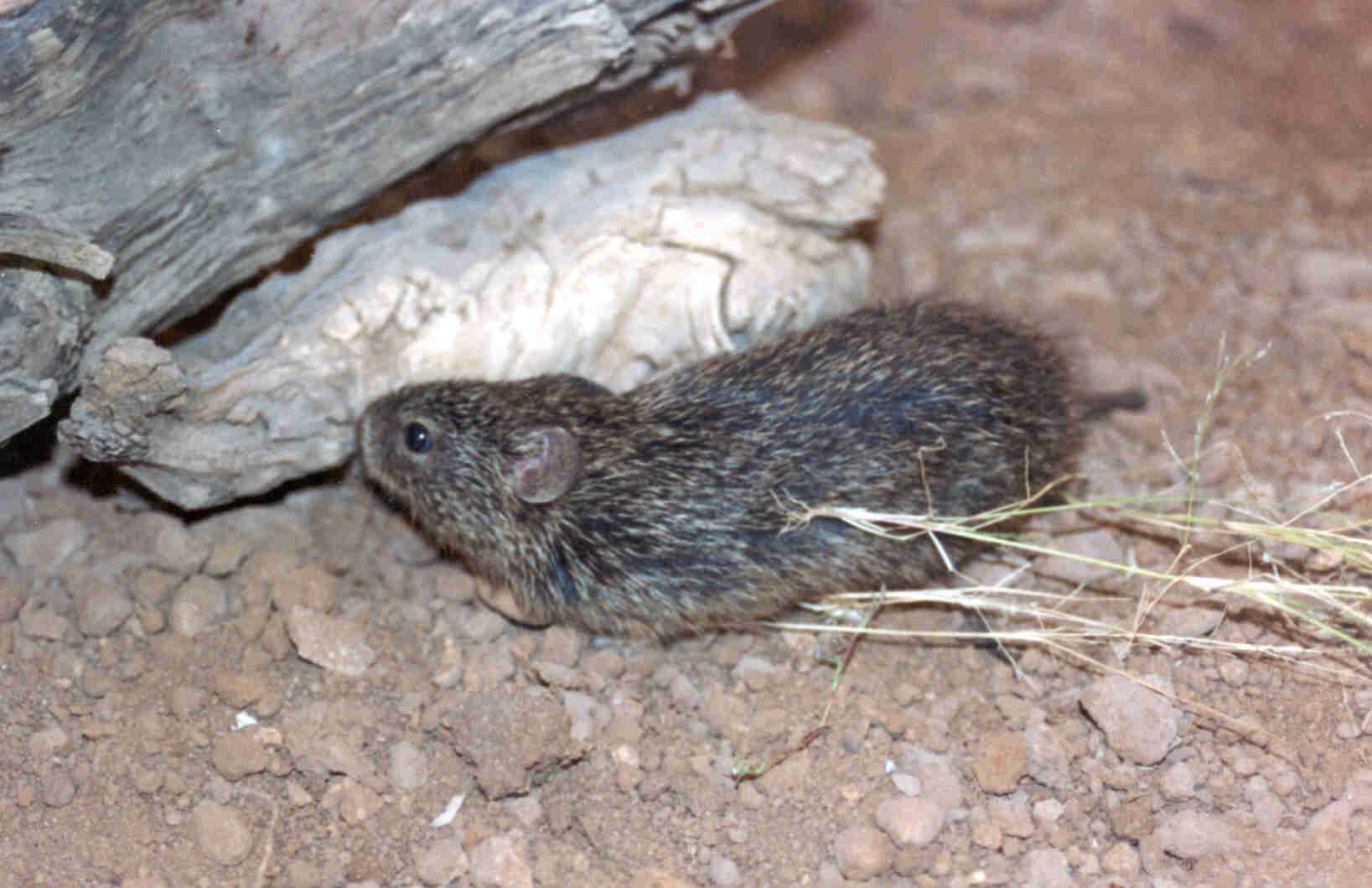
- S. fulviventer in Janos, Chihuahua, Mexico

Conservation status
- Least Concern (IUCN 3.1)

Scientific classification
- Kingdom: Animalia
- Phylum: Chordata
- Class: Mammalia
- Order: Rodentia
- Family: Cricetidae
- Subfamily: Sigmodontinae
- Genus: Sigmodon
- Species: S. fulviventer

Binomial name
- Sigmodon fulviventer J.A. Allen, 1889

= Tawny-bellied cotton rat =

Species of rodent

The tawny-bellied cotton rat (Sigmodon fulviventer) is a species of rodent in the family Cricetidae. It is found in Mexico and in the US states of Arizona and New Mexico.

== Description ==
Sexual dimorphism is not present, but the adult male weighs slightly more than the female at 222 grams (7.8 oz) compared to 206 grams (7.3 oz). The tail has small scales and is covered in hair which distinguishes it from the larger scales of the closely related hispid cotton rat (Sigmodon hispidus). Another characteristic distinguishing it from S. hispidus is a short and broad rather than elongated skull. The dentition is marked by well-developed maxillary incisors and high-crowned molars.

The fur is tawny on the belly (the origin of the species' common name), and black and tan speckled on the back. The fur body contains three types of hair: guard-awl hair, guard hair, and under hair. The guard hair is the longest with the guard-awl and under hair following in decreasing length. Whiskers are located on the face and have been observed to play a role in maintaining body position while swimming.

== Distribution and habitat ==
The species inhabits the grasslands of central Mexico, expanding north to the central and southwestern parts of New Mexico and southeastern parts of Arizona. It prefers areas with dense grass, in which it makes navigational trails called runways that resemble a tunnel with a grass covering. It feeds on grasses, specifically bunchgrass, which they also use in nest-building. Its range in central New Mexico is expanding westward due to an increase in precipitation and in temperature from climate change.

The tawny-bellied cotton rat occurs in the same area as the closely related hispid cotton rat, with the former occupying the moister areas and the latter the more arid areas. When living in adjacent habitats, one species tends to become more numerous while the other maintains a smaller population. Even though both species seem to avoid one another, there is a passive, indirect competition between the species. In Durango, Mexico, S. fulviventer was found to be dominant, probably due to being a specialist compared to the generalist S. hispidus.

== As a model animal ==
The tawny-bellied cotton rat is used as a model organism to develop and test human pathogen treatments. It is affected by many of the same viral and bacterial infections that humans are susceptible to, which helps create vaccines and therapeutic treatments. Other factors that make the species a desirable test subject are the existence of inbred strains, ease of handling, and inexpensive upkeep. Some of the diseases tested on the cotton rat are respiratory syncytial virus, and pulmonary tuberculosis, and HIV type-1.

In the case of HIV type-1, finding an animal with similar antibody response to the virus as humans can prove difficult. A study conducted in 1998 found that the tawny-bellied cotton rat can be infected by low-level HIV-1. A similar immune response to humans is activated on infection. The degree of infection may be increased by altering the co-receptors on the animal's cells, which would improve the reliability of the test subject.

The species was found to undergo an equivalent infection to pulmonary tuberculosis as humans. This is an upgrade over the previous animal models of other small rodents and rabbits. Cotton rats combine the best traits of human-like lung granuloma formation (trait of rabbits) and inexpensive care (trait of other small rodents) to provide a suitable host for this type of study. Future research is underway to use the cotton rat for studying pulmonary tuberculosis complicated by HIV-1 due to similarities with humans in both diseases.
