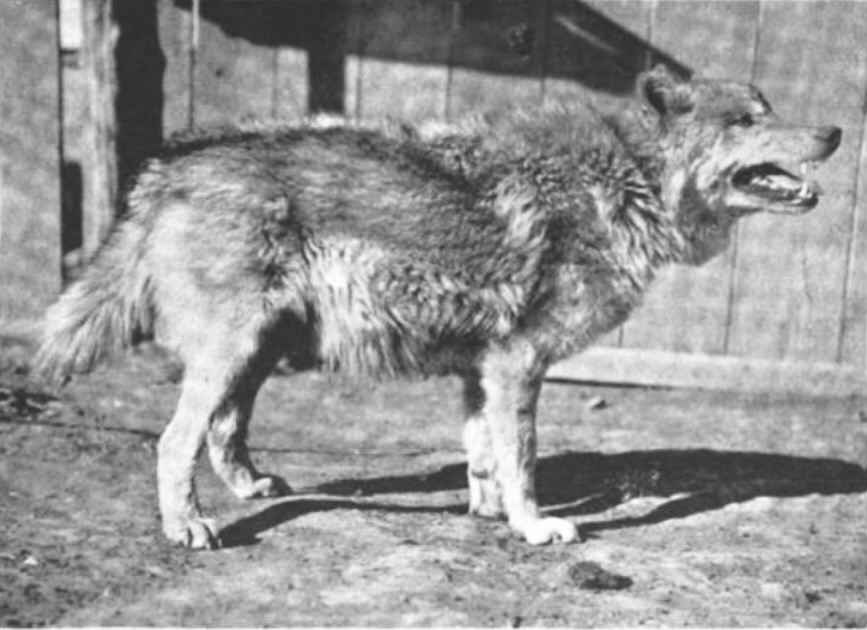
- Texas gray wolf in Goodnight Ranch

Conservation status
- Extinct (1942) (IUCN 3.1)

Scientific classification
- Kingdom: Animalia
- Phylum: Chordata
- Class: Mammalia
- Order: Carnivora
- Family: Canidae
- Genus: Canis
- Species: C. lupus
- Subspecies: †C. l. monstrabilis

Trinomial name
- †Canis lupus monstrabilis Goldman, 1937
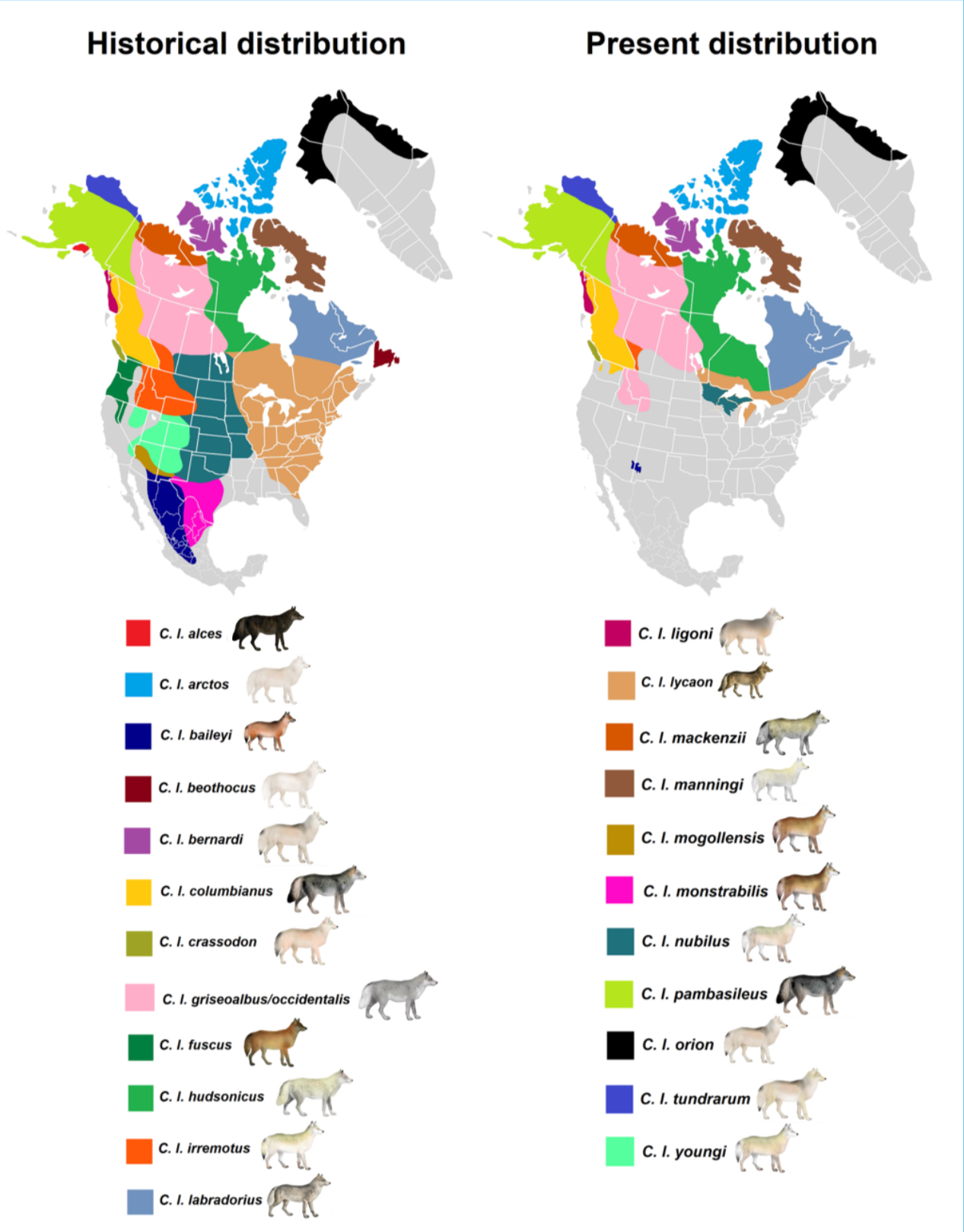
- Historical and present range of gray wolf subspecies in North America

Synonyms
- niger (Bartram, 1791)

= Texas gray wolf =

Texas grey wolf

Extinct subspecies of gray wolf

The Texas gray wolf (Canis lupus monstrabilis) is an extinct subspecies of gray wolf, distinct from the Texas red wolf (Canis rufus rufus), whose range once included southern and western Texas and northeastern Mexico.

== Taxonomy ==
It is recognized as a subspecies of Canis lupus in the taxonomic authority Mammal Species of the World (2005).

The Texas gray wolf and the Mogollon mountain wolf were proposed by biologists Bogan and Mehlhop to be intergrading populations between the Mexican wolf and Southern Rocky Mountains and were placed under the synonymy of the Mexican wolf. Ronald M. Nowak considered Texas gray wolves and Mogollon mountain wolves as ecotypes of Great Plains wolves rather than Mexican wolf populations or distinct subspecies when introducing a 5-subspecies North American taxonomy in 1995.

The subspecies' name monstrābilis means "remarkable, noteworthy" in Latin, and derives from the verb mōnstrāre (to show) and the suffix -ābilis (worthy of). In Texas, gray wolves called "timber wolves" or "lobo wolves" to distinguish them from red wolves. The words "lobo" and "loafer" come from the Spanish lobo and were used in the Southwestern United States.

=== Evolution ===
Gray wolves (Canis lupus) migrated from Eurasia into North America 70,000–23,000 years ago and gave rise to at least two morphologically and genetically distinct groups. One group is represented by the extinct Beringian wolf and the other by the modern populations. One author proposes that the Mexican wolf's ancestors were likely the first gray wolves to cross the Bering Land Bridge into North America during the Late Pleistocene after the extinction of the Beringian wolf, colonizing most of the continent until pushed southwards by the newly arrived ancestors of the Great Plains wolf (C. l. nubilus).

A haplotype is a group of genes found in an organism that are inherited together from one of their parents. Mitochondrial DNA (mDNA) passes along the maternal line and can date back thousands of years. A 2005 study compared the mitochondrial DNA sequences of modern wolves with those from thirty-four specimens dated between 1856 and 1915. The historic population was found to possess twice the genetic diversity of modern wolves, which suggests that the mDNA diversity of the wolves eradicated from the western US was more than twice that of the modern population. Some haplotypes possessed by the Mexican wolf, the Great Plains wolf, and the extinct Southern Rocky Mountain wolf were found to form a unique "southern clade". All North American wolves group together with those from Eurasia, except for the southern clade which form a group exclusive to North America.

== Description ==
It was darker than its more northern cousins, and has a highly arched frontal bone. The Texas grey wolf's weight ranged from 34 to 45 kg (75 to 100 lb).

== Extinction ==
This wolf's prey were driven to extirpation in its habitat, leading it to hunt farmer's livestock. The last known Texas gray wolf was killed April 12, 1942, by Nelson Elliot on the Cleavland Ranch. This led the Mexican wolf to become the last gray wolf subspecies in Texas, though they were extirpated in 1970.
