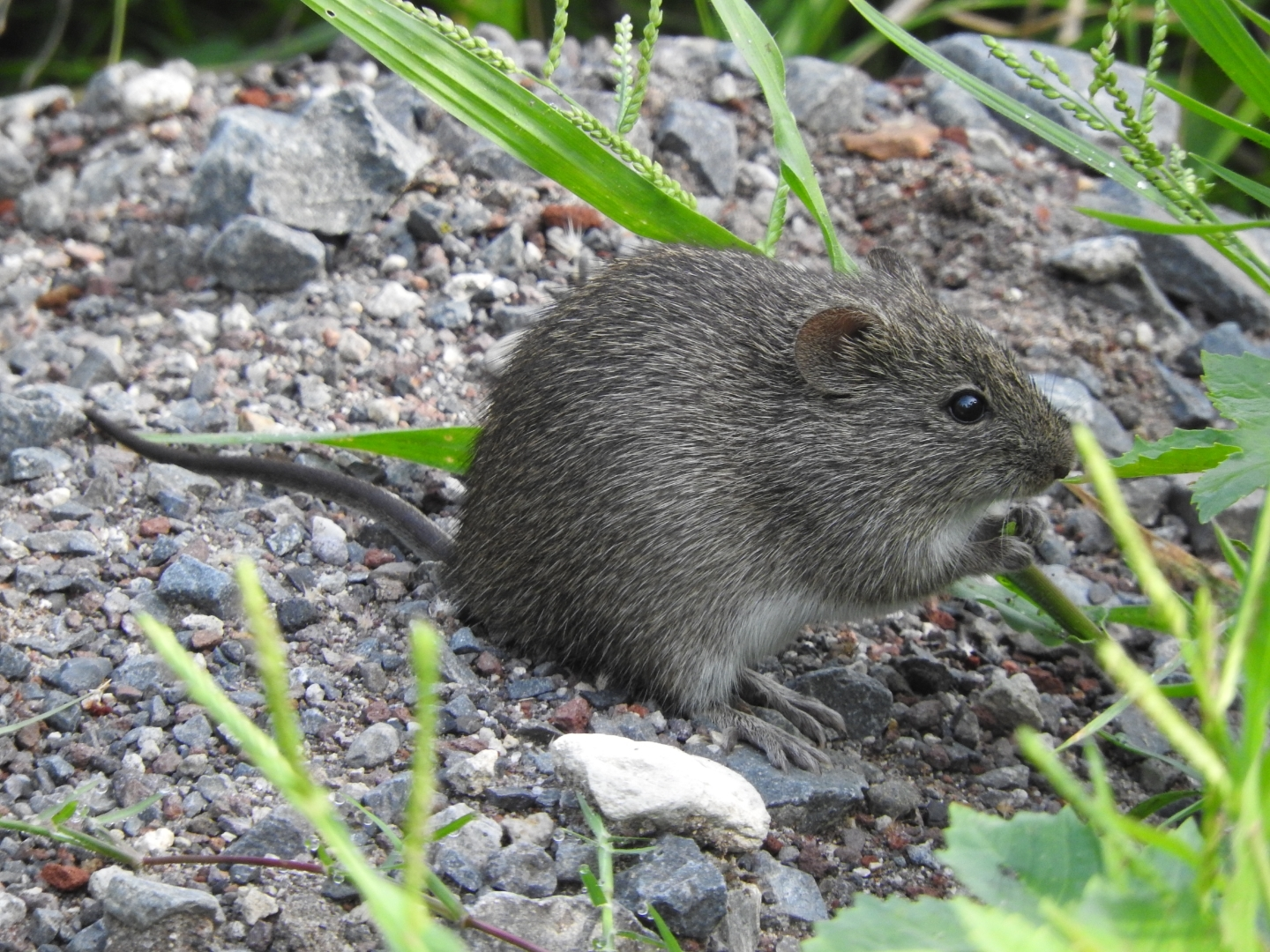

Conservation status
- Least Concern (IUCN 3.1)

Scientific classification
- Kingdom: Animalia
- Phylum: Chordata
- Class: Mammalia
- Order: Rodentia
- Family: Cricetidae
- Subfamily: Sigmodontinae
- Genus: Sigmodon
- Species: S. leucotis

Binomial name
- Sigmodon leucotis Bailey, 1902

= White-eared cotton rat =

Species of rodent

The white-eared cotton rat (Sigmodon leucotis) is a species of rodent in the family Cricetidae. It is found only in Mexico.
