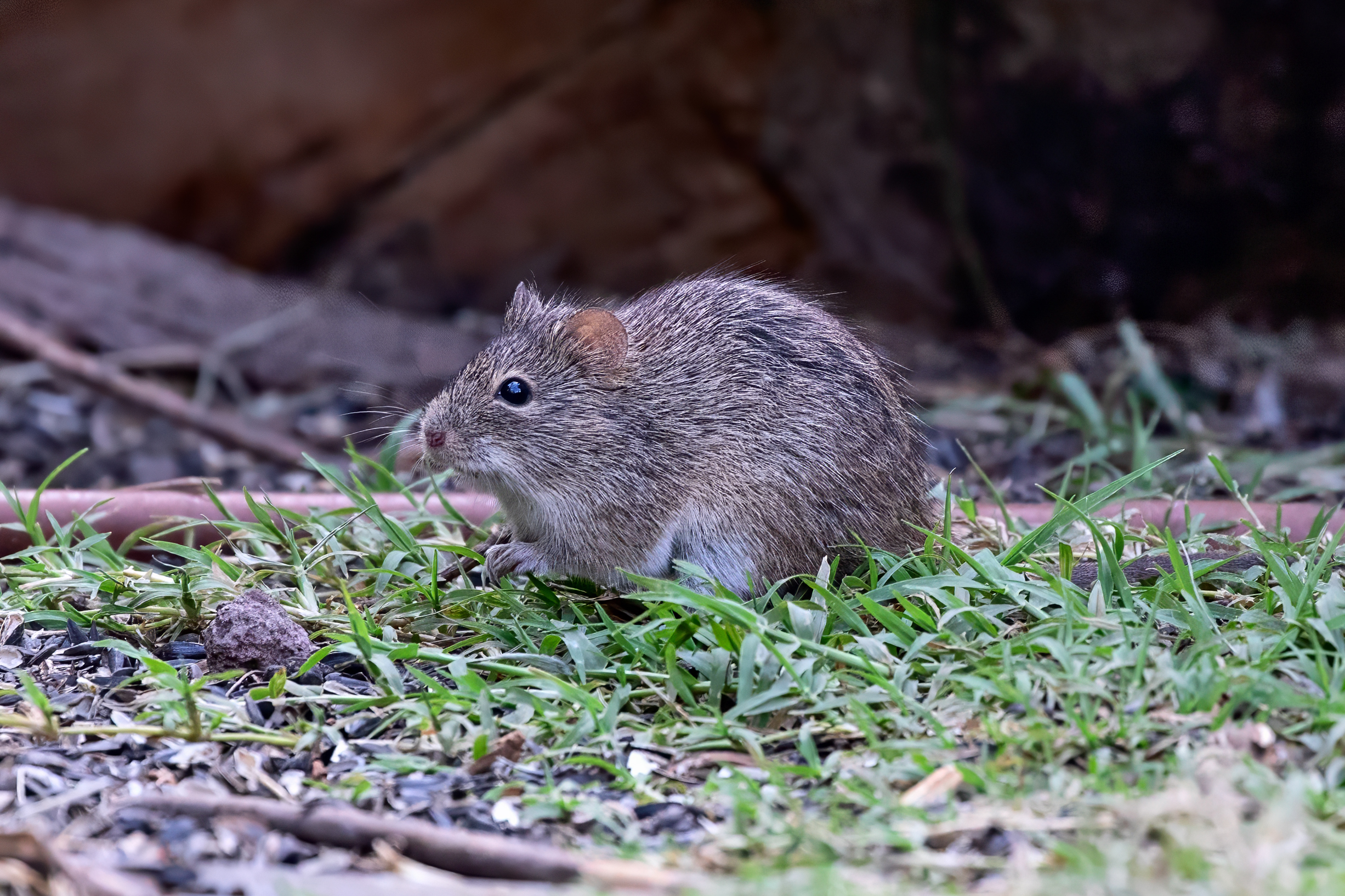

Conservation status
- Least Concern (IUCN 3.1)

Scientific classification
- Kingdom: Animalia
- Phylum: Chordata
- Class: Mammalia
- Order: Rodentia
- Family: Cricetidae
- Subfamily: Sigmodontinae
- Genus: Sigmodon
- Species: S. hispidus

Binomial name
- Sigmodon hispidus Say and Ord, 1825

= Hispid cotton rat =

Species of rodent

The hispid cotton rat (Sigmodon hispidus) is a rat long thought to occur in parts of South America, Central America, and southern North America. However, recent taxonomic revisions, based on mitochondrial DNA sequence data, have split this widely distributed species into three separate species (S. hispidus, S. toltecus, and S. hirsutus). The distribution of S. hispidus ranges from Arizona in the west to Virginia to the east and from the Platte River in Nebraska in the north to, likely, the Rio Grande in the south, where it meets the northern edge of the distribution of S. toltecus (formerly S. h. toltecus). Adult size is total length 202–340 mm (8.0–13.4 in); tail 87–122 mm (3.4–4.8 in), frequently broken or stubbed; hind foot 29–35 mm (1.1–1.4 in); ear 16–20 mm (0.63–0.79 in); mass 50–250 g (1.8–8.8 oz). They have been used as laboratory animals.

== Taxonomy ==
The currently accepted scientific name for the hispid cotton rat is Sigmodon hispidus. It is a member of the family Cricetidae. Although 25 subspecies are accepted, including the type subspecies, the most distinct genetic subdivision within S. hispidus separates the species into two genetic lineages, an eastern one and a western one, which hybridize along a contact zone.

== Distribution ==
In the United States, the hispid cotton rat ranges from southern Virginia and North Carolina (especially the coastal plain) west through Tennessee, northern Missouri, Kansas, and extreme southern Nebraska to southeastern Colorado, New Mexico, and southeastern Arizona; south to the Gulf Coast; and south to northern Mexico. It does not occur on the coastal plain of North Carolina nor in the mountains of Virginia. Disjunct populations occur in southeastern Arizona and extreme southeastern California into Baja California Norte. In Kansas, it appeared within the last 50 years.

== Habitat ==
Hispid cotton rats occupy a wide variety of habitats within their range, but are not randomly distributed among microhabitats. They are strongly associated with grassy patches with some shrub overstory and they have little or no affinity for dicot-dominated patches. Habitat use and preference by hispid cotton rats usually appear to depend on the density of monocots. However, some studies are equivocal on the importance of other vegetation. For example, hispid cotton rats may respond favorably to a high percentage of dicots in a stand if cover remains optimal. In Kansas, hispid cotton rats increased on root-plowed prairie that experienced an increase in the diversity and biomass of early successional forbs.

Male hispid cotton rats exhibit a lower degree of habitat selectivity than females. In Texas, males were found on different habitat types (grassy, shrubby, and mixed) about in proportion to availability; females tended to choose mixed habitats more often than expected based on availability. Habitat use varies with season and breeding status. In Texas, grassy areas with some shrubs were preferred in spring and areas with more shrubby cover were preferred in fall.

In Kansas, remnant prairie the preferred habitat of hispid cotton rats has dense undergrowth and an upper layer of protective vegetation such as big bluestem (Andropogon gerardii)/kochia (Kochia scoparia)/annual sunflower (Helianthus annuus). Hispid cotton rats prefer grassy clearings, croplands, overgrown fields, and overgrown roadsides and right-of-ways. In Kansas prairies hispid cotton rats occur at relatively high abundance in ungrazed uplands and sandy mixed-grass native prairie, but also prefer disturbed areas.

The use of disturbed areas was probably important in the recent invasion of hispid cotton rats into north-central Kansas from the northern presettlement limit of their range in Oklahoma. On Texas rangelands, hispid cotton rats appeared to respond to increased biomass of standing crop and increases in the proportion of the standing crop in potential food plants such as bristlegrasses (Setaria spp.). Rat density was four times greater on areas planted to exotic grasses including King Range bluestem (Bothriochloa ischaemum) and buffel grass (Enchrus ciliaris) than on native range dominated by windmill grass (Chloris spp.) and Texas wintergrass (Stipa leucotricha).

In northeastern Kansas, hispid cotton rats occurred at high population densities in tallgrass prairie (dominated by perennial grasses); population density declined to levels too low to accurately estimate over 28 years of succession to brush and trees. They are occasionally found in habitats dominated by early successional grassland species (i.e., annual grasses and forbs).

Hispid cotton rats occur in grassy areas or early-successional habitats within open woods. In the Southeast hispid cotton rat population density increases with the density of broomsedge (Andropogon virginicus) and other low growing plants, but declines with succession to brush and trees. In Texas pine-hardwood forests, hispid cotton rats were captured most often in narrow streamside management zones which have more light and thus more ground cover, and slightly less often in wider zones. In longleaf pine-slash pine stands of central Louisiana hispid cotton rats were captured in sawtimber, sapling, and regeneration stands but not in pole-sized timber; stands with surface cover were more likely to support hispid cotton rats. Pole-sized timber is dense, little light reaches the ground, and surface cover is minimal. In Louisiana and Mississippi, hispid cotton rats were more numerous in cut than in uncut bottomland hardwoods. They were also more numerous in cottonwood (Populus spp.) plantations than in uncut cottonwood stands. In northern Georgia intensive site preparation following clearcutting of pine-hardwood mixtures increases forage production and increased numbers of small mammals (presumably including hispid cotton rats).

In Colorado, hispid cotton rats occupy semimoist areas with abundant grasses and weeds and appear to be restricted to relatively warm areas. In New Mexico, hispid cotton rats do not occur regularly in areas with a mean annual temperature lower than 55 degrees Fahrenheit (13 °C) and a growing season shorter than 180 days. In Trans-Pecos, Texas, hispid cotton rats occur at the warmer, low elevations in areas of moderate to dense grassy cover.

When water and wastewater are added to baldcypress (Taxodium distichum var. distichum) domes, small mammals including hispid cotton rat move to peripheral areas that are drier. The rising water tables favor marsh rice rats (Oryzomys palustris) over hispid cotton rats.

Cameron and McClure compiled reports of hispid cotton rat population densities. The mean hispid cotton rat population density range for all studies was 5.3 to 31.1 rats per hectare. Population density ranges in Texas include 1 to 14 rats per hectare in coastal prairie, 17 to 84 rats per hectare in unmowed right-of-ways, 9 to 29 rats per hectare in old fields, 6 to 54 rats per hectare in abandoned fields, and 0.7 to 5 rats per hectare in grass-prickly-pear (Opuntia spp.). In Florida population density ranges include 0 to 24 rats per hectare in sand pine scrub, 2 to 47 rats per hectare in pine flatwoods, and 27 to 94 rats per hectare in tropical hammock. In Kansas, the hispid cotton rat density ranged from 0.2 to 21 rats per hectare in grassland; the highest estimated density was 65.4 hispid cotton rats per hectare in favored habitat.

In a study of the effects of habitat patchiness on movement, hispid cotton rats preferred only the largest patches which were 165 feet (50 m) by 330 feet (50×100 m). Patches were established by mowing strips between blocks of grasses. Hispid cotton rats were present in intermediate numbers on medium-sized patches which were 39.6 by 79.2 feet (12.1 by 24.1 metres), but were so scarce on the smallest patches that their movement pattern could not be analyzed.

In Kansas remnant prairie, the average annual home range of adult male hispid cotton rat was estimated as 0.969 acres (0.392 hectares) and that of adult females as 0.543 acres (0.220 hectares). The greatest distance traveled by an adult male was 330 feet (100 m) and by an adult female was 250.9 feet (76.5 m). In Texas male hispid cotton rats also had larger home ranges than females. Home ranges were larger in summer and winter than in spring and fall. Home range size was positively correlated with body mass and negatively correlated with population density. There was a relatively high degree of exclusivity (41%), indicating intolerance of conspecifics, particularly of the same sex. In Texas hispid cotton rats found their original home ranges (homed) from displacements of up to 5,000 feet (1,500 m). Returns were relatively high from displacements of up to 990 feet (300 m), suggesting that hispid cotton rats are familiar with the area within that distance. Hispid cotton rats released in areas with no cover homed better than hispid cotton rats released in typical hispid cotton rat habitat. Spencer and others used site fidelity as a measure of an individual's actual home range and concluded that hispid cotton rats have both single-day and multiday site fidelity and therefore establish true home ranges.

=== Cover requirements ===
On the southern Coastal Plain, hispid cotton rats use gopher tortoise (Gopherus polyphemus) burrows for shelter in sandhill scrub dominated by longleaf pine, bluejack oak (Quercus incana) and sand post oak (Q. stellata ssp. margaretta).

=== Plant communities ===
Hispid cotton rats occur in mesquite (Prosopis spp.) bosques in Arizona and New Mexico. On the Coastal Plain, hispid cotton rats occupy the periphery of central ponds and more distant ecotonal areas of bald cypress (Taxodium distichum) swamps. Hispid cotton rats are abundant in fallow rice fields in Texas, primarily near heavily overgrown canal banks and levees.

In Florida, hispid cotton rats are common in sabal palm (Sabal palmetto)-coconut palm (Cocos nucifera) savanna. In the Southeast, hispid cotton rats prefer grassy understories of fire-maintained loblolly pine-shortleaf pine (Pinus taeda-P. echinata) and longleaf pine-slash pine (P. palustris-P. elliottii) stands.

In Florida, sand pine (P. clausa) scrub has been invaded by hispid cotton rats for short periods. Reasons for the invasion were not clear, but were probably related to increased population densities in nearby optimum habitat (pine flatwoods with a dense ground cover of grasses and herbs). Sand pine scrub has little ground cover and is marginal habitat for hispid cotton rats.

== Behavior and biology ==
Hispid cotton rats are mainly nocturnal, but activity has been observed at all hours. Activity patterns appear to be influenced by both biotic and abiotic factors. They are active year-round. Populations usually exhibit a bimodal breeding season, with peak litter production occurring in late spring and late summer-early fall. Reproductive peaks in March and June for hispid cotton rats; all trapped females were pregnant from March through July, but none was breeding in November and December. They do not breed in the coldest winter months. In Kansas, breeding is restricted to the frost-free months.

A nest is constructed by the female either on the ground surface or in a burrow. Nests are cup- to ball-shaped and woven of grasses. Hispid cotton rats in the northern parts of their range make thicker and denser nests, but not larger, than those of southern hispid cotton rats.

Gestation in hispid cotton rats lasts about 27 days. Litter sizes range from one to 15 young, with larger litters more typical of northern populations and also of late-season litters. Neonates are well developed; they are mobile and lightly furred, but their eyes are not open. The eyes open around 18 to 36 hours after birth. They are weaned in 10 to 15 days and reach minimum adult size by about 41 days.

Some male hispid cotton rats are sexually mature by 60 days; some females are receptive by 30 to 40 days. The earliest recorded pregnancy was at 38 days. These rats have been noted as one of the most prolific mammals in the Southeast. Females bear two to several litters per year depending on latitude and local weather. Females mate within 24 hours of giving birth.

Hispid cotton rat populations are largely sedentary; population density depends mainly on current reproductive effort and not as strongly on immigration. In Kansas remnant prairie, hispid cotton rat population density was highest in fall and early winter and lowest in spring and early summer. In the northernmost parts of hispid cotton rat range, severe weather is associated with rapid population declines and local extinctions. In Kansas, most mortality was associated with severe weather in March and April. Populations in the northern part of hispid cotton rat range experience dramatic declines in the nonbreeding season. In many areas, local extinction is frequent. In Georgia, their spring abundance in old fields was lowest following drought and extreme winter cold. The reductions in populations were associated with sharp declines in vegetative biomass and cover.

In Georgia, a density of 15 hispid cotton rats per acre was considered the predator-limited carrying capacity. Mammalian predators did not have a substantial effect on population density. At densities higher than 15 per acre, mortality was high; below 15 rats per acre, predator-caused mortality was low. When diverse and mobile predators are present, they are more important than food, social interaction, or weather in limiting hispid cotton rat density. Also in Georgia, one-acre (4,000 m^{2}) field enclosures protected from avian predators (covered with a net) were monitored for the effect of avian predators on breeding hispid cotton rat populations. The presence of the cover had no effect on seasonal recruitment or spring-summer mortality; however, autumn-winter mortality was greatly reduced with the cover in place. Avian predators, then, are apparently more important than mammalian predators. In addition, nonbreeding (winter) populations suffer substantial losses from predation, whereas breeding populations are either able to compensate by replacing lost individuals, are less vulnerable to predation, or both.

=== Diet ===
Hispid cotton rats are omnivorous, but the major portion of their diet consists of green vegetation. They occasionally consume insects and other small animals. Field observations of hispid cotton rat diet indicate that preferred foods are the stems, foliage, and seeds of crop and wild plants. Golley reported that in the Southeast, perennial legumes and broomsedge comprised a large portion of the diet of hispid cotton rats. They also consumed roots and tubers. In Texas hispid cotton rat diets always included the lower green stems of grasses (which are relatively low in nutritive value); raspberries (Rubus spp.), privet (Ligustrum spp.) fruits, and leaves of fogfruits (Phyla spp.) were consumed as available.

== Predators ==
Hispid cotton rats are preyed on by many birds and reptiles, and by other mammals. In Oklahoma hispid cotton rats were a major prey item in the diet of Swainson's hawks (Buteo swainsoni). In central Missouri hispid cotton rats comprised 19% of prey items in red-tailed hawk (Buteo jamaicensis) nests. Hispid cotton rat remains comprised a substantial portion of short-eared owl (Asio flammeus) pellets in Arkansas. Hispid cotton rats were the third most important prey item of red wolves (Canis rufus) in eastern Texas and Louisiana. In North Carolina, bobcats (Lynx rufus) consumed substantial numbers of hispid cotton rats. Hispid cotton rats were a minor item in the diet of Florida panthers (Felis concolor coryi). In north-central Florida the only direct evidence of predation on hispid cotton rats was the presence of hispid cotton rat remains in a barred owl (Strix varia) pellet. The authors also observed a corn snake (Elaphe guttata guttata) killing a hispid cotton rat just after the rat was released from a trap. The snake apparently had been waiting on the runway where the trap had been set.
