= List of mammals of Central America =

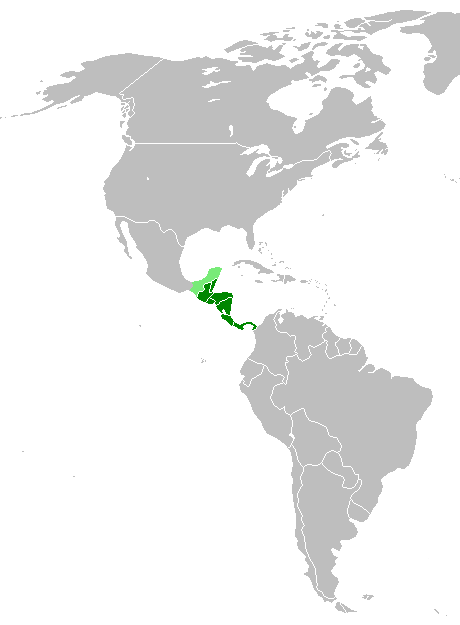
Central America, as defined for this article

This is a list of the native wild mammal species recorded in Central America. Central America is usually defined as the southernmost extension of North America; however, from a biological standpoint it is useful to view it as a separate region of the Americas. Central America is distinct from the remainder of North America in being a tropical region, part of the Neotropical realm, whose flora and fauna display a strong South American influence. The rest of North America is mostly subtropical or temperate, belongs to the Nearctic realm, and has far fewer species of South American origin.

At present, Central America bridges North and South America, facilitating migrations in both directions, but this phenomenon is relatively recent from a geological perspective. The formation of this land bridge through volcanic activity three million years ago precipitated the Great American Interchange, an important biogeographical event. In part because of this history, Central America is extremely biodiverse; it comprises most of the Mesoamerican biodiversity hotspot. The mountains running down the spine of Central America have also contributed to biodiversity by creating montane habitats, including cloud forests and grasslands, and by separating species from the lowlands along the Pacific and Caribbean coasts. However, Central America's biodiversity suffered a blow in the Quaternary extinction event, which started around 12,500 cal BP, at roughly the time of arrival of Paleoindians; much of the megafauna died out at this time. The effects of modern human activities on climate and ecosystem integrity pose a further threat to Central America's fauna.

This list consists of those mammal species found from the Isthmus of Tehuantepec to the northwestern border of Colombia, a region including the Mexican states of Chiapas, Tabasco, Campeche, Yucatán, and Quintana Roo, as well as the nations of Belize, Guatemala, El Salvador, Honduras, Nicaragua, Costa Rica, and Panama. As of May 2012, the list contains 378 species, 177 genera, 47 families and 13 orders. Of the taxa from nonflying, nonmarine groups (203 species, 91 genera, 31 families and 10 orders), those of South American origin (opossums, xenarthrans, monkeys and caviomorph rodents) comprise 21% of species, 34% of genera, 52% of families and 50% of orders. Thus, South America's contribution to Central America's biodiversity is fairly modest at the species level, but substantial at higher taxonomic levels. In comparison to South America, a famously biodiverse continent, Central America has 27% as many species, 51% as many genera, 81% as many families and 86% as many orders (considering noncetacean taxa only), while having only 4.3% of the land area.

Of the species, two are extinct, eleven are critically endangered, thirteen are endangered, twenty are vulnerable, twenty are near threatened, thirty-five are data deficient and five are not yet evaluated. (Note: This list is derived from the IUCN Red List which lists species of mammals. The taxonomy and naming of the individual species is based on those used in existing Wikipedia articles as of 21 May 2007 and supplemented by the common names and taxonomy from the IUCN, Smithsonian Institution, or University of Michigan where no Wikipedia article was available.) Mammal species presumed extinct since AD 1500 (two cases) are included. Domestic species and introduced species are not listed.

Note: this list is almost inevitably going to be incomplete, since new species are continually being recognized via discovery or reclassification. Places to check for missing species include the Wikipedia missing mammal species list, including recently removed entries, and the species listings in the articles for mammalian genera, especially those of small mammals such as rodents or bats.

The following tags are used to highlight each species' conservation status as assessed by the International Union for Conservation of Nature; those on the left are used here, those in the second column in some other articles:

EX	EX	Extinct	No reasonable doubt that the last individual has died.
EW	EW	Extinct in the wild	Known only to survive in captivity or as a naturalized population well outside its historic range.
CR	CR	Critically endangered	The species is in imminent danger of extinction in the wild.
EN	EN	Endangered	The species is facing a very high risk of extinction in the wild.
VU	VU	Vulnerable	The species is facing a high risk of extinction in the wild.
NT	NT	Near threatened	The species does not qualify as being at high risk of extinction but is likely to do so in the future.
LC	LC	Least concern	The species is not currently at risk of extinction in the wild.
DD	DD	Data deficient	There is inadequate information to assess the risk of extinction for this species.
NE	NE	Not evaluated	The conservation status of the species has not been studied.

The IUCN status of the listed species was last updated between November 2008 and March 2009.

== Subclass: Theria ==
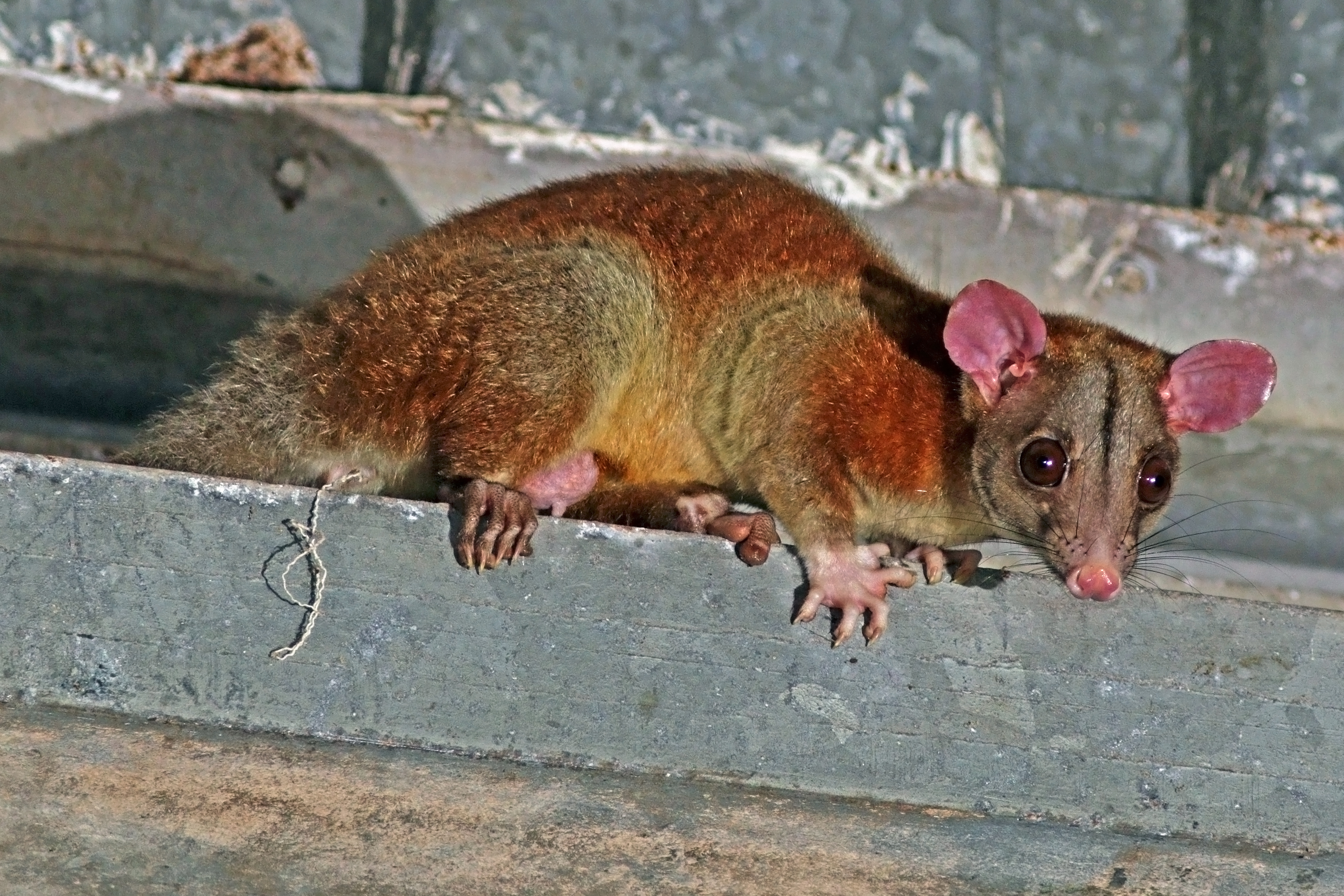
Derby's woolly opossum

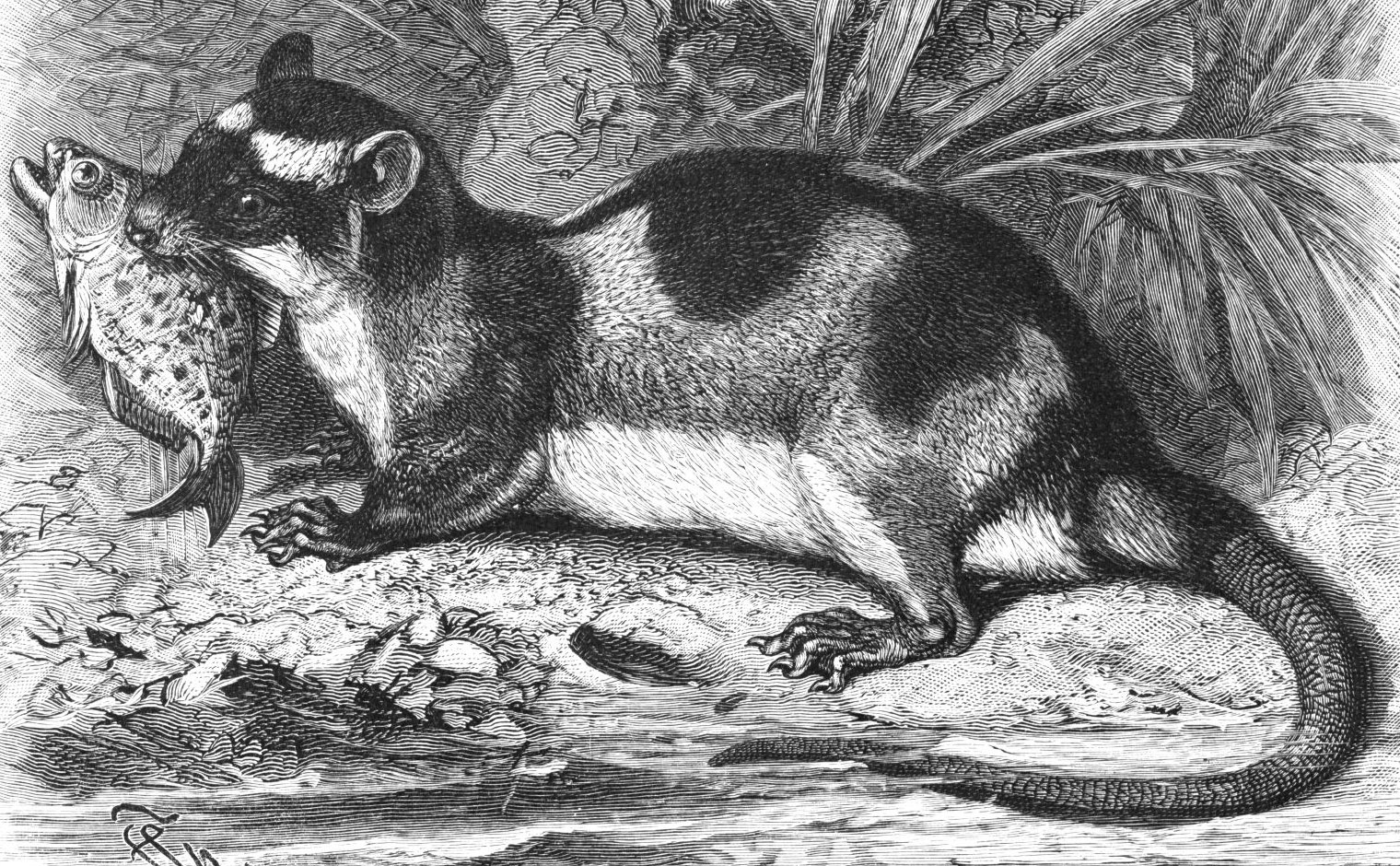
Water opossum

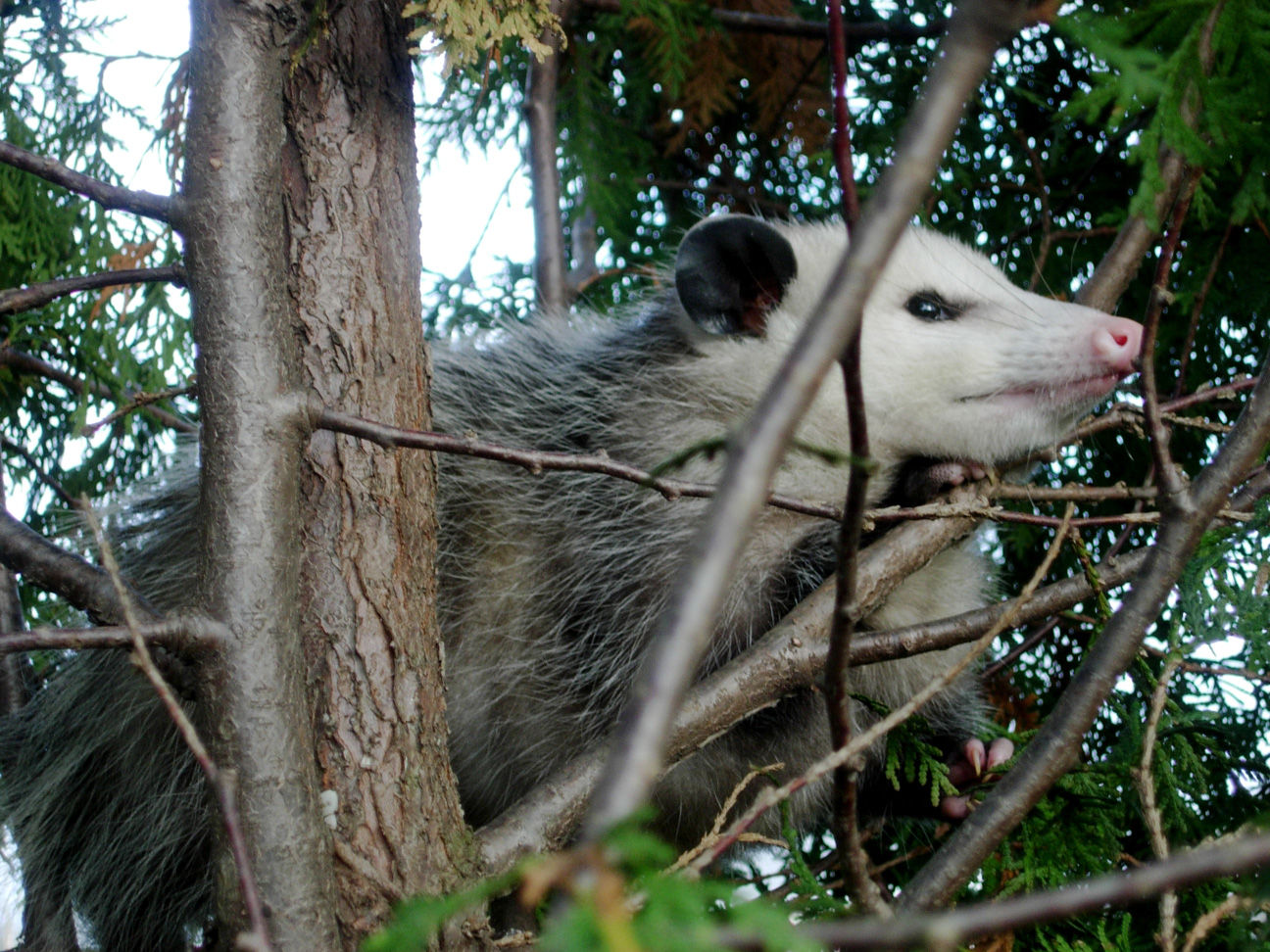
Virginia opossum

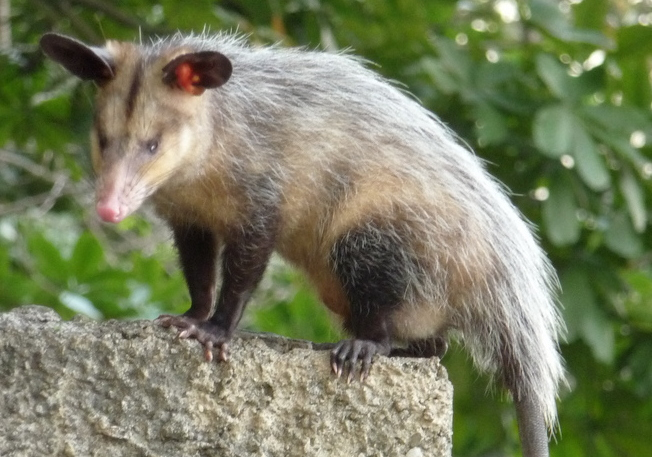
Common opossum

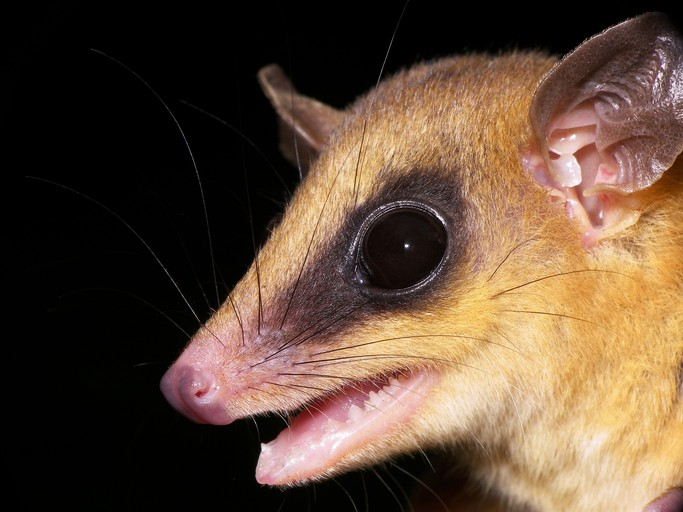
Robinson's mouse opossum

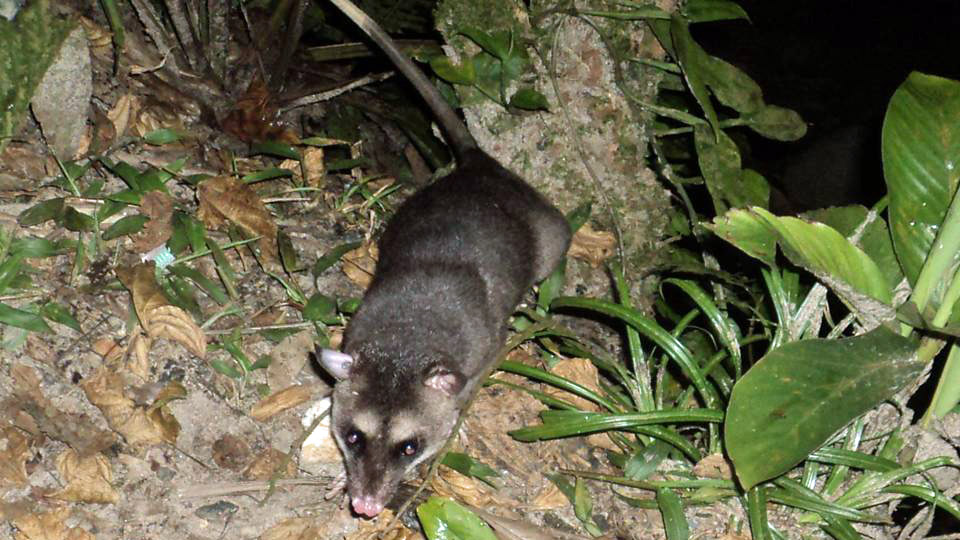
Gray four-eyed opossum

=== Infraclass: Metatheria ===
Marsupials are an infraclass of pouched mammals that was once more widely distributed. Today they are found primarily in isolated or formerly isolated continents of Gondwanan origin. Those of Central America are relatively recent immigrants from South America. Central America's 10 extant genera compares with 22 in South America, 1 in North America north of Mexico, 52 in Australia, 28 in New Guinea and 2 in Sulawesi. South American marsupials are thought to be ancestral to those of Australia and elsewhere.

==== Superorder: Ameridelphia ====
===== Order: Didelphimorphia (common opossums) =====
Didelphimorphia is the order of common opossums of the Western Hemisphere. Opossums probably diverged from the basic South American marsupials in the late Cretaceous or early Paleocene. They are small to medium-sized marsupials, about the size of a large house cat, with a long snout and prehensile tail.

- Family: Didelphidae (American opossums)
  - Subfamily: Caluromyinae
    - Genus: Caluromys
      - Derby's woolly opossum, C. derbianus LC
  - Subfamily: Didelphinae
    - Genus: Chironectes
      - Water opossum, Chironectes minimus LC
    - Genus: Didelphis
      - Common opossum, Didelphis marsupialis LC
      - Virginia opossum, Didelphis virginiana LC
    - Genus: Marmosa
      - Subgenus: Exulomarmosa
        - Isthmian mouse opossum, Marmosa isthmica
        - Mexican mouse opossum, Marmosa mexicana LC
        - Robinson's mouse opossum, Marmosa robinsoni LC
        - Marmosa zeledoni NE
      - Subgenus: Micoureus
        - Alston's mouse opossum, Marmosa alstoni LC
    - Genus: Marmosops
      - Panama slender opossum, Marmosops invictus LC
    - Genus: Metachirus
      - Brown four-eyed opossum, Metachirus nudicaudatus LC
    - Genus: Monodelphis
      - Sepia short-tailed opossum, Monodelphis adusta LC
    - Genus: Philander
      - Gray four-eyed opossum, Philander opossum LC
    - Genus: Tlacuatzin
      - Grayish mouse opossum, Tlacuatzin canescens LC

=== Infraclass: Eutheria ===
==== Superorder Afrotheria ====
===== Order: Sirenia (manatees and dugongs) =====
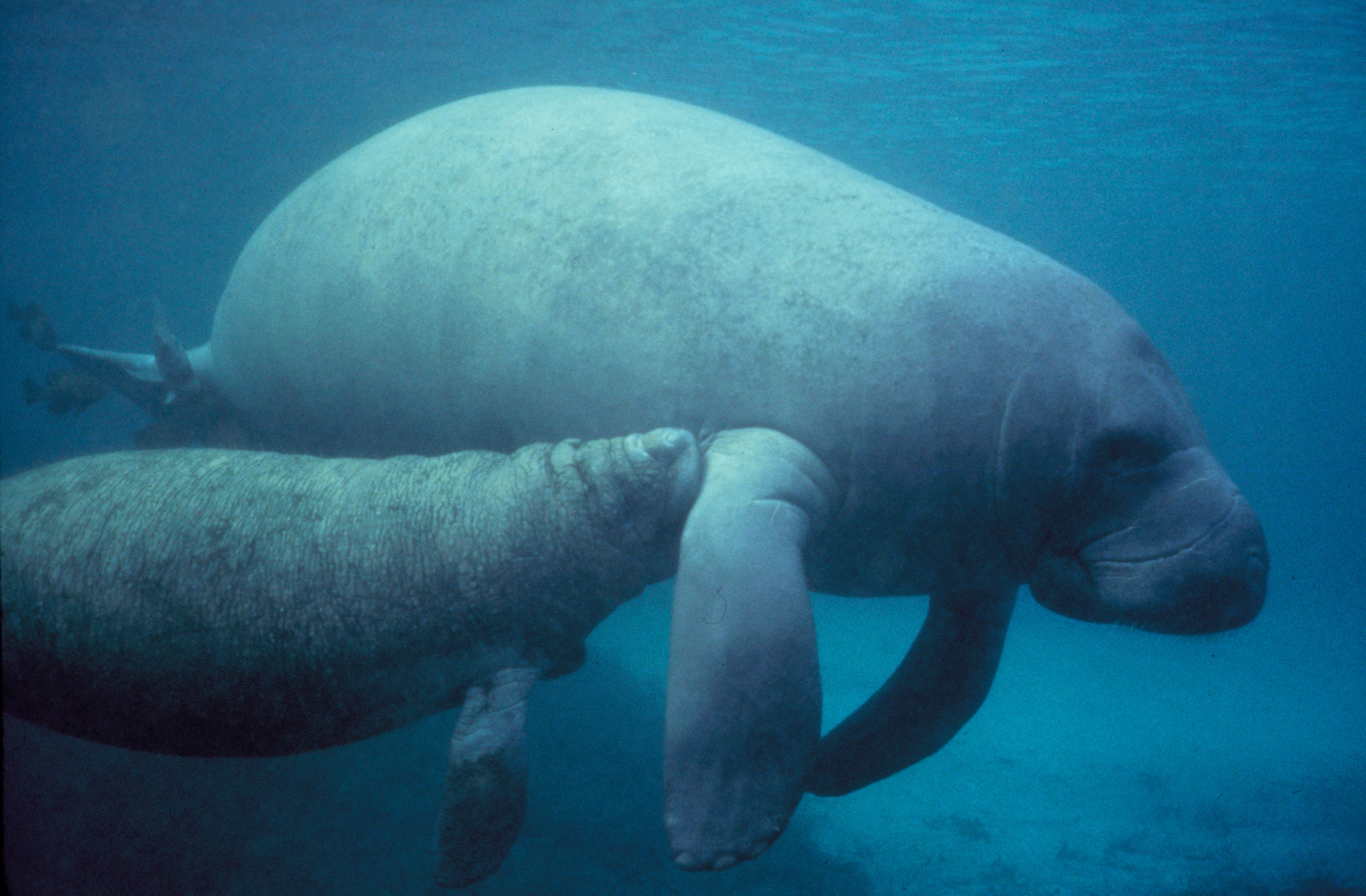
West Indian manatee

Sirenia is an order of fully aquatic, herbivorous mammals that inhabit rivers, estuaries, coastal marine waters, swamps, and marine wetlands. All four extant species are endangered. They evolved about 50 million years ago, and their closest living relatives are elephants. The manatees are the only extant afrotherians in the Americas. However, a number proboscid species, some of which survived until the arrival of Paleoindians, once inhabited the region. Mammoths, mastodons and gomphotheres all reached Central America.

- Family: Trichechidae
  - Genus: Trichechus
    - West Indian manatee, Trichechus manatus VU

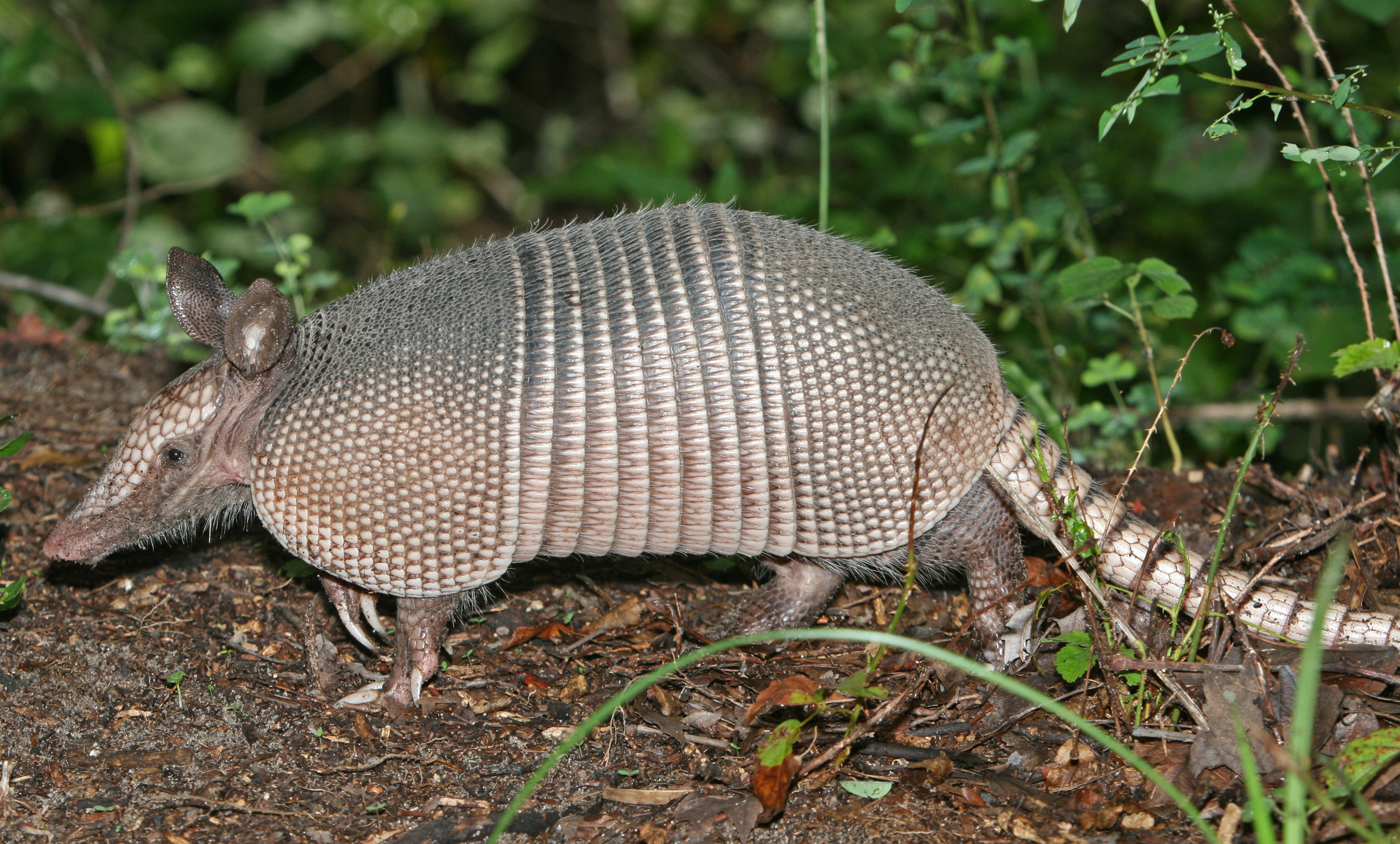
Nine-banded armadillo

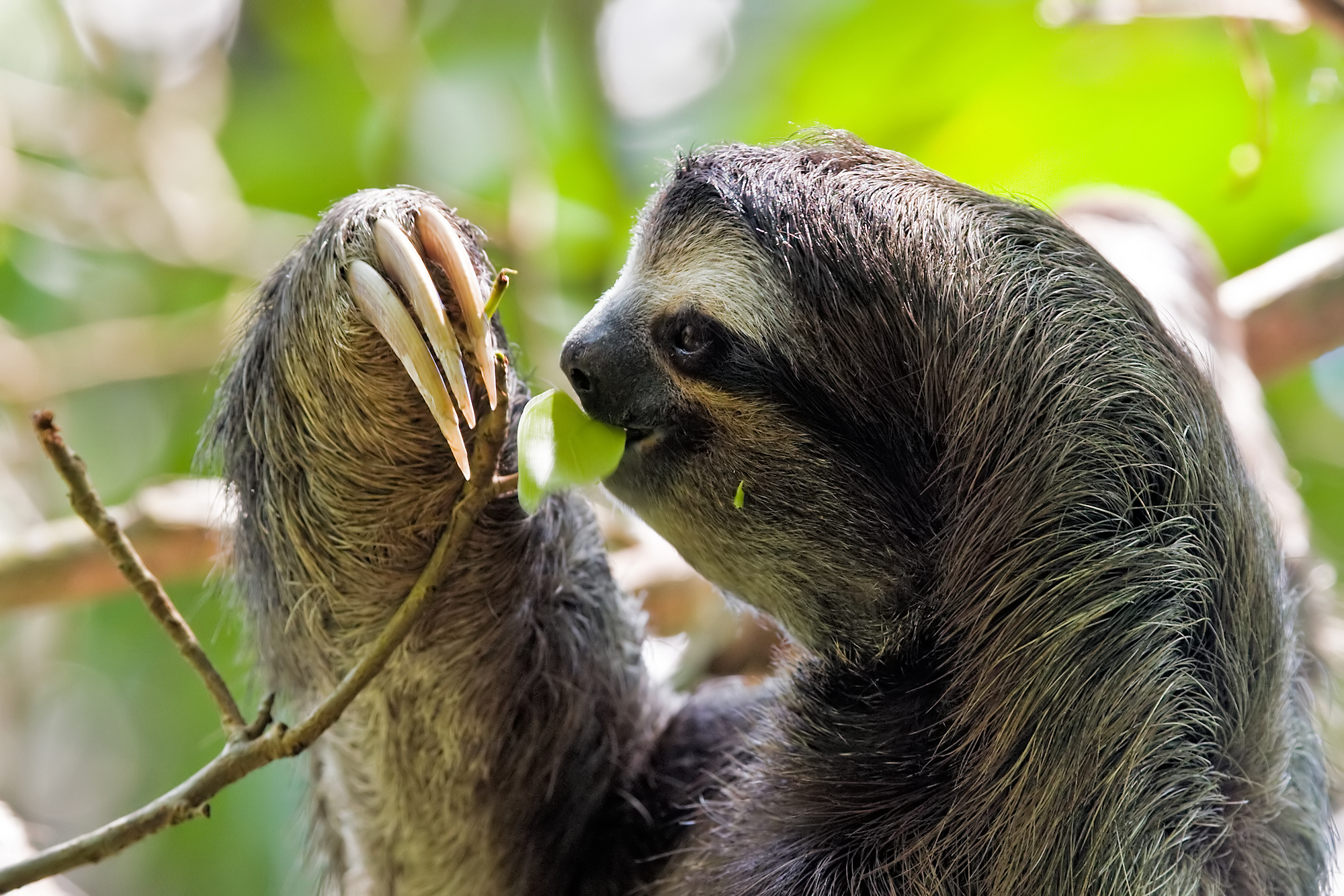
Brown-throated sloth

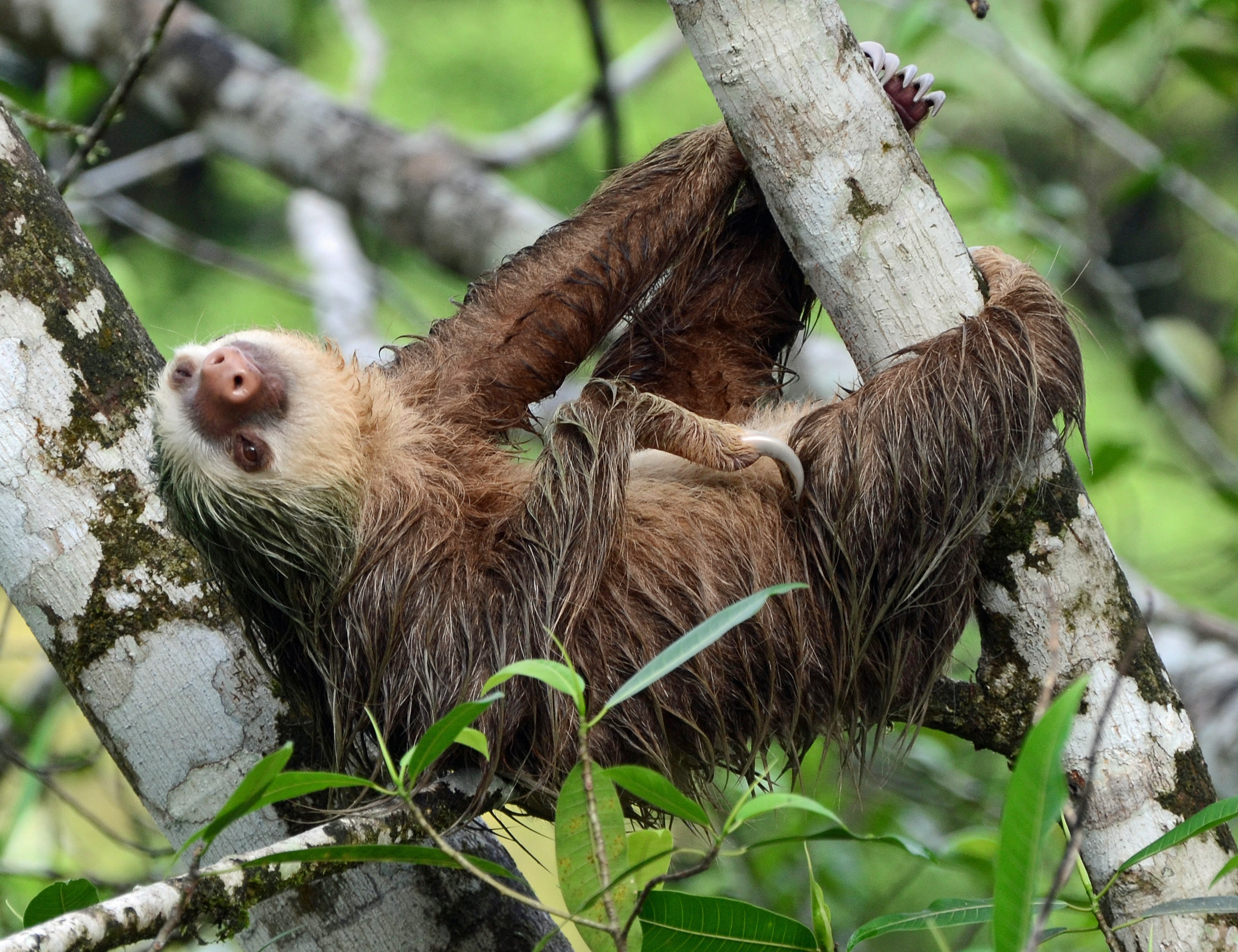
Hoffmann's two-toed sloth

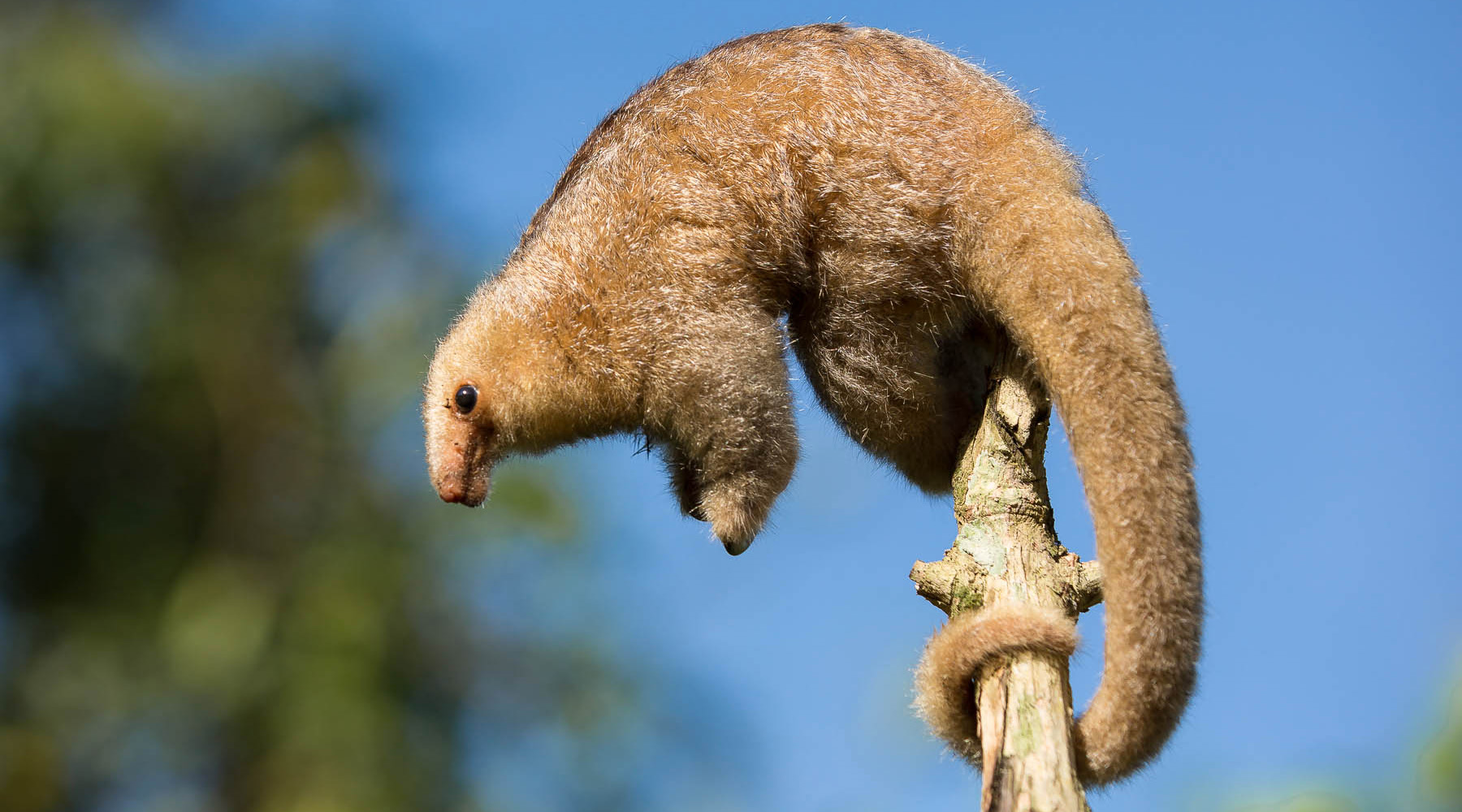
Silky anteater

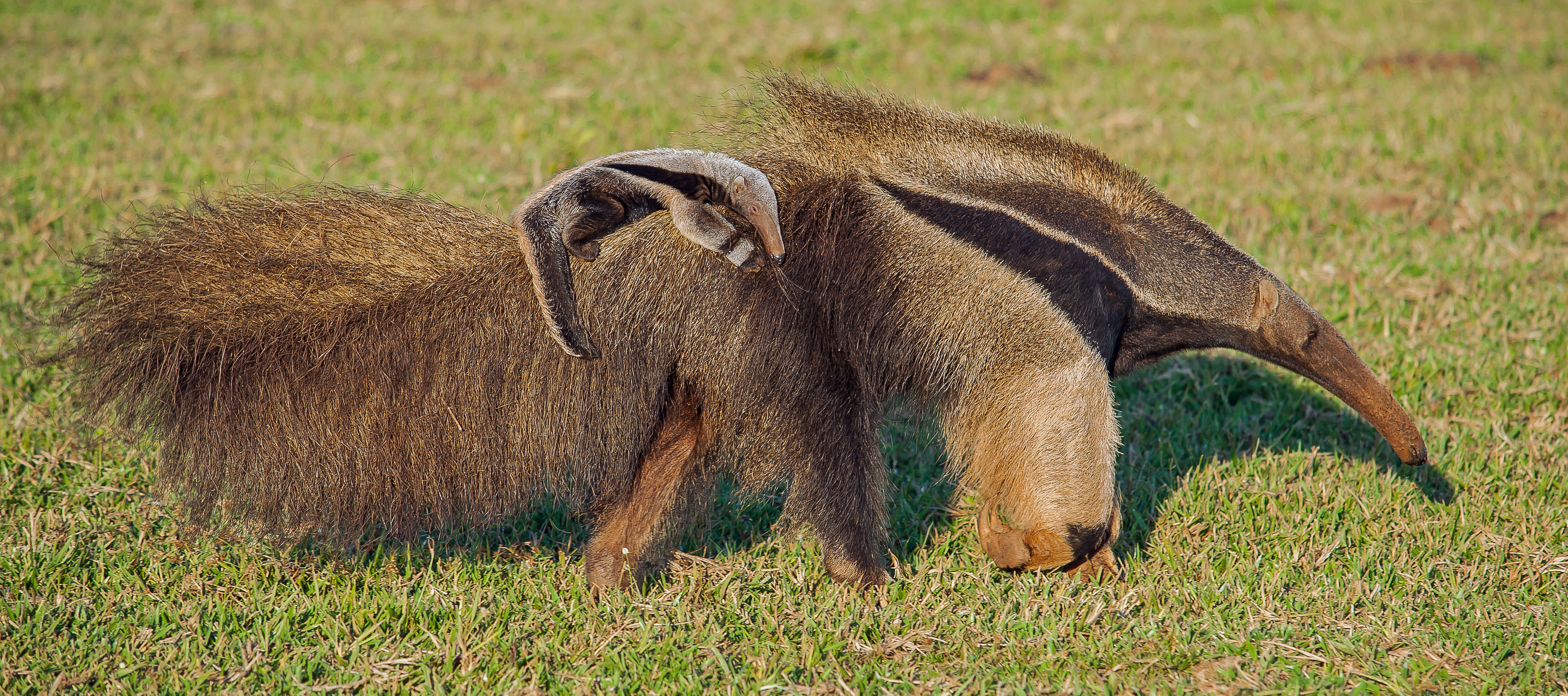
Giant anteater

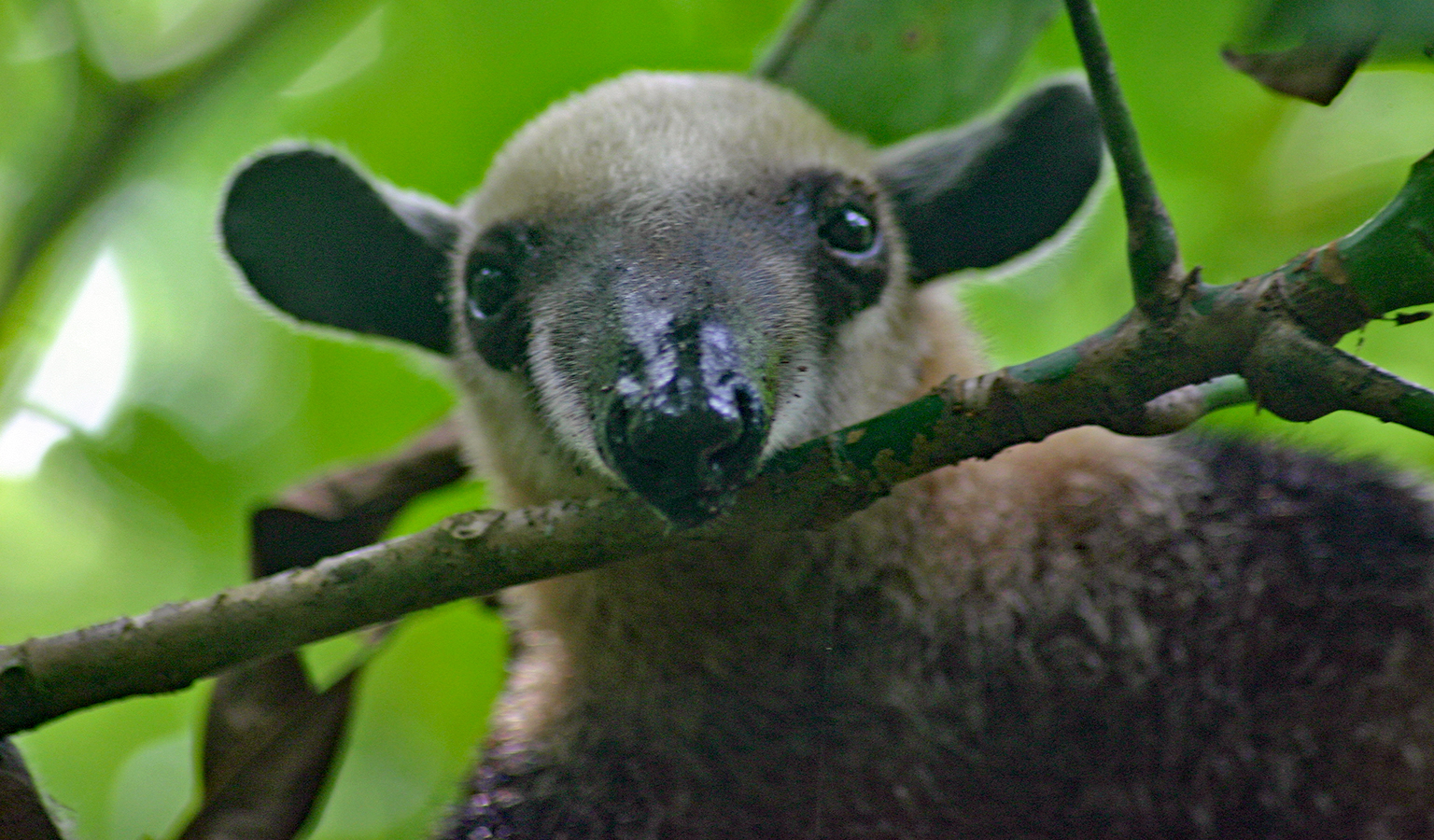
Northern tamandua

==== Superorder Xenarthra ====
===== Order: Cingulata (armadillos) =====
The armadillos are small mammals with a bony armored shell. Two of 21 extant species are present in Central America; the remainder are only found in South America, where they originated. Their much larger relatives, the pampatheres and glyptodonts, once lived in North and South America but became extinct following the appearance of humans.

- Family: Dasypodidae (long-nosed armadillos)
  - Subfamily: Dasypodinae
    - Genus: Dasypus
      - Nine-banded armadillo, D. novemcinctus LC
- Family: Chlamyphoridae (armadillos)
  - Subfamily: Tolypeutinae
    - Genus: Cabassous
      - Northern naked-tailed armadillo, C. centralis DD

===== Order: Pilosa (sloths and anteaters) =====
The order Pilosa is confined to the Americas and contains the tree sloths and anteaters (which include the tamanduas). Although their ancestral home is South America, all 5 extant genera and 6 of 10 extant species are present in Central America. Numerous ground sloths, some of which reached the size of elephants, were once present in both North and South America, as well as on the Antilles, but all went extinct following the arrival of humans. Extant two-toed sloths are more closely related to some extinct ground sloths than to three-toed sloths.

- Suborder: Folivora
  - Family: Bradypodidae (three-toed sloths)
    - Genus: Bradypus
      - Pygmy three-toed sloth, Bradypus pygmaeus CR
      - Brown-throated sloth, Bradypus variegatus LC
  - Family: Choloepodidae (two-toed sloths)
    - Genus: Choloepus
      - Hoffmann's two-toed sloth, Choloepus hoffmanni LC
- Suborder: Vermilingua
  - Family: Cyclopedidae (silky anteaters)
    - Genus: Cyclopes
      - Silky anteater, C. didactylus LC
      - Central American silky anteater, C. dorsalis NE
  - Family: Myrmecophagidae (American anteaters)
    - Genus: Myrmecophaga
      - Giant anteater, Myrmecophaga tridactyla VU
    - Genus: Tamandua
      - Northern tamandua, Tamandua mexicana LC

==== Superorder Euarchontoglires ====
===== Order: Primates =====
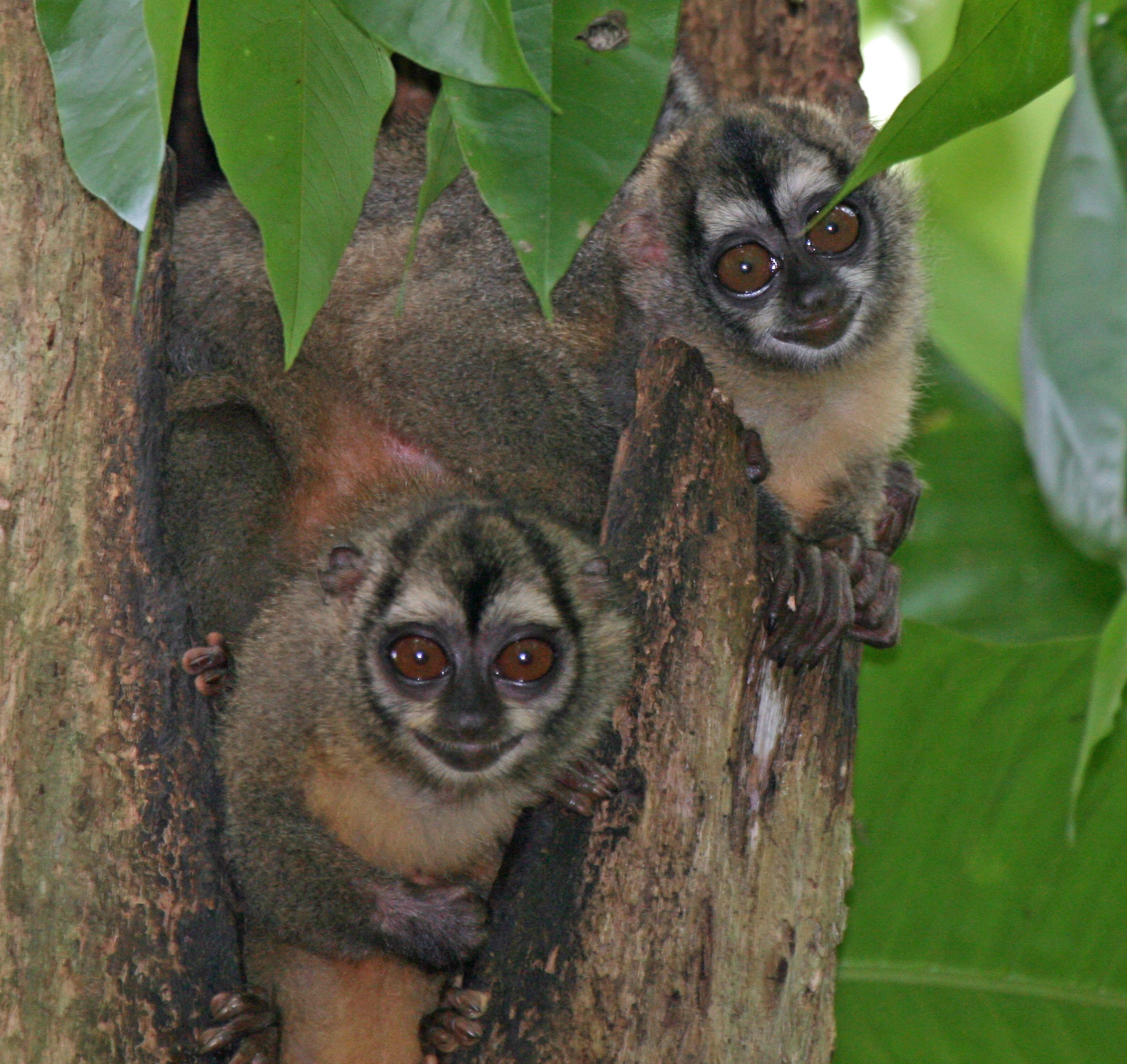
Panamanian night monkey

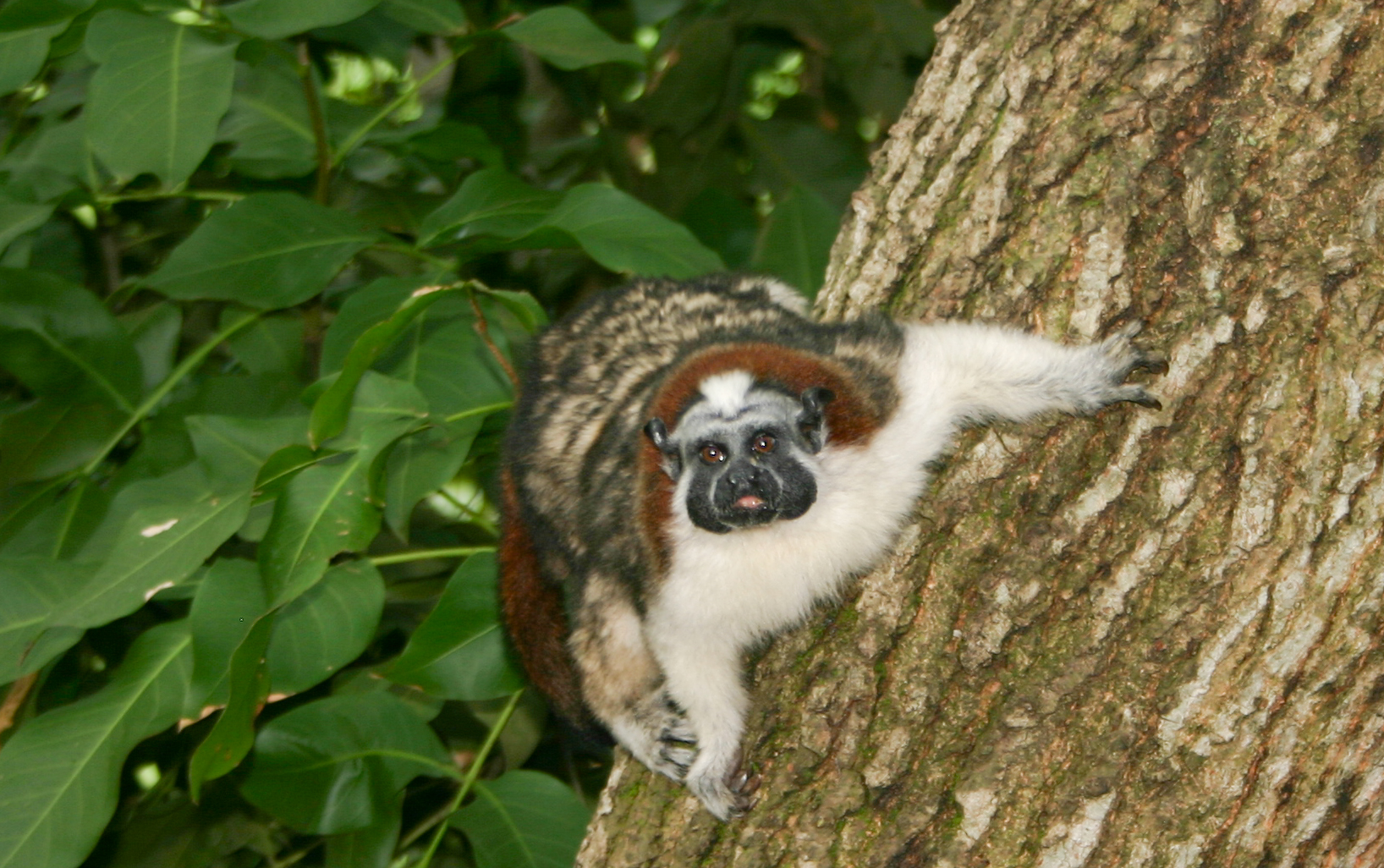
Geoffroy's tamarin

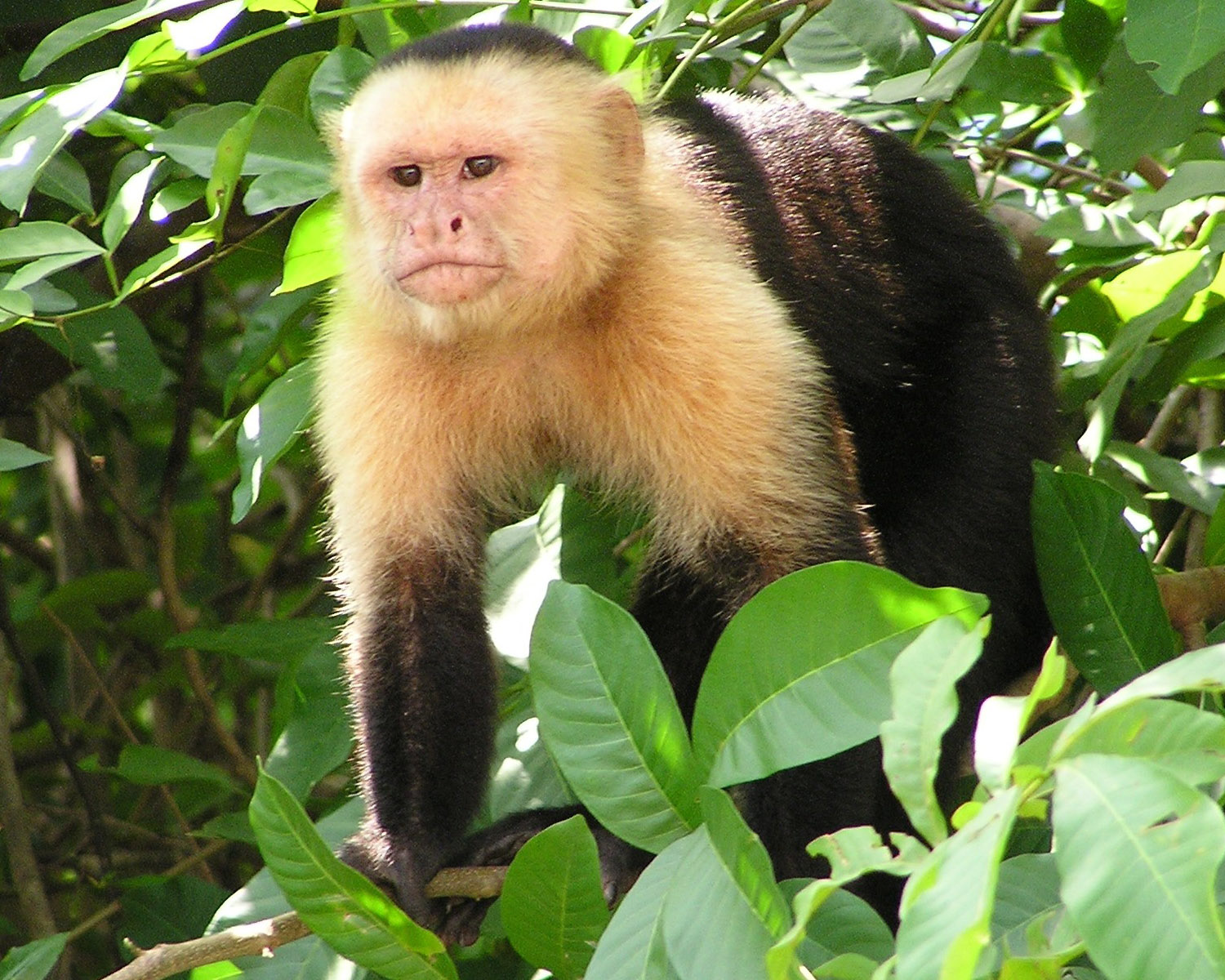
White-headed capuchin

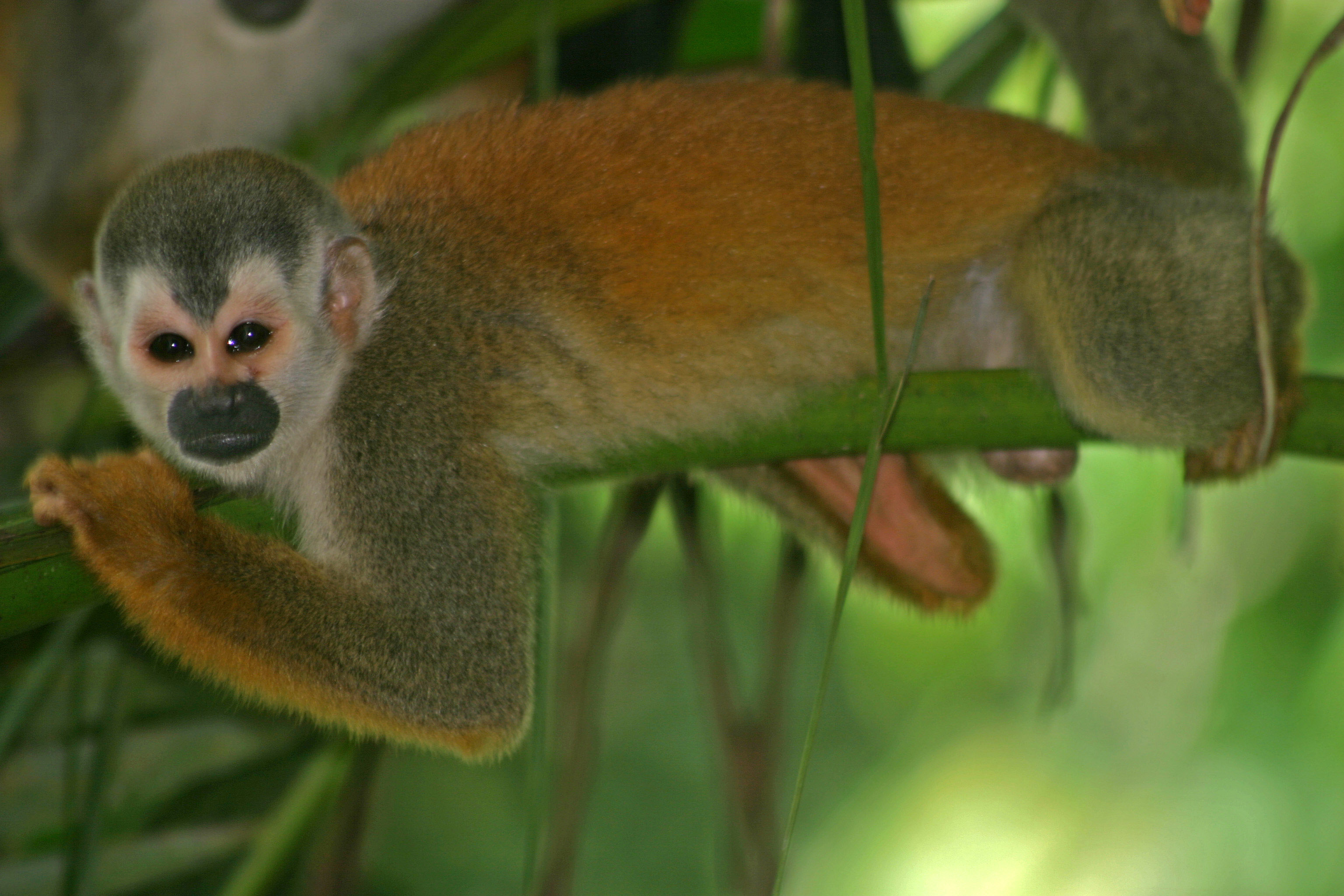
Central American squirrel monkey

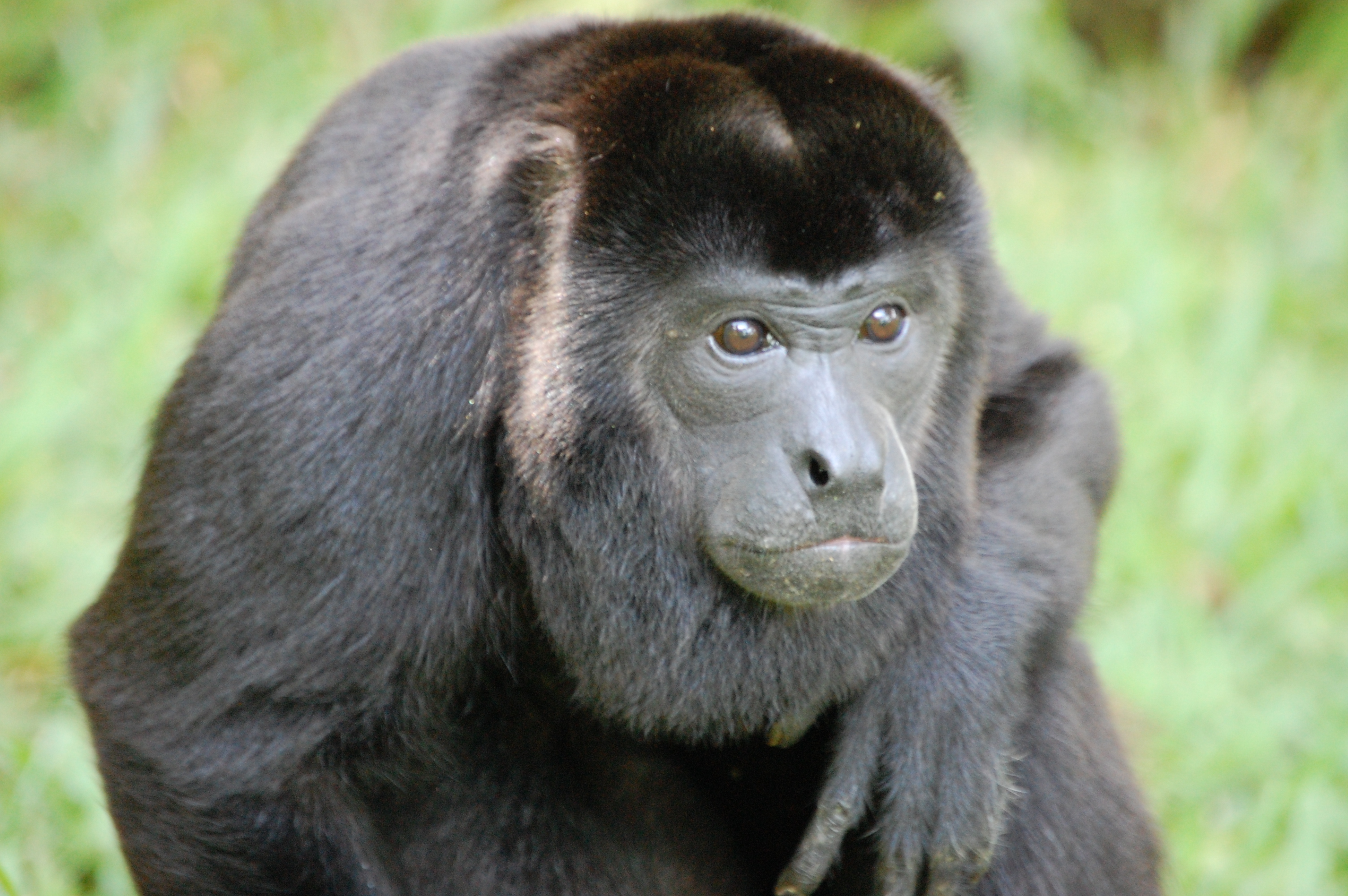
Mantled howler

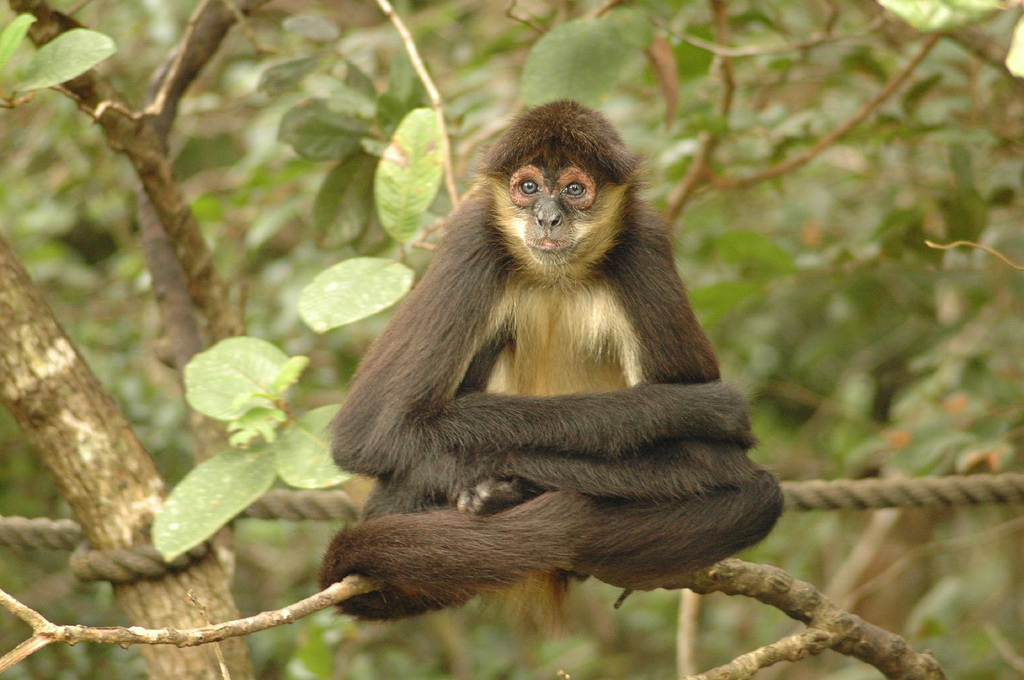
Geoffroy's spider monkey

The order Primates includes the lemurs, monkeys, and apes, with the latter category including humans. It is divided into four main groupings: strepsirrhines, tarsiers, monkeys of the New World (parvorder Platyrrhini), and monkeys and apes of the Old World. Central America's 6 genera of nonhuman primates compares with 20 in South America, 15 in Madagascar, 23 in Africa and 19 in Asia. Central American monkeys are recent immigrants from South America, where their ancestors arrived after rafting over from Africa 25 million years ago.

- Parvorder: Platyrrhini (New World monkeys)
  - Family: Aotidae (night monkeys)
      - Genus: Aotus
        - Panamanian night monkey, Aotus zonalis DD – may be A. lemurinus VU subspecies
  - Family: Callitrichidae (marmosets and tamarins)
      - Genus: Saguinus
        - Geoffroy's tamarin, Saguinus geoffroyi LC
  - Family: Cebidae (capuchin and squirrel monkeys)
    - Subfamily: Cebinae
      - Genus: Cebus
        - Colombian white-faced capuchin, Cebus capucinus LC
        - Panamanian white-faced capuchin, Cebus imitator NE
    - Subfamily: Saimiriinae
      - Genus: Saimiri
        - Central American squirrel monkey, Saimiri oerstedii VU
  - Family: Atelidae (howler, spider and woolly monkeys)
    - Subfamily: Alouattinae
      - Genus: Alouatta
        - Coiba Island howler, Alouatta coibensis VU – may be A. palliata subspecies
        - Mantled howler, Alouatta palliata LC
        - Guatemalan black howler, Alouatta pigra EN
    - Subfamily: Atelinae
      - Genus: Ateles
        - Black-headed spider monkey, Ateles fusciceps CR
        - Geoffroy's spider monkey, Ateles geoffroyi EN

===== Order: Rodentia (rodents) =====
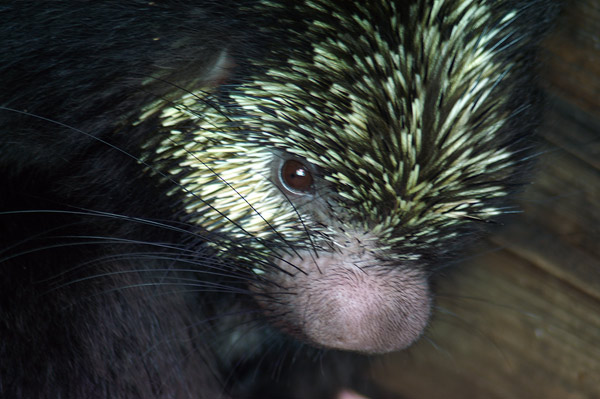
Mexican hairy dwarf porcupine

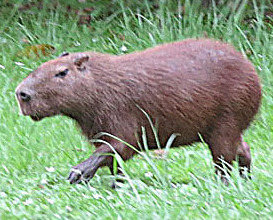
Lesser capybara

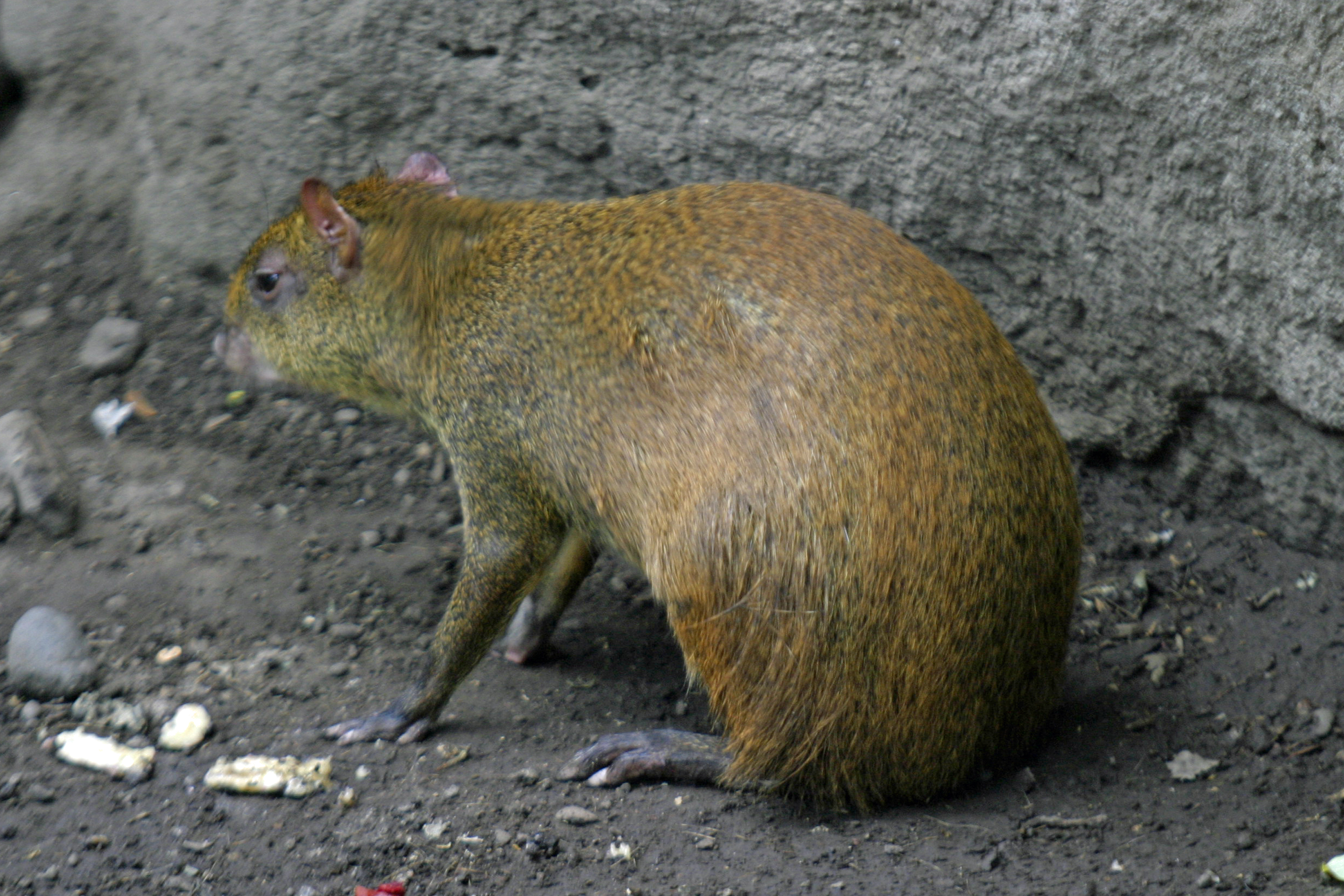
Central American agouti

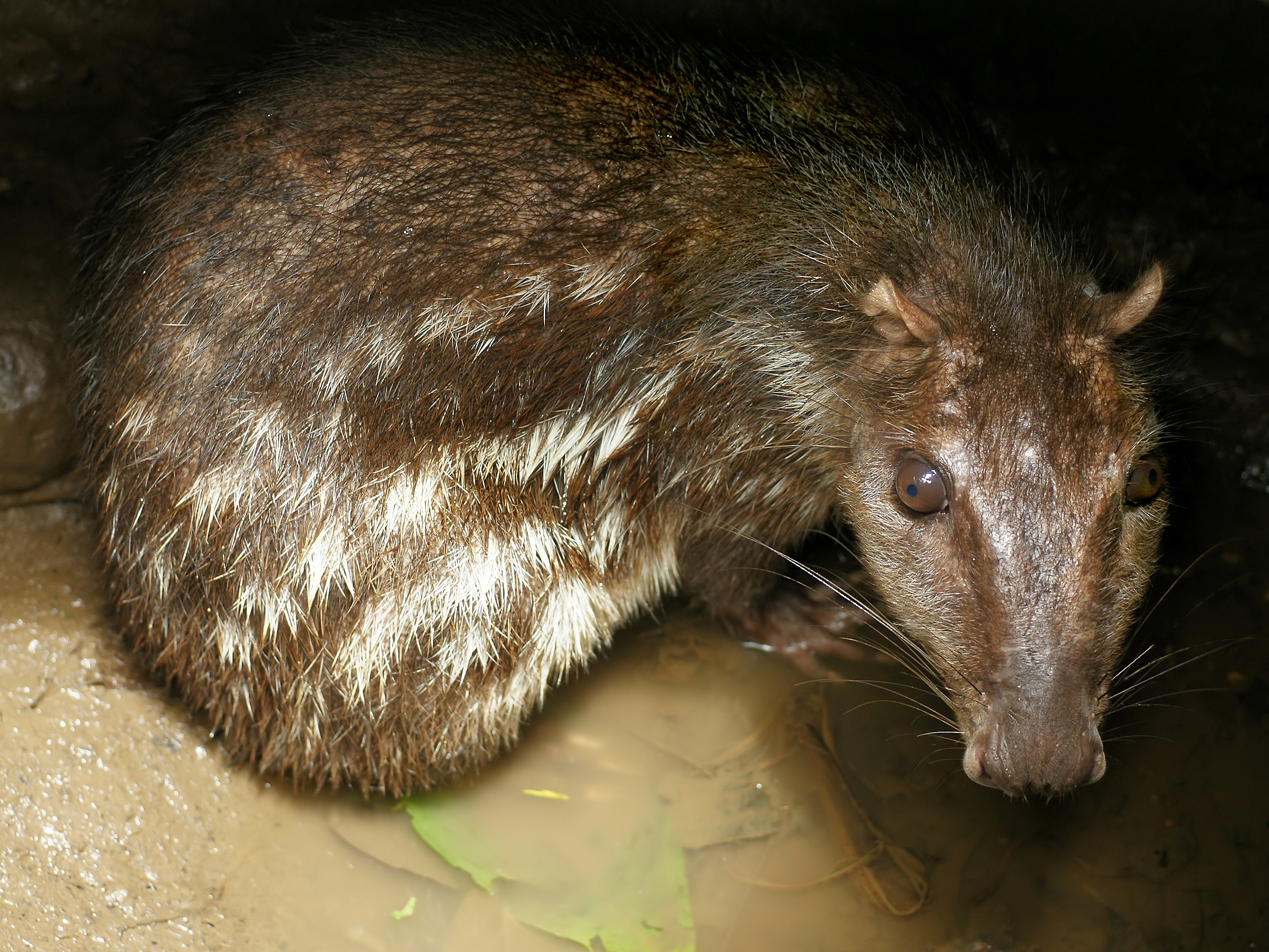
Lowland paca

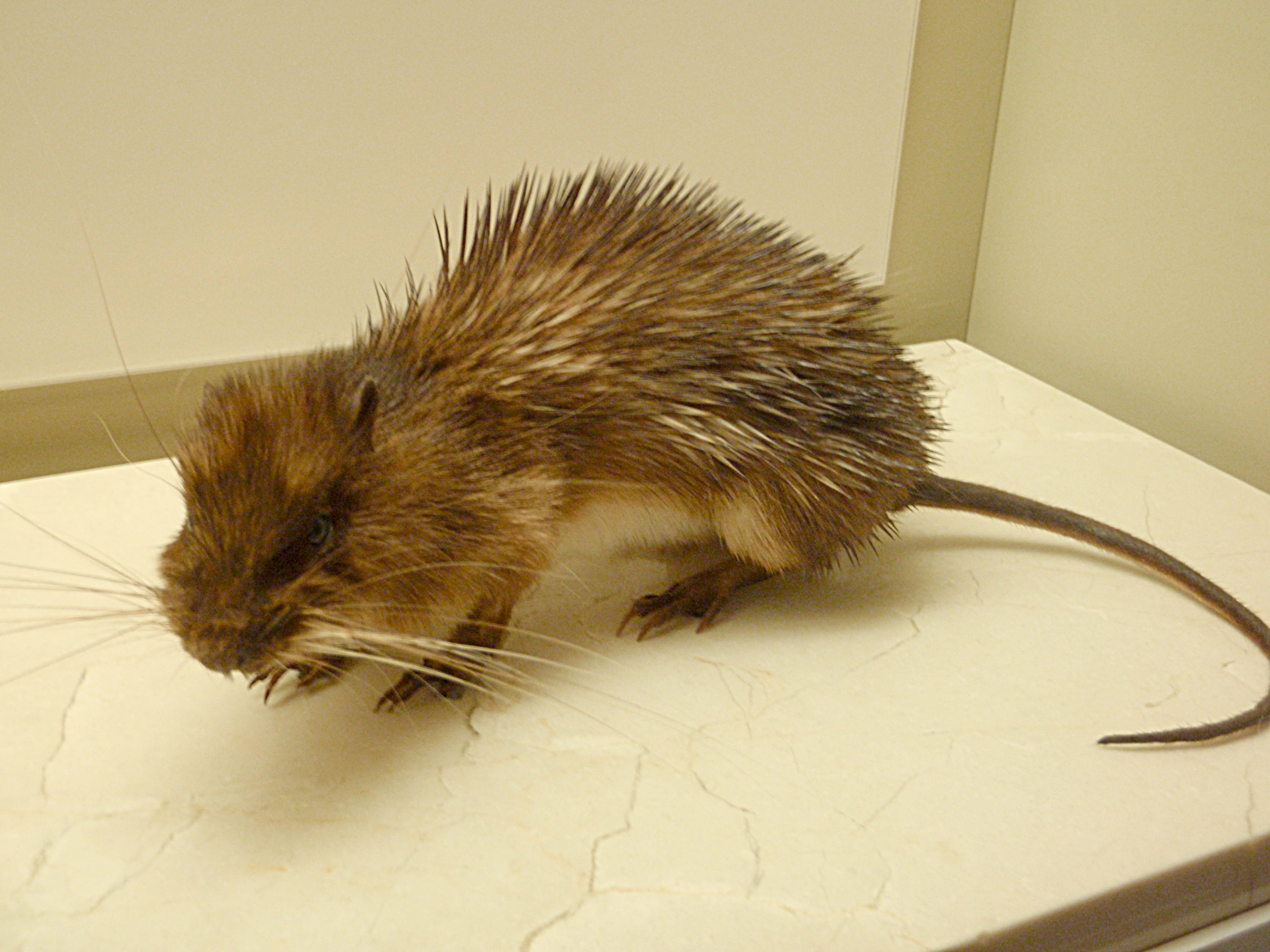
Armored rat

Rodents make up the largest order of mammals, with over 40% of mammalian species. They have two incisors in the upper and lower jaw which grow continually and must be kept short by gnawing. Most rodents are small, although the capybara can weigh up to 45 kg (99 lb). Central America's 11 species of caviomorph rodents (10% of its total rodent species) are recent immigrants from South America, where their ancestors washed ashore after rafting across the Atlantic from Africa over 30 million years ago. The remainder of Central America's rodents are of Nearctic origin. Ancestral sigmodontine rodents apparently island-hopped from Central America to South America 5 or more million years ago, prior to the formation of the Panamanian land bridge. They went on to diversify explosively, and now comprise 60% of South America's rodent species, while only making up 27% of Central America's. (Note: This is based on the definition of Sigmodontinae that excludes Neotominae and Tylomyinae.)

- Suborder: Hystricomorpha
  - Parvorder: Caviomorpha
    - Family: Erethizontidae (New World porcupines)
      - Subfamily: Erethizontinae
        - Genus: Coendou
          - Andean porcupine, Coendou quichua DD
          - Rothschild's porcupine, Coendou rothschildi LC
          - Mexican hairy dwarf porcupine, Coendou mexicanus LC
    - Family: Caviidae (guinea pigs)
      - Subfamily: Hydrochoerinae (capybaras and rock cavies)
        - Genus: Hydrochoerus
          - Lesser capybara, Hydrochoerus isthmius DD
    - Family: Dasyproctidae
        - Genus: Dasyprocta
          - Coiban agouti, Dasyprocta coibae VU
          - Mexican agouti, Dasyprocta mexicana CR
          - Central American agouti, Dasyprocta punctata LC
          - Ruatan Island agouti, Dasyprocta ruatanica EN
    - Family: Cuniculidae
        - Genus: Cuniculus
          - Lowland paca, Cuniculus paca LC
    - Family: Echimyidae
      - Subfamily: Echimyinae
        - Genus: Diplomys
          - Rufous soft-furred spiny-rat, Diplomys labilis LC
      - Subfamily: Eumysopinae
        - Genus: Hoplomys
          - Armored rat, Hoplomys gymnurus LC
        - Genus: Proechimys
          - Tome's spiny-rat, Proechimys semispinosus LC
    - Family: Capromyidae
      - Subfamily: Capromyinae
        - Genus: Geocapromys
          - Little Swan Island hutia, †Geocapromys thoracatus EX

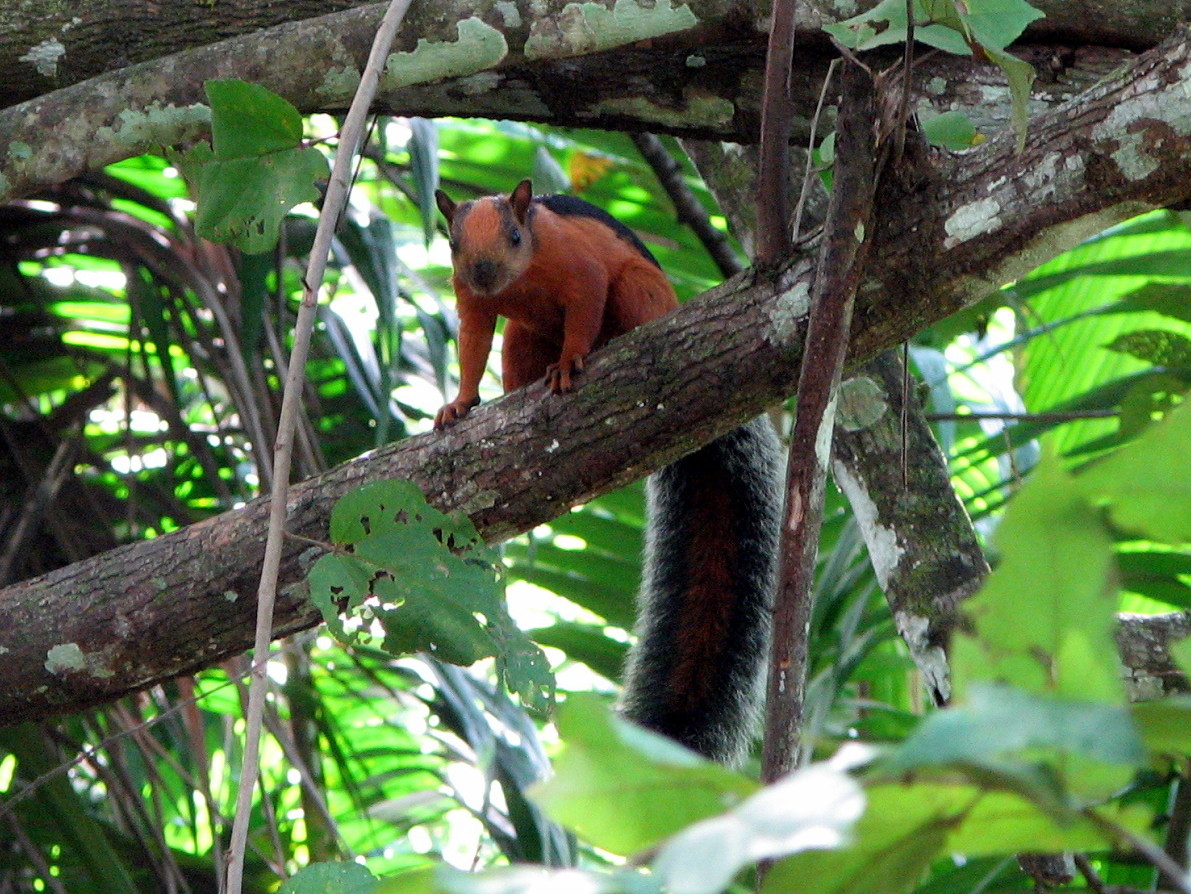
Variegated squirrel

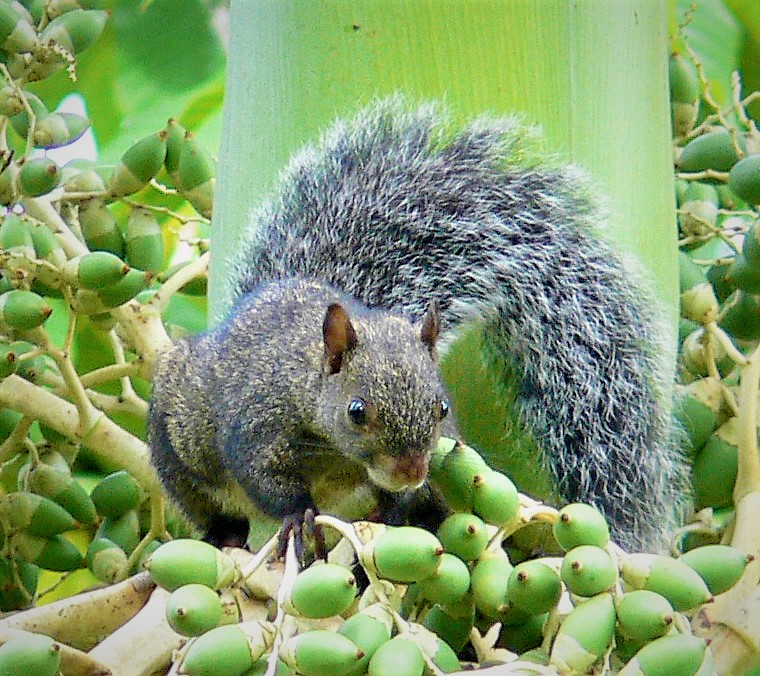
Yucatan squirrel

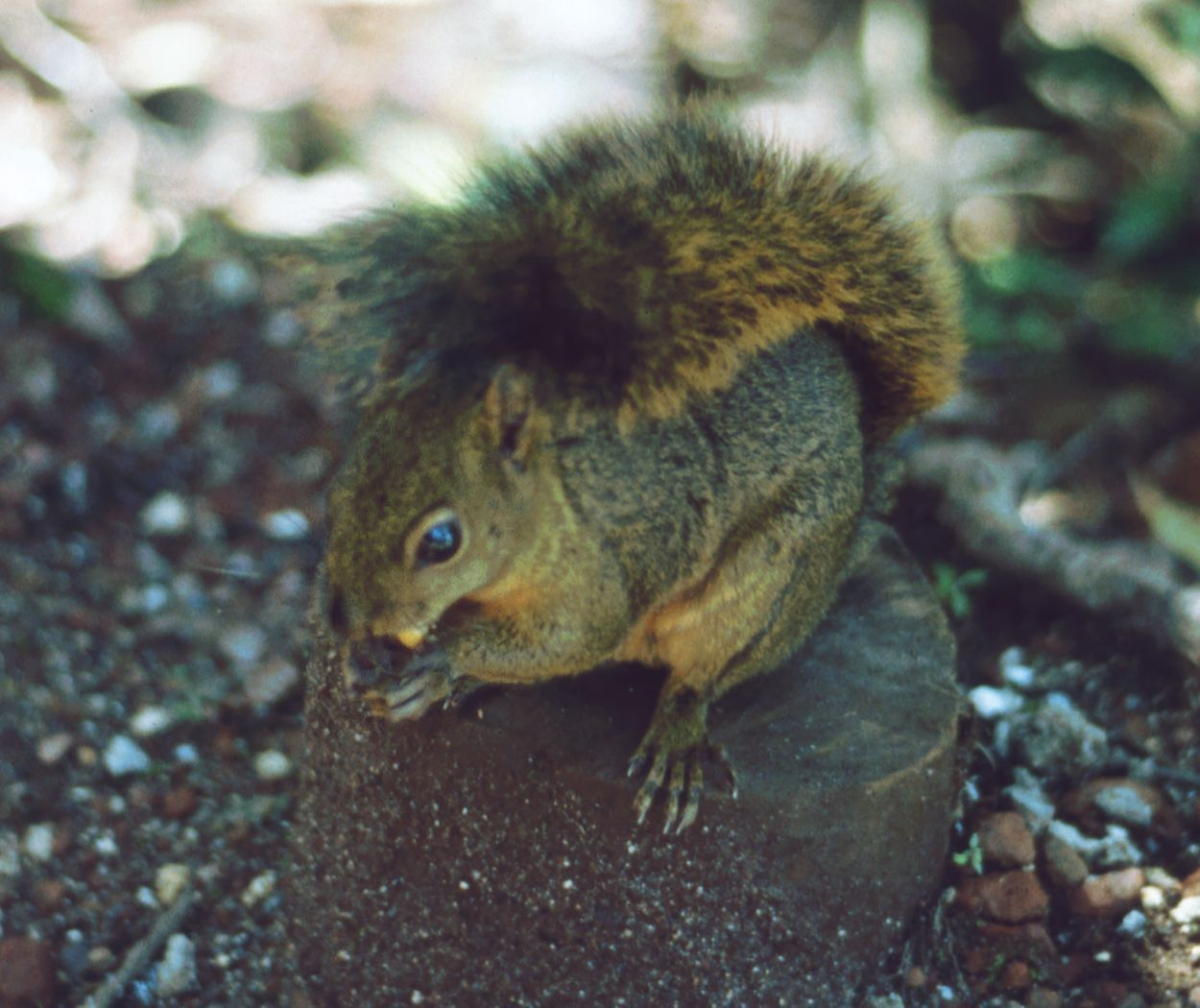
Bangs's mountain squirrel

- Suborder: Sciuromorpha
  - Family: Sciuridae (squirrels)
    - Subfamily: Sciurinae
      - Tribe: Sciurini
        - Genus: Microsciurus
          - Central American dwarf squirrel, Microsciurus alfari LC
          - Western dwarf squirrel, Microsciurus mimulus LC
        - Genus: Sciurus
          - Mexican gray squirrel, Sciurus aureogaster VU
          - Deppe's squirrel, Sciurus deppei LC
          - Red-tailed squirrel, Sciurus granatensis LC
          - Richmond's squirrel, Sciurus richmondi NT
          - Variegated squirrel, Sciurus variegatoides LC
          - Yucatan squirrel, Sciurus yucatanensis LC
        - Genus: Syntheosciurus
          - Bangs's mountain squirrel, Syntheosciurus brochus NT
- Suborder: Castorimorpha
  - Family: Geomyidae
      - Genus: Orthogeomys
        - Chiriqui pocket gopher, Orthogeomys cavator LC
        - Cherrie's pocket gopher, Orthogeomys cherriei LC
        - Oaxacan pocket gopher, Orthogeomys cuniculus DD
        - Darien pocket gopher, Orthogeomys dariensis LC
        - Giant pocket gopher, Orthogeomys grandis LC
        - Variable pocket gopher, Orthogeomys heterodus LC
        - Hispid pocket gopher, Orthogeomys hispidus LC
        - Nicaraguan pocket gopher, Orthogeomys matagalpae LC
        - Underwood's pocket gopher, Orthogeomys underwoodi LC
  - Family: Heteromyidae
    - Subfamily: Heteromyinae
      - Genus: Heteromys
        - Panamanian spiny pocket mouse, Heteromys adspersus LC
        - Southern spiny pocket mouse, Heteromys australis LC
        - Desmarest's spiny pocket mouse, Heteromys desmarestianus LC
        - Gaumer's spiny pocket mouse, Heteromys gaumeri LC
        - Nelson's spiny pocket mouse, Heteromys nelsoni EN
        - Cloud-dwelling spiny pocket mouse, Heteromys nubicolens NE
        - Mountain spiny pocket mouse, Heteromys oresterus LC
        - Painted spiny pocket mouse, Heteromys pictus LC
        - Salvin's spiny pocket mouse, Heteromys salvini LC

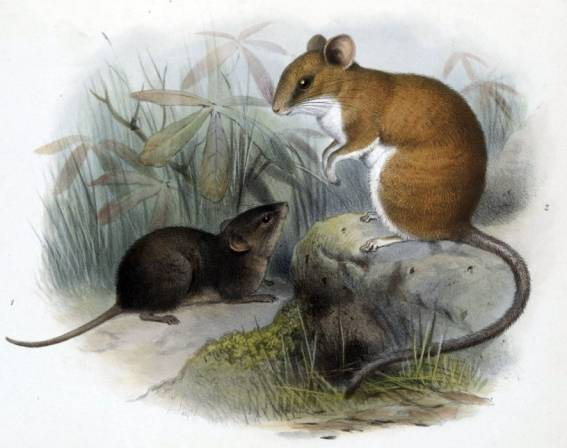
Sumichrast's vesper rat (right) and Alston's brown mouse (left)

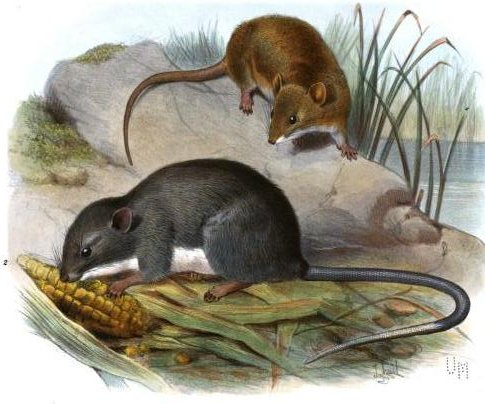
Panamanian climbing rat (below) and Coues' rice rat (above)

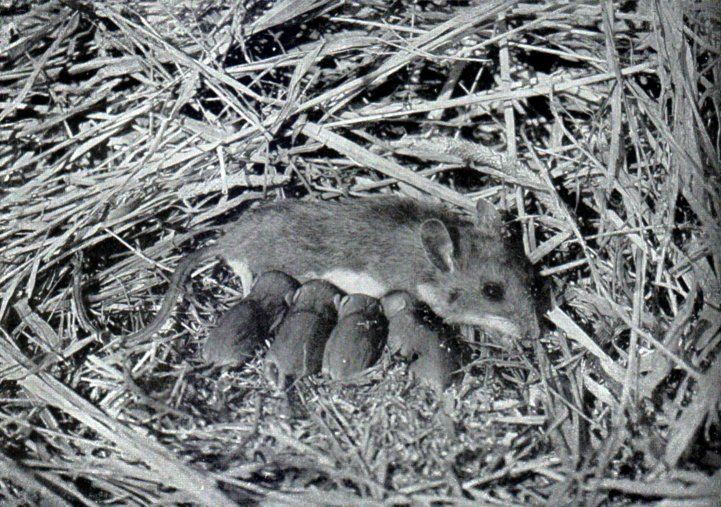
White-footed mouse

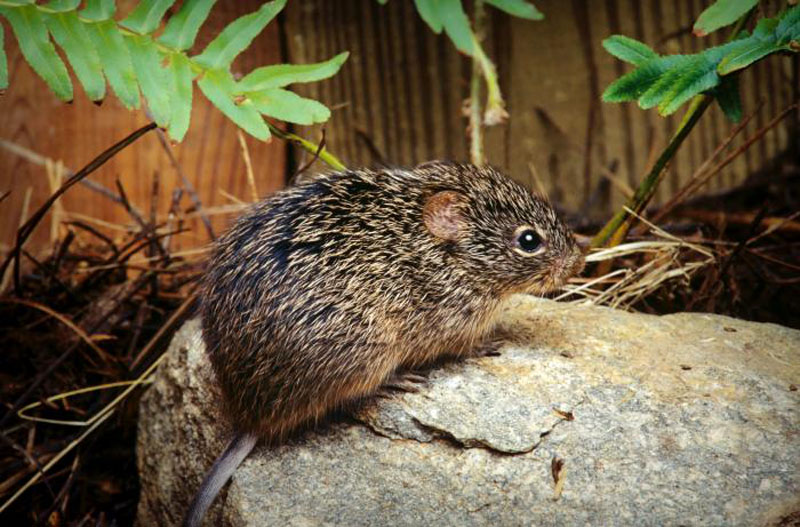
Sigmodon (cotton rat) sp.

- Suborder: Myomorpha
  - Family: Cricetidae
    - Subfamily: Arvicolinae
      - Genus: Microtus
        - Guatemalan vole, Microtus guatemalensis NT
    - Subfamily: Tylomyinae
      - Genus: Nyctomys
        - Sumichrast's vesper rat, Nyctomys sumichrasti LC
      - Genus: Otonyctomys
        - Hatt's vesper rat, Otonyctomys hatti LC
      - Genus: Ototylomys
        - Big-eared climbing rat, Ototylomys phyllotis LC
      - Genus: Tylomys
        - Chiapan climbing rat, Tylomys bullaris CR
        - Fulvous-bellied climbing rat, Tylomys fulviventer DD
        - Peters's climbing rat, Tylomys nudicaudus LC
        - Panamanian climbing rat, Tylomys panamensis DD
        - Tumbala climbing rat, Tylomys tumbalensis CR
        - Watson's climbing rat, Tylomys watsoni LC
    - Subfamily: Neotominae
      - Genus: Baiomys
        - Southern pygmy mouse, Baiomys musculus LC
      - Genus: Habromys
        - Crested-tailed deermouse, Habromys lophurus NT
      - Genus: Isthmomys
        - Yellow isthmus rat, Isthmomys flavidus NT
        - Mount Pirri isthmus rat, Isthmomys pirrensis LC
      - Genus: Neotoma
        - Nicaraguan woodrat, Neotoma chrysomelas LC
        - Mexican woodrat, Neotoma mexicana LC
      - Genus: Peromyscus
        - Aztec mouse, Peromyscus aztecus LC
        - Big deer mouse, Peromyscus grandis NT
        - Guatemalan deer mouse, Peromyscus guatemalensis LC
        - Naked-eared deer mouse, Peromyscus gymnotis LC
        - White-footed mouse, Peromyscus leucopus LC
        - Nimble-footed mouse, Peromyscus levipes LC
        - Plateau mouse, Peromyscus melanophrys LC
        - Maya mouse, Peromyscus mayensis CR
        - Mexican deer mouse, Peromyscus mexicanus LC
        - Stirton's deer mouse, Peromyscus stirtoni LR
        - Yucatan deer mouse, Peromyscus yucatanicus LC
        - Chiapan deer mouse, Peromyscus zarhynchus VU
      - Genus: Reithrodontomys
        - Short-nosed harvest mouse, Reithrodontomys brevirostris LC
        - Chiriqui harvest mouse, Reithrodontomys creper LC
        - Darien harvest mouse, Reithrodontomys darienensis LC
        - Fulvous harvest mouse, Reithrodontomys fulvescens LC
        - Slender harvest mouse, Reithrodontomys gracilis LC
        - Mexican harvest mouse, Reithrodontomys mexicanus LC
        - Small-toothed harvest mouse, Reithrodontomys microdon VU
        - Nicaraguan harvest mouse, Reithrodontomys paradoxus DD
        - Rodriguez's harvest mouse, Reithrodontomys rodriguezi LC
        - Cozumel harvest mouse, Reithrodontomys spectabilis CR
        - Sumichrast's harvest mouse, Reithrodontomys sumichrasti LC
        - Narrow-nosed harvest mouse, Reithrodontomys tenuirostris VU
      - Genus: Scotinomys
        - Alston's brown mouse, Scotinomys teguina LC
        - Chiriqui brown mouse, Scotinomys xerampelinus LC
    - Subfamily: Sigmodontinae
      - Genus: Handleyomys
        - Alfaro's rice rat, Handleyomys alfaroi LC
        - Chapman's rice rat, Handleyomys chapmani LC
        - Black-eared rice rat, Handleyomys melanotis LC
        - Striped rice rat, Handleyomys rhabdops VU
        - Long-nosed rice rat, Handleyomys rostratus LC
        - Cloud forest rice rat, Handleyomys saturatior NT
      - Genus: Ichthyomys
        - Tweedy's crab-eating rat, Ichthyomys tweedii DD
      - Genus: Melanomys
        - Dusky rice rat, Melanomys caliginosus LC
      - Genus: Neacomys
        - Painted bristly mouse, Neacomys pictus DD
      - Genus: Nephelomys
        - Tomes's rice rat, Nephelomys albigularis LC
        - Boquete rice rat, Nephelomys devius LC
      - Genus: Oecomys
        - Bicolored arboreal rice rat, Oecomys bicolor LC
        - Trinidad arboreal rice rat, Oecomys trinitatis LC
      - Genus: Oligoryzomys
        - Fulvous pygmy rice rat, Oligoryzomys fulvescens LC
        - Sprightly pygmy rice rat, Oligoryzomys vegetus LC
      - Genus: Oryzomys
        - Coues' rice rat, Oryzomys couesi LC
        - Nicaraguan rice rat, Oryzomys dimidiatus LC
      - Genus: Rheomys
        - Goldman's water mouse, Rheomys raptor LC
        - Thomas's water mouse, Rheomys thomasi NT
        - Underwood's water mouse, Rheomys underwoodi LC
      - Genus: Rhipidomys
        - Splendid climbing mouse, Rhipidomys nitela LC
        - Broad-footed climbing mouse, Rhipidomys latimanus LC
      - Genus: Sigmodon
        - Southern cotton rat, Sigmodon hirsutus LC
        - Jaliscan cotton rat, Sigmodon mascotensis LC
        - Toltec cotton rat, Sigmodon toltecus LC
      - Genus: Sigmodontomys
        - Alfaro's rice water rat, Sigmodontomys alfari LC
        - Harris's rice water rat, Sigmodontomys aphrastus DD
      - Genus: Transandinomys
        - Bolivar rice rat, Transandinomys bolivaris LC
        - Talamancan rice rat, Transandinomys talamancae LC
      - Genus: Zygodontomys
        - Short-tailed cane mouse, Zygodontomys brevicauda LC

===== Order: Lagomorpha (lagomorphs) =====
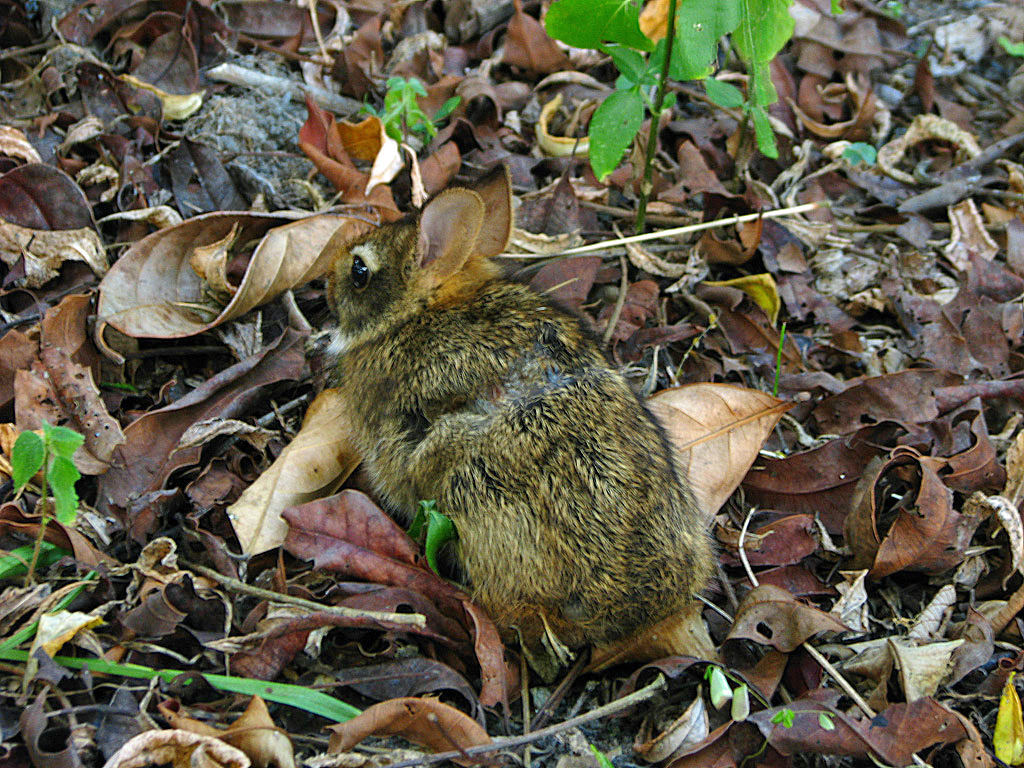
Tapeti

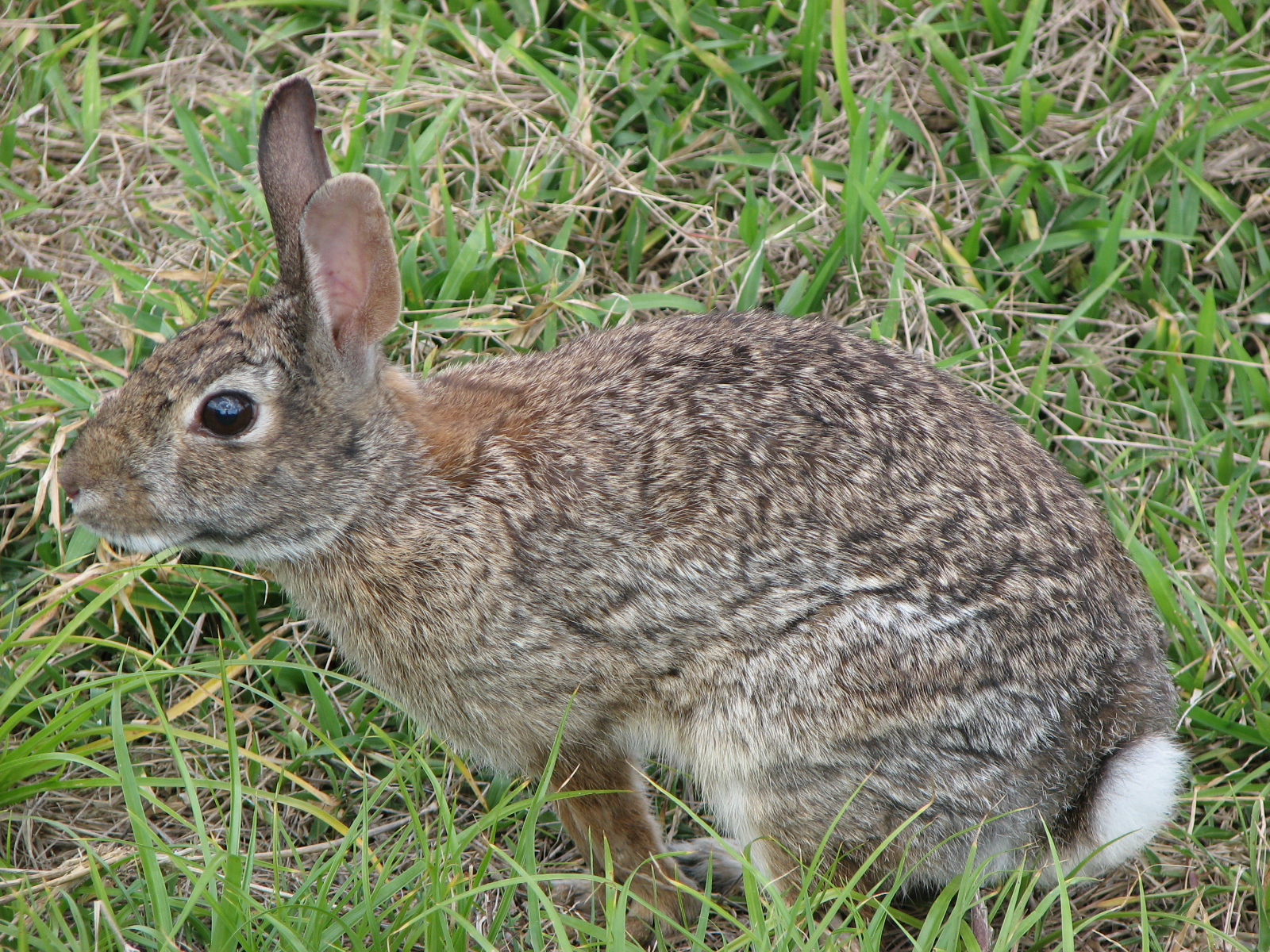
Eastern cottontail

The lagomorphs comprise two families, Leporidae (hares and rabbits), and Ochotonidae (pikas). Though they can resemble rodents, and were classified as a superfamily in that order until the early 20th century, they have since been considered a separate order. They differ from rodents in a number of physical characteristics, such as having four incisors in the upper jaw rather than two. Central America's lagomorph diversity is considerably less than that of Mexico as a whole, but is greater than that of South America.

- Family: Leporidae (rabbits, hares)
    - Genus: Sylvilagus
      - Dice's cottontail, Sylvilagus dicei VU
      - Eastern cottontail, Sylvilagus floridanus LC
      - Central American tapetí, Sylvilagus gabbi LC
      - Northern tapetí, Sylvilagus incitatus NE
    - Genus: Lepus
      - Tehuantepec jackrabbit, Lepus flavigularis EN

==== Superorder Laurasiatheria ====
===== Order: Eulipotyphla (shrews, hedgehogs, moles, and solenodons) =====
Eulipotyphlans are insectivorous mammals. Shrews and solenodons closely resemble mice, hedgehogs carry spines, while moles are stout-bodied burrowers. Central America's shrew diversity is comparable to that of Mexico as a whole, and is considerably greater than that of South America. Moles are not found in the Americas south of northern Mexico.

- Family: Soricidae (shrews)
  - Subfamily: Soricinae
    - Genus: Cryptotis
      - C. mexicana group
        - Mexican small-eared shrew, Cryptotis mexicana LC
        - goldmani set
          - Goldman's broad-clawed shrew, Cryptotis goldmani LC
          - Goodwin's broad-clawed shrew, Cryptotis goodwini LC
          - Guatemalan broad-clawed shrew, Cryptotis griseoventris VU
          - Cryptotis lacertosus NE
          - Cryptotis mam NE
      - C. nigrescens group
        - Honduran small-eared shrew, Cryptotis hondurensis DD
        - Yucatan small-eared shrew, Cryptotis mayensis LC
        - Darién small-eared shrew, Cryptotis mera EN
        - Merriam's small-eared shrew, Cryptotis merriami LC
        - Blackish small-eared shrew, Cryptotis nigrescens LC
      - C. parva group
        - Central American least shrew, Cryptotis orophila DD
        - North American least shrew, Cryptotis parva LC
        - Tropical small-eared shrew, Cryptotis tropicalis DD
      - ungrouped/relict
        - Enders's small-eared shrew, Cryptotis endersi EN
        - Talamancan small-eared shrew, Cryptotis gracilis VU
    - Genus: Sorex
      - Subgenus: Otisorex
        - Verapaz shrew, Sorex veraepacis LC
      - Subgenus: incertae sedis
        - Saussure's shrew, Sorex saussurei LC
        - Sclater's shrew, Sorex sclateri CR
        - San Cristobal shrew, Sorex stizodon CR
        - Veracruz shrew, Sorex veraecrucis LC

===== Order: Chiroptera (bats) =====
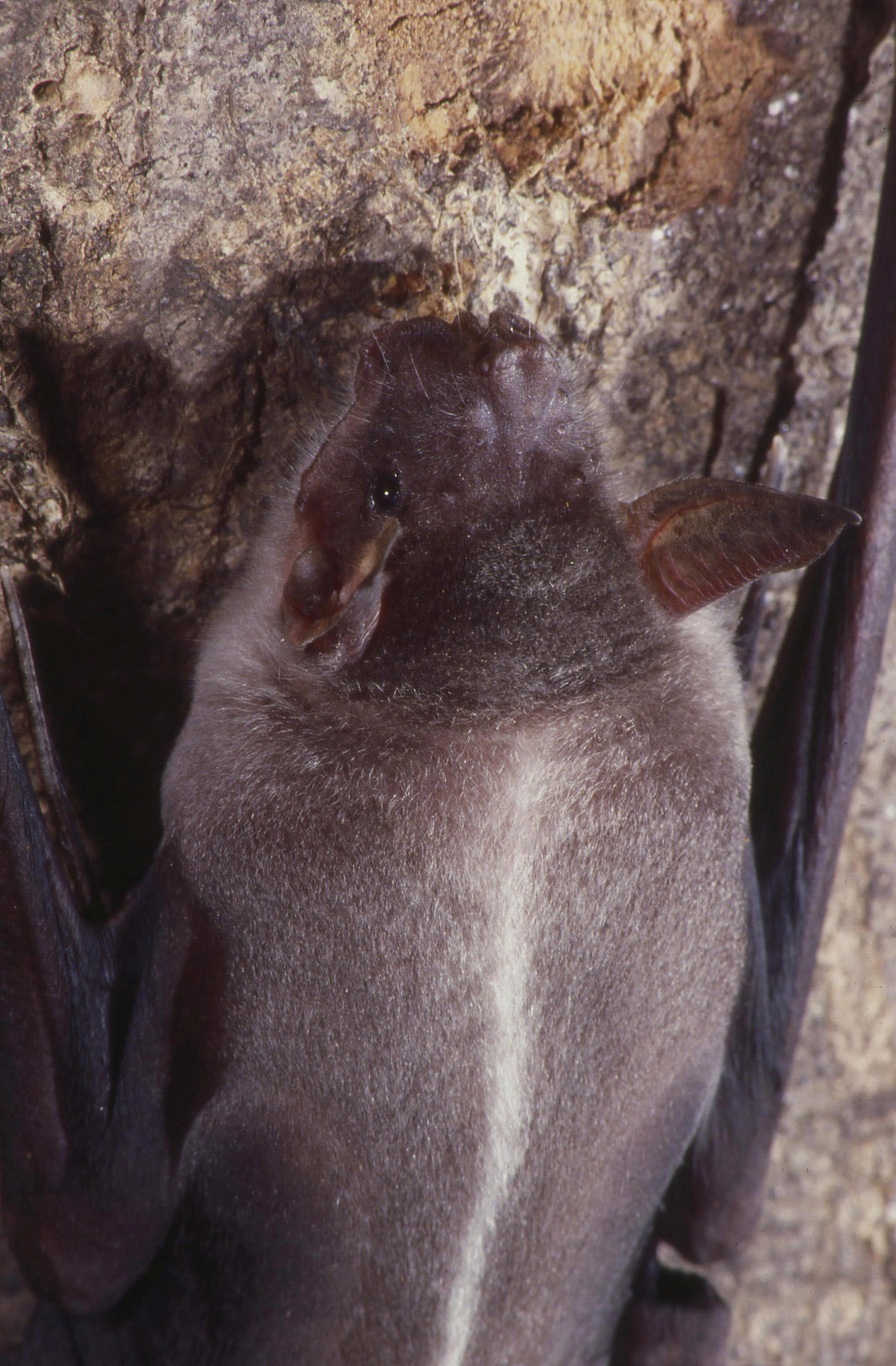
Greater bulldog bat

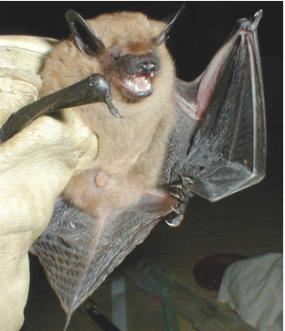
Big brown bat

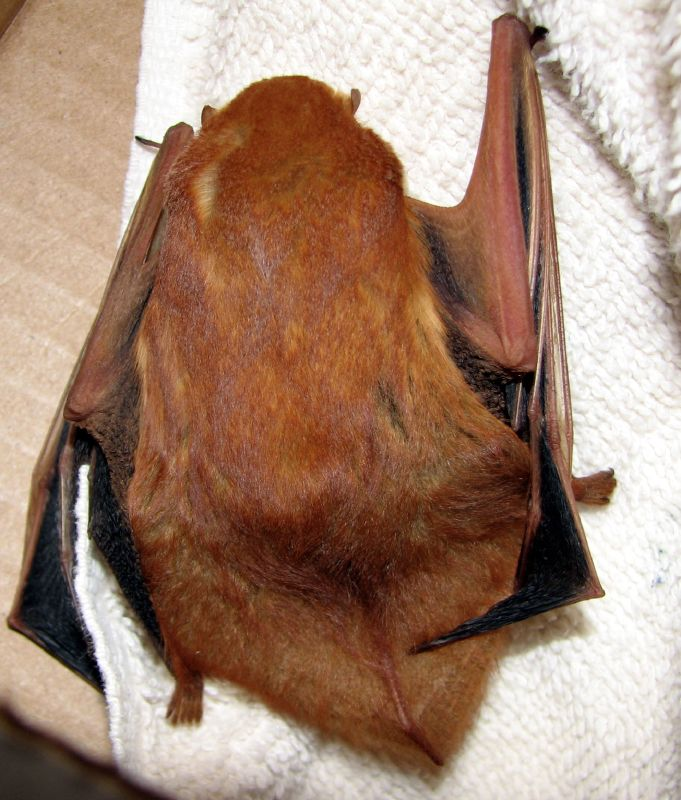
Desert red bat

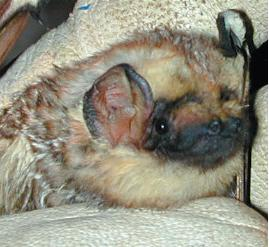
Hoary bat

The bats' most distinguishing feature is that their forelimbs are developed as wings, making them the only mammals capable of flight. Bat species account for about 20% of all mammals.

- Family: Noctilionidae
    - Genus: Noctilio
      - Lesser bulldog bat, Noctilio albiventris LC
      - Greater bulldog bat, Noctilio leporinus LC
- Family: Vespertilionidae
  - Subfamily: Myotinae
    - Genus: Myotis
      - Silver-tipped myotis, Myotis albescens LC
      - Southwestern myotis, Myotis auriculus LC
      - California myotis, Myotis californicus LC
      - Guatemalan myotis, Myotis cobanensis DD
      - Elegant myotis, Myotis elegans LC
      - Cinnamon myotis, Myotis fortidens LC
      - Hairy-legged myotis, Myotis keaysi LC
      - Black myotis, Myotis nigricans LC
      - Montane myotis, Myotis oxyotus LC
      - Riparian myotis, Myotis riparius LC
      - Fringed myotis, Myotis thysanodes LC
      - Cave myotis, Myotis velifer LC
  - Subfamily: Vespertilioninae
    - Genus: Bauerus
      - Van Gelder's bat, Bauerus dubiaquercus NT
    - Genus: Eptesicus
      - Little black serotine, Eptesicus andinus LC
      - Brazilian brown bat, Eptesicus brasiliensis LC
      - Chiriquinan serotine, Eptesicus chiriquinus LC
      - Argentine brown bat, Eptesicus furinalis LC
      - Big brown bat, Eptesicus fuscus LC
    - Genus: Lasiurus
      - Desert red bat, Lasiurus blossevillii LC
      - Tacarcuna bat, Lasiurus castaneus DD
      - Hoary bat, Lasiurus cinereus LC
      - Southern yellow bat, Lasiurus ega LC
      - Big red bat, Lasiurus egregius DD
      - Northern yellow bat, Lasiurus intermedius LC
    - Genus: Pipistrellus
      - Eastern pipistrelle, Pipistrellus subflavus LC
    - Genus: Plecotus
      - Mexican big-eared bat, Plecotus mexicanus NT
    - Genus: Rhogeessa
      - Yucatan yellow bat, Rhogeessa aeneus LC
      - Genoways's yellow bat, Rhogeessa genowaysi EN
      - Slender yellow bat, Rhogeessa gracilis LC
      - Thomas's yellow bat, Rhogeessa io LC
      - Little yellow bat, Rhogeessa parvula LC
      - Black-winged little yellow bat, Rhogeessa tumida LC

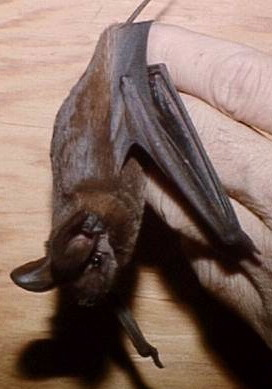
Big free-tailed bat

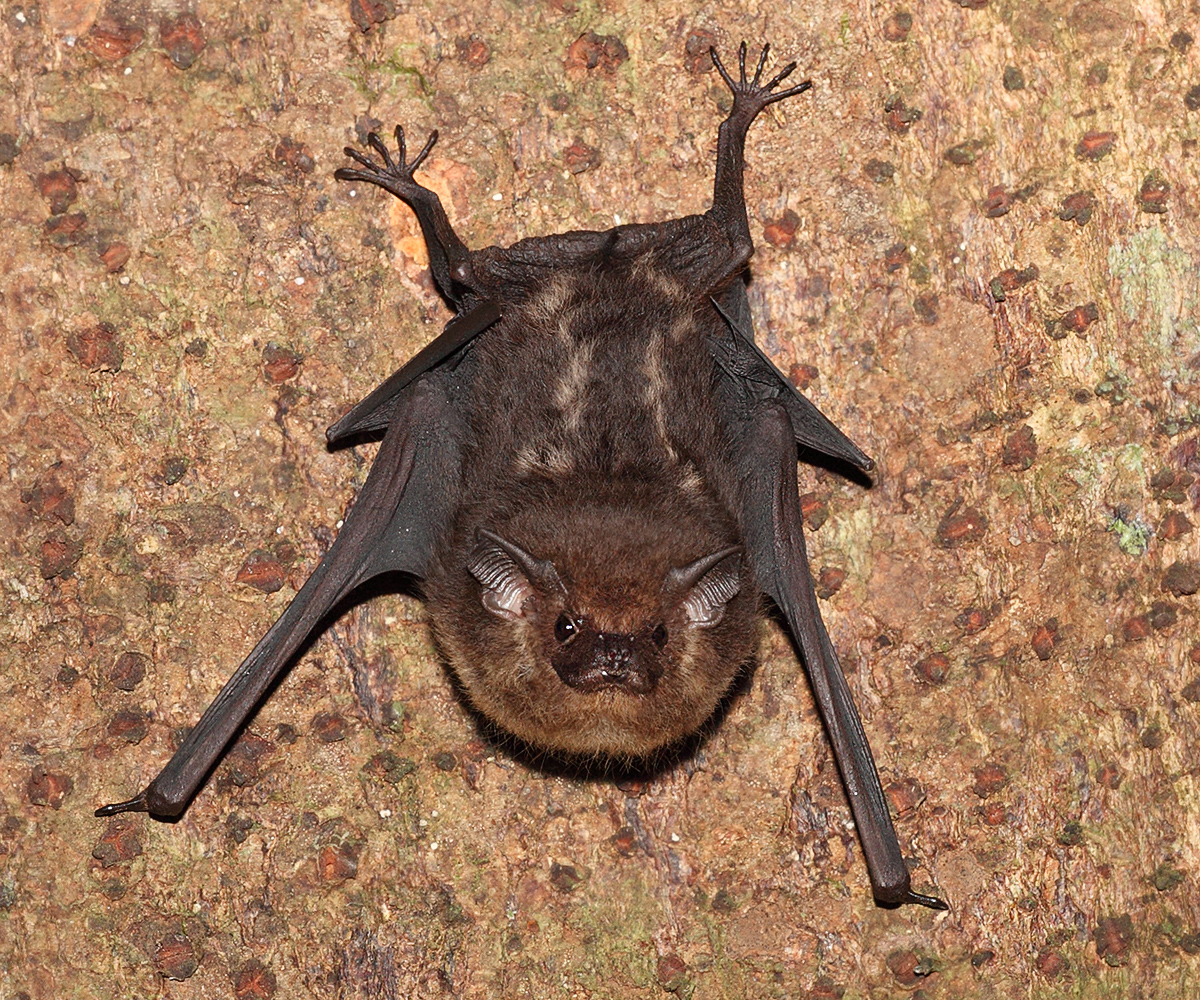
Greater or lesser sac-winged bat

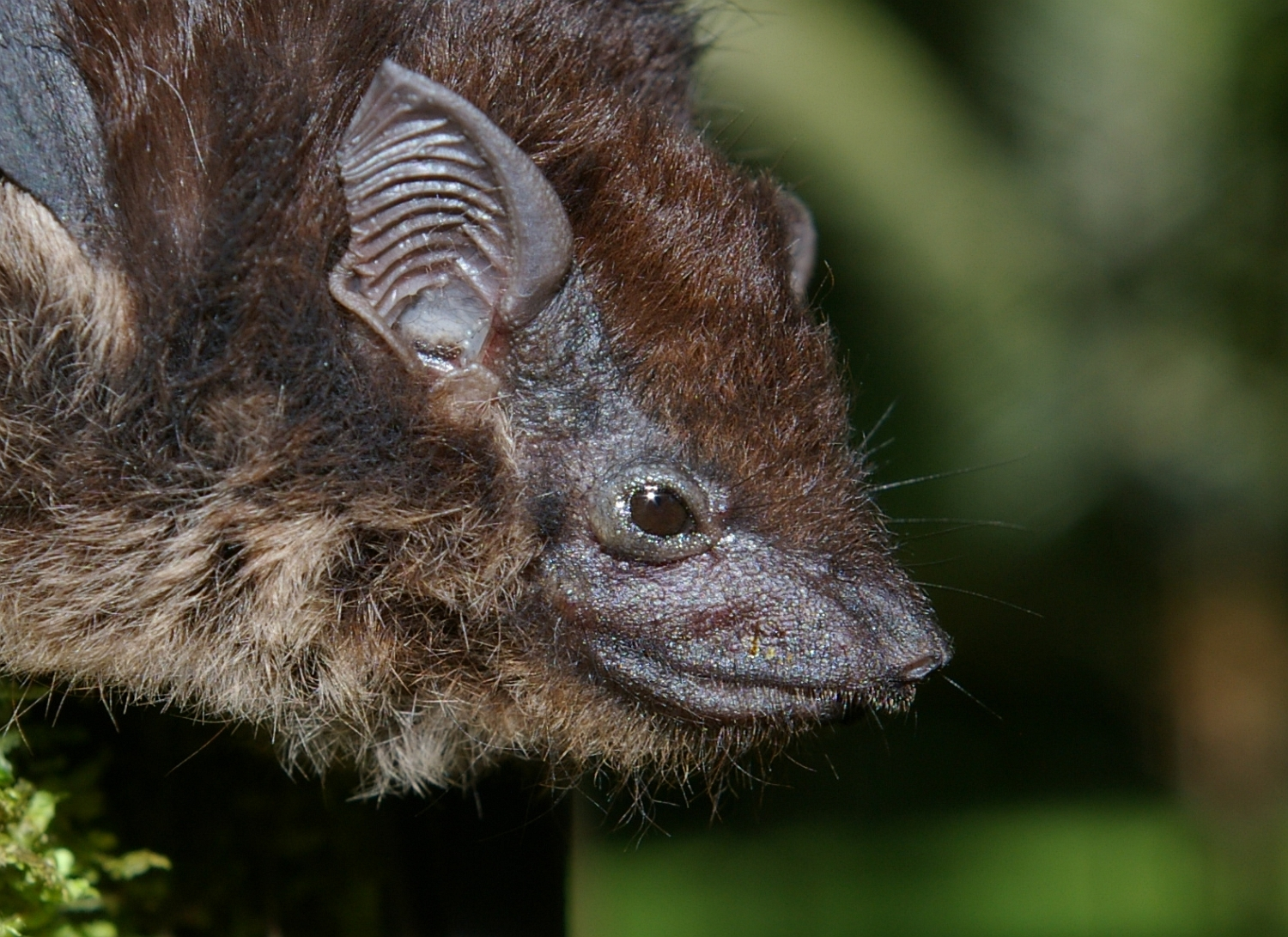
Greater sac-winged bat

- Family: Molossidae
    - Genus: Cynomops
      - Mexican dog-faced bat, Cynomops mexicanus LC
      - Southern dog-faced bat, Cynomops planirostris LC
    - Genus: Eumops
      - Black bonneted bat, Eumops auripendulus LC
      - Dwarf bonneted bat, Eumops bonariensis LC
      - Wagner's bonneted bat, Eumops glaucinus LC
      - Sanborn's bonneted bat, Eumops hansae LC
      - Underwood's bonneted bat, Eumops underwoodi LC
    - Genus: Molossus
      - Aztec mastiff bat, Molossus aztecus LC
      - Bonda mastiff bat, Molossus currentium LC
      - Coiban mastiff bat, Molossus coibensis LC
      - Velvety free-tailed bat, Molossus molossus LC
      - Miller's mastiff bat, Molossus pretiosus LC
      - Black mastiff bat, Molossus rufus LC
      - Sinaloan mastiff bat, Molossus sinaloae LC
    - Genus: Nyctinomops
      - Peale's free-tailed bat, Nyctinomops aurispinosus LC
      - Broad-eared bat, Nyctinomops laticaudatus LC
      - Big free-tailed bat, Nyctinomops macrotis LC
    - Genus: Promops
      - Big crested mastiff bat, Promops centralis LC
    - Genus: Tadarida
      - Mexican free-tailed bat, Tadarida brasiliensis LC
- Family: Emballonuridae
    - Genus: Balantiopteryx
      - Thomas's sac-winged bat, Balantiopteryx io VU
      - Gray sac-winged bat, Balantiopteryx plicata LC
    - Genus: Cormura
      - Chestnut sac-winged bat, Cormura brevirostris LC
    - Genus: Cyttarops
      - Short-eared bat, Cyttarops alecto LC
    - Genus: Diclidurus
      - Northern ghost bat, Diclidurus albus LC
    - Genus: Peropteryx
      - Greater dog-like bat, Peropteryx kappleri LC
      - Lesser doglike bat, Peropteryx macrotis LC
    - Genus: Rhynchonycteris
      - Proboscis bat, Rhynchonycteris naso LC
    - Genus: Saccopteryx
      - Greater sac-winged bat, Saccopteryx bilineata LC
      - Lesser sac-winged bat, Saccopteryx leptura LC

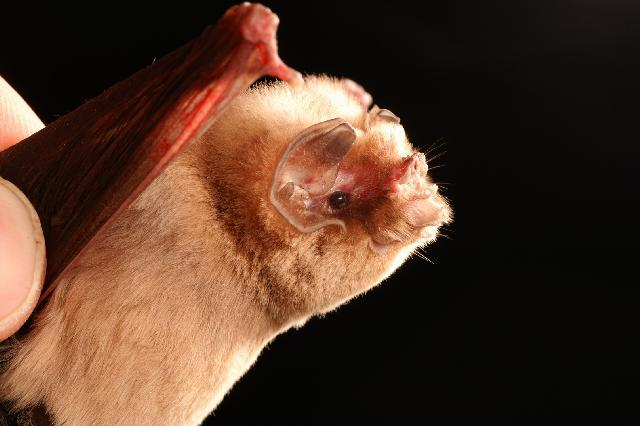
Ghost-faced bat

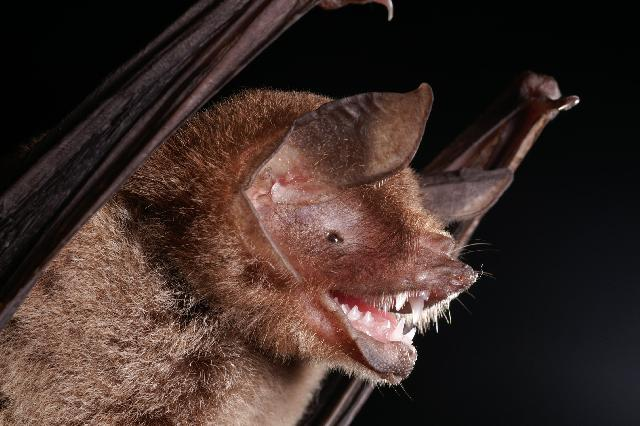
Parnell's mustached bat

- Family: Mormoopidae
    - Genus: Mormoops
      - Ghost-faced bat, Mormoops megalophylla LC
    - Genus: Pteronotus
      - Davy's naked-backed bat, Pteronotus davyi LC
      - Big naked-backed bat, Pteronotus gymnonotus LC
      - Parnell's mustached bat, Pteronotus parnellii LC
      - Wagner's mustached bat, Pteronotus personatus LC

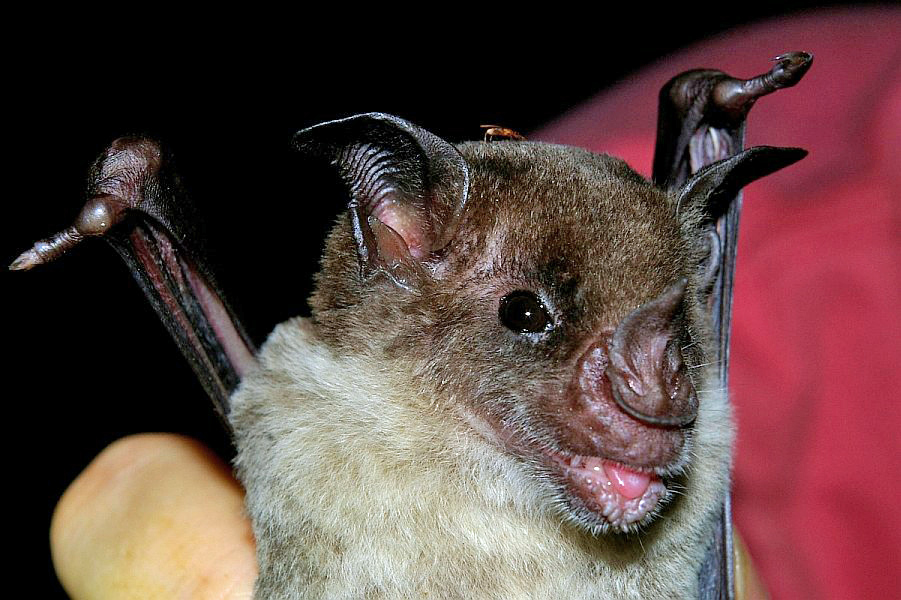
Pale spear-nosed bat

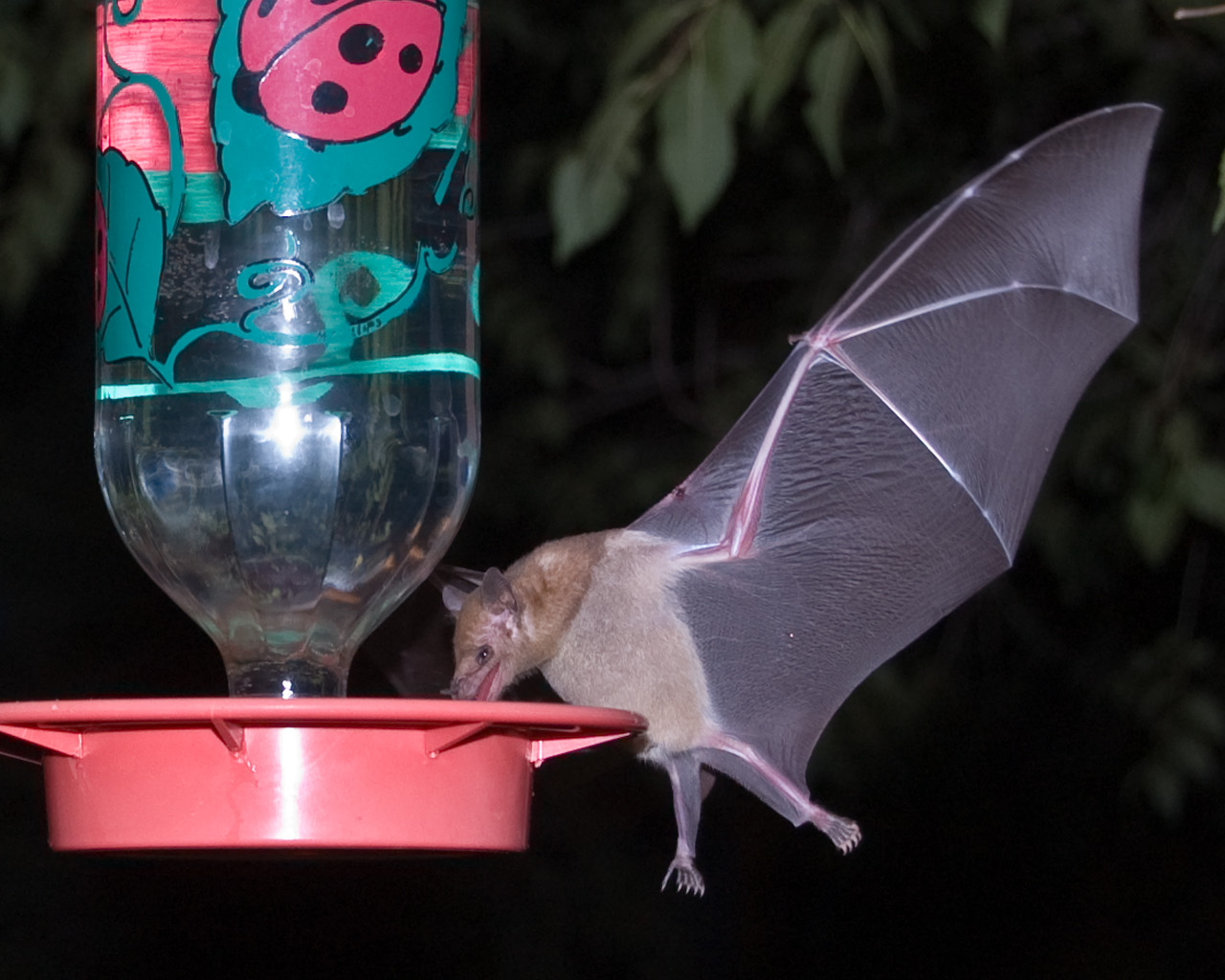
Mexican long-tongued bat

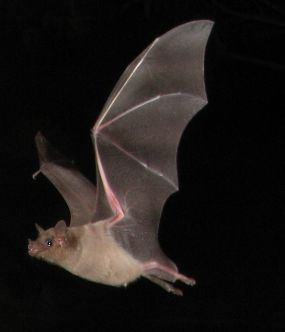
Southern long-nosed bat

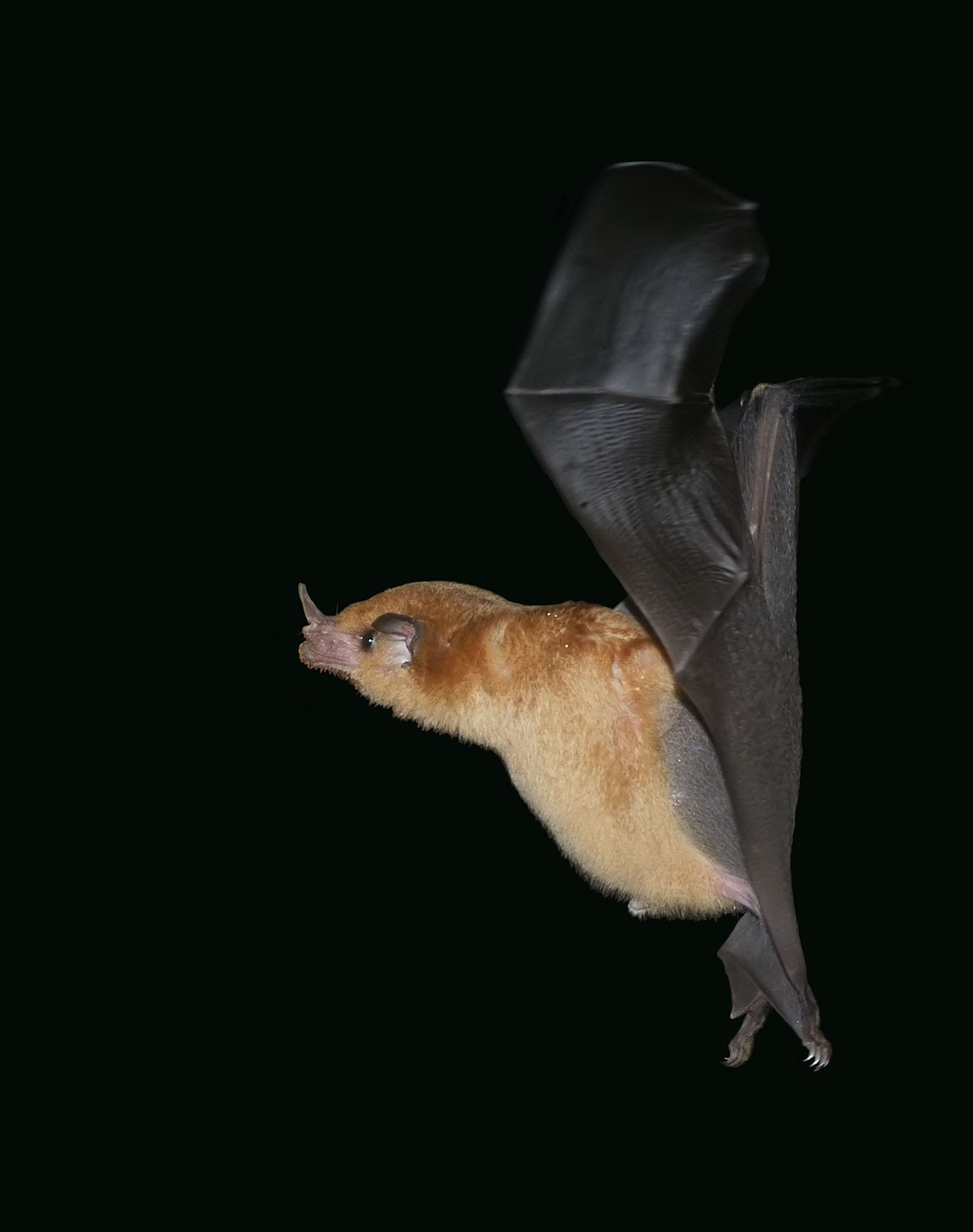
Orange nectar bat

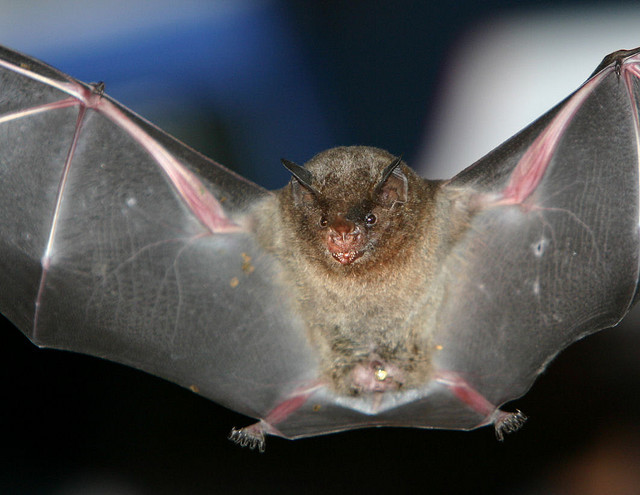
Silky short-tailed bat

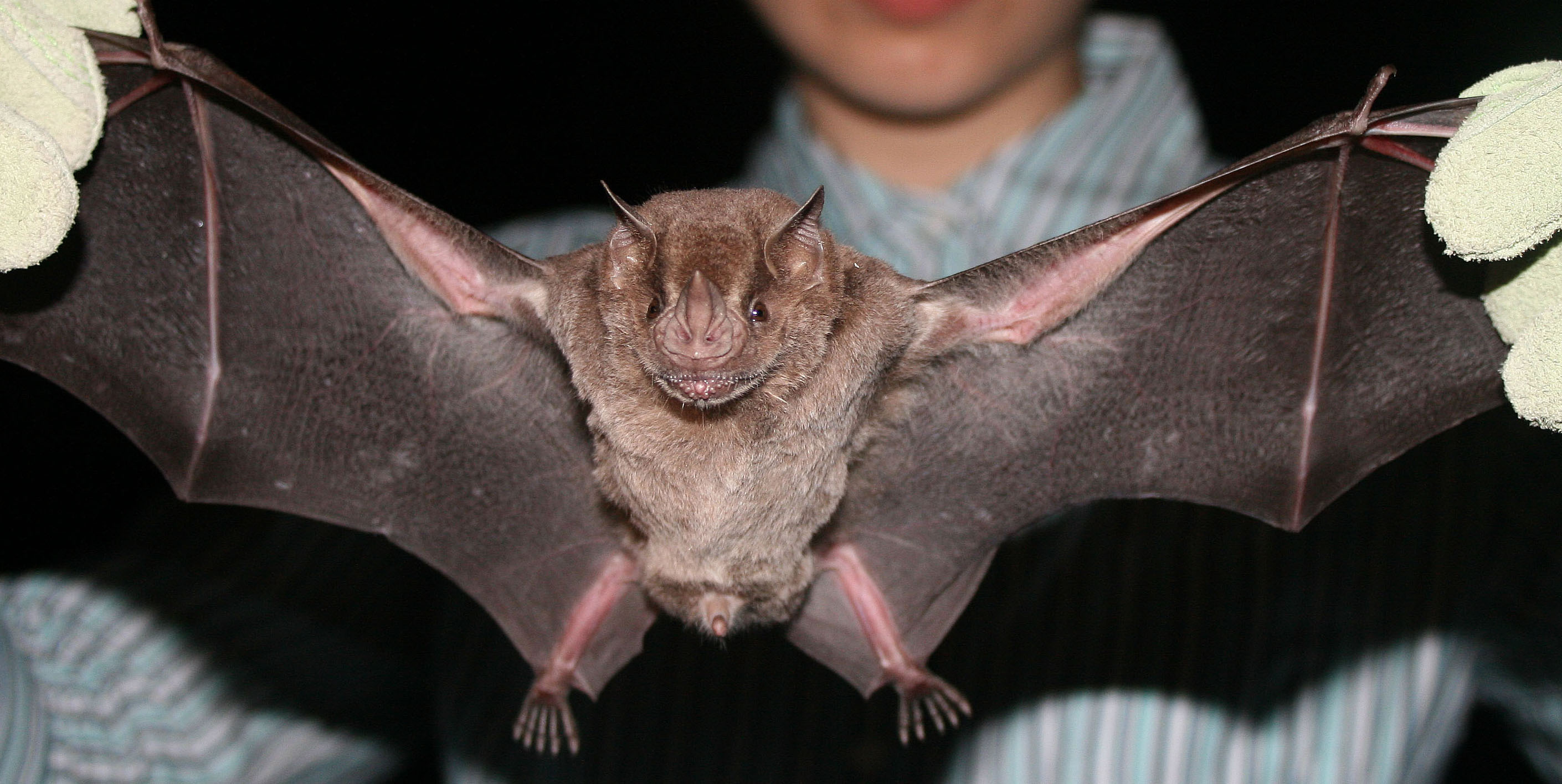
Jamaican fruit bat

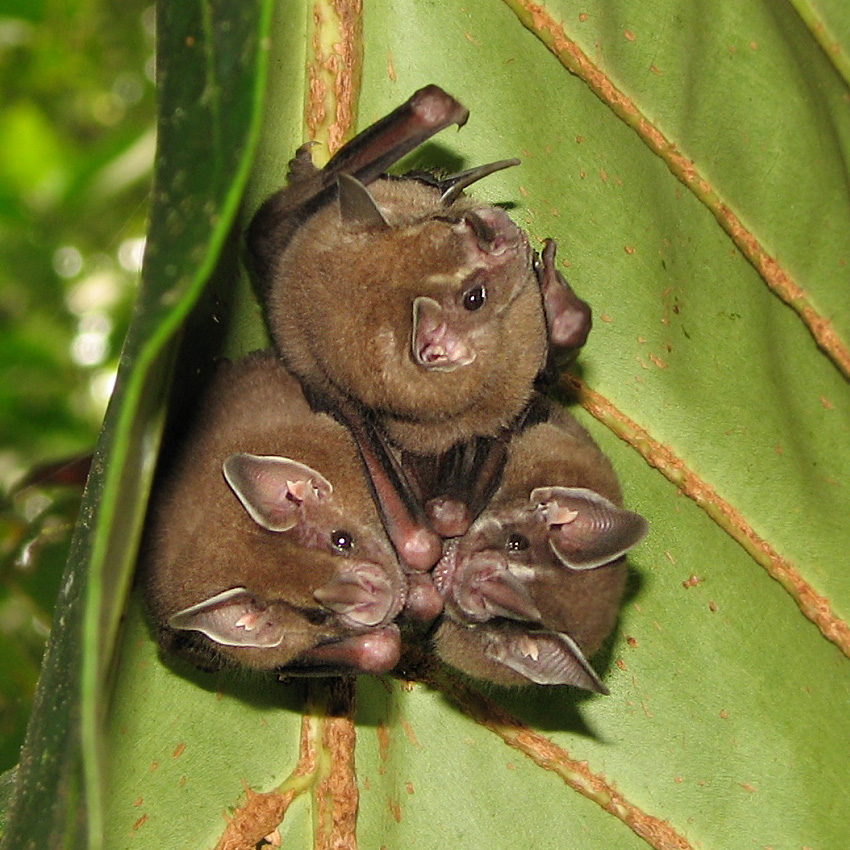
Artibeus sp.

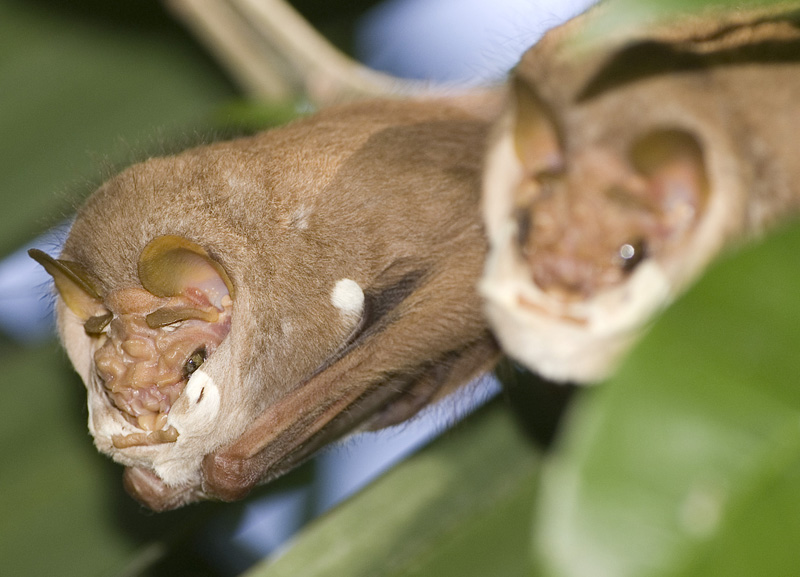
Wrinkle-faced bat

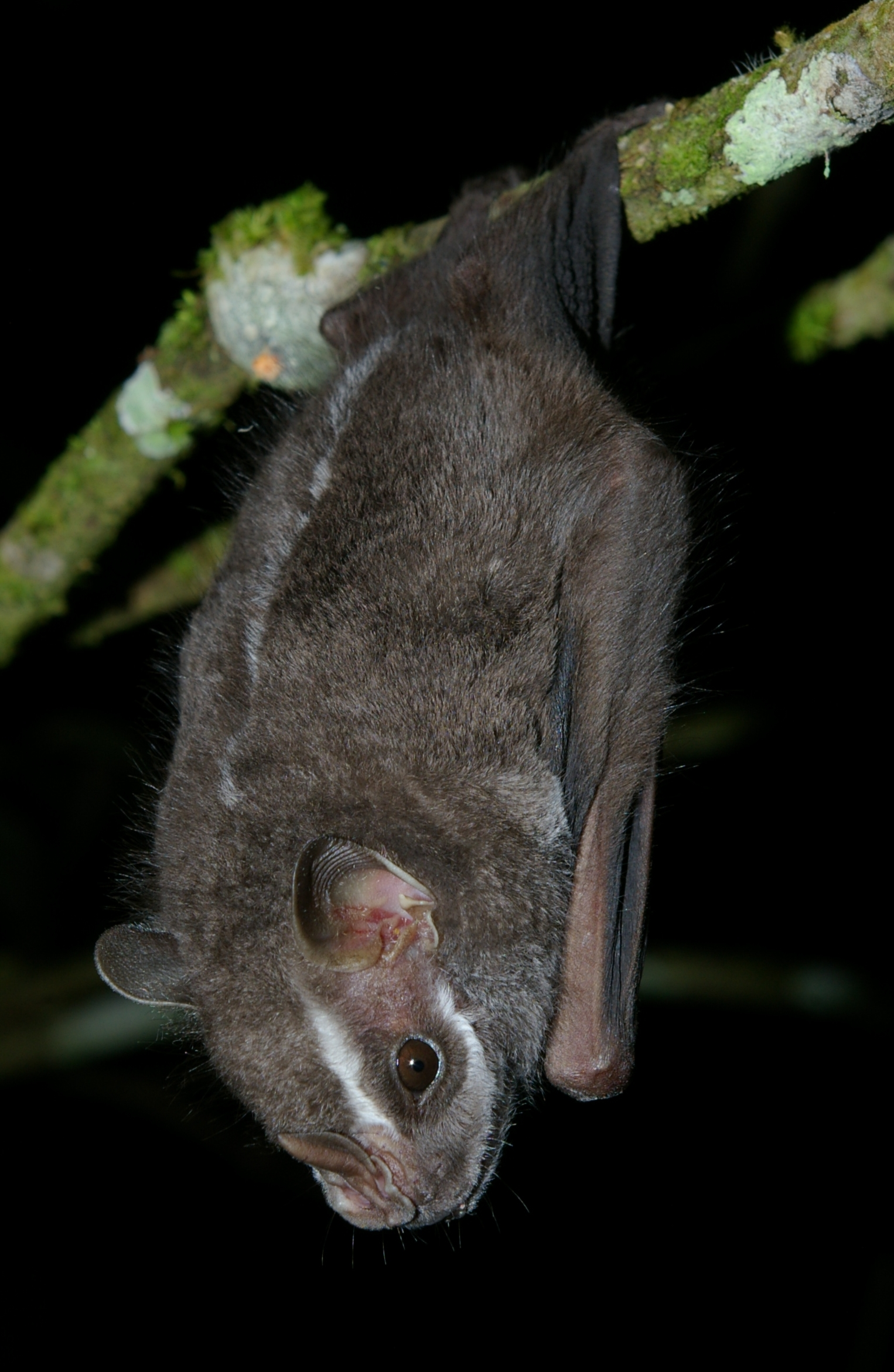
Salvin's big-eyed bat

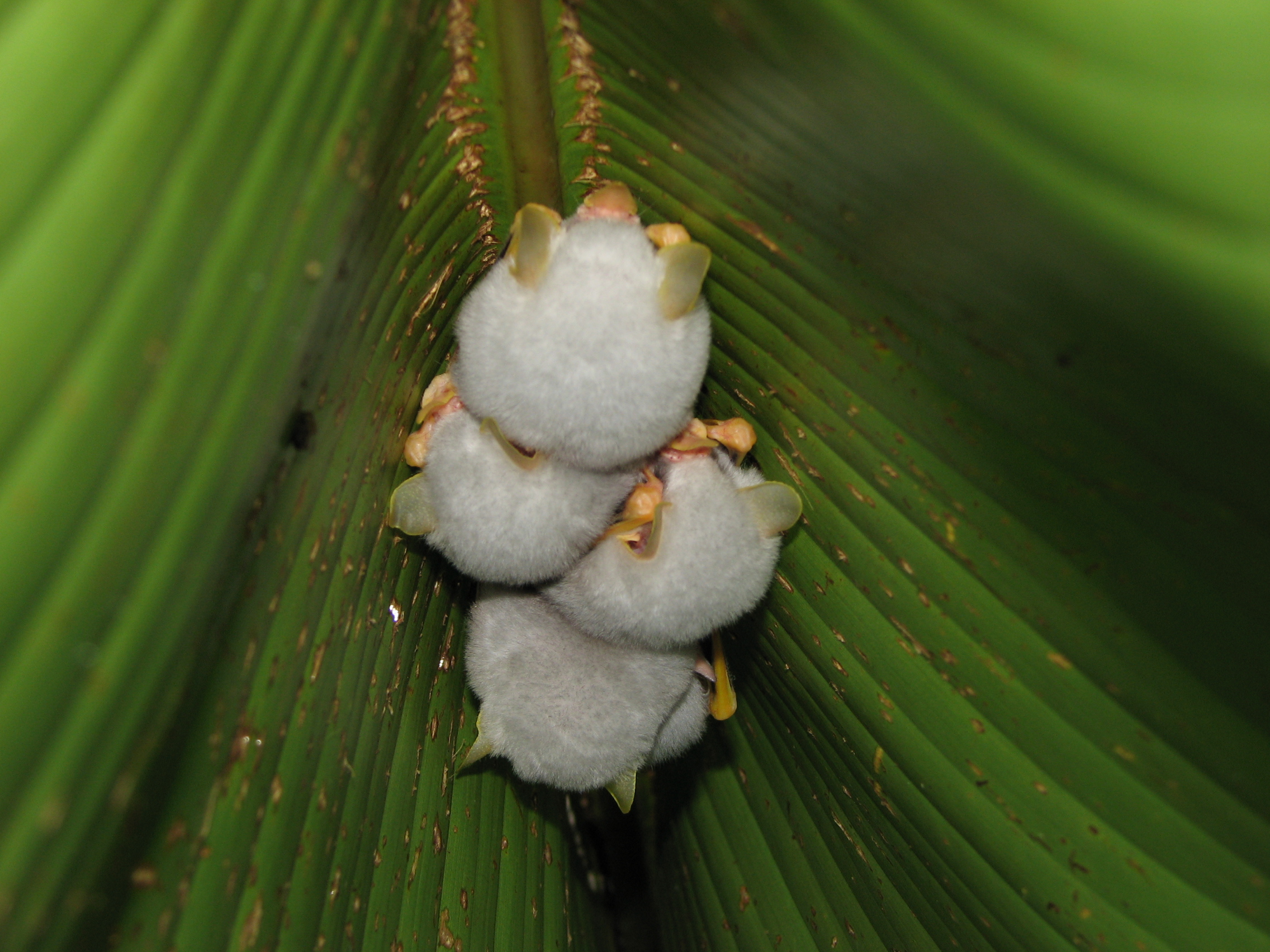
Honduran white bat

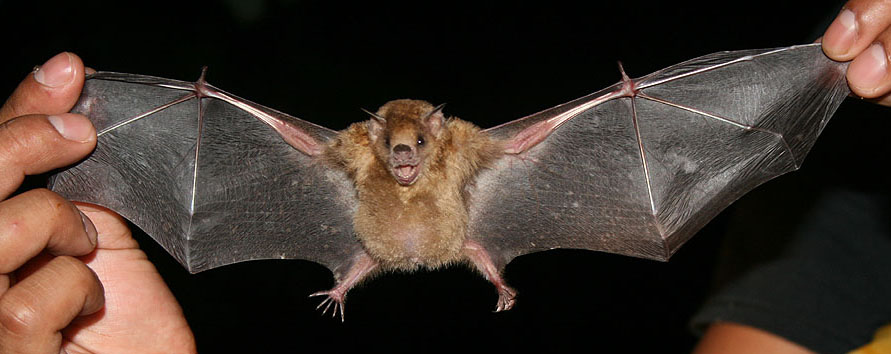
Little yellow-shouldered bat

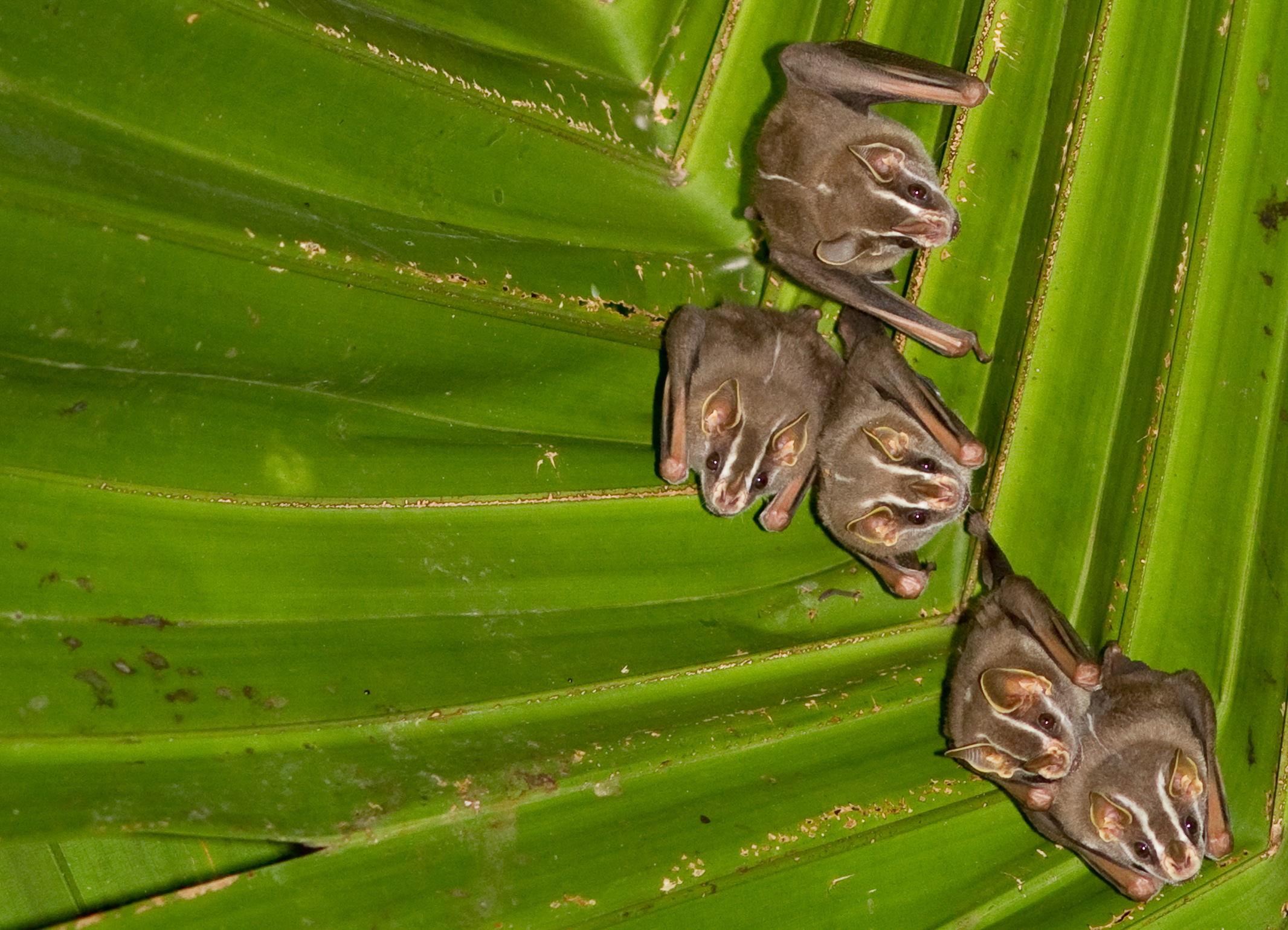
Tent-making bat

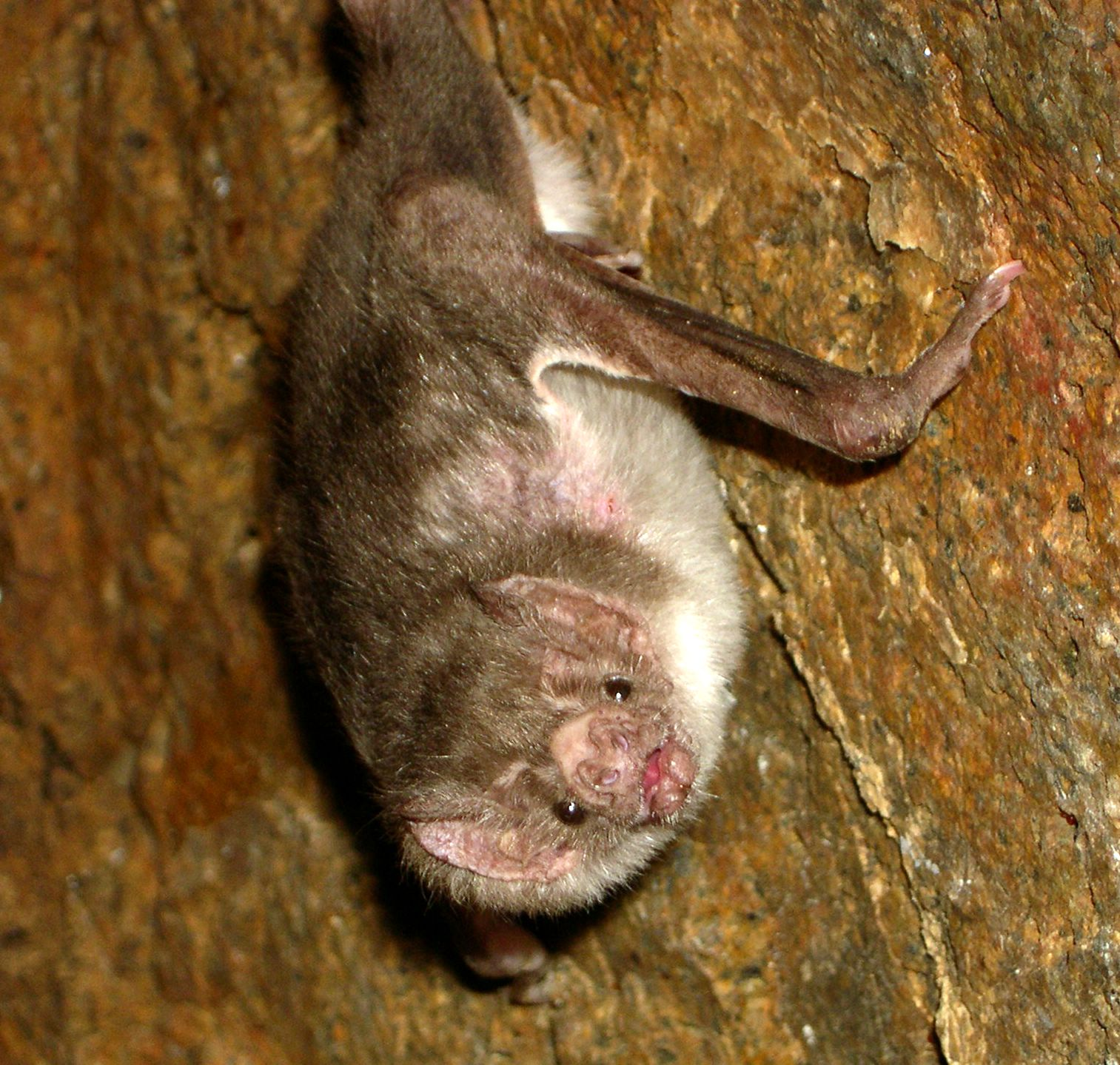
Common vampire bat

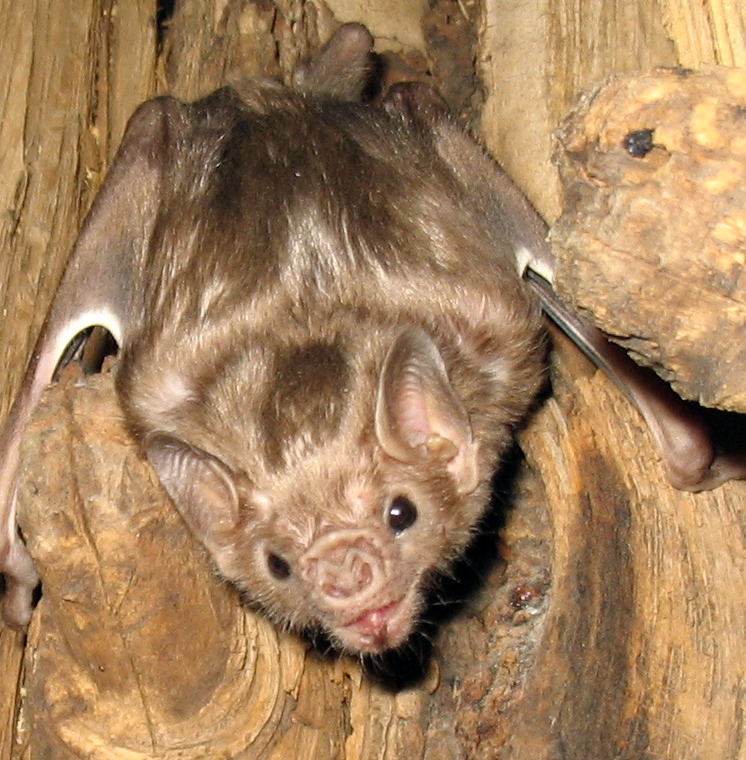
White-winged vampire bat

- Family: Phyllostomidae
  - Subfamily: Phyllostominae
    - Genus: Chrotopterus
      - Big-eared woolly bat, Chrotopterus auritus LC
    - Genus: Glyphonycteris
      - Davies's big-eared bat, Glyphonycteris daviesi LC
      - Tricolored big-eared bat, Glyphonycteris sylvestris LC
    - Genus: Lampronycteris
      - Yellow-throated big-eared bat, Lampronycteris brachyotis LC
    - Genus: Lonchorhina
      - Tomes's sword-nosed bat, Lonchorhina aurita LC
    - Genus: Lophostoma
      - Pygmy round-eared bat, Lophostoma brasiliense LC
      - Davis's round-eared bat, Lophostoma evotis LC
      - White-throated round-eared bat, Lophostoma silvicolum LC
    - Genus: Macrophyllum
      - Long-legged bat, Macrophyllum macrophyllum LC
    - Genus: Macrotus
      - Waterhouse's leaf-nosed bat, Macrotus waterhousii LC
    - Genus: Micronycteris
      - Hairy big-eared bat, Micronycteris hirsuta LC
      - White-bellied big-eared bat, Micronycteris minuta LC
      - Schmidts's big-eared bat, Micronycteris schmidtorum LC
    - Genus: Mimon
      - Cozumelan golden bat, Mimon cozumelae LC
      - Striped hairy-nosed bat, Mimon crenulatum LC
    - Genus: Phylloderma
      - Pale-faced bat, Phylloderma stenops LC
    - Genus: Phyllostomus
      - Pale spear-nosed bat, Phyllostomus discolor LC
      - Greater spear-nosed bat, Phyllostomus hastatus LC
    - Genus: Tonatia
      - Stripe-headed round-eared bat, Tonatia saurophila LC
    - Genus: Trachops
      - Fringe-lipped bat, Trachops cirrhosus LC
    - Genus: Trinycteris
      - Niceforo's big-eared bat, Trinycteris nicefori LC
    - Genus: Vampyrum
      - Spectral bat, Vampyrum spectrum NT
  - Subfamily: Glossophaginae
    - Genus: Anoura
      - Handley's tailless bat, Anoura cultrata NT
      - Geoffroy's tailless bat, Anoura geoffroyi LC
    - Genus: Choeroniscus
      - Godman's long-tailed bat, Choeroniscus godmani LC
    - Genus: Choeronycteris
      - Mexican long-tongued bat, Choeronycteris mexicana NT
    - Genus: Glossophaga
      - Commissaris's long-tongued bat, Glossophaga commissarisi LC
      - Gray long-tongued bat, Glossophaga leachii LC
      - Western long-tongued bat, Glossophaga morenoi LC
      - Pallas's long-tongued bat, Glossophaga soricina LC
    - Genus: Hylonycteris
      - Underwood's long-tongued bat, Hylonycteris underwoodi LC
    - Genus: Leptonycteris
      - Southern long-nosed bat, Leptonycteris curasoae VU
      - Greater long-nosed bat, Leptonycteris nivalis EN
    - Genus: Lichonycteris
      - Dark long-tongued bat, Lichonycteris obscura LC
    - Genus: Lionycteris
      - Chestnut long-tongued bat, Lionycteris spurrelli LC
    - Genus: Lonchophylla
      - Goldman's nectar bat, Lonchophylla concava NT
      - Godman's nectar bat, Lonchophylla mordax LC
      - Orange nectar bat, Lonchophylla robusta LC
      - Thomas's nectar bat, Lonchophylla thomasi LC
  - Subfamily: Carolliinae
    - Genus: Carollia
      - Silky short-tailed bat, Carollia brevicauda LC
      - Chestnut short-tailed bat, Carollia castanea LC
      - Seba's short-tailed bat, Carollia perspicillata LC
      - Sowell's short-tailed bat, Carollia sowelli LC
      - Gray short-tailed bat, Carollia subrufa LC
  - Subfamily: Stenodermatinae
    - Genus: Ametrida
      - Little white-shouldered bat, Ametrida centurio LC
    - Genus: Artibeus
      - Honduran fruit-eating bat, Artibeus inopinatus DD
      - Jamaican fruit bat, Artibeus jamaicensis LC
      - Great fruit-eating bat, Artibeus lituratus LC
    - Genus: Centurio
      - Wrinkle-faced bat, Centurio senex LC
    - Genus: Chiroderma
      - Salvin's big-eyed bat, Chiroderma salvini LC
      - Little big-eyed bat, Chiroderma trinitatum LC
      - Hairy big-eyed bat, Chiroderma villosum LC
    - Genus: Dermanura
      - Aztec fruit-eating bat, Dermanura azteca LC
      - Pygmy fruit-eating bat, Dermanura phaeotis LC
      - Toltec fruit-eating bat, Dermanura tolteca LC
      - Thomas's fruit-eating bat, Dermanura watsoni LC
        - Solitary fruit-eating bat, Dermanura watsoni incomitata CR
    - Genus: Ectophylla
      - Honduran white bat, Ectophylla alba NT
    - Genus: Enchisthenes
      - Velvety fruit-eating bat, Enchisthenes hartii LC
    - Genus: Mesophylla
      - MacConnell's bat, Mesophylla macconnelli LC
    - Genus: Platyrrhinus
      - Thomas's broad-nosed bat, Platyrrhinus dorsalis LC
      - Heller's broad-nosed bat, Platyrrhinus helleri LC
      - Greater broad-nosed bat, Platyrrhinus vittatus LC
    - Genus: Sturnira
      - Little yellow-shouldered bat, Sturnira lilium LC
      - Highland yellow-shouldered bat, Sturnira ludovici LC
      - Louis's yellow-shouldered bat, Sturnira luisi LC
      - Talamancan yellow-shouldered bat, Sturnira mordax NT
    - Genus: Uroderma
      - Tent-making bat, Uroderma bilobatum LC
      - Brown tent-making bat, Uroderma magnirostrum LC
    - Genus: Vampyressa
      - Striped yellow-eared bat, Vampyressa nymphaea LC
    - Genus: Vampyrodes
      - Great stripe-faced bat, Vampyrodes caraccioli LC
  - Subfamily: Desmodontinae
    - Genus: Desmodus
      - Common vampire bat, Desmodus rotundus LC
    - Genus: Diaemus
      - White-winged vampire bat, Diaemus youngi LC
    - Genus: Diphylla
      - Hairy-legged vampire bat, Diphylla ecaudata LC
- Family: Natalidae (funnel-eared bats)
    - Genus: Natalus
      - Mexican greater funnel-eared bat, Natalus mexicanus LC
- Family: Furipteridae
    - Genus: Furipterus
      - Thumbless bat, Furipterus horrens LC
- Family: Thyropteridae
    - Genus: Thyroptera
      - Peters's disk-winged bat, Thyroptera discifera LC
      - Spix's disk-winged bat, Thyroptera tricolor LC

===== Order: Carnivora (carnivorans) =====
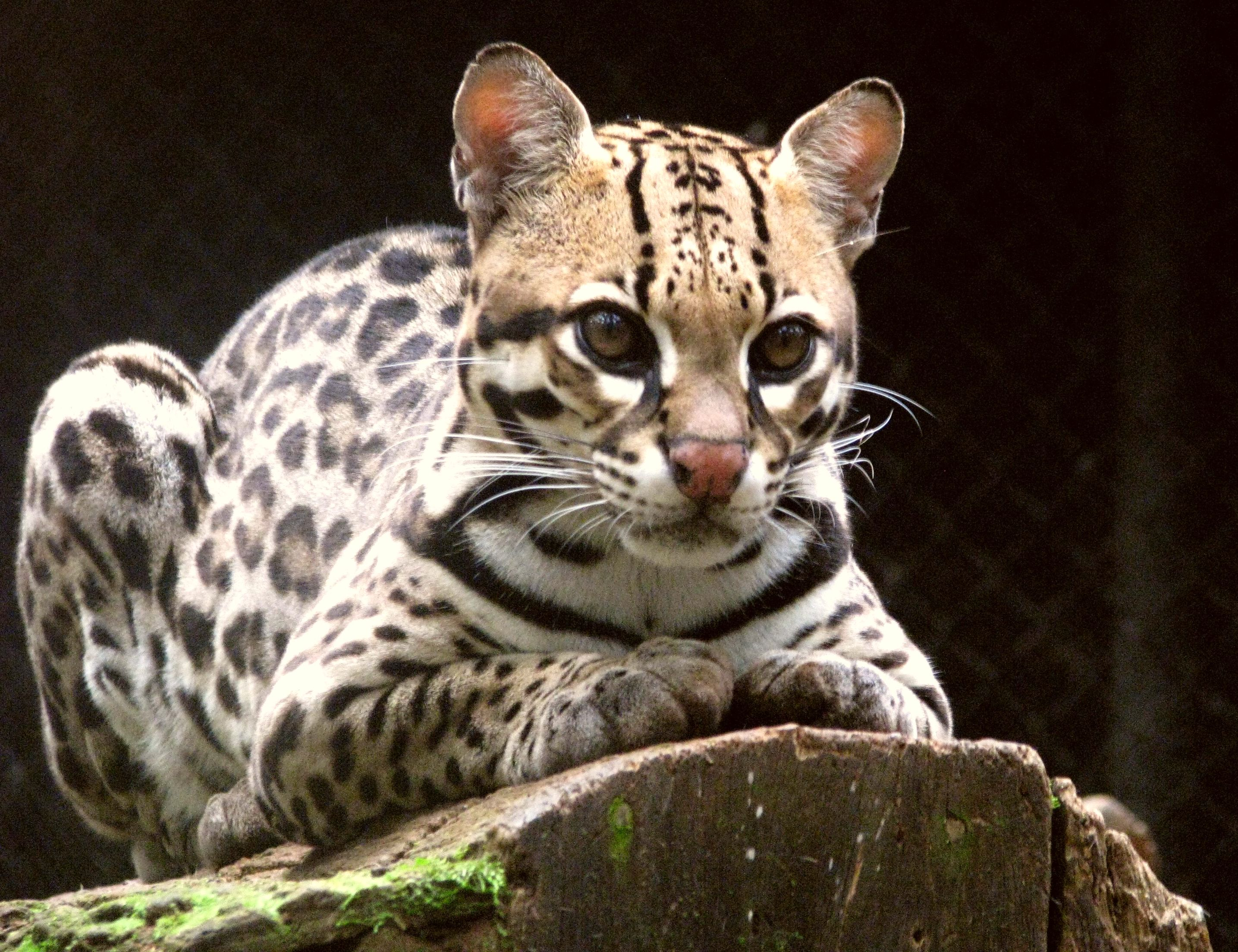
Ocelot

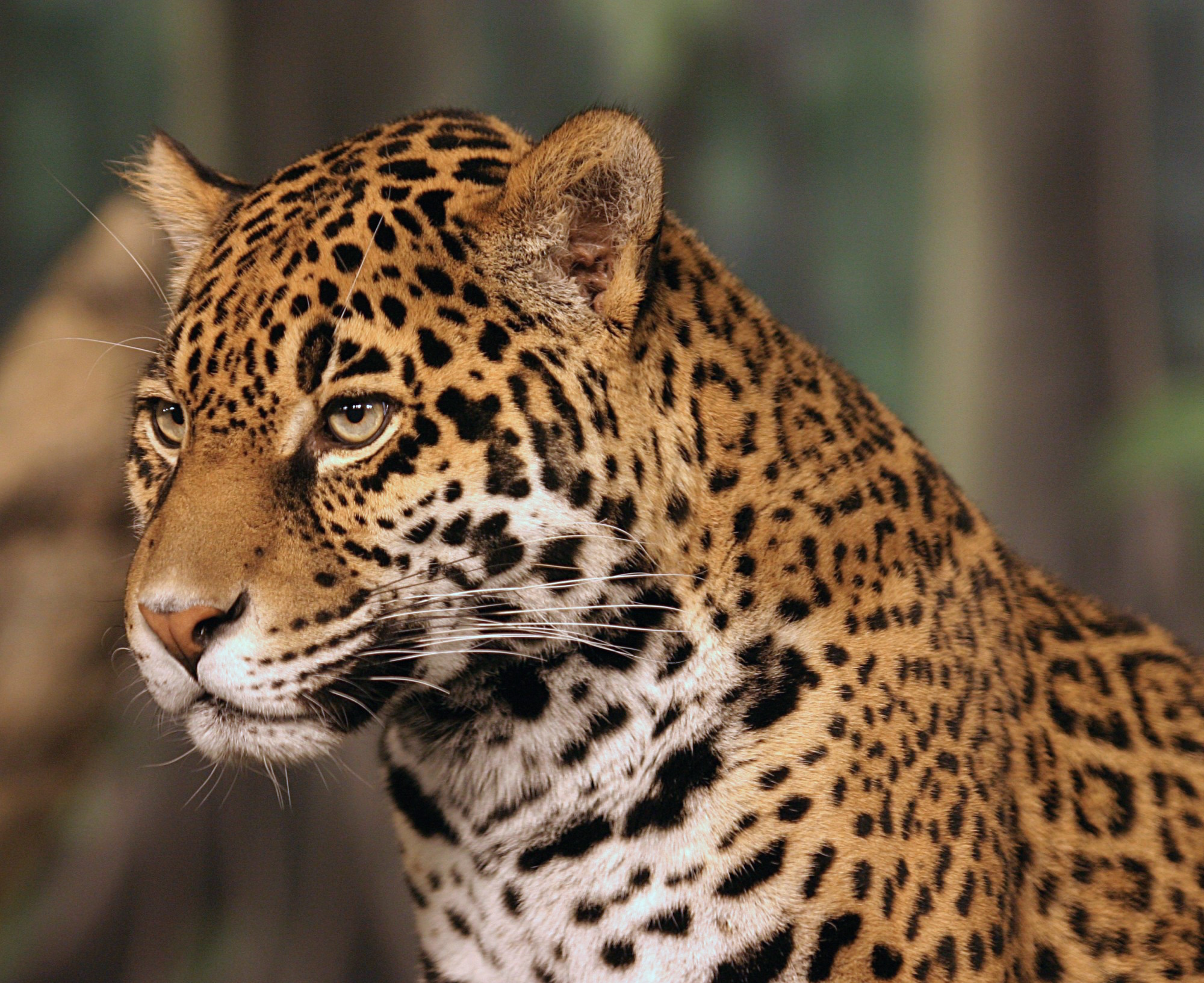
Jaguar

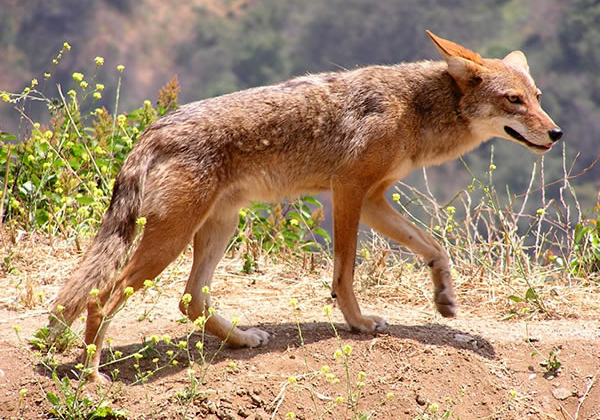
Coyote

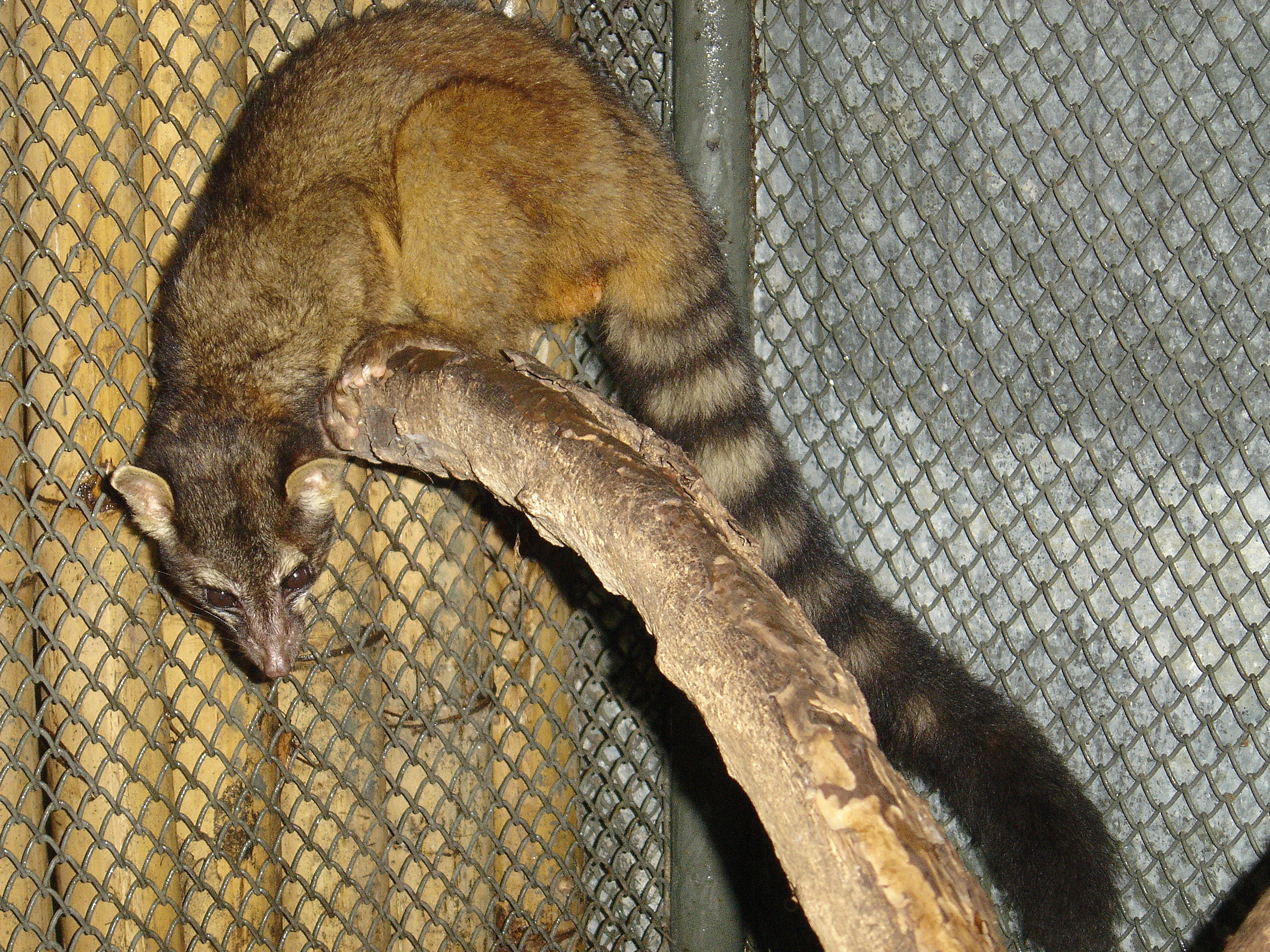
Cacomistle

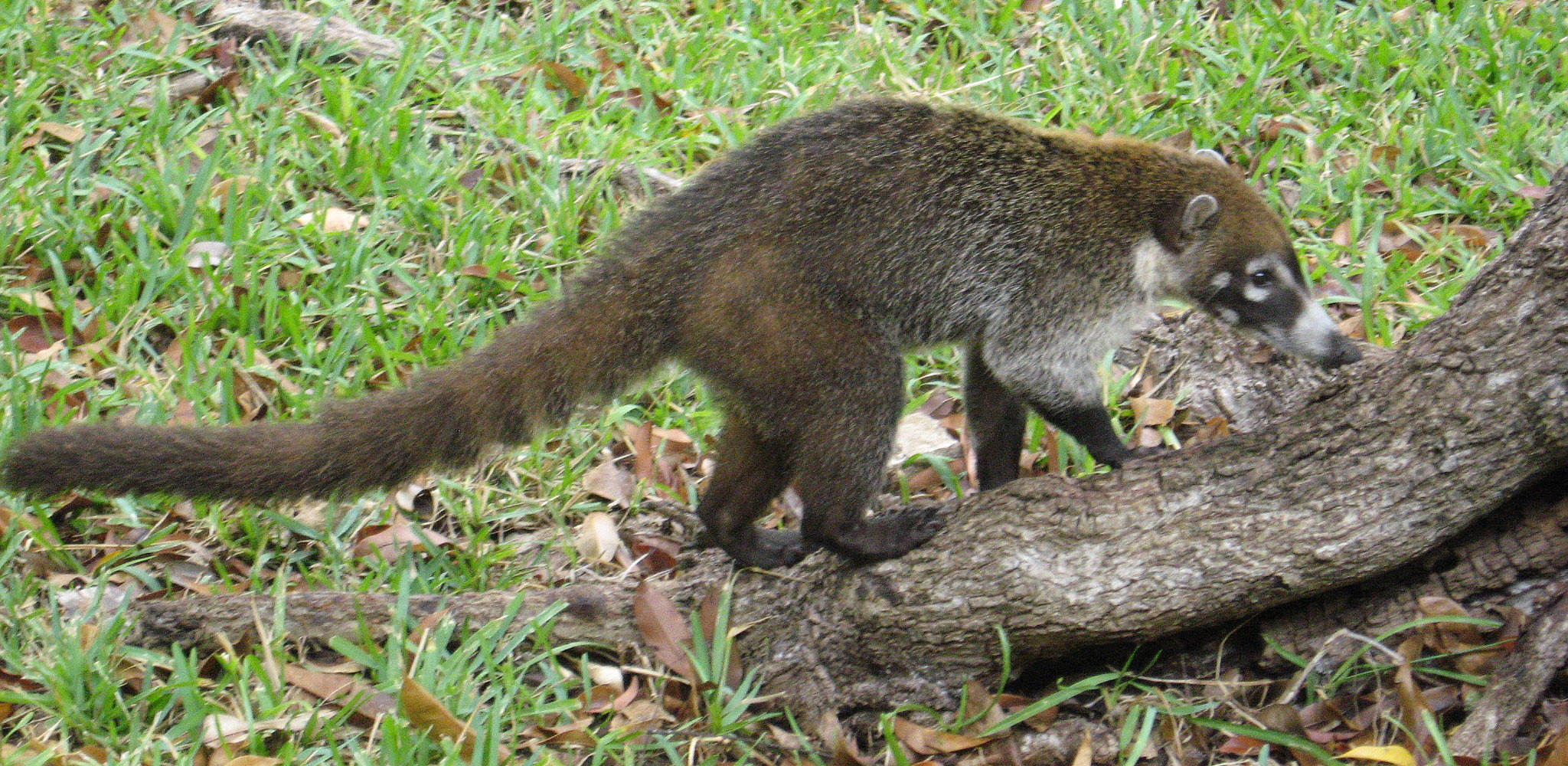
White-nosed coati

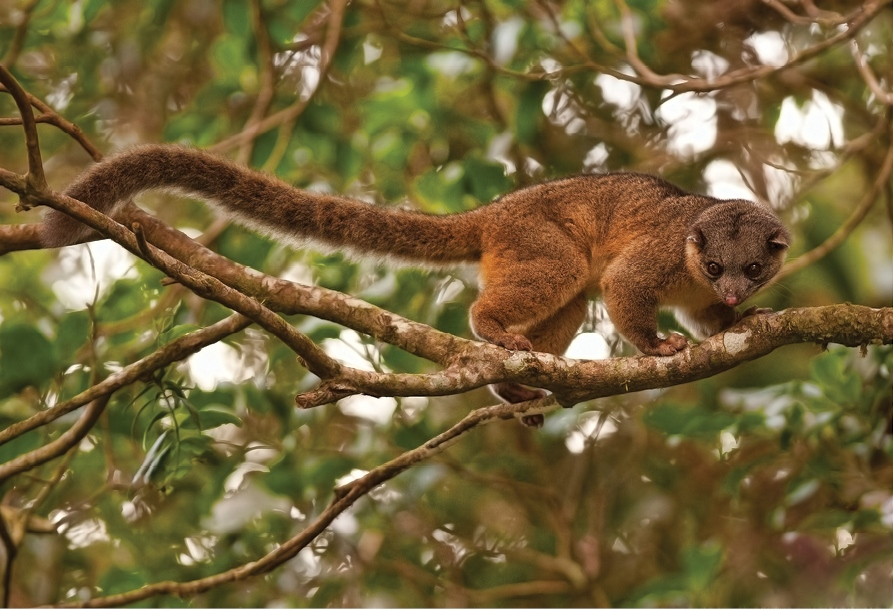
Northern olingo

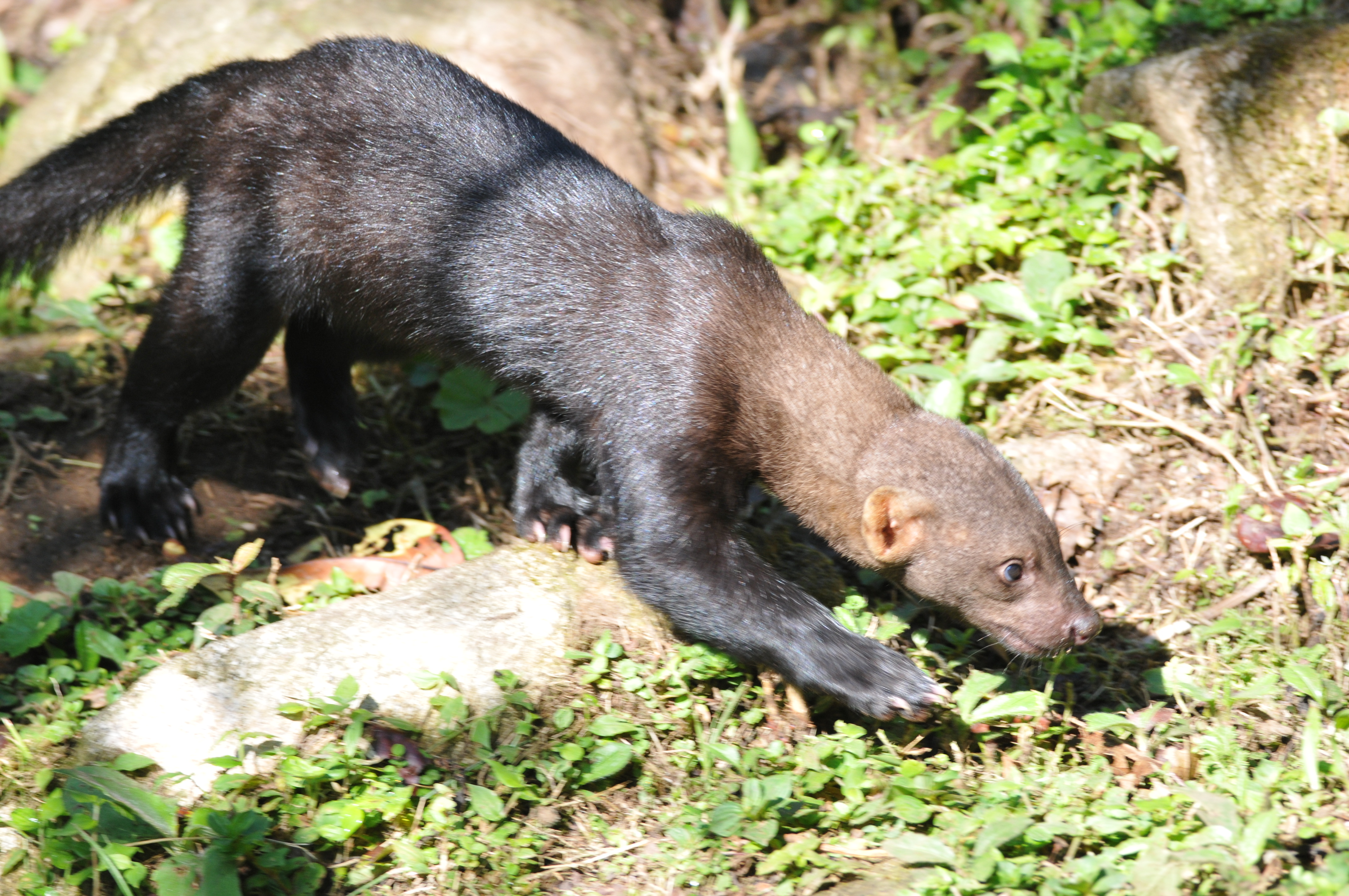
Tayra

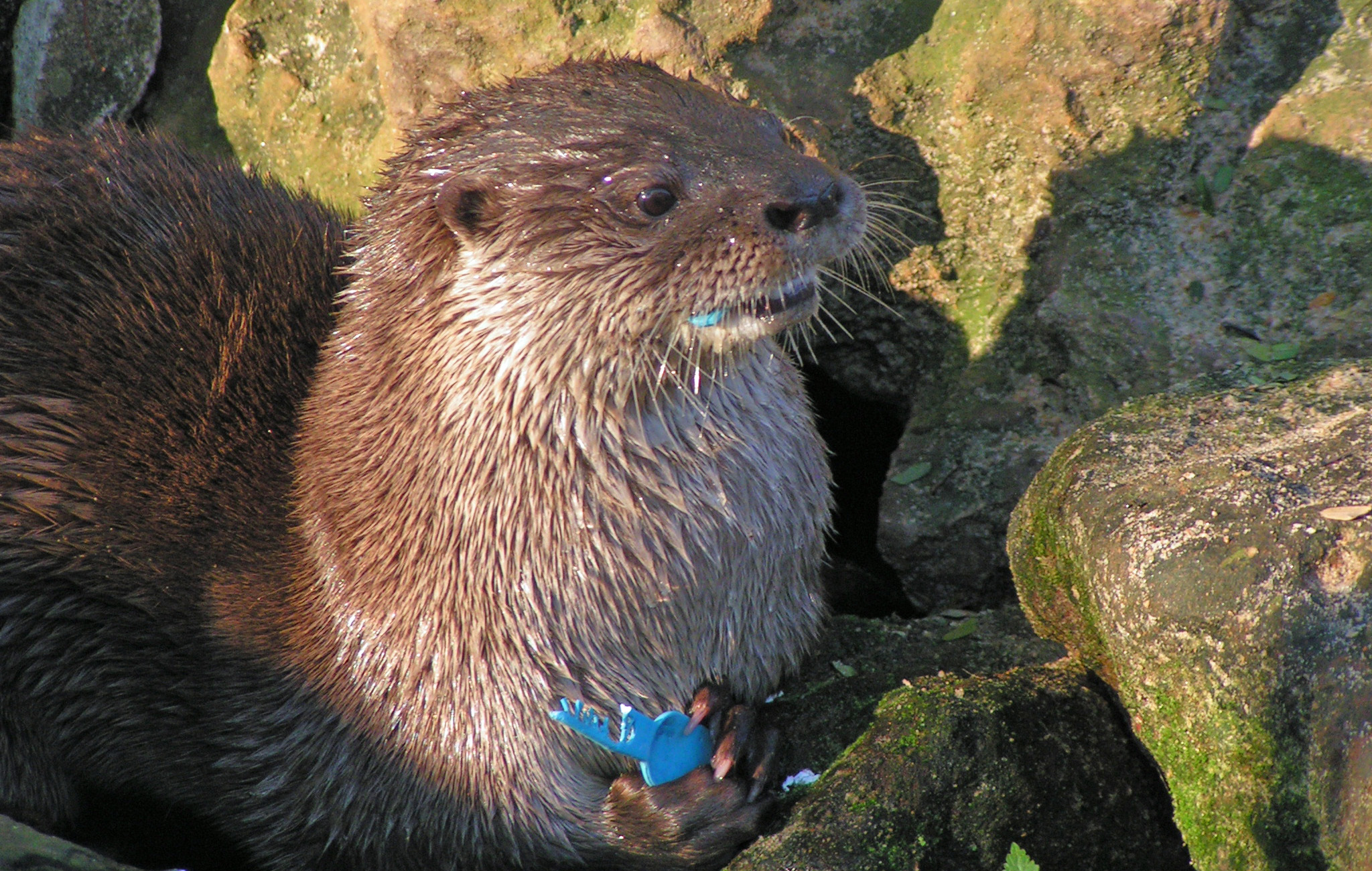
Neotropical otter

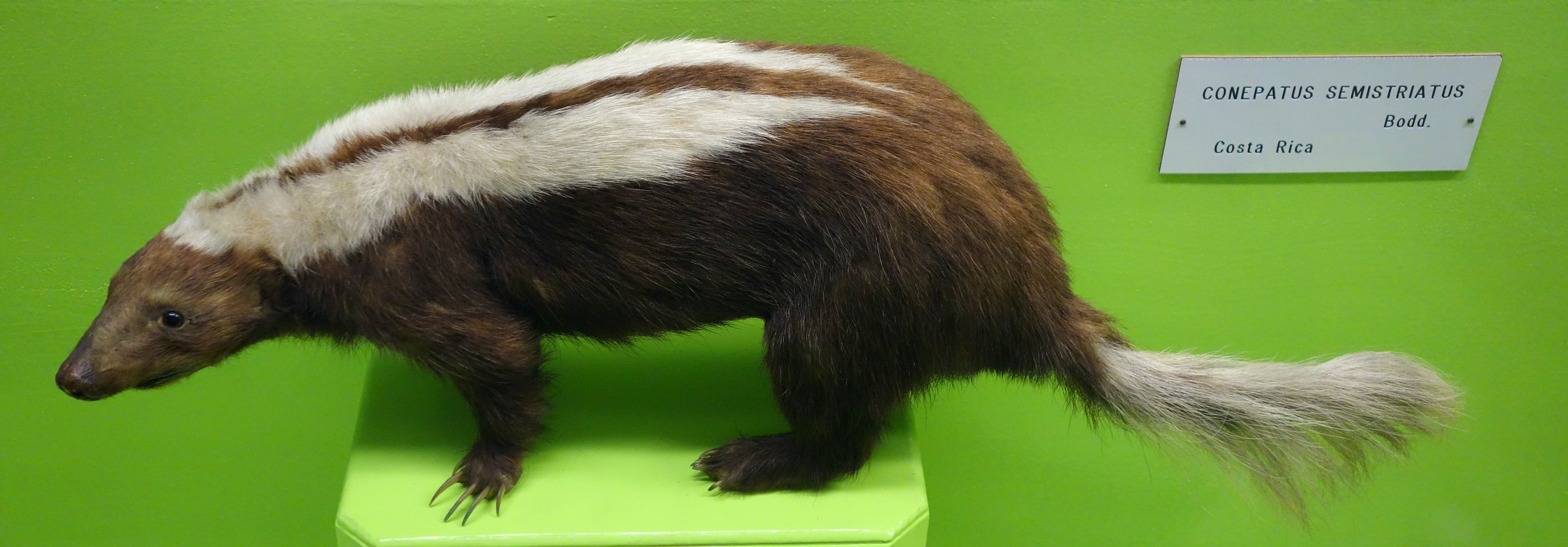
Striped hog-nosed skunk

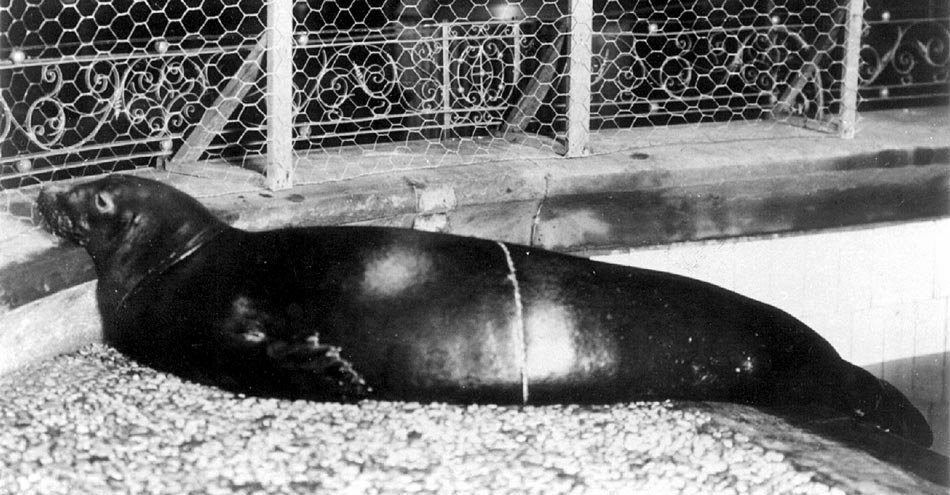
Caribbean monk seal

There are over 260 species of carnivorans, the majority of which feed primarily on meat. They have a characteristic skull shape and dentition. All of Central America's terrestrial carnivorans are of Nearctic origin. Central America has the greatest diversity of procyonids in the world. Large extinct carnivorans that lived in the area prior to the coming of humans include the saber-toothed cat Smilodon fatalis, the scimitar cat Homotherium serum, American lions, dire wolves and short-faced bears.

- Suborder: Feliformia
  - Family: Felidae (cats)
    - Subfamily: Felinae
      - Genus: Herpailurus
        - Jaguarundi, H. yagouaroundi LC
      - Genus: Leopardus
        - Ocelot, Leopardus pardalis LC
        - Oncilla, Leopardus tigrinus VU
        - Margay, Leopardus wiedii NT
      - Genus: Puma
        - Cougar, Puma concolor LC
    - Subfamily: Pantherinae
      - Genus: Panthera
        - Jaguar, Panthera onca NT
- Suborder: Caniformia
  - Family: Canidae (dogs, foxes)
    - Subfamily: Caninae
      - Genus: Canis
        - Coyote, Canis latrans LC
      - Genus: Cerdocyon
        - Crab-eating fox, Cerdocyon thous LC
      - Genus: Speothos
        - Bush dog, Speothos venaticus NT
      - Genus: Urocyon
        - Gray fox, Urocyon cinereoargenteus LC
  - Family: Ursidae (bears)
    - Subfamily: Tremarctinae
      - Genus: Tremarctos
        - Spectacled bear, Tremarctos ornatus VU
  - Family: Procyonidae (raccoons, coatis and relatives)
    - Genus: Bassariscus
      - Ringtail, Bassariscus astutus LC
      - Cacomistle, Bassariscus sumichrasti LC
    - Genus: Procyon
      - Crab-eating raccoon, Procyon cancrivorus LC
      - Common raccoon, Procyon lotor LC
      - Cozumel Island raccoon, Procyon pygmaeus CR
    - Genus: Nasua
      - White-nosed coati, Nasua narica LC
        - Cozumel Island coati, N. n. nelsoni EN
    - Genus: Bassaricyon
      - Northern olingo, Bassaricyon gabbii LC
      - Western lowland olingo, Bassaricyon medius LC
    - Genus: Potos
      - Kinkajou, Potos flavus LC
  - Family: Mustelidae (weasels, otters)
    - Subfamily: Guloninae
      - Genus: Eira
        - Tayra, Eira barbara LC
    - Subfamily: Ictonychinae
      - Genus: Galictis
        - Greater grison, Galictis vittata LC
    - Subfamily: Mustelinae
      - Genus: Neogale
        - Long-tailed weasel, N. frenata LC
    - Subfamily: Lutrinae
      - Genus: Lontra
        - Neotropical otter, Lontra longicaudis NT
  - Family: Mephitidae (skunks)
    - Genus: Spilogale
      - Southern spotted skunk, Spilogale angustifrons LC
      - Pygmy spotted skunk, Spilogale pygmaea VU
    - Genus: Mephitis
      - Hooded skunk, Mephitis macroura LC
    - Genus: Conepatus
      - American hog-nosed skunk, Conepatus leuconotus LC
      - Striped hog-nosed skunk, Conepatus semistriatus LC
  - Clade: Pinnipedia (seals, sea lions and walruses)
    - Family: Phocidae (earless seals)
      - Subfamily: Monachinae
        - Genus: Neomonachus
          - Caribbean monk seal, N. tropicalis EX

===== Order: Perissodactyla (odd-toed ungulates) =====
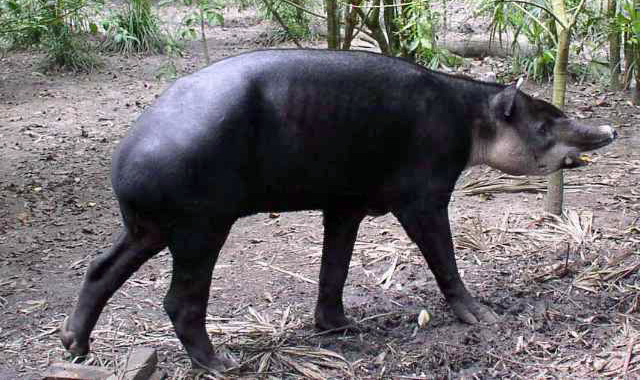
Baird's tapir

The odd-toed ungulates are browsing and grazing mammals. They are usually large to very large, and have relatively simple stomachs and a large middle toe. While native equids once lived in the region, having evolved in North America over a period of 50 million years, they died out around the time of the first arrival of humans, along with at least one ungulate of South American origin, the notoungulate, Mixotoxodon. Sequencing of collagen from a fossil of one recently extinct notoungulate has indicated that this order was closer to the perissodactyls than any extant mammal order.

- Family: Tapiridae (tapirs)
    - Genus: Tapirus
      - Baird's tapir, Tapirus bairdii EN

===== Order: Artiodactyla (even-toed ungulates and cetaceans) =====
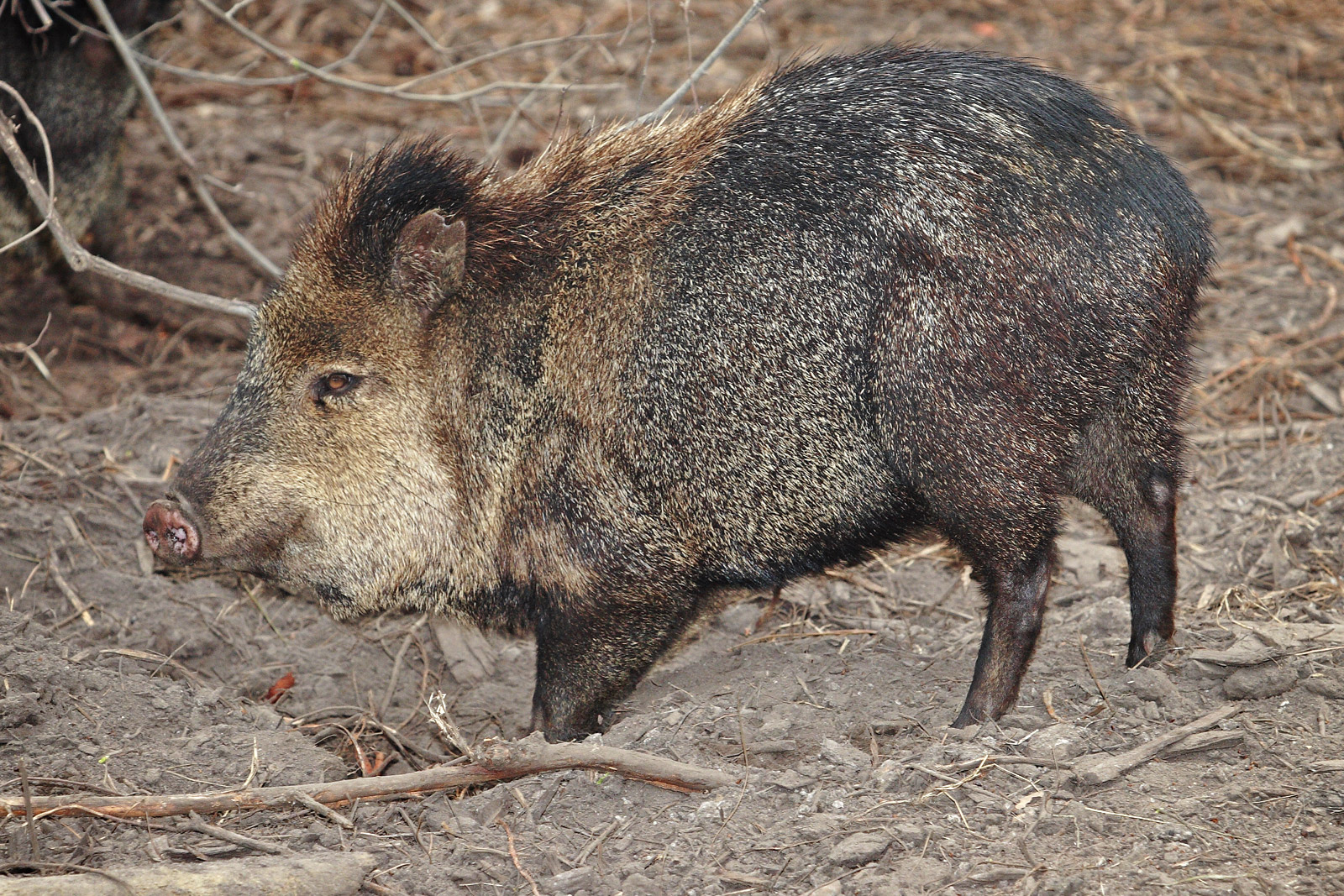
Collared peccary

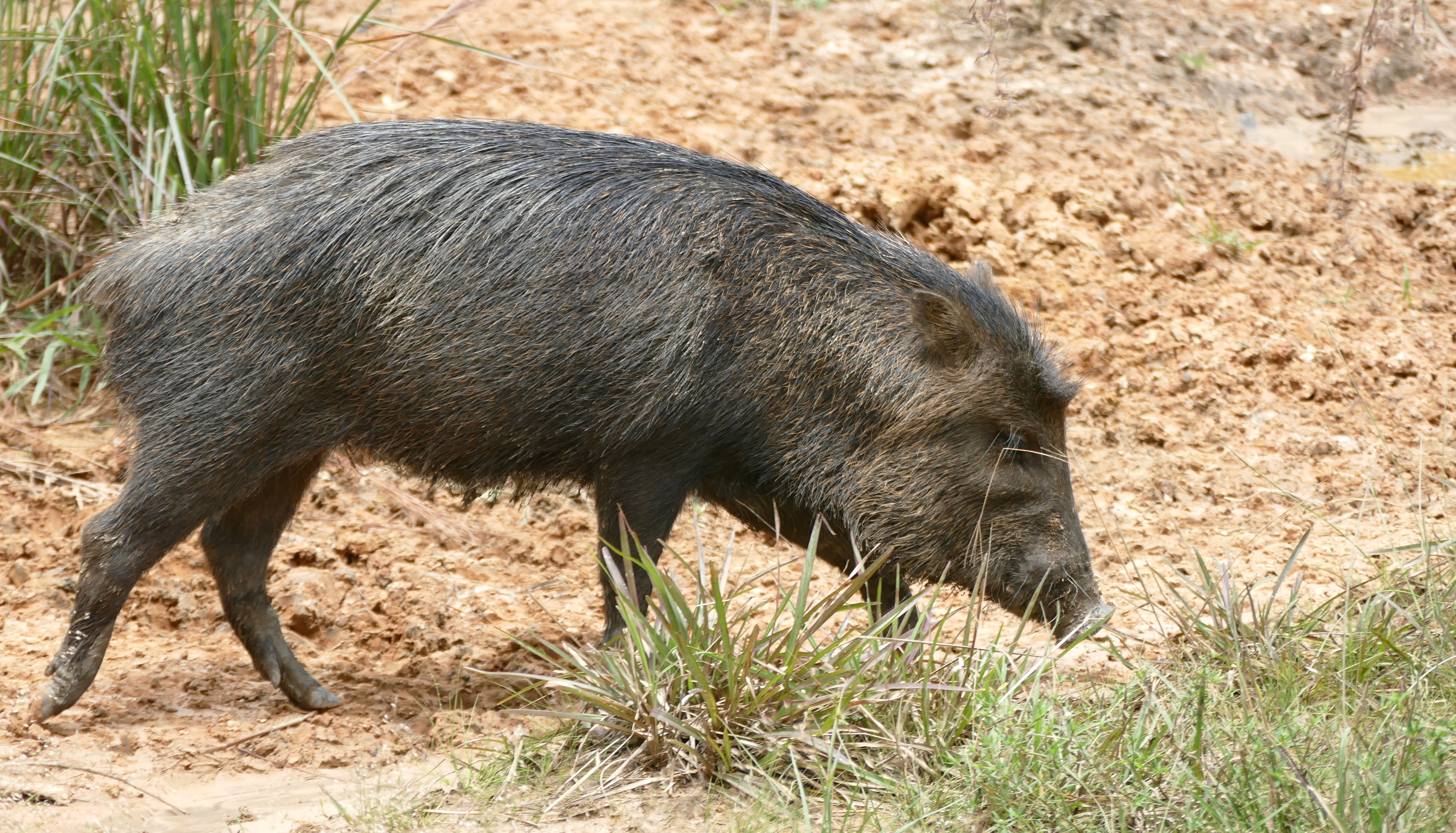
White-lipped peccary

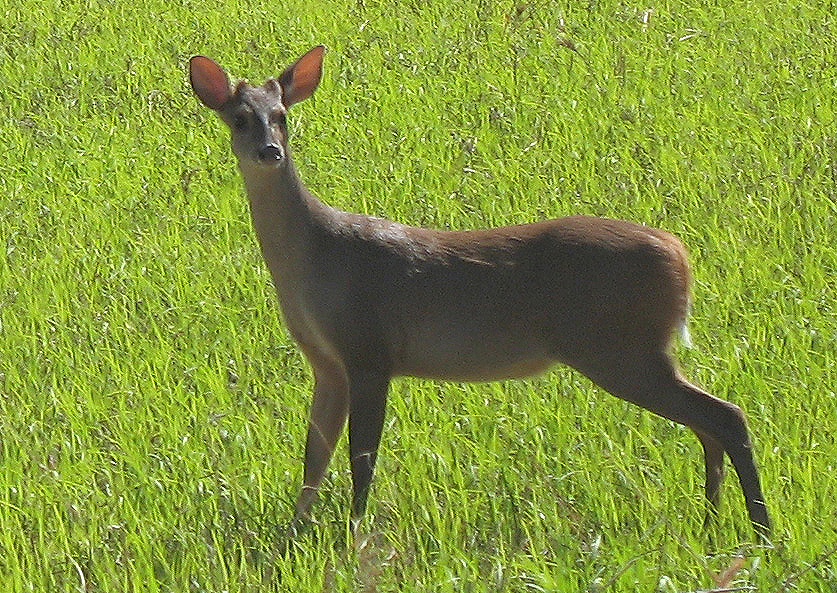
Red brocket

The weight of even-toed ungulates is borne about equally by the third and fourth toes, rather than mostly or entirely by the third as in perissodactyls. There are about 220 noncetacean artiodactyl species, including many that are of great economic importance to humans. All of Central America's extant ungulates are of Nearctic origin. Prior to the arrival of humans, Nearctic camelids also lived in the region.

- Family: Tayassuidae (peccaries)
  - Genus: Dicotyles
    - Collared peccary, Dicotyles tajacu LC
  - Genus: Tayassu
    - White-lipped peccary, Tayassu pecari NT
- Family: Cervidae (deer)
  - Subfamily: Capreolinae
    - Genus: Mazama
      - Amazonian brown brocket, Mazama nemorivaga LC
      - Central American red brocket, Mazama temama DD
    - Genus: Odocoileus
      - Yucatan brown brocket, O. pandora VU
      - White-tailed deer, O. virginianus LC

====== Infraorder: Cetacea (whales, dolphins and porpoises) ======
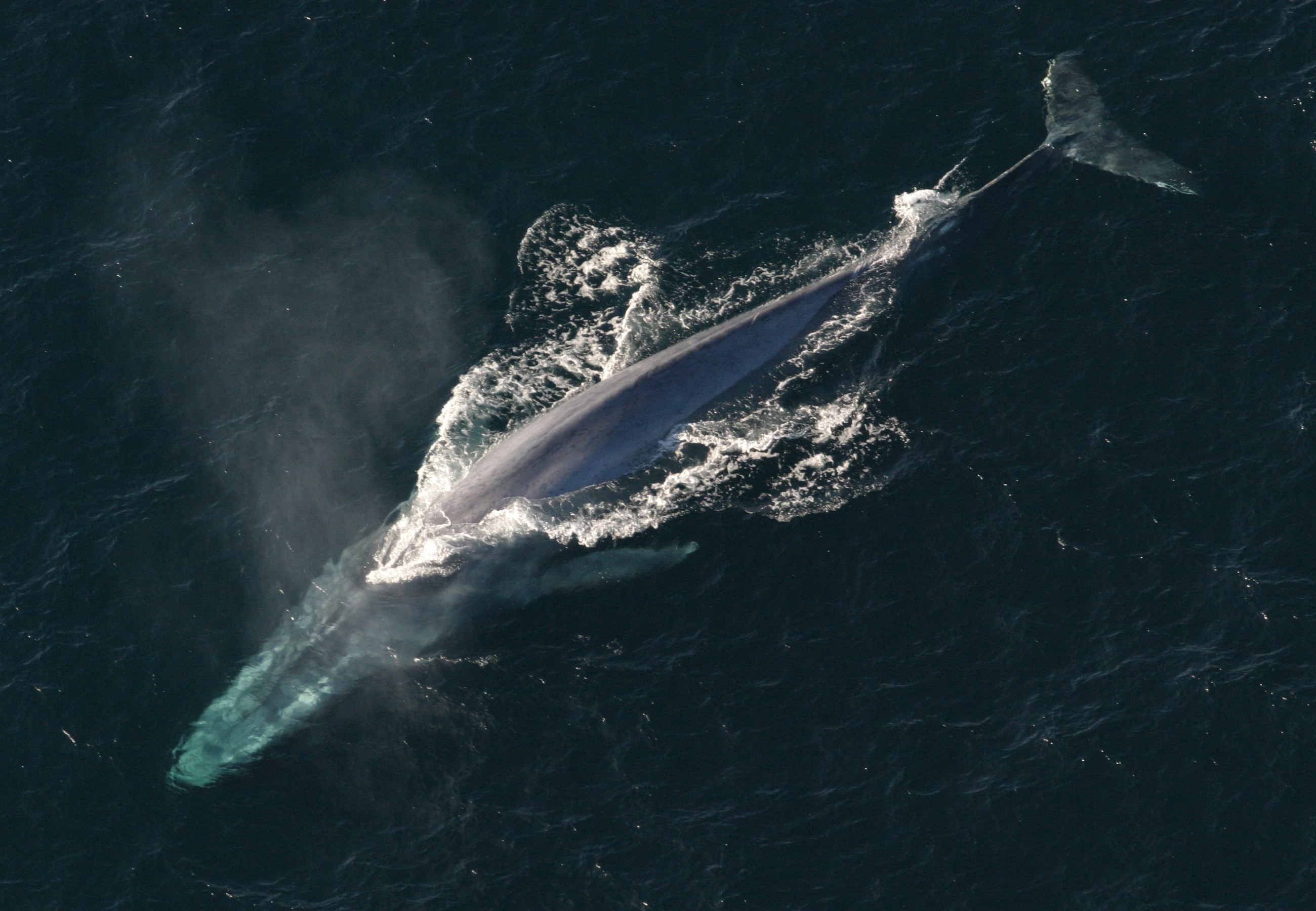
Blue whale

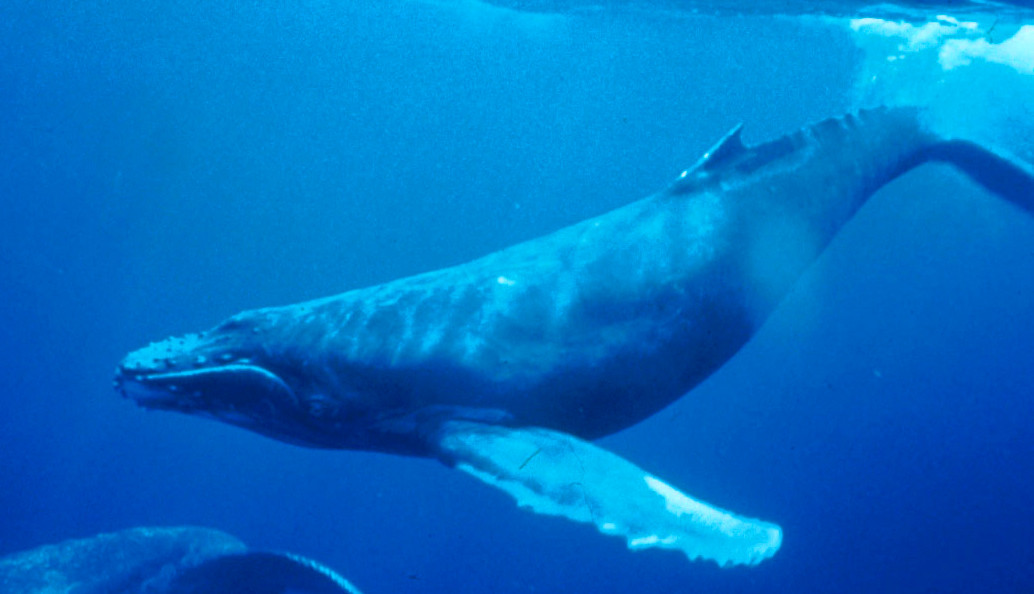
Humpback whale

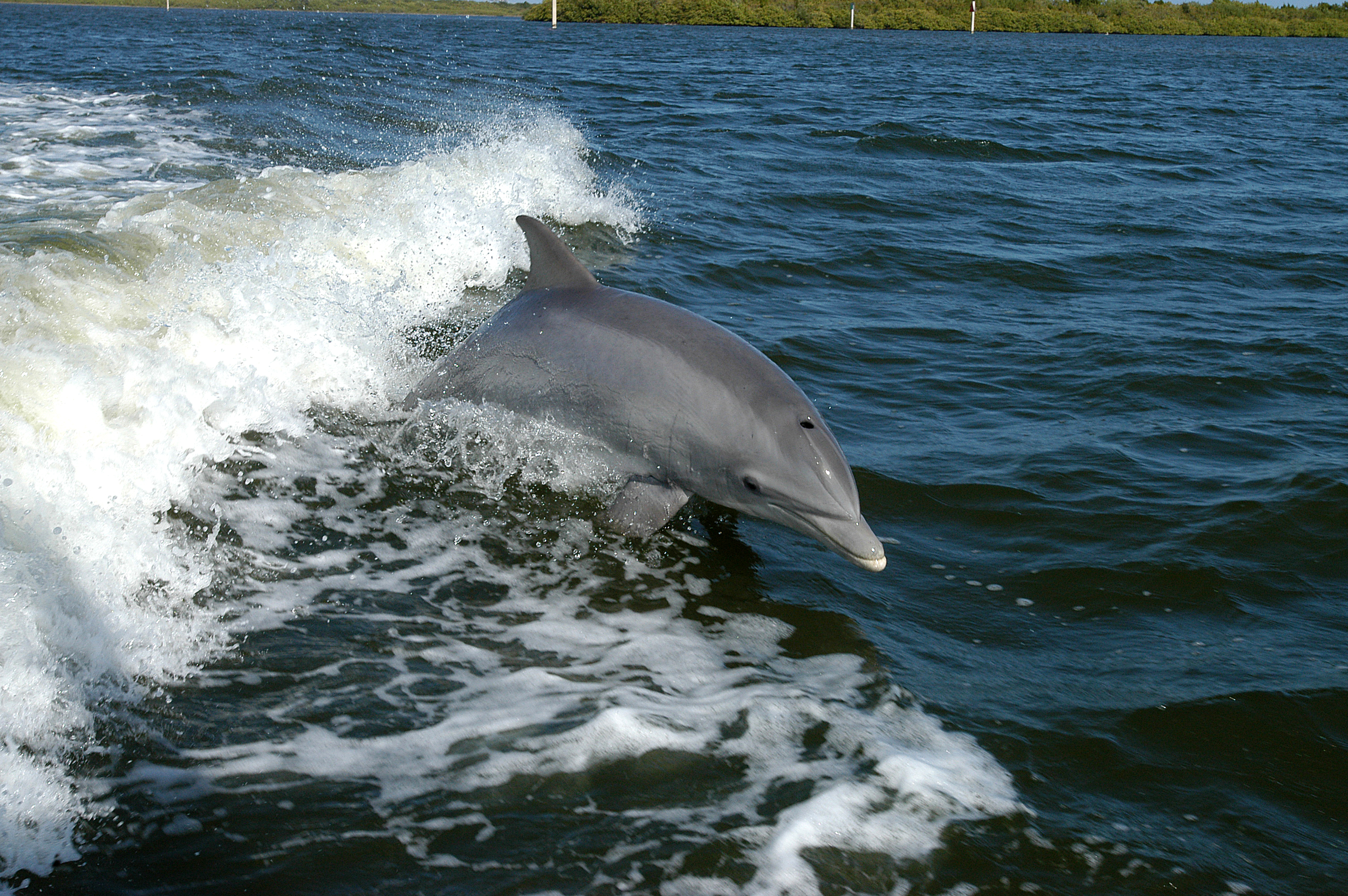
Bottlenose dolphin

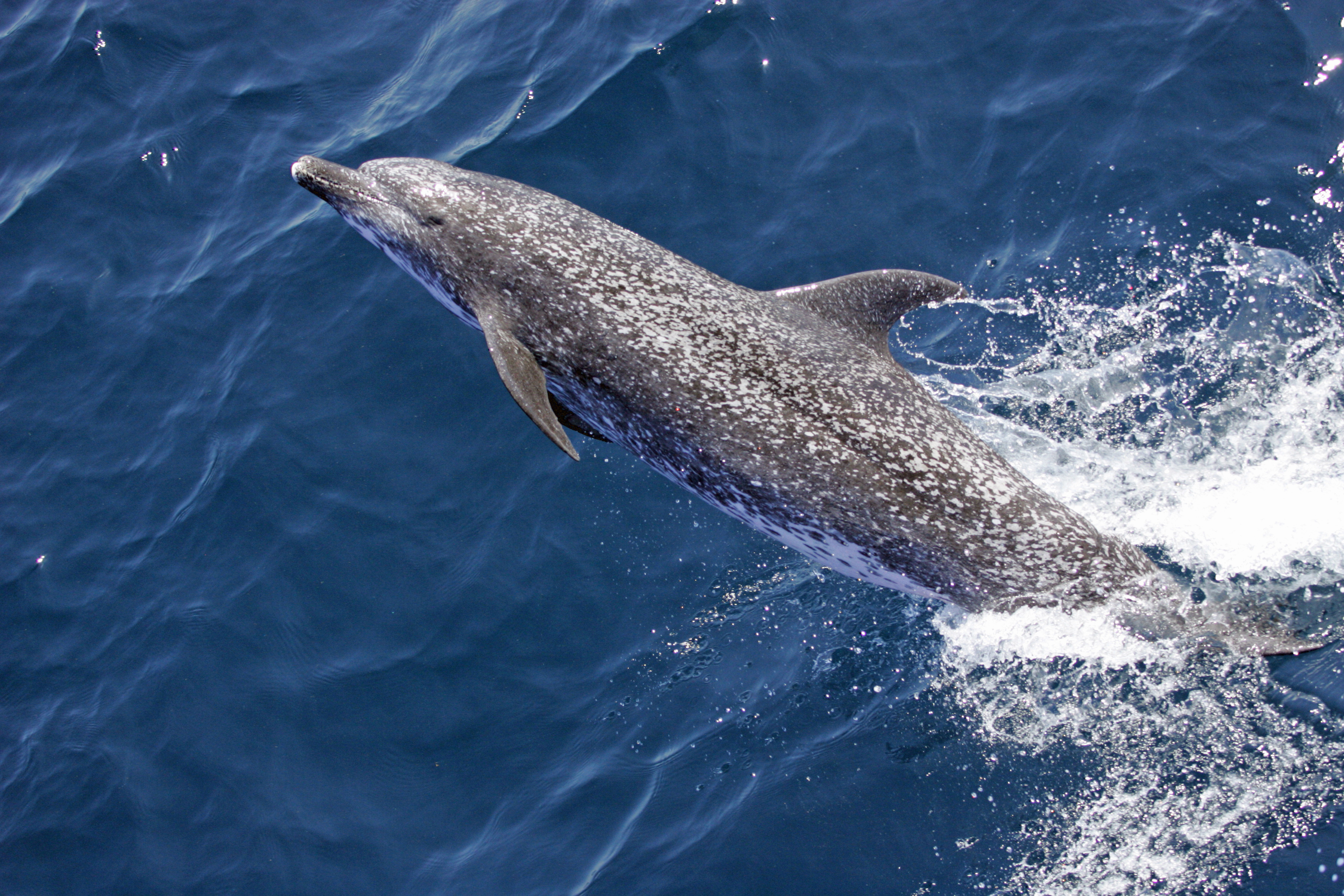
Atlantic spotted dolphin

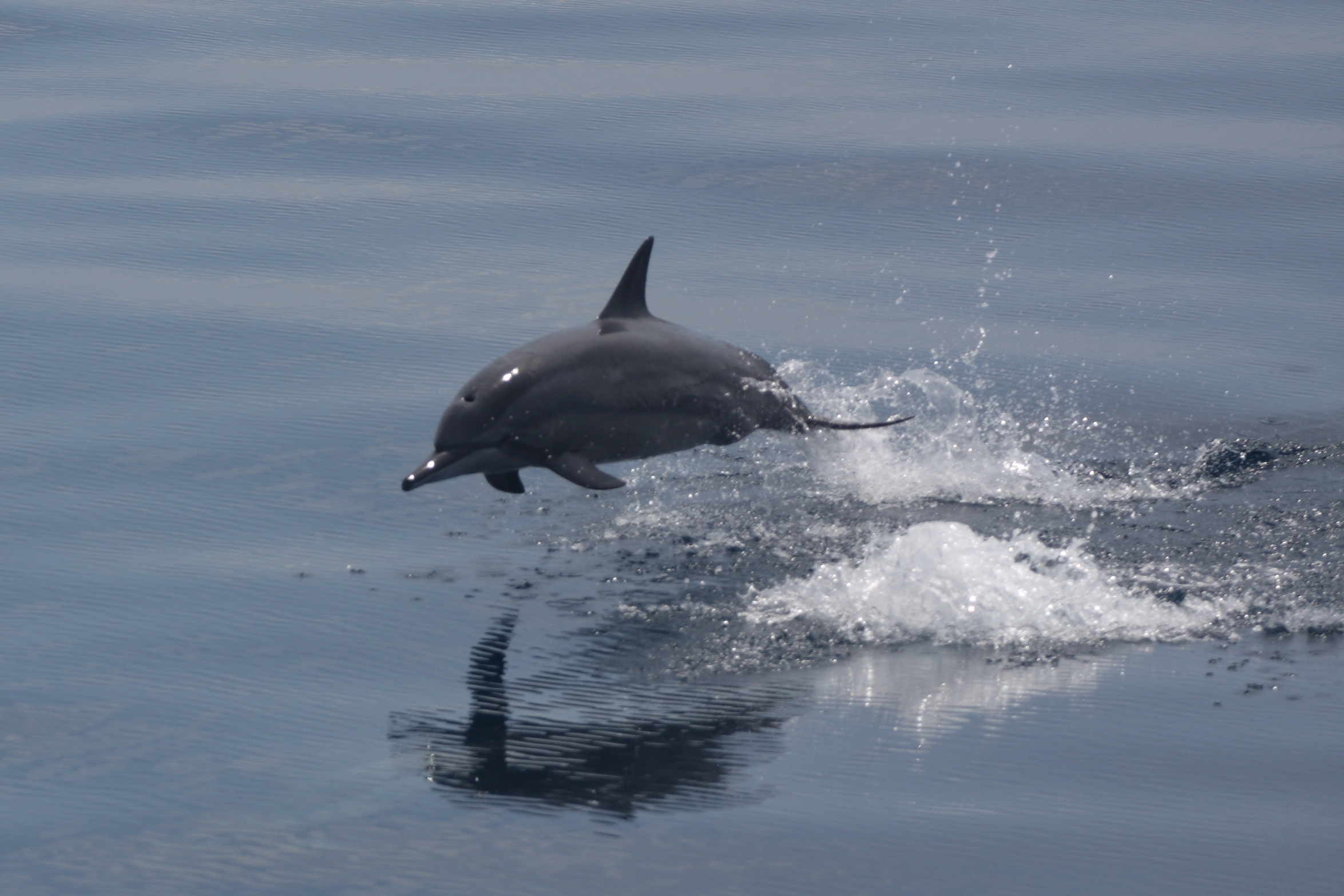
Spinner dolphin

Fraser's dolphin

Orca

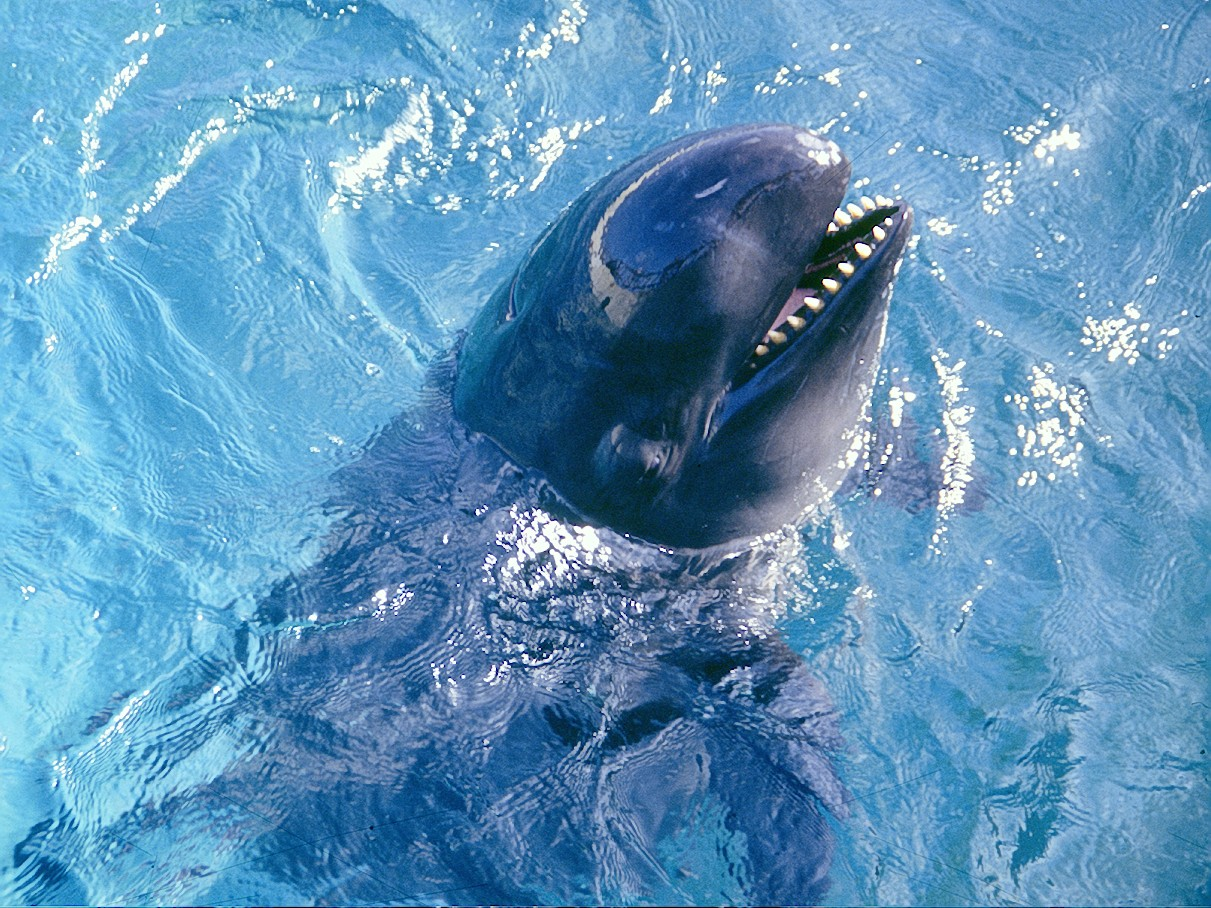
False killer whale

The infraorder Cetacea includes whales, dolphins and porpoises. They are the mammals most fully adapted to aquatic life with a spindle-shaped nearly hairless body, protected by a thick layer of blubber, and forelimbs and tail modified to provide propulsion underwater. Their closest extant relatives are the hippos, which are artiodactyls, from which cetaceans descended; cetaceans are thus also artiodactyls.

- Parvorder: Mysticeti
  - Family: Balaenopteridae (rorquals)
    - Subfamily: Balaenopterinae
      - Genus: Balaenoptera
        - Bryde's whale, Balaenoptera edeni DD
        - Blue whale, Balaenoptera musculus EN
        - Fin whale, Balaenoptera physalus VU
    - Subfamily: Megapterinae
      - Genus: Megaptera
        - Humpback whale, Megaptera novaeangliae LC
- Parvorder: Odontoceti
  - Family: Physeteridae (sperm whales)
    - Genus: Physeter
      - Sperm whale, Physeter macrocephalus VU
  - Family: Kogiidae (pygmy and dwarf sperm whales)
    - Genus: Kogia
      - Pygmy sperm whale, Kogia breviceps DD
      - Dwarf sperm whale, Kogia sima DD
  - Family: Ziphidae (beaked whales)
    - Genus: Ziphius
      - Cuvier's beaked whale, Ziphius cavirostris LC
    - Genus: Mesoplodon
      - Blainville's beaked whale, Mesoplodon densirostris DD
      - Ginkgo-toothed beaked whale, Mesoplodon ginkgodens DD
      - Pygmy beaked whale, Mesoplodon peruvianus DD
  - Family: Delphinidae (marine dolphins)
    - Genus: Steno
      - Rough-toothed dolphin, Steno bredanensis LC
    - Genus: Sotalia
      - Guiana dolphin, Sotalia guianensis NT
    - Genus: Tursiops
      - Bottlenose dolphin, Tursiops truncatus LC
    - Genus: Stenella
      - Pantropical spotted dolphin, Stenella attenuata LC
      - Clymene dolphin, Stenella clymene LC
      - Striped dolphin, Stenella coeruleoalba LC
      - Atlantic spotted dolphin, Stenella frontalis LC
      - Spinner dolphin, Stenella longirostris LC
    - Genus: Delphinus
      - Long-beaked common dolphin, Delphinus capensis DD
      - Short-beaked common dolphin, Delphinus delphis LC
    - Genus: Lagenodelphis
      - Fraser's dolphin, Lagenodelphis hosei LC
    - Genus: Grampus
      - Risso's dolphin, Grampus griseus LC
    - Genus: Peponocephala
      - Melon-headed whale, Peponocephala electra LC
    - Genus: FeresaLC
      - Pygmy killer whale, Feresa attenuata LC
    - Genus: Orcinus
      - Orca, Orcinus orca DD
    - Genus: Pseudorca
      - False killer whale, Pseudorca crassidens NT
    - Genus: Globicephala
      - Short-finned pilot whale, Globicephala macrorhynchus LC

== See also ==
- List of chordate orders
- Lists of mammals by region
- List of prehistoric mammals
- Mammal classification
- List of mammals described in the 2000s

== Lists of Western Hemisphere mammals from north to south ==
List of mammals of Greenland

List of mammals of Mexico

List of mammals of Antarctica
