= List of mephitids =

Species in mammal family Mephitidae

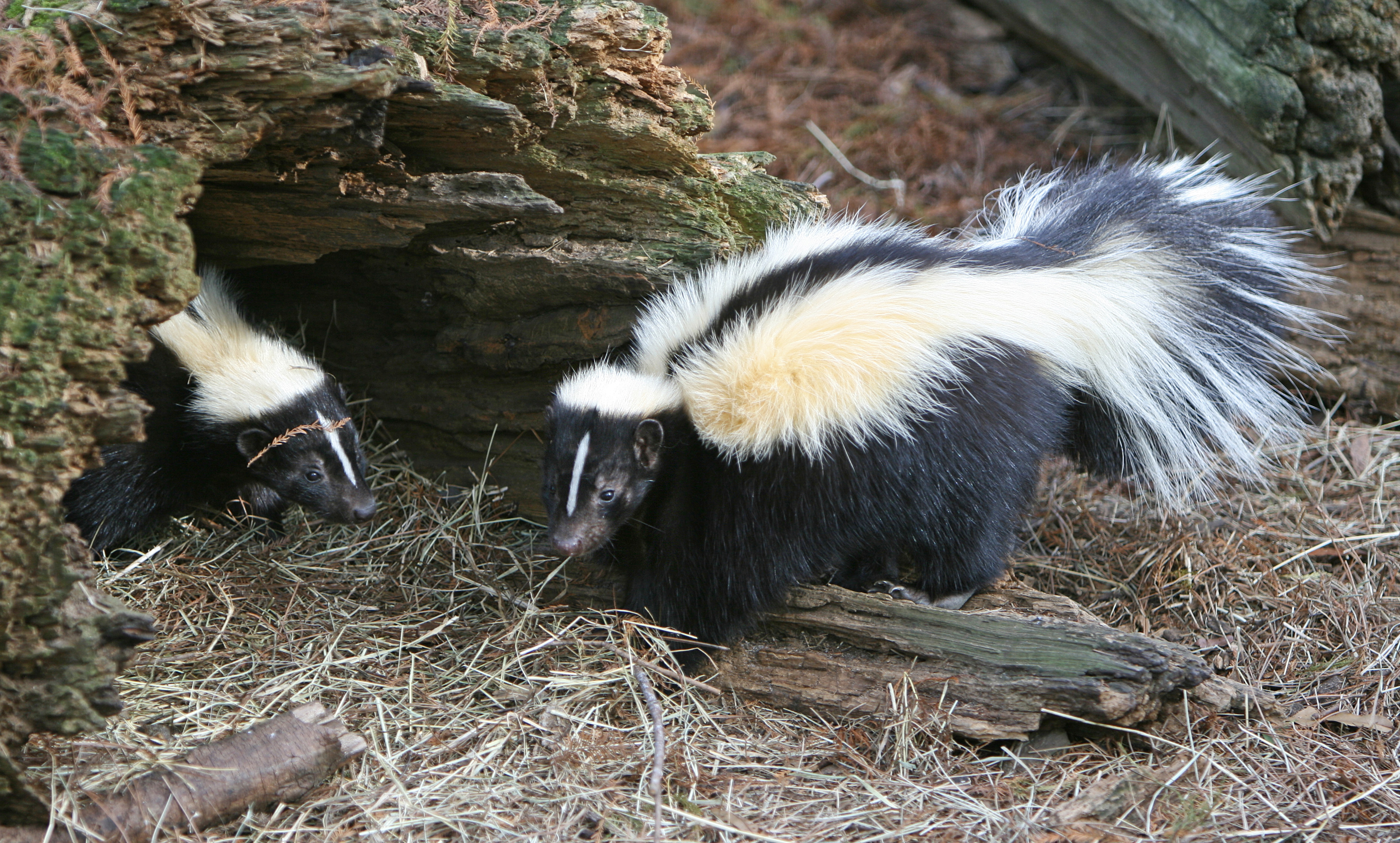
Striped skunks (Mephitis mephitis)

Mephitidae is a family of mammals in the order Carnivora, which comprises the skunks and stink badgers. A member of this family is called a mephitid. The skunks of the family are widespread across the Americas, while the stink badgers are in the Greater Sunda Islands of southeast Asia. Species inhabit a variety of habitats, though typically grassland, forest, and shrubland. Most mephitids are 20–50 cm (8–20 in) long, plus a 10–40 cm (4–16 in) tail, though the pygmy spotted skunk can be as small as 11 cm (4 in) plus a 7 cm (3 in) tail, and some striped skunks can be up to 82 cm (32 in) plus a 40 cm (16 in) tail. No estimates have been made for overall population sizes of any of the species, but two species are classified as vulnerable. Mephitids in general are not domesticated, though skunks are sometimes kept as pets.

The twelve species of Mephitidae are split into four genera: the monotypic Conepatus, hog-nosed skunks; Mephitis, skunks; Mydaus, stink badgers; and Spilogale, spotted skunks. Mephitidae was traditionally a clade within the Mustelidae family, with the stink badgers combined with other badgers within the Melinae genus, but more recent genetic evidence resulted in the consensus to separate Mephitidae into its own family. Extinct species have also been placed into all of the extant genera besides Mydaus, as well as 9 extinct genera; 26 extinct Mephitidae species have been found, though due to ongoing research and discoveries the exact number and categorization is not fixed.

== Conventions ==
IUCN Red List categories
Conservation status
- EX: Extinct (0 species)
- EW: Extinct in the wild (0 species)
- CR: Critically endangered (0 species)
- EN: Endangered (0 species)
- VU: Vulnerable (2 species)
- NT: Near threatened (0 species)
- LC: Least concern (10 species)

The author citation for the species or genus is given after the scientific name; parentheses around the author citation indicate that this was not the original taxonomic placement. Conservation status codes listed follow the International Union for Conservation of Nature (IUCN) Red List of Threatened Species. Range maps are provided wherever possible; if a range map is not available, a description of the mephetid's range is provided. Ranges are based on the IUCN Red List for that species unless otherwise noted. All extinct species or subspecies listed alongside extant species went extinct after 1500 CE, and are indicated by a dagger symbol "†". Population figures are rounded to the nearest hundred.

== Classification ==
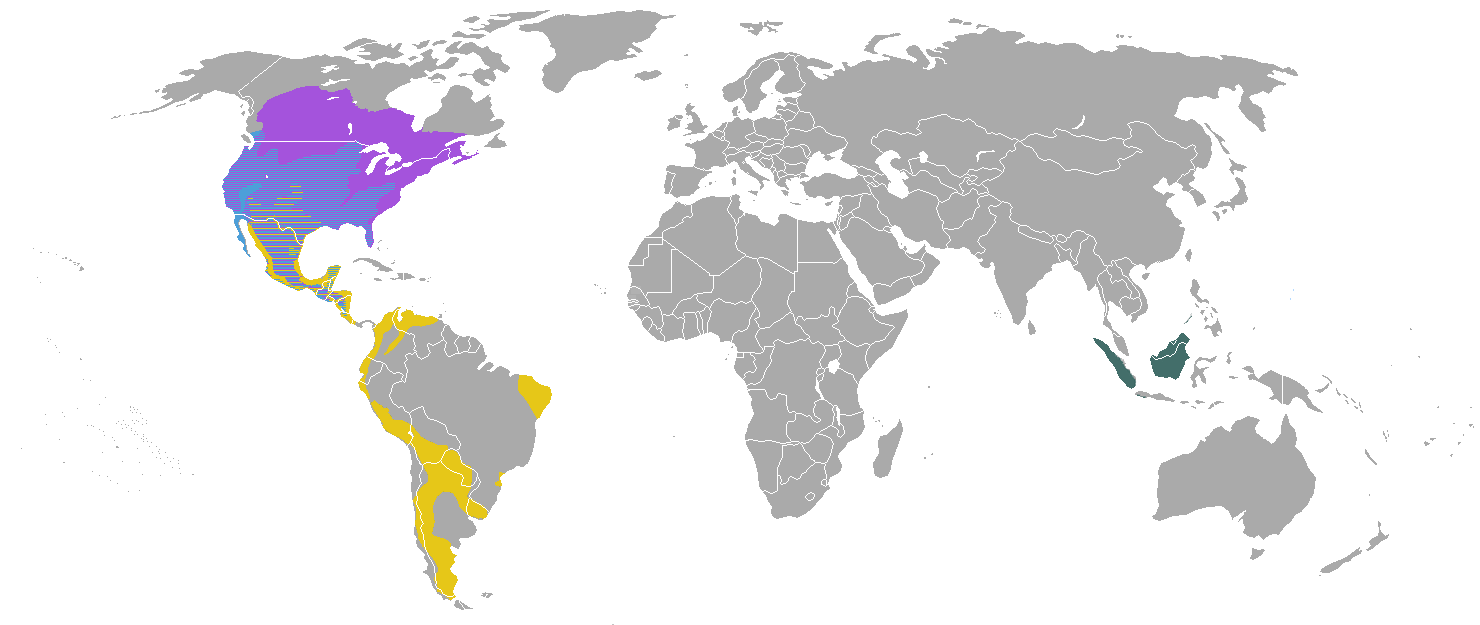
Mephitidae distribution. Conepatus in yellow, Mephitis in purple, Mydaus in green, Spilogale in blue

The family Mephitidae consists of twelve extant species belonging to four genera and divided into dozens of subspecies. It is not divided into subfamilies. This does not include hybrid species or extinct prehistoric species.

- Genus Conepatus (hog-nosed skunks): four species
- Genus Mephitis (skunks): two species
- Genus Mydaus: (stink badgers): two species
- Genus Spilogale: (spotted skunks): four species

== Mephitids ==
The following classification is based on the taxonomy described by Mammal Species of the World (2005), with augmentation by generally accepted proposals made since using molecular phylogenetic analysis.

Genus Conepatus – Gray, 1837 – four species
Common name	Scientific name and subspecies	Range	Size and ecology	IUCN status and estimated population
American hog-nosed skunk	C. leuconotus (Lichtenstein, 1832) Three subspecies: C. l. figginsi (Eastern hog-nosed skunk); C. l. leuconotus (Furnace Canyon hog-nosed skunk); C. l. telmalestes (Big Thicket hog-nosed skunk)†	Southern North America and northern Central America	Size: 34–51 cm (13–20 in) long, plus 12–41 cm (5–16 in) tail Habitat: Rocky areas, forest, grassland, and desert Diet: Primarily eats insects, as well as fruit and small vertebrates	LC Unknown
Humboldt's hog-nosed skunk	C. humboldtii Gray, 1837 Three subspecies: C. h. castaneus; C. h. humboldtii; C. h. proteus	Southern tip of South America	Size: 32–45 cm (13–18 in) long, plus 15–18 cm (6–7 in) tail Habitat: Shrubland, grassland, savanna, and rocky areas Diet: Primarily eats insects, as well as small mammals, shrubs, and fruit	LC Unknown
Molina's hog-nosed skunk	C. chinga (Molina, 1792) Seven subspecies: C. c. budini; C. c. chinga; C. c. gibsoni; C. c. inca; C. c. mendosus; C. c. rex; C. c. suffocans	Southern South America	Size: 20–49 cm (8–19 in) long, plus 13–29 cm (5–11 in) tail Habitat: Grassland, shrubland, and savanna Diet: Omnivorous; primarily eats invertebrates, rodents, small reptiles, and eggs	LC Unknown
Striped hog-nosed skunk	C. semistriatus (Boddaert, 1785) Six subspecies: C. s. amazonicus; C. s. semistriatus; C. s. taxinus; C. s. trichurus; C. s. yucatanicus; C. s. zorrino	Northern and eastern South America and Central America	Size: 33–50 cm (13–20 in) long, plus 13–31 cm (5–12 in) tail Habitat: Grassland, shrubland, and forest Diet: Primarily eats insects, lizards, and birds	LC Unknown

Genus Mephitis – Geoffroy, 1795 – two species
Common name	Scientific name and subspecies	Range	Size and ecology	IUCN status and estimated population
Hooded skunk	M. macroura Lichtenstein, 1832 Four subspecies: M. m. eximius; M. m. macroura; M. m. milleri; M. m. richardsoni	Mexico and Central America	Size: 19–30 cm (7–12 in) long, plus 35–40 cm (14–16 in) tail Habitat: Desert, shrubland, rocky areas, grassland, and forest Diet: Primarily eats insects, fruit, small vertebrates, and bird eggs	LC Unknown
Striped skunk	M. mephitis (Schreber, 1776) Thirteen subspecies: M. m. avia (Illinois skunk); M. m. elongata (Florida skunk); M. m. estor (Arizona skunk); M. m. holzneri (Southern California skunk); M. m. hudsonica (Northern plains skunk); M. m. major (Great Basin skunk); M. m. mephitis (Canada skunk); M. m. mesomelas (Louisiana skunk); M. m. nigra (Eastern skunk); M. m. notata (Cascade Mountains skunk); M. m. occidentalis (California skunk); M. m. spissigrada (Puget Sound skunk); M. m. varians (Texas long-tailed skunk)	North America	Size: 46–82 cm (18–32 in) long, plus 17–40 cm (7–16 in) tail Habitat: Shrubland, savanna, forest, and grassland Diet: Primarily eats insects, as well as small mammals, birds, and vegetation	LC Unknown

Genus Mydaus – F. Cuvier, 1821 – two species
Common name	Scientific name and subspecies	Range	Size and ecology	IUCN status and estimated population
Palawan stink badger	M. marchei Huet, 1887	Western Philippines	Size: 32–49 cm (13–19 in) long, plus 1–5 cm (0–2 in) tail Habitat: Forest, shrubland, and introduced vegetation Diet: Primarily eats worms and arthropods	LC Unknown
Sunda stink badger	M. javanensis (Desmarest, 1820) Three subspecies: M. j. javanensis (Sunda stink badger); M. j. lucifer (Bornean stink badger); M. j. ollula (Natuna Islands stink badger)	Indonesia and Malaysia	Size: 37–51 cm (15–20 in) long, plus 5–8 cm (2–3 in) tail Habitat: Grassland, forest, and shrubland Diet: Primarily eats birds' eggs, carrion, insects, worms, and plants	LC Unknown

Genus Spilogale – Gray, 1865 – four species
Common name	Scientific name and subspecies	Range	Size and ecology	IUCN status and estimated population
Eastern spotted skunk	S. putorius (Linnaeus, 1758) Three subspecies: S. p. ambarvalis; S. p. interrupta; S. p. putorius	Eastern United States	Size: 11–35 cm (4–14 in) long, plus 7–22 cm (3–9 in) tail Habitat: Forest, rocky areas, shrubland, and grassland Diet: Omnivorous; primarily eats insects, as well as small mammals and birds	VU Unknown
Pygmy spotted skunk	S. pygmaea Thomas, 1897 Three subspecies: S. p. australis; S. p. intermedia; S. p. pygmaea	West coast of Mexico	Size: 11–35 cm (4–14 in) long, plus 7–12 cm (3–5 in) tail Habitat: Shrubland, marine coastal/supratidal, and forest Diet: Primarily eats insects, spiders, birds, eggs, small mammals, fruit, and seeds	VU Unknown
Southern spotted skunk	S. angustifrons Howell, 1902 Five subspecies: S. a. angustifrons; S. a. celeris; S. a. elata; S. a. tropicalis; S. a. yucatanensis	Mexico and Central America	Size: 20–25 cm (8–10 in) long, plus 10–15 cm (4–6 in) tail Habitat: Forest and rocky areas Diet: Omnivorous; primarily eats insects, small mammals, fruit, grain, birds, and bird eggs	LC Unknown
Western spotted skunk	S. gracilis Merriam, 1890 Seven subspecies: S. g. amphialus (Island spotted skunk); S. g. gracilis; S. g. latifrons; S. g. leucoparia; S. g. lucasana; S. g. martirensis; S. g. phenax	Western North America	Size: 24–37 cm (9–15 in) long, plus 8–21 cm (3–8 in) tail Habitat: Inland wetlands, grassland, shrubland, rocky areas, savanna, and forest Diet: Primarily eats insects, small mammals, carrion, berries, and fruit	LC Unknown
