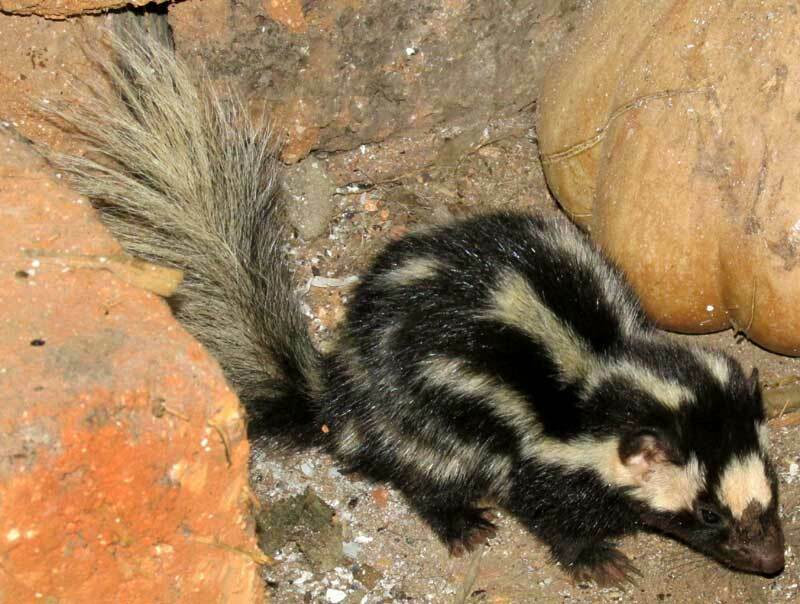

Scientific classification
- Kingdom: Animalia
- Phylum: Chordata
- Class: Mammalia
- Order: Carnivora
- Family: Mephitidae
- Genus: Spilogale
- Species: S. yucatanensis

Binomial name
- Spilogale yucatanensis Burt, 1938

Synonyms
- Spilogale angustifrons yucatanensis Burt, 1938

= Spilogale yucatanensis =

Yucatan spotted skunk

Species of skunk

Spilogale yucatanensis, the Yucatan spotted skunk, is a species of skunk native to the Yucatán Peninsula, it was originally classified as a subspecies of Southern spotted skunk, but is now elevated into a full species.

== Description ==
Species of Spilogale are relatively small, black skunks variously patterned with white stripes and blotches. Males in the genus are much larger than the females and have considerably longer tails.

In the study suggesting that Spilogale yucatanensis should be considered an independent species, not just a subspecies of Spilogale angustifrons, the authors write that it differs from the southern spotted skunk, S. angustifrons, by its smaller size and smaller, more closely spaced teeth; and from the pygmy spotted skunk, Spilogale pygmaea, occurring on the Pacific coast of Mexico, by its different color pattern, with black instead of white legs, a larger, triangular skull, and a larger Mastoid part of the temporal bone.

== Behavior ==
In A.S. Leopold's 1959 classic Wildlife of Mexico: the game birds and mammals it's written that "They've told me that in the Yucatan {they} attack without provocation, and that the most violent attacks take place when the male is looking for a female." At the iNaturalist website, a public domain observation of Spilogale yucatanensis is accompanied by this comment: "This creature wandered around inside the hut ignoring my taking pictures with a flash, even chewed on my pajama leg as I photographed, and when I tried to chase him off he wouldn't go. When I went to bed he tried to come in under my mosquito net. Finally, I tried to scare him away with the flashlight, but he bit into the face cap and hung on as I lifted him and deposited him into a wide-mouth gallon jar, in which I carried him deep into the forest and left him. Interestingly, neither in this encounter nor an earlier one documented by the same observer did the skunk spray his musk or even smell musky, though in each case it was extremely aggressive.

== Range ==
Spilogale yucatanensis is native just to Mexico's Yucatan Peninsula.

== Habitat ==
The Yucatan Peninsula's main vegetation type is deciduous and semi-deciduous tropical forests. In general the forests grow highest in the southern part.

== Evolutionary history ==
By 1.5 million years ago, the common ancestor of today's spotted skunk species had spread into most of the distribution area today occupied by Spilogale species. Spilogale yucatanensis arose from its most recent ancestral species around 660,000 years ago, when it separated from the common ancestor of S. interrupta and S. putorius.

Thus, the Yucatan Spotted Skunk species arose when the Yucatan Peninsula was experiencing the Middle Pleistocene geological age. Excavations in Loltún Cave in central Yucatan have found fossils and bones of mastodons, whose last recorded occurrence in the Americas was about 11,000 years ago, well after our skunk came into being. These and other animal finds in the cave suggest an early paleoenvironment for Spilogale yucatanensis composed of a vegetation mosaic different of the current one, with three main habitat types: evergreen seasonal forest, tropical deciduous forest, and scrub forest.

== Taxonomy ==
The Yucatán spotted skunk was scientifically described in 1938 by zoologist William Henry Burt of the USA. Burt regarded the species as a subspecies of the Southern Spotted Skunk, Spilogale angustifrons. The specimen from which the species was named, the holotype, consists of the fur and skull of an adult female collected at Chichén Itzá, Yucatán, on March 2, 1936, by M. B. Trautman.

As part of a phylogenetic study, a taxonomic revision of the genus Spilogale was published in 2021, in which it was found that the Eastern Spotted Skunk (Spilogale putorius) and the Plains Spotted Skunk (S. interrupta), native to the eastern and central United States, respectively, are the Yucatán Spotted Skunk's closest relatives, while the Southern Spotted Skunk (Spilogale angustifrons) is most closely related to the Desert Spotted Skunk (S. leucoparia) of the southern United States and northern Mexico. The Yucatan Spotted Skunk was thus granted status as an independent species.

== Etymology ==
The genus name Spilogale comes from the Greek word spilo, meaning "spotted", and gale, which means "weasel".

== Gallery ==
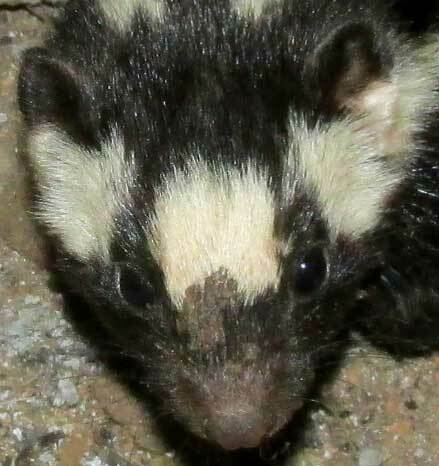
Yucatán Spotted Skunk, Spilogale yucatanensis, portrait

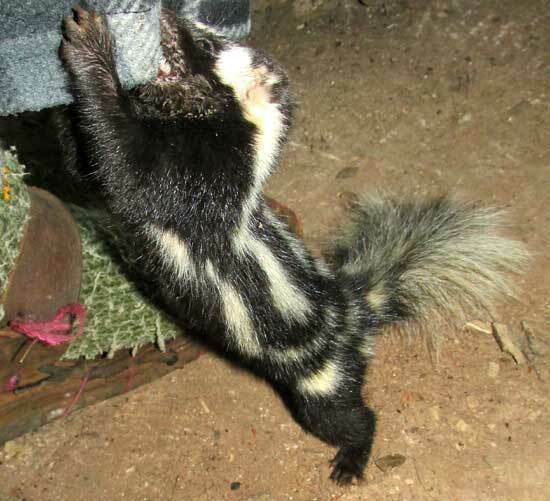
Yucatán Spotted Skunk, Spilogale yucatanensis, biting an observer's pajama leg

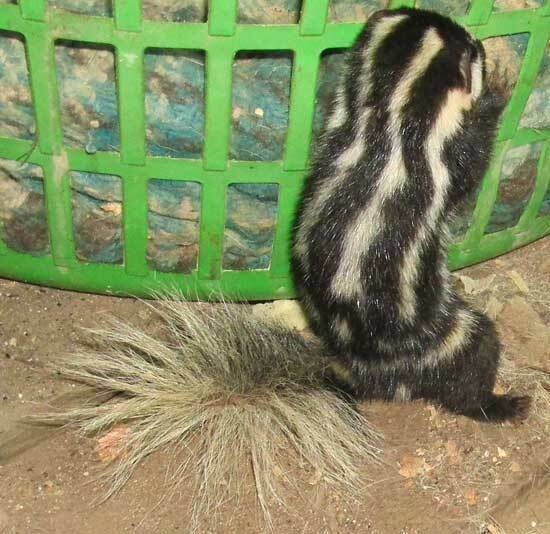
Yucatán Spotted Skunk, Spilogale yucatanensis, sniffing dog bed
