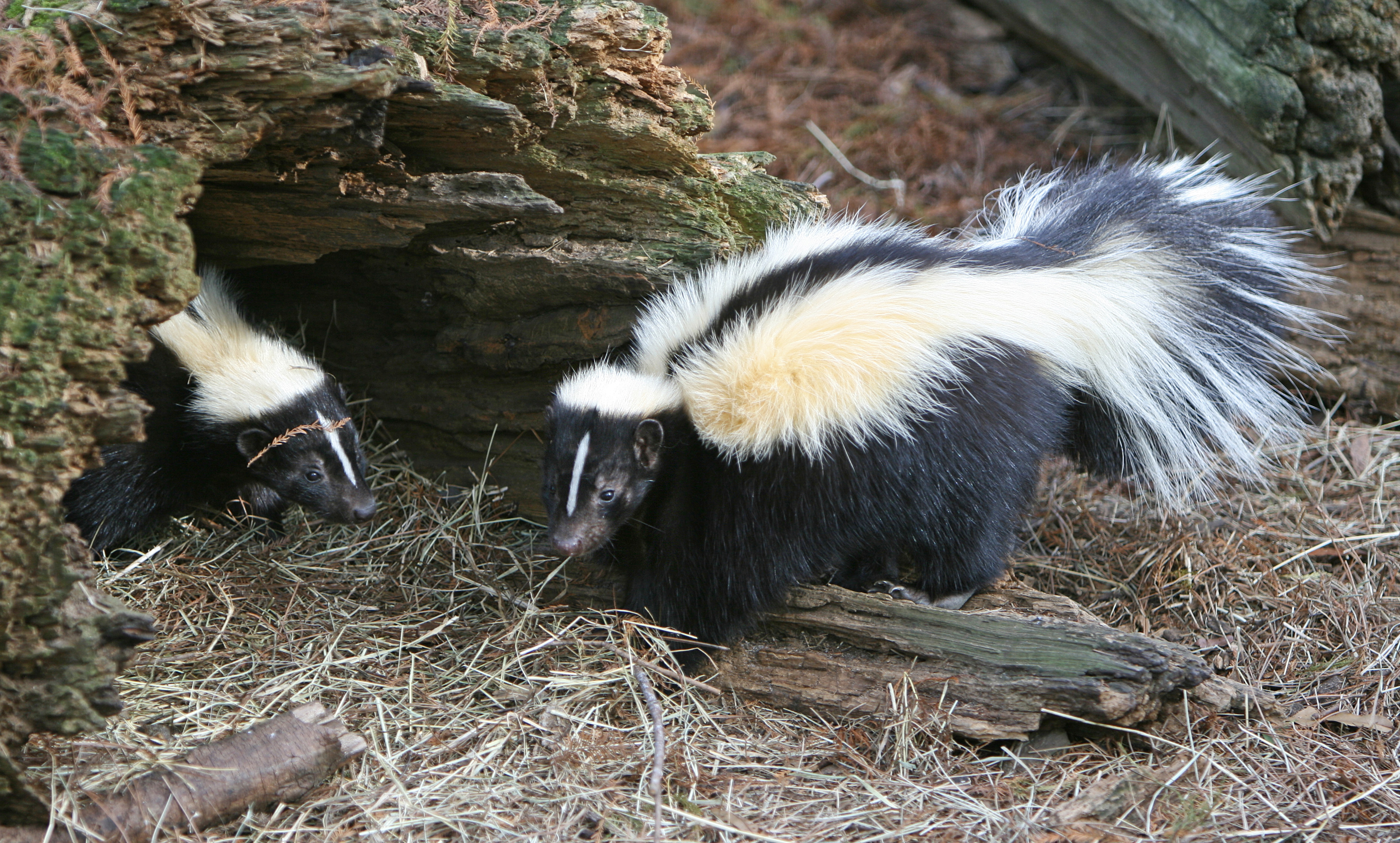
- Striped skunks

Scientific classification
- Kingdom: Animalia
- Phylum: Chordata
- Class: Mammalia
- Order: Carnivora
- Superfamily: Musteloidea
- Family: Mephitidae

Groups included
- Conepatus; Mephitis; Spilogale †Brachyprotoma
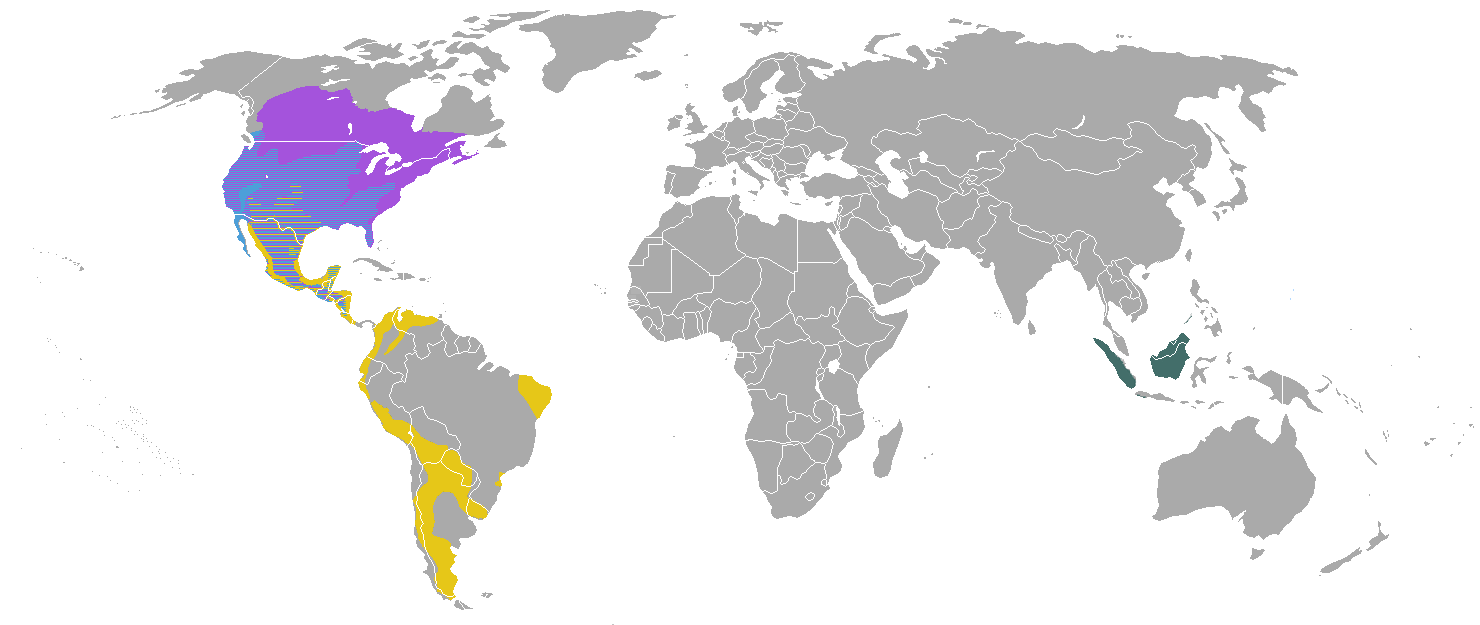
- Skunk genera ranges

Cladistically included but traditionally excluded taxa
- Mydaus †Palaeomephitis †Promephitis

= Skunk =

Skunks

Common name of mammals

Skunks are New World mammals in the family Mephitidae. They are known for their ability to spray a liquid with a strong, unpleasant scent from their anal glands. Different species of skunk vary in appearance from black-and-white to brown, cream or ginger colored, but all have warning coloration.

While related to polecats and other members of the weasel family, skunks have as their closest relatives the Old World stink badgers.

== Etymology ==
The word skunk is dated from the 1630s, adapted from a southern New England Algonquian language word squunck, from Proto-Algonquian *šeka:kwa, from *šek- 'to urinate' + *-a:kw 'fox'. Skunk has historic use as an insult, attested from 1841.

In 1634, a skunk was described in The Jesuit Relations:

The other is a low animal, about the size of a little dog or cat. I mention it here, not on account of its excellence, but to make of it a symbol of sin. I have seen three or four of them. It has black fur, quite beautiful and shining; and has upon its back two perfectly white stripes, which join near the neck and tail, making an oval that adds greatly to their grace. The tail is bushy and well furnished with hair, like the tail of a Fox; it carries it curled back like that of a Squirrel. It is more white than black; and, at the first glance, you would say, especially when it walks, that it ought to be called Jupiter's little dog. But it is so stinking and casts so foul an odor, that it is unworthy of being called the dog of Pluto. No sewer ever smelled so bad. I would not have believed it if I had not smelled it myself. Your heart almost fails you when you approach the animal; two have been killed in our court, and several days afterward there was such a dreadful odor throughout our house that we could not endure it. I believe the sin smelled by Saint Catherine de Sienne must have had the same vile odor. (Note: French: L'autre est vn animal basset, de la grandeur des petits chiens, ou d'vn chat ; ie luy donne place icy, non pour son excellence, mais pour en faire vn symbole du peché ; i'en ay veu trois ou quatre. Il est d'vn poil noir assez beau et luisant, il porte sur son dos deux rayes toutes blanches, qui se ioignans vers le col et croche de la queuë, font une ouale qui luy donne tres belle grace ; la queuë est touffuë et bien fournie de poil, comme la queuë d'vn Regnard, il la porte retroussée, comme vn Escurieux, elle est plus blanche que noire : vous diriez à l'œil notamment quand il marche, qu'il meriteroit estre nommé le petit chien de Iupiter ; mais il est si puant, et iette vne odeur si empestée, qu'il est indigne d'estre appellé le chien de Pluton, il n'y a voirie si infecte ; ie ne l'aurois pas creu si ie ne l'auois senty moy mesme, le cœur vous manque quasi quand vous en approchez. On en a tué deux dans nostre court ; plusieurs iours apres il sentoit si mal par tout nostre maison, qu'on n'en pouuoit supporter l'odeur. Ie croy que le peché que sentit saincte Catherine de Sienne, deuoit estre de mesme puanteur.)

In Southern United States dialect, the term polecat is sometimes used as a colloquial nickname for a skunk, even though polecats are only distantly related to skunks.

== Taxonomy ==
In alphabetical order, the living species of skunks are:

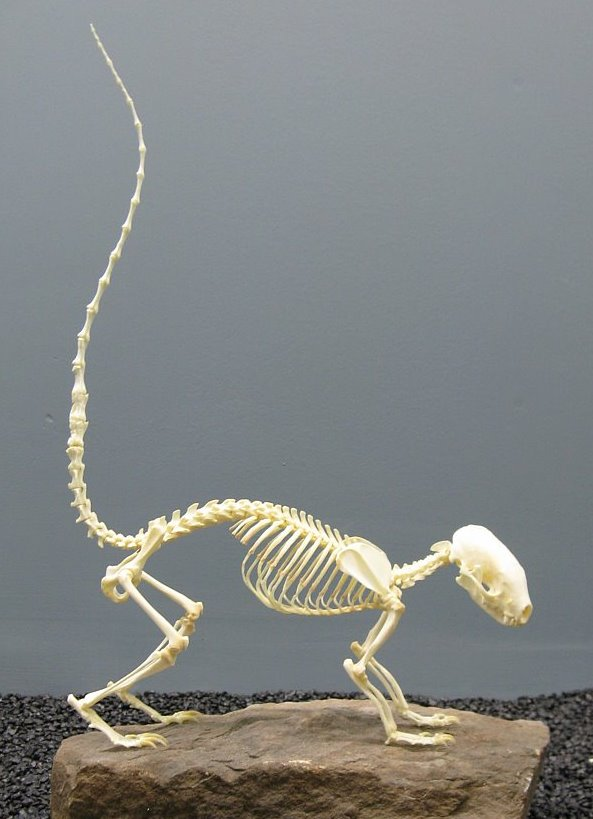
A hooded skunk skeleton on display at the Museum of Osteology

- Family Mephitidae
  - Genus: Conepatus
    - Conepatus chinga – Molina's hog-nosed skunk
    - Conepatus humboldtii – Humboldt's hog-nosed skunk
    - Conepatus leuconotus – American hog-nosed skunk
    - Conepatus semistriatus – striped hog-nosed skunk
  - Genus: Mephitis
    - Mephitis macroura – hooded skunk
    - Mephitis mephitis – striped skunk
  - Genus: Spilogale
    - Spilogale angustifrons – southern spotted skunk
    - Spilogale gracilis – western spotted skunk
    - Spilogale putorius – eastern spotted skunk
    - Spilogale pygmaea – pygmy spotted skunk

== Description ==
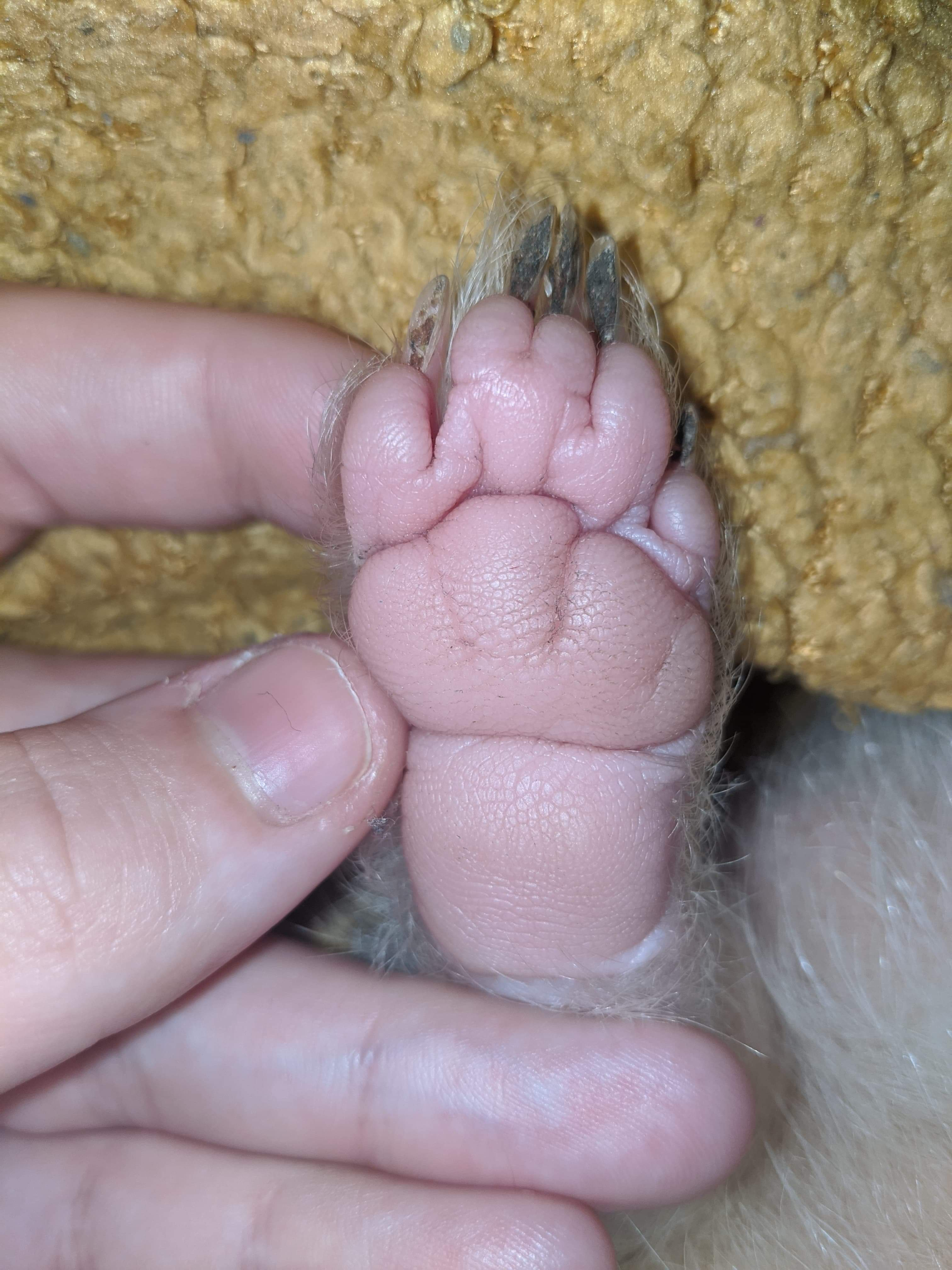
Back left foot of an albino skunk

Skunk species vary in size from about 14 to 37 in (36 to 94 cm) long and in weight from less than 1 lb (0.45 kg) (spotted skunks) to 14 lb (6.4 kg) (hog-nosed skunks). They have moderately elongated bodies, short, muscular legs and five toes on each foot. Skunks have relatively large feet and long claws adapted for digging.

Although the most common fur color is black and white, some skunks are brown or grey. All skunks are striped, even from birth. They may have a single thick stripe across the back and tail, two thinner stripes, or—in the case of the spotted skunk—a series of white spots and short, broken stripes.

== Distribution ==
Skunks are found primarily in the Western Hemisphere. Striped skunks are native to North America, from southern Canada to northern Mexico. Spotted skunks occur from southern Canada to Costa Rica. Hog-nosed skunks live in both North and South America.

== Behavior ==
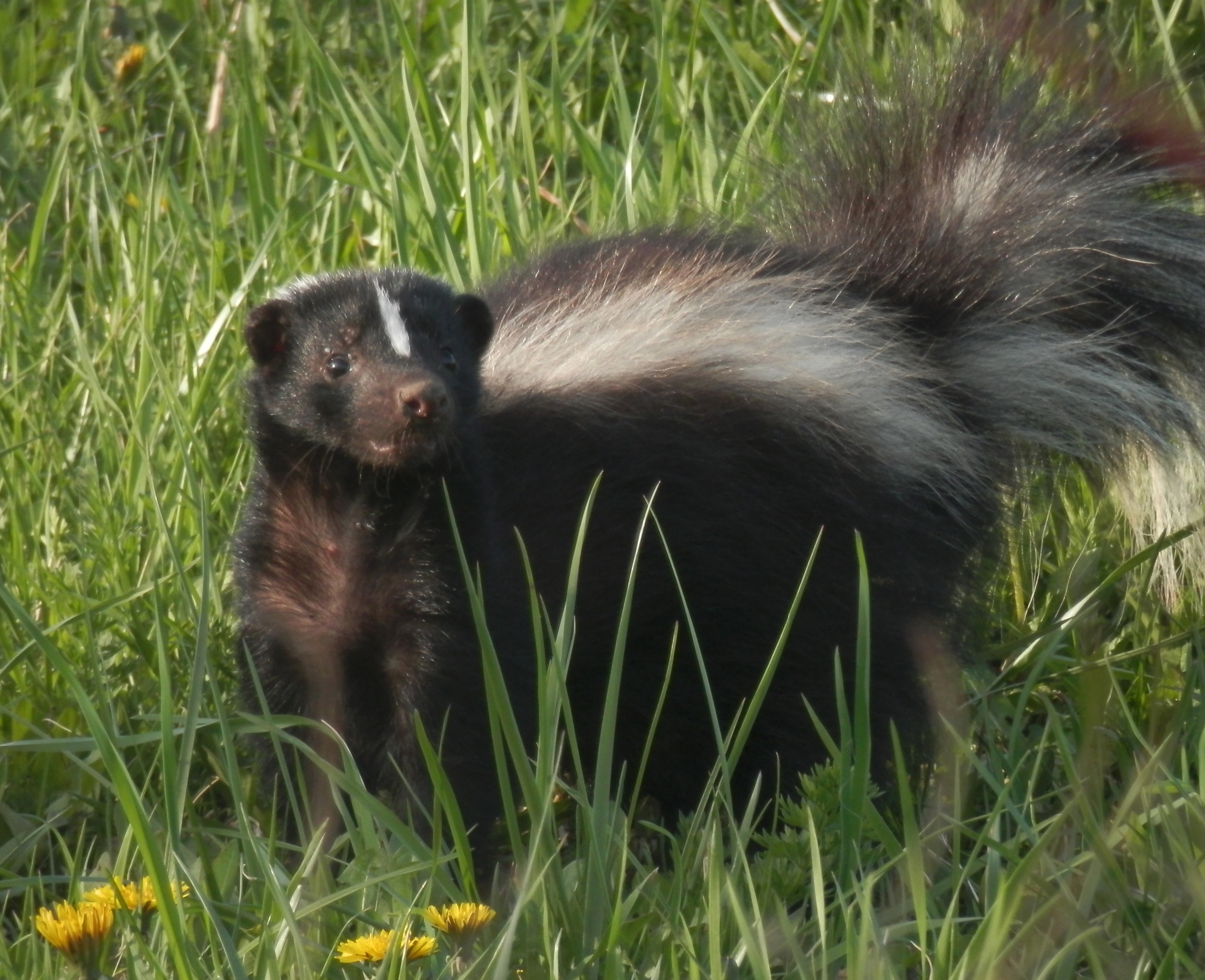
A skunk in Ontario, Canada

Skunks are crepuscular and solitary animals when not breeding, though in the colder parts of their range, they may gather in communal dens for warmth. During the day they shelter in burrows, which they can dig with their powerful front claws. For most of the year the normal home range for skunks is 0.5 to 2 miles (1 to 3 km) in diameter, with males expanding during breeding season to travel 4 to 5 miles (6 to 8 km) per night.

Skunks are not true hibernators in the winter, but do den up for extended periods of time. However, they remain generally inactive and feed rarely, going through a dormant stage. Over winter, multiple females (as many as 12) huddle together; males often den alone. Often, the same winter den is repeatedly used.

Although they have excellent senses of smell and hearing, they have poor vision, being unable to see objects more than about 3 m (10 ft) away, making them vulnerable to death by road traffic. They are short-lived; their lifespan in the wild can reach seven years, with an average of six years. In captivity, they may live for up to 10 years.

=== Reproduction ===
Female skunk with young

Young skunk foraging in a backyard

Skunks mate in early spring and are polygynous (that is, successful males are uninhibited from mating with additional females).

Female skunks generally give birth once per year (typically in May or early June). Skunks are placental, with a gestation period of about 66 days. Litters usually consist of four to six kits.

Skunk kits are born blind and helpless, with their eyes opening approximately three weeks after birth. Weaning occurs after about two months. At about 6-8 weeks, the kits begin to accompany their mother outside of the den to hunt and forage for food. They generally stay with their mother until they are ready to mate, roughly at one year of age.

The mother is protective of her kits, spraying at any sign of danger. The male plays no part in raising the young.

=== Diet ===
Skunks are omnivorous, eating both plant and animal material and changing their diets as the seasons change. In the spring and summer, their diet consists largely of bugs, including beetles, grasshoppers, crickets, bees and other arthropods. During the winter, they consume a more carnivorous diet consisting of small rodents, amphibians, reptiles, fish, and the eggs of ground-nesting birds. They also commonly eat wild fruits, nuts, and corn.

In settled areas, skunks also seek out garbage and pet food left outside by humans. Skunks also may act as scavengers, eating carrion left by other animals. Skunks commonly dig holes in lawns in search of grubs and worms.

Skunks use their long claws to break apart rotting logs to find insects that live within them. They also use those claws to help dig for insects, which leaves behind pits, which are easy signs of foraging. The claws also help with pinning down live and active prey.

Skunks are one of the primary predators of the honeybee, relying on their thick fur to protect them from stings. The skunk scratches at the front of the beehive and eats the guard bees that come out to investigate. Mother skunks are known to teach this behavior to their young.

=== Spray ===
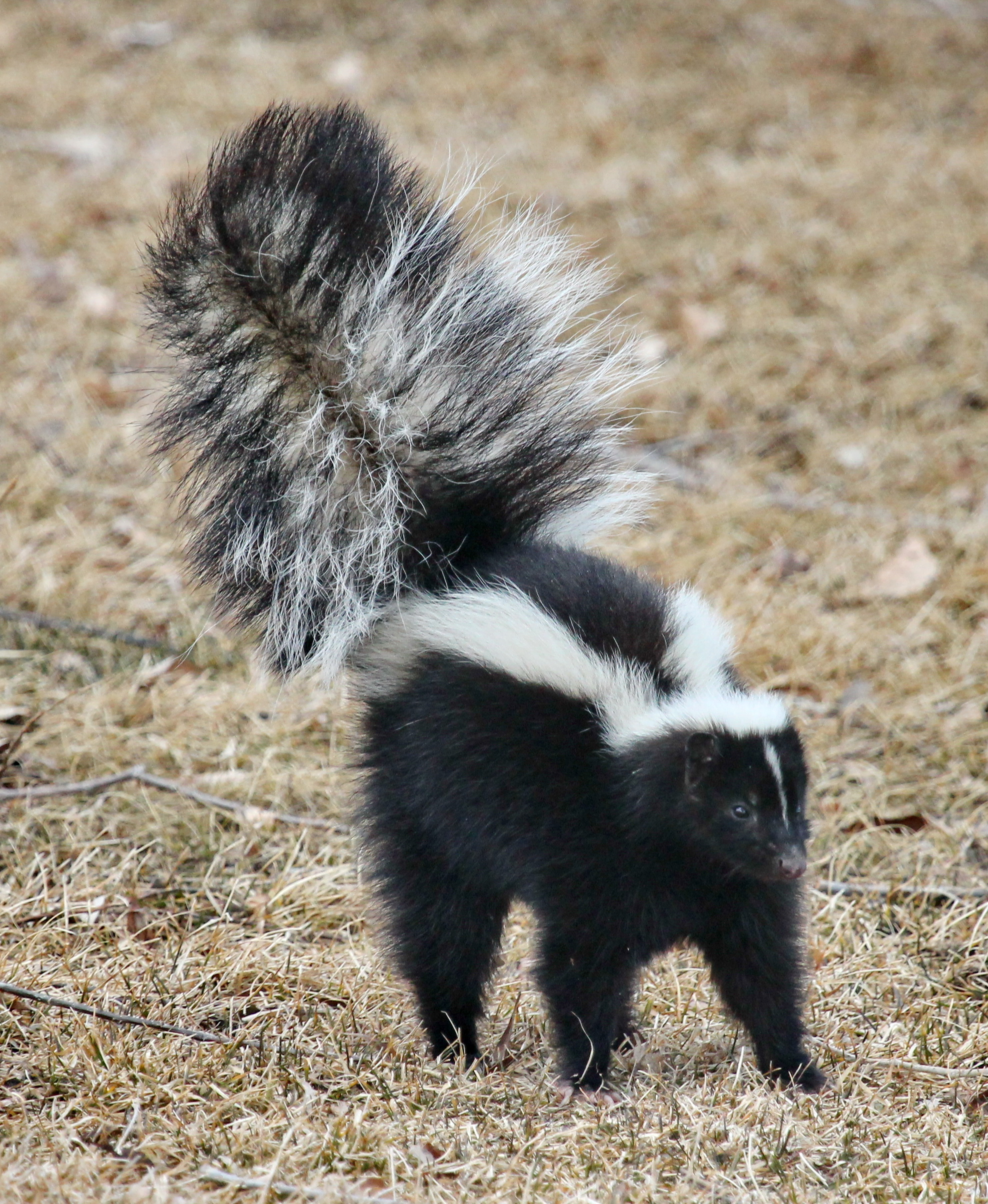
Striped skunk (Mephitis mephitis) in a defensive posture with erect and puffed tail, indicating its readiness to spray

Chemical structure of E-2-butenethiol, a major component of skunk spray.

Skunks are notorious for their use of stench compounds as defensive weapon. The spray consists of a mixture of organosulfur compounds that have an offensive odor. A skunk's spray is powerful enough to ward off bears and other potential attackers. Muscles located next to the scent glands allow them to spray with a high degree of accuracy, as far as 3 m (10 ft). The spray can also cause irritation and even temporary blindness, and is sufficiently powerful to be detected by a human nose up to 5.6 km (3.5 miles) downwind. Their chemical defense is effective, as illustrated by this extract from Charles Darwin's 1839 book The Voyage of the Beagle:

We saw also a couple of Zorrillos, or skunks—odious animals, which are far from uncommon. In general appearance, the Zorrillo resembles a polecat, but it is rather larger and much thicker in proportion. Conscious of its power, it roams by day about the open plain and fears neither dog nor man. If a dog is urged to the attack, its courage is instantly checked by a few drops of the fetid oil, which brings on violent sickness and running at the nose. Whatever is once polluted by it, is forever useless. Azara says the smell can be perceived at a league distance; more than once, when entering the harbour of Monte Video, the wind being offshore, we have perceived the odour onboard the Beagle. Certain it is, that every animal most willingly makes room for the Zorrillo.

Skunks carry just enough for five or six successive sprays – about 15 cm^{3} – and require up to ten days to produce another supply. Their bold black and white coloration makes their appearance memorable. It is to a skunk's advantage to warn possible predators off without expending scent: black and white aposematic warning coloration aside, threatened skunks will go through an elaborate routine of hisses, foot-stamping, and tail-high deimatic or threat postures before resorting to spraying. Skunks usually do not spray other skunks, except among males in the mating season. If they fight over den space in autumn, they do so with teeth and claws.

Most predators of the Americas, such as wolves, foxes, and badgers, seldom attack skunks, presumably out of fear of being sprayed. The exceptions are reckless predators whose attacks fail once they are sprayed, dogs, and the great horned owl, which is the skunk's only regular predator. In one case, the remains of 57 striped skunks were found in a single great horned owl nest.

==== Mitigation ====
Skunks are common in suburban areas, and domestic dogs are often sprayed by skunks. There are many misconceptions about the removal of skunk odor, including the pervasive idea that tomato juice will neutralize the odor. These household remedies are ineffective, and only appear to work due to olfactory fatigue. In 1993, the American chemist Paul Krebaum developed a formula that chemically neutralizes skunk spray by changing the odor-causing thiols into odorless acids, which is endorsed by the Humane Society of the United States for sprayed dogs. It involves hydrogen peroxide, baking soda, and liquid dish soap.

Skunk spray is composed mainly of three low-molecular-weight thiol compounds, (E)-2-butene-1-thiol, 3-methyl-1-butanethiol, and 2-quinolinemethanethiol, as well as acetate thioesters of these. These compounds are detectable by the human nose at concentrations of only 11.3 parts per billion.

== Relations with humans ==
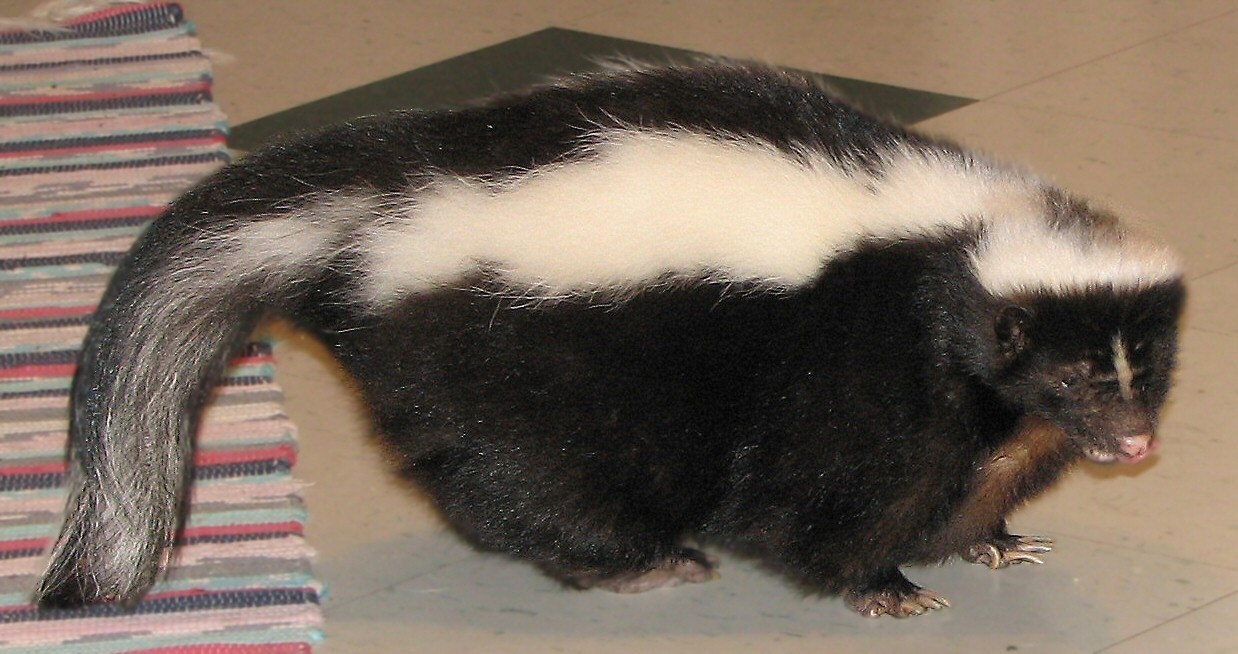
A tame striped skunk

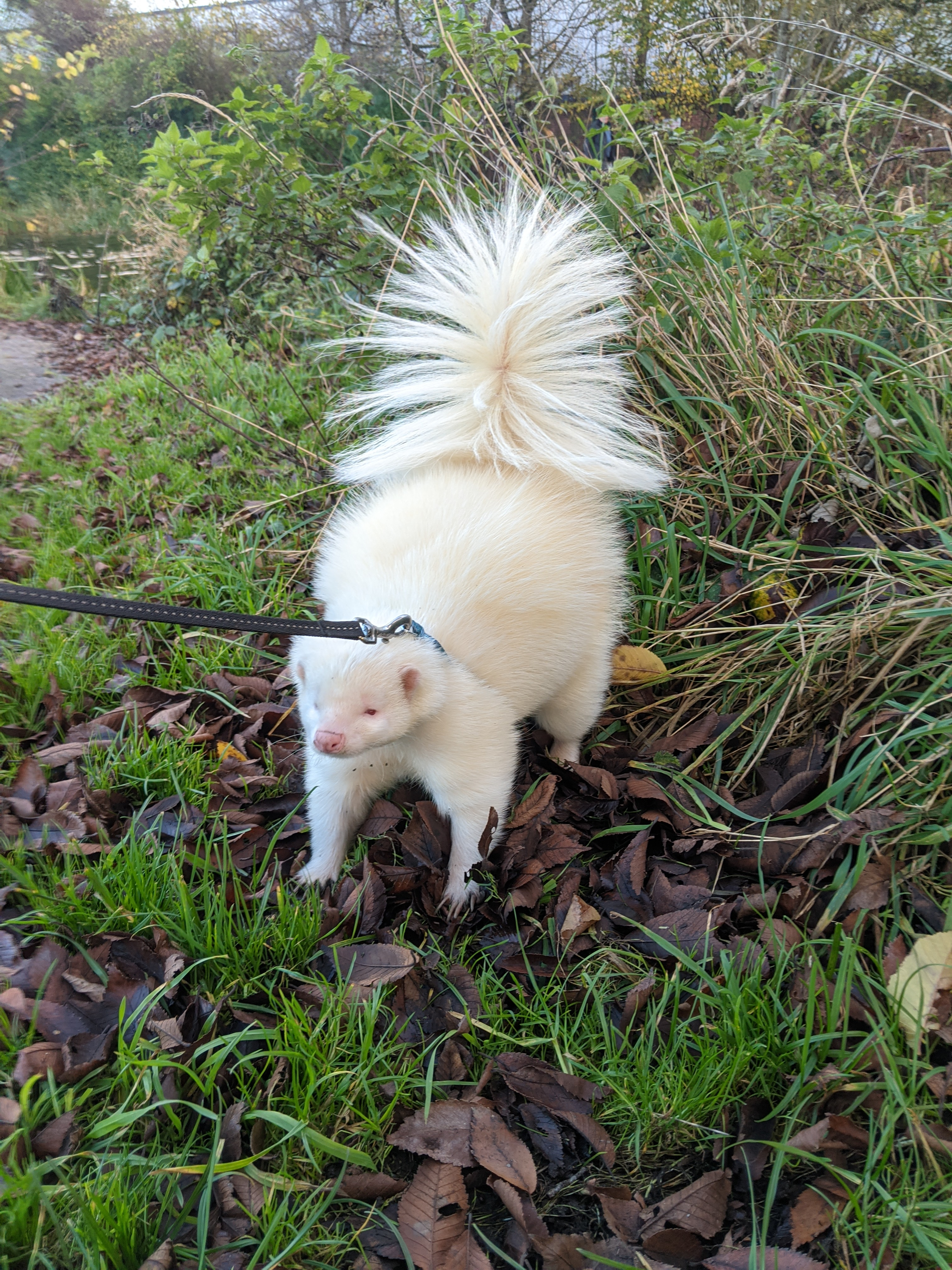
A pet albino skunk on a walk

=== Fur trade ===
During the 19th and 20th centuries in the United States, fur farms raised skunks for their pelts, which were sold to the garment industry to make coats, hats, and other articles of clothing. Prior to the passage of the Fur Products Labeling Act in 1951, skunk fur was often sold under ambiguous names such as "American sable" and "Alaskan sable."

=== Bites ===
It is rare for a healthy skunk to bite a human, though a tame skunk whose scent glands have been removed (usually on behalf of those who will keep it as a pet) may defend itself by biting. There are, however, a few recorded incidents of skunks biting humans. Skunk bites in humans can result in infection with the rabies virus. The Centers for Disease Control (CDC) recorded 1,494 cases of rabies in skunks in the United States for the year 2006—about 21.5% of reported cases in all species. Skunks in fact are less prominent than raccoons as vectors of rabies. (However, this varies regionally in the United States, with raccoons dominating along the Atlantic coast and the eastern Gulf of Mexico, while skunks instead predominate throughout the Midwest, including the western Gulf, and in California.)

=== As pets ===
Mephitis mephitis, the striped skunk, is the most social skunk and the one most commonly kept as a pet. In the US, skunks can legally be kept as pets in 17 states. When a skunk is kept as a pet, its scent glands are often surgically removed. In the UK, skunks can be kept as pets, but the Animal Welfare Act 2006 made it illegal to remove their scent glands.

Although skunks have playful temperaments and can be highly sociable when raised in captivity, pet skunks may also engage in destructive behaviors such as digging at carpeting, climbing furniture and stealing objects.

== See also ==
- List of fictional musteloids
- Skunk oil
