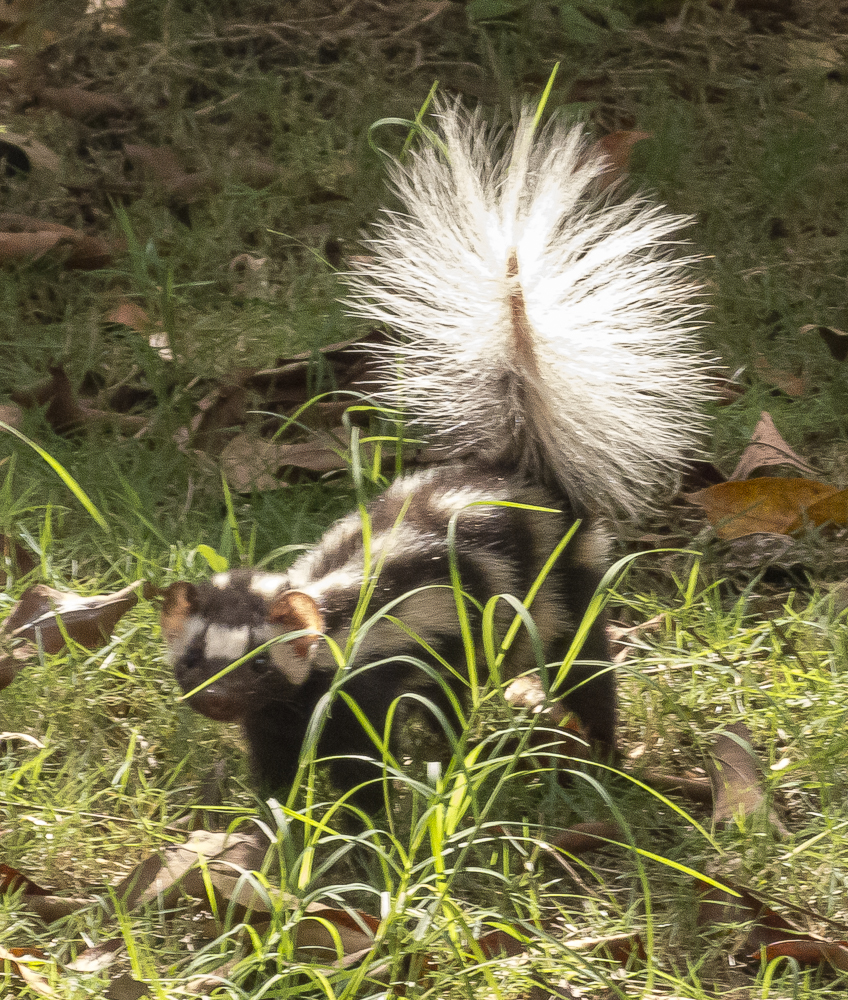
- In Yucatán, Mexico

Conservation status
- Least Concern (IUCN 3.1)

Scientific classification
- Kingdom: Animalia
- Phylum: Chordata
- Class: Mammalia
- Order: Carnivora
- Family: Mephitidae
- Genus: Spilogale
- Species: S. angustifrons

Binomial name
- Spilogale angustifrons Howell, 1902
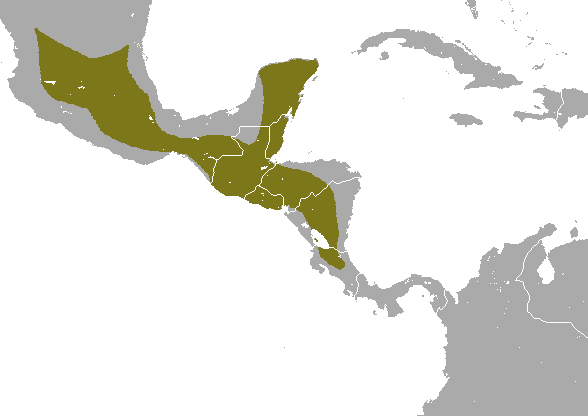
- Southern spotted skunk range

= Southern spotted skunk =

Species of carnivore

The southern spotted skunk (Spilogale angustifrons) is a species of mammal in the skunk family, Mephitidae. It ranges from Costa Rica to southern Mexico. At one time this skunk was considered to be a subspecies of the eastern spotted skunk (Spilogale putorius).

== Description ==
The southern spotted skunk grows to a length of 34 cm (13 in) with a tail length of 23 cm (9.1 in) and weighs between 0.5 and 1 kilogram (1.1 and 2.2 lb). It is conspicuously coloured in black and white and resembles the western spotted skunk in appearance. It has anal glands beneath the tail which secrete musk which can be sprayed with considerable accuracy at a predator.

== Distribution and habitat ==
The southern spotted skunk is native to Central America where its range includes Mexico, Guatemala, Honduras, El Salvador, Nicaragua, Costa Rica and Belize. It is present at altitudes of up to 300 metres (980 ft) in dry rocky areas with scrub and open woodland, and also in agricultural areas.

== Behaviours ==
The southern spotted skunk is nocturnal and secretive in its habits. It climbs trees but mainly searches for food on the ground for the small mammals, insects, birds, eggs, grain and fruit on which it feeds.

== Status ==
The chief threats faced by the southern spotted skunk are human activities such as road construction, wildfires and agricultural monoculture. Though not very common, it has a large range and is presumed to have a large total population, and it is able to adapt to disturbance to its habitat. For these reasons, the International Union for Conservation of Nature has assessed it as being of "least concern".
