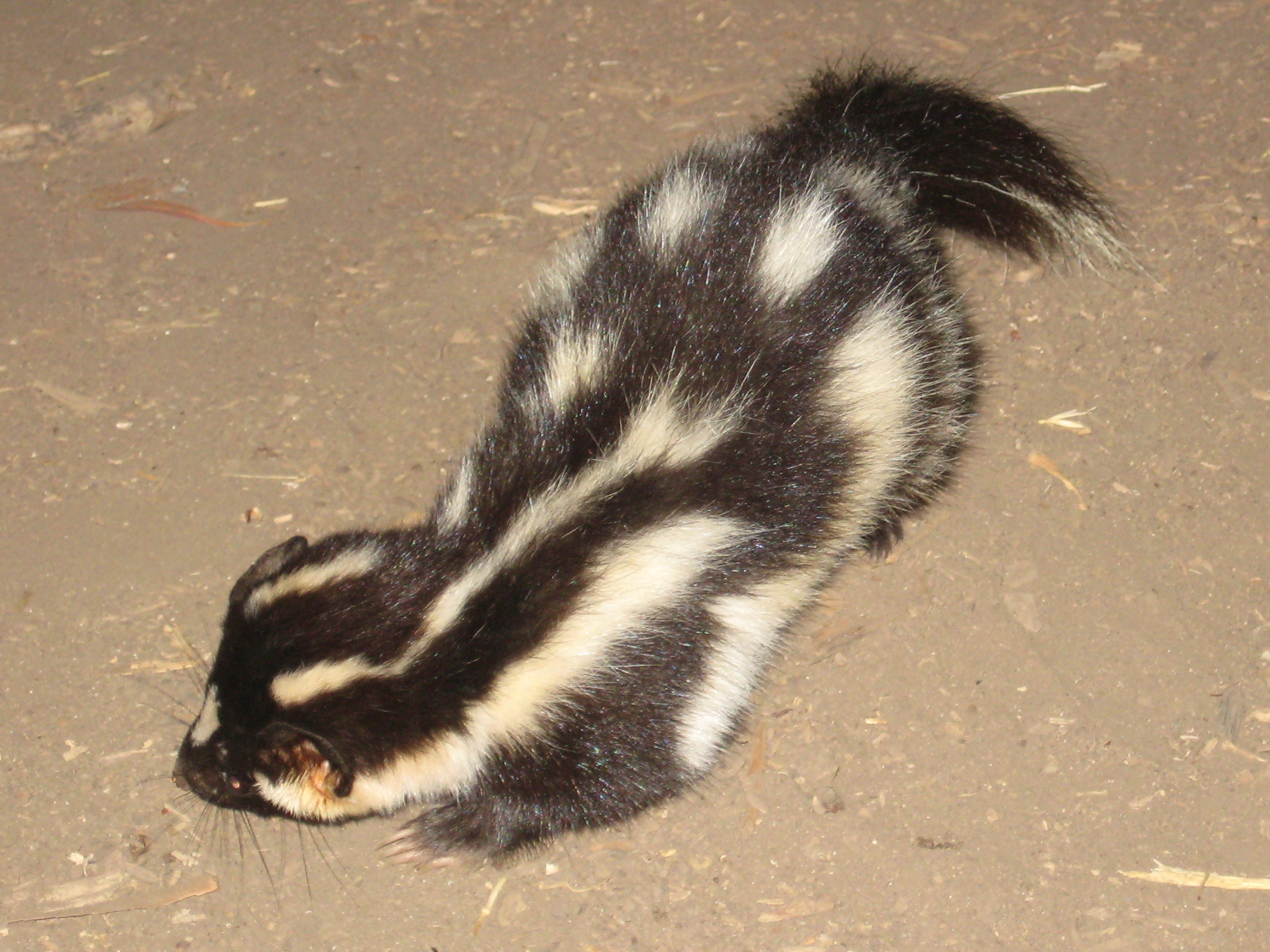

Conservation status
- Vulnerable (NatureServe)

Scientific classification
- Kingdom: Animalia
- Phylum: Chordata
- Class: Mammalia
- Order: Carnivora
- Family: Mephitidae
- Genus: Spilogale
- Species: S. gracilis
- Subspecies: S. g. amphialus

Trinomial name
- Spilogale gracilis amphialus Dickey, 1929

Synonyms
- Spilogale gracilis amphiala Dickey, 1929; Spilogale phenax amphialus Dickey, 1929; Spilogale putorius amphiala Dickey, 1929

= Island spotted skunk =

Subspecies of carnivore

The island spotted skunk (Spilogale gracilis amphiala) is an insular endemic carnivore and a subspecies of the western spotted skunk (Spilogale gracilis). Little is known about their exact variations from the mainland spotted skunk and variations between locations, resolution of which awaits further genetic and morphologic evaluation. The skunk is only currently found on two islands off the southern coast of California (Santa Cruz Island, and Santa Rosa Island, where its occurrence is rare). Its presence has been recorded on San Miguel Island, but it has since been declared extinct in that area. The Channel Island skunk is one of two terrestrial carnivores on the islands, the other being the island fox. It is designated as a species of special concern by the state of California.

== Distribution and habitat ==
=== Range ===
The island spotted skunk is endemic to the Channel Islands off the coast of Southern California. It currently is only found on Santa Rosa and Santa Cruz islands where it is widely distributed. There are previous reports of this taxon living on San Miguel island as well. Record of its inhabitance on San Miguel island ceased after the late nineteen hundreds and it is believed to be extirpated from this region. As of 2011, there were reportedly 3,000 Island Spotted Skunks on Santa Rosa island alone. However, after the recovery of the island fox in the mid-2000s, skunk sightings have become rare once again.

=== Habitat ===
The island spotted skunk exhibits habitat preferences similar to those of the mainland species. Its dens have been found in various types of locations including, but not limited to, beneath shrubs, open grasslands, rocky slopes, and beneath the roots of large trees. Difference in habitat preference varied slightly between the two islands. Skunks on Santa Rosa mainly being found in rocky canyon slopes, cactus patches, chaparral, coastal sage scrub, open woodland areas, and riparian habitats along streams. On Santa Cruz Island, skunks are found to prefer chaparral-grasslands, open grasslands, fennel-grasslands, and ravines. Skunks were also found to make dens beneath human dwellings and buildings.

== Description ==
Island spotted skunks show little morphological variation between islands, aside from the skunks found on Santa Rosa Island being slightly longer than those found on Santa Cruz Island. It is distinguished from mainland spotted skunks by its shorter tail with less white ventral coloration (45% white compared to 55% white), slightly larger size, broader skull, and proportionately less white and more black in pelage color. They also tend to have smoother, glossier fur than the mainland variation. It can be identified by an arrangement of white stripes on black fur, running vertically down the back. There are 4 to 6 stripes and they are usually broken up to give the skunk its “spotted” appearance. The abdomen is white and there is also a small white triangle on the forehead. On average, males tend to be about 23% larger than females.

== Behavior ==
=== Diet ===
Island skunks exhibit similar diets to those of mainland skunks. They are carnivorous, and unlike their mainland relatives who mostly consume insects, feed primarily on Island Deer Mice. Analysis of skunks on Santa Cruz Island showed consumption of insects and occasional lizards in addition to the Deer Mice. Insects consisted mainly of Jerusalem Crickets, along with grasshoppers, crickets, beetles, caterpillars, ear wigs, and ants. Seasonally available fruits and berries are also part of the skunks diet, including grapes, summer holly, stems, and cactus fruits. The Channel Island skunk is one of two terrestrial carnivores living on the island, the other being the Island Fox. The two species are in competition for resources and the Island Skunk's diet became more omnivorous in the 1990s due to a decrease in Island Fox populations. In recent years, skunks have been observed expanding their carnivorous diets to include seabirds. The birds typically nest in sea caves and this recent expansion has been attributed to an increase in population following the decline of foxes.

=== Activity ===
Skunks are nocturnal animals. Activity begins at dusk, peaks during early evening, and continues until dawn. Individuals use several dens distributed throughout their home range. Females have been known to simultaneously share a den, while males are more likely to share the same den sequentially.

=== Reproduction ===
Channel Island skunks have similar mating behaviors to mainland skunks and exhibit the same delayed implantation. Mating occurs throughout the months of September and October, followed by delayed implantation, and a 210- to 310-day gestation period. They typically give birth during the months of April and May to anywhere from 2 to 6 young.

== Conservation status ==
The Island spotted skunk is listed as a species of special concern by the state of California. This is because populations were thought to be low due to rare sightings which restrict the ability to study it, and therefore little was known about the subspecies. Although it was thought to be more abundant in the past (early 20th century), it is now listed as a Class II status of concern due to its restricted distribution. The skunk's small population size can be attributed to several factors. The first of which being loss and degradation of habitat resulting from over grazing by domestic livestock (cattle and horses) and feral nonnative herbivores (sheep, deer, elk). Another possible threat to the skunk is introduction of diseases by domestic cats and dogs brought to the island as pets. The species occurs widely on Santa Cruz island, but is uncommon to rare, and is more common on Santa Rosa island. During the 1990s, the island skunk population saw an increase due to reduced competition from their natural competitor, the island fox. The fox's population decreased dramatically following the colonization of the Channel Islands by the golden eagle.

=== Conservation efforts ===
Action has been taken to try and increase skunk populations on the islands. In the early 1980s 38,000 feral sheep were removed from Santa Cruz Island and cattle ranching operations terminated in 1988. Despite these efforts, feral pigs continue to pose a great threat to skunk populations as their rooting destroys skunk dens. Skunks are specialized in their resources and therefore sensitive to competition with feral pigs for invertebrate foods. The future of skunk populations on Santa Rosa Island is expected to be positive due to the eradication of feral pigs in the '80s.

=== Updated status ===
The status of skunks on Santa Cruz Island was reevaluated in 1998, six years after previous research done in 1992, which helped to determine the Island skunks as rare or of special concern. Across the six-year period a sudden increase in skunk populations was observed. This was attributed to several possible factors such as high rainfall in 1998 after many years of drought, which was thought to have stimulated plant growth. This could have in turn, stimulated reproduction because of the delayed implantation exhibited by the skunks which could allow them to increase fecundity during good years. Additionally, the skunks could be responding to recovery efforts on the island. The skunks most direct competitor for resources, the island fox, had also been exhibiting a population decline which would result in less competition for the resource specific island skunk. Skunk populations showed a remarkable increase over a ten-year period, and in 2011 approximately 3,000 skunks were marked and counted during population monitoring. As fox populations recovered in the 2000s and 2010s, skunk captures became rare once again.

== Recent genetic testing ==
Recent genetic research was done on Channel Island skunks to determine genetic variation in skunks between islands. Morphologically skunks on both islands do not seem to vary whatsoever, except that the skunks on Santa Rosa Island are slightly longer than those on Santa Cruz Island. The study found that genetic variation between the two island species was not consistent with the morphological variation and was much greater than that of the mainland species. This conclusion has led researchers to hypothesize that spotted skunks were brought to the islands either by rafting or intentionally by Native Americans. The genetic variation between mainland skunks and those on the islands is enough to cause researchers to propose that the taxonomic classification of the skunks as S. g. amphiala be reconsidered, and that each island population be considered a separate subspecies or even a new species separate from the mainland one.
