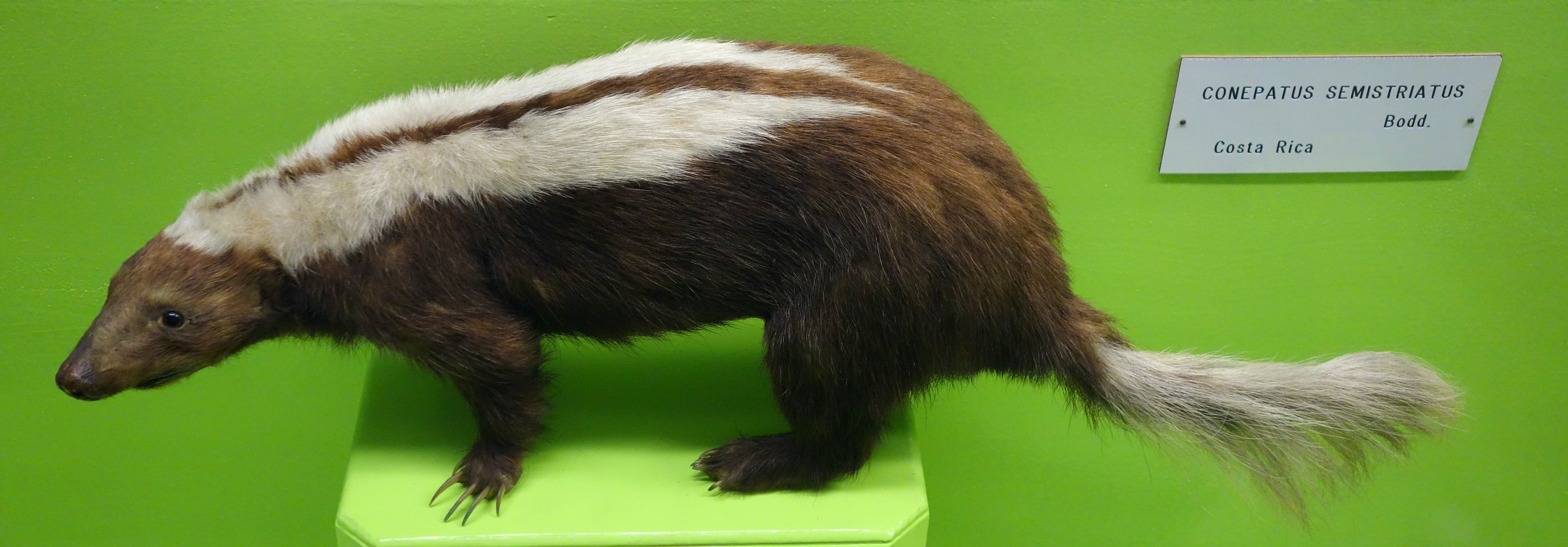

Conservation status
- Least Concern (IUCN 3.1)

Scientific classification
- Kingdom: Animalia
- Phylum: Chordata
- Class: Mammalia
- Order: Carnivora
- Family: Mephitidae
- Genus: Conepatus
- Species: C. semistriatus

Binomial name
- Conepatus semistriatus (Boddaert, 1785)
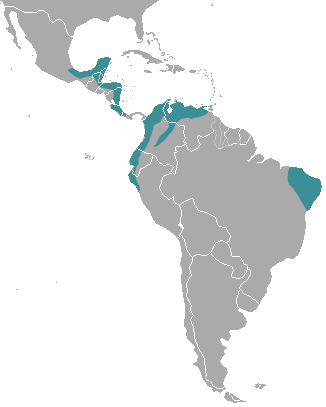
- Striped hog-nosed skunk range

= Striped hog-nosed skunk =

Species of carnivore

The striped hog-nosed skunk (Conepatus semistriatus) is a skunk species that is found in Central and South America. It is distributed from southern Mexico to northern Peru, and in a pocket in the extreme east of Brazil. They live in a wide range of habitats such as dry forests, orchards, and occasionally in rainforests. It is classified as least concern in the IUCN Red List.

== Taxonomy ==
The striped hog-nosed skunk (Conepatus semistriatus) belongs to the genus Conepatus. It comes under the family Mephitidae, which includes skunks and stink badgers. It was first described by Pieter Boddaert in 1785.

== Distribution and habitat ==
The range of striped hog-nosed skunk extends from southern Mexico in Central America to northern Peru in South America, and in a pocket in the extreme east of Brazil. They live in a wide range of habitats, including arboreal caatingas, orchards, and dry forest scrubs, grasslands, and occasionally, in rainforests. In the wet season, they prefer higher grounds in deciduous forests. They usually reside in small dens made from fallen tree logs or burrows of about 1–2 m (3 ft 3 in – 6 ft 7 in) length dug below the surface. They also use burrows dug by other animals. It is classified as least concern in the IUCN Red List.

== Morphology ==
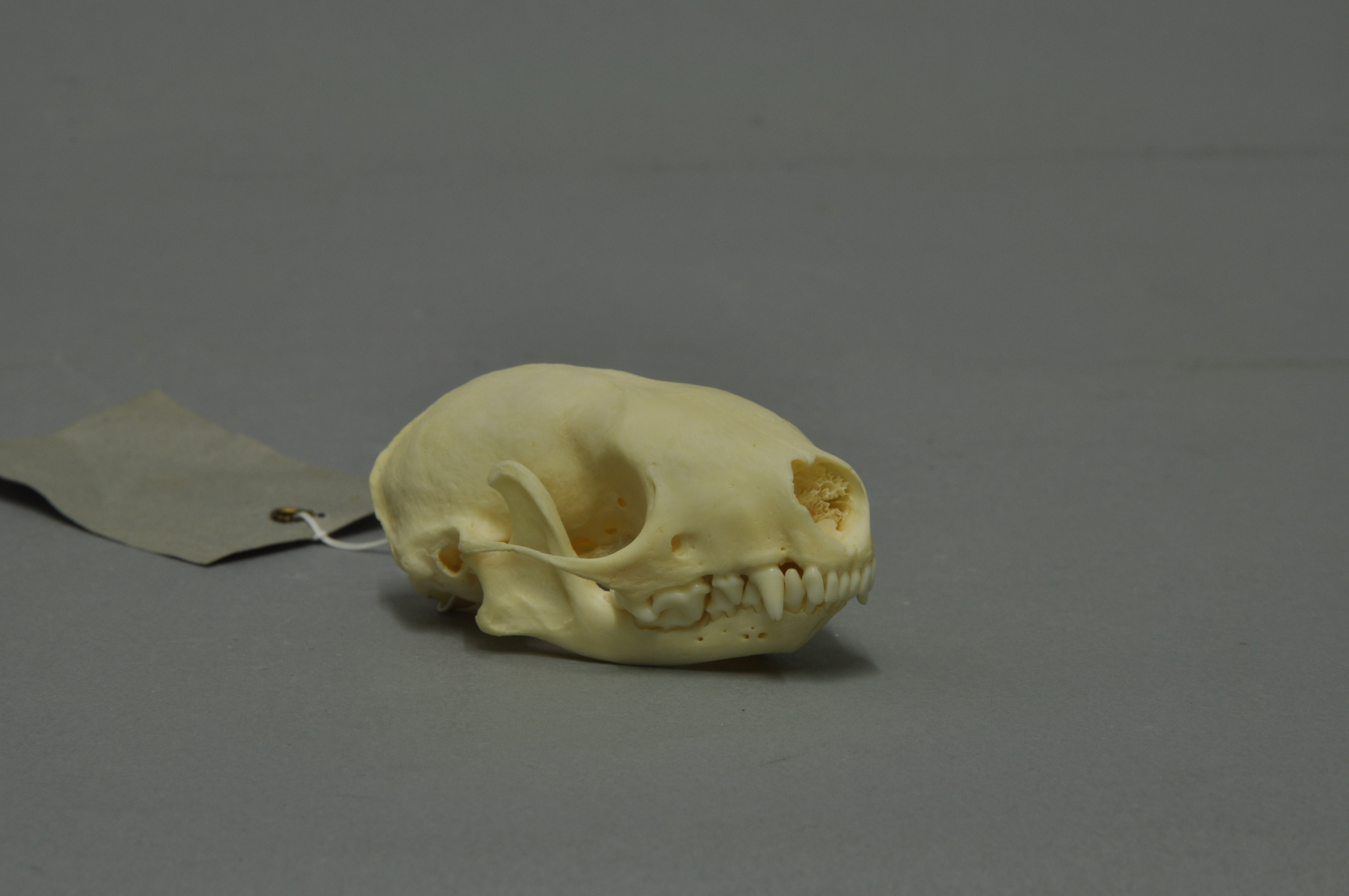
Skull

The species measures about 35–50 cm (14–20 in) from head to tail with the females slightly smaller than the males. It weighs about 1.4–3.5 kg (3.1–7.7 lb) and has a short tail covered with black hair. The snout small and is typically black. The fur varies in color and has two narrow white stripes running from the head to the rump. The species has long claws and forelimbs adapted for digging. They also have specialized skunk glands used to spray a fluid as a means of defense against predators like pit vipers (hog-nosed skunks are resistant to pit viper venom, at least in the Andes).

== Behaviour ==
It is a nocturnal solitary animal, and are mostly active after sunset. The animals are rarely seen during the daylight hours. They are omnivores feeding on invertebrates, small vertebrates and fruits. The species breed in the early spring. It produces a litter of two to five animals after a gestation period of about 60 days.

== Gallery ==
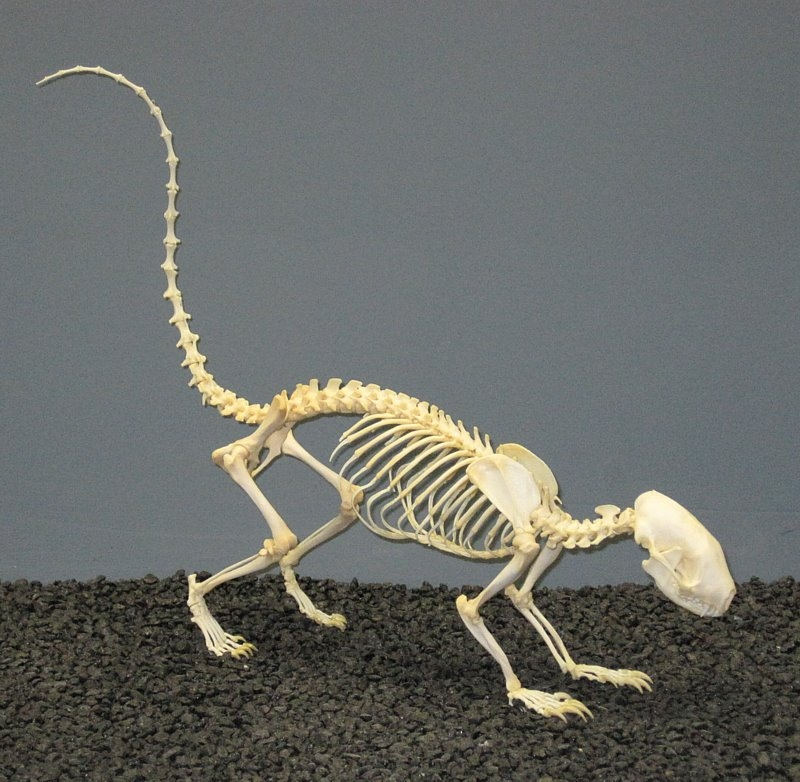
Striped skunk skeleton

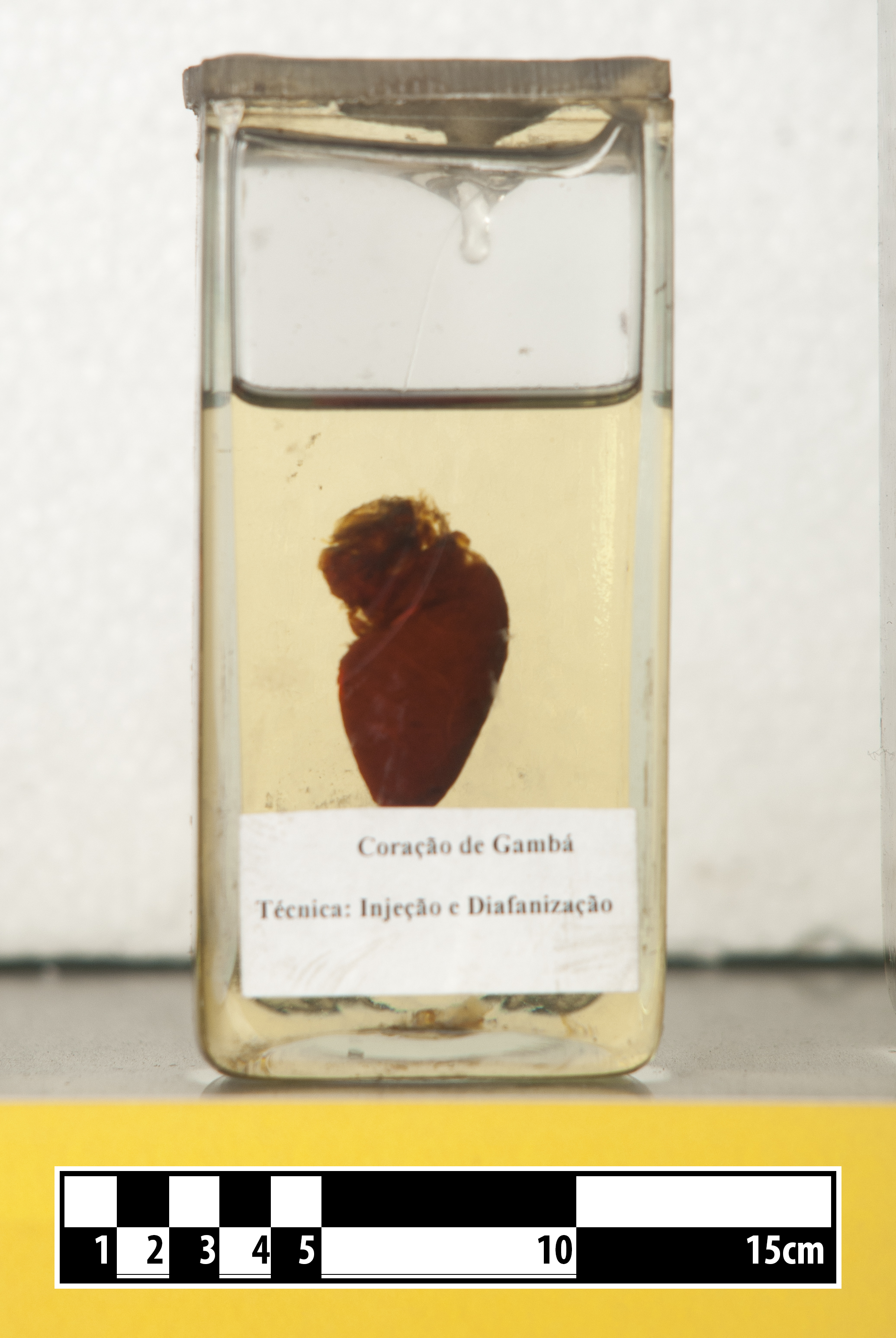
Skunk heart

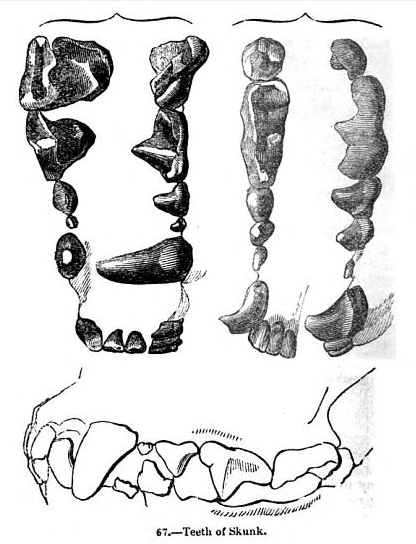
Teeth of a striped skunk
