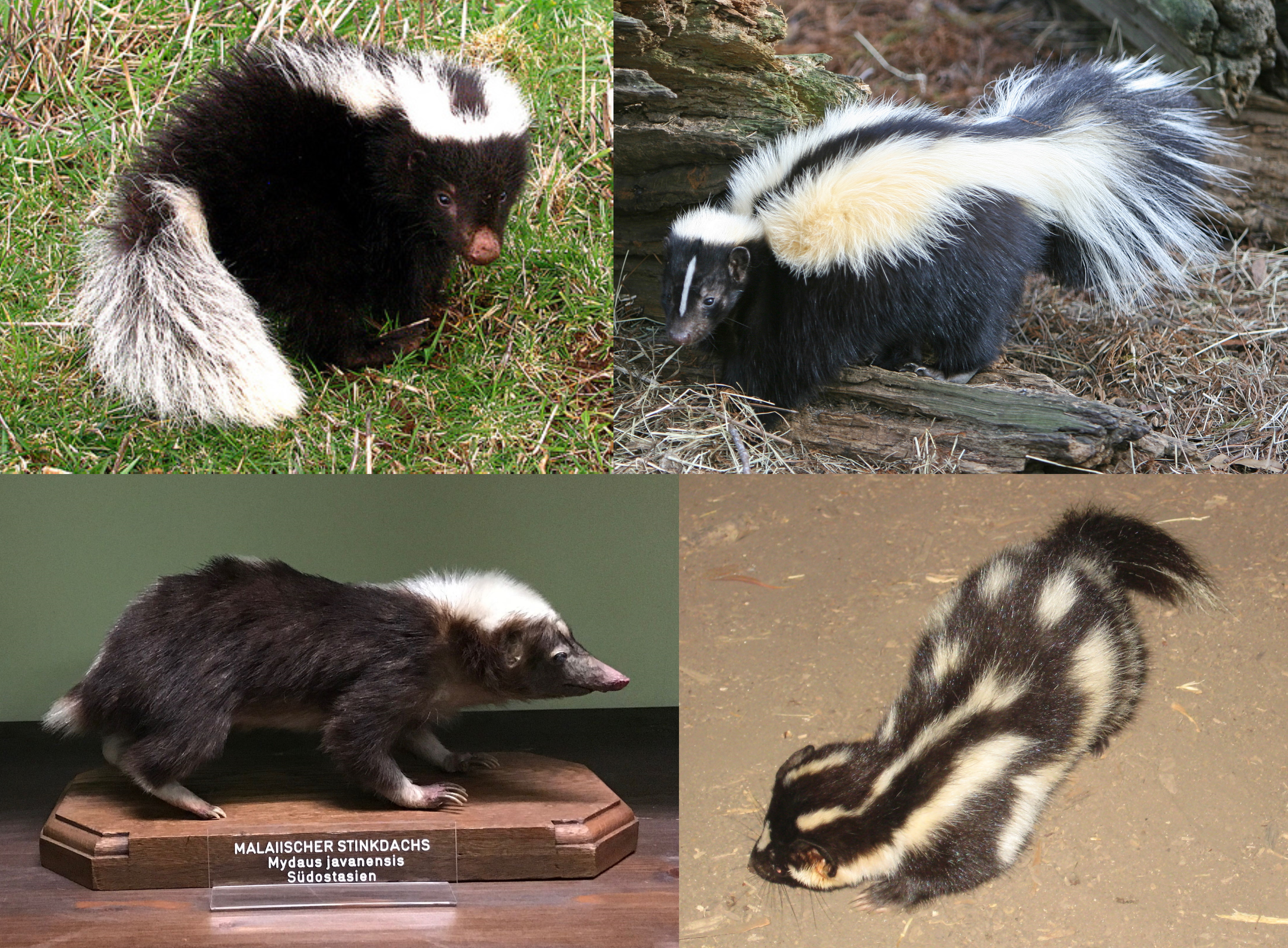
- Molina's hog-nosed skunk (Conepatus chinga), striped skunk (Mephitis mephitis), Sunda stink badger (Mydaus javanensis) and western spotted skunk (Spilogale gracilis)

Scientific classification
- Kingdom: Animalia
- Phylum: Chordata
- Class: Mammalia
- Order: Carnivora
- Superfamily: Musteloidea
- Family: Mephitidae; Bonaparte, 1845

Type genus
- Mephitis Geoffroy and Cuvier, 1795

Genera
- Conepatus; Mydaus; Mephitis; Spilogale †Brachyprotoma †Palaeomephitis †Promephitis
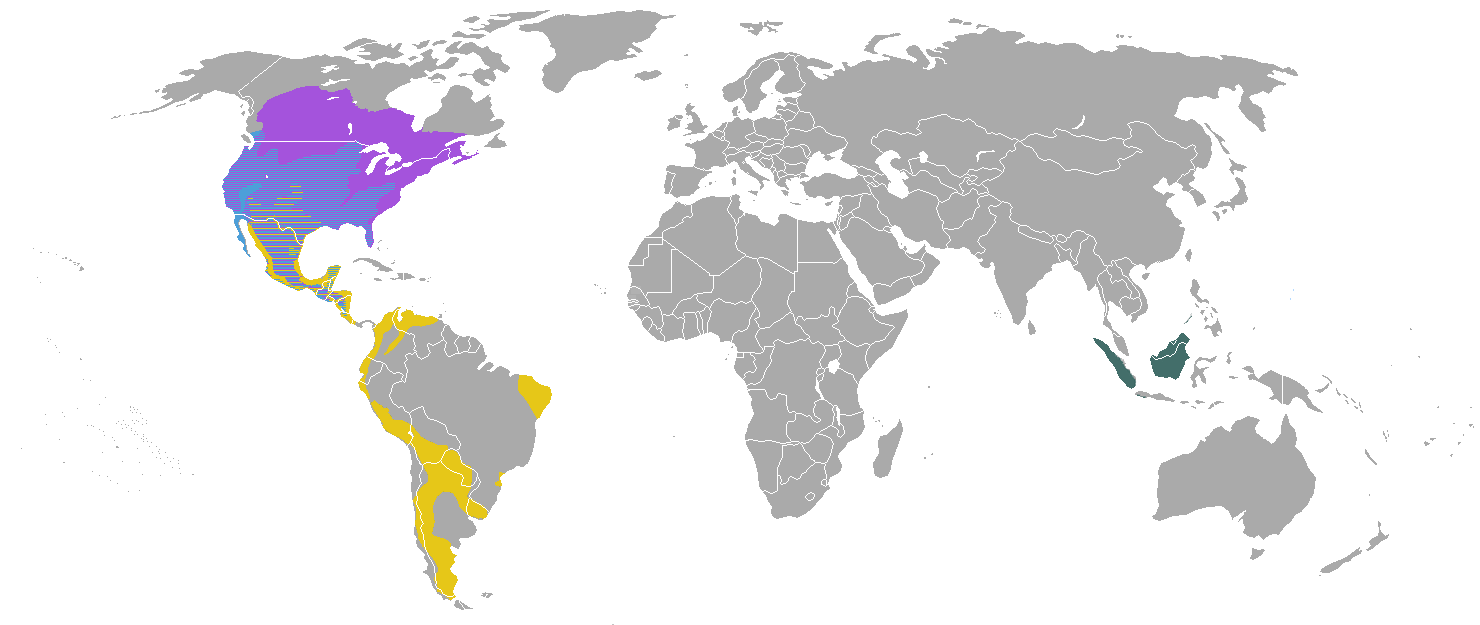
- Mephitidae range

= Mephitidae =

Mephitidae Temporal range: Middle Miocene to present

Family of mammals

Mephitidae is a family of mammals comprising the skunks and stink badgers. They are noted for the great development of their anal scent glands, which they use to deter predators. Skunks were formerly classified as a subfamily of the Mustelidae (the weasel family); however, in the 1990s, genetic evidence caused skunks to be treated as a separate family. Similarly, the stink badgers had been classified with badgers, but genetic evidence shows they share a more recent common ancestor with skunks, so they are now included in the skunk family. A 2017 study using retroposon markers indicated that they are most closely related to the Ailuridae (red pandas and allies) and Procyonidae (raccoons and allies).

There are sixteen extant species of mephitids in four genera: Conepatus (hog-nosed skunks, four species); Mephitis (the hooded and striped skunks, two species); Mydaus (stink badgers, two species); and Spilogale (spotted skunks, eight species). The two stink badgers in the genus Mydaus inhabit Indonesia, Brunei, Malaysia and the Philippines; the other members of the family inhabit the Americas, ranging from Canada to central South America. All other mephitids are extinct, known through fossils, including those from Eurasia.

In taxonomic order, the living species of Mephitidae are:

== Genera ==
Image	Genus	Living species
	Mydaus Cuvier, 1821	Mydaus javanensis – Indonesian or Sunda stink badger (Teledu); Mydaus marchei – Palawan stink badger
	Conepatus Gray, 1837	Conepatus chinga – Molina's hog-nosed skunk; Conepatus humboldtii – Humboldt's hog-nosed skunk; Conepatus leuconotus – American hog-nosed skunk; Conepatus semistriatus – striped hog-nosed skunk
	Spilogale Gray, 1865	Spilogale amphiala - island spotted skunk; Spilogale angustifrons – southern spotted skunk; Spilogale gracilis – western spotted skunk; Spilogale interrupta -plains spotted skunk; Spilogale leucoparia -desert spotted skunk; Spilogale putorius – eastern spotted skunk; Spilogale pygmaea – pygmy spotted skunk; Spilogale yucatanensis -Yucatán spotted skunk
	Mephitis É. Geoffroy Saint-Hilaire and Cuvier, 1795	Mephitis macroura – hooded skunk; Mephitis mephitis – striped skunk
