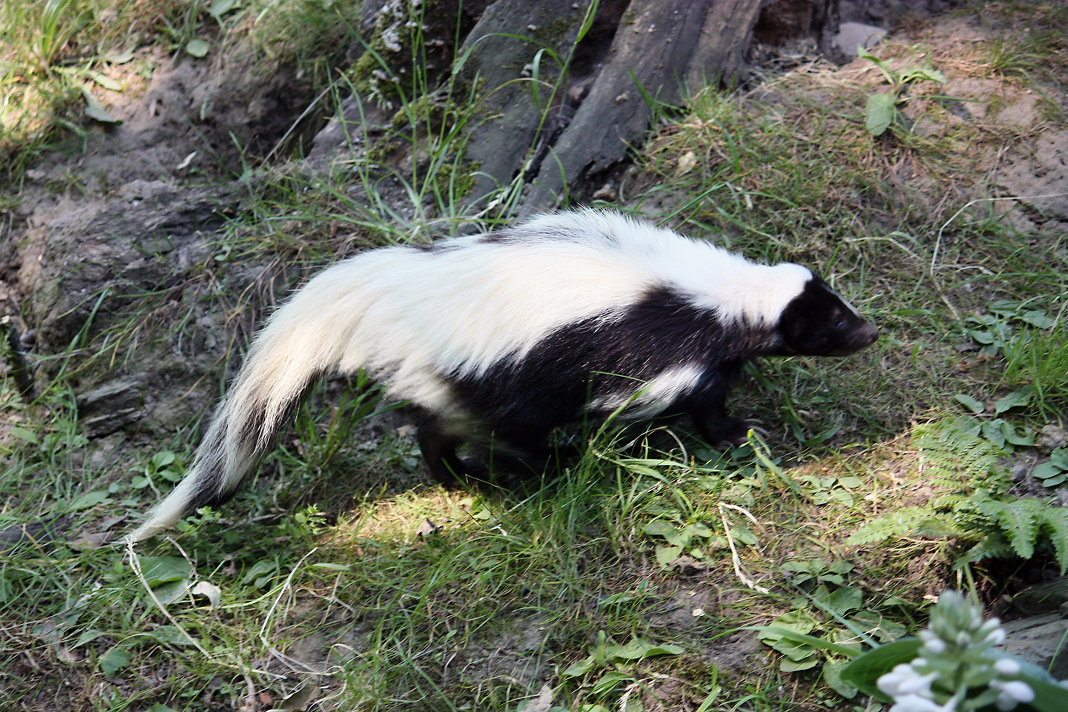

Conservation status
- Least Concern (IUCN 3.1)

Scientific classification
- Kingdom: Animalia
- Phylum: Chordata
- Class: Mammalia
- Order: Carnivora
- Family: Mephitidae
- Genus: Mephitis
- Species: M. macroura

Binomial name
- Mephitis macroura Lichtenstein, 1832
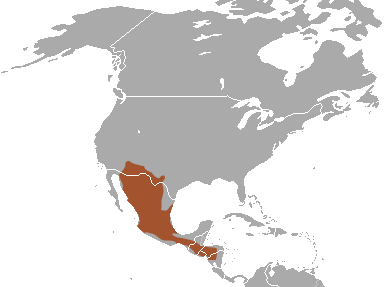
- Hooded skunk range

= Hooded skunk =

Species of carnivore

The hooded skunk (Mephitis macroura) is a species of mammal in the family Mephitidae. Mephītis in Latin means "foul odor", μακρός (makrós) in Greek translates to "long" and οὐρά (ourá) translates to "tail".

== Morphology ==
It can be distinguished from the similar striped skunk (M. mephitis) by its longer tail and longer, much softer coat of fur, and larger tympanic bullae. A ruff of white fur around its neck gives the animal its common name. Three color phases are known and in all three, a thin white medial stripe is present between the eyes: black-backed with two lateral white stripes, white-backed with one dorsal white stripe, or entirely black with a few white hairs in the tail.

== Ecology ==
The hooded skunk ranges from the Southwestern United States to Mexico, Guatemala, Honduras, Nicaragua, and northwest Costa Rica. It is more abundant in Mexico. These skunks are found to be more than 50% smaller in southern Mexico than in the Southwestern United States. It is found in grasslands, deserts, and in the foothills of mountains, avoiding high elevations. It tends to live near a water source, such as a river. The females tend to be 15% smaller than the males and their breeding season is between February and March. The litter size ranges from three to eight.

== Diet ==
The diet of the hooded skunk consists mostly of vegetation, especially prickly pear (Opuntia spp.), but it will readily consume insects, small vertebrates, fruit, bird eggs, and human garbage as well. Hooded skunks in Costa Rica utilize their forelimbs to throw bird eggs between their hindlegs, in order to break the eggs open. In the wild, their stomach contents include 74.3% insects, with 50% of their diet consisting of earwigs, stink bugs, and beetles. Vertebrate tissues made up 12% of the diet, and only about 1% of the diet consisted of plant material. No cases of rabies are reported, but they host a range of parasites, including nematodes, roundworms, and fleas.

== Behavior ==
Hooded skunks are solitary, but they might interact at a feeding ground without showing any signs of aggression. They shelter in a burrow or a nest of thick plant cover during the day and are active at night. Like M. mephitis, for self-defense, they spray volatile components from their anal glands. Seven major components comprised 99% of the volatiles in this secretion: (E)-2-butene-1-thiol, 3-methyl-1-butanethiol, S-(E)-2-butenyl thioacetate, S-3-methylbutenyl thioacetate, s2-phenylethanethiol, 2-methylquinoline, and 2-quinolinemethanethiol

== Characteristics ==
Hooded skunks are currently not endangered. They are very abundant in Mexico and can live in human suburban areas mostly on pastures and cultivated fields. Their fur has low economic value. However, their fat and scent glands can be used in local folk medicine. In some parts of their range, their flesh is considered a delicacy. Other common names for the hooded skunk include: mofeta rayada (Spanish), moufette à capuchon (French), pay (Maya), southern skunk, white-sided skunk, and zorillo.
