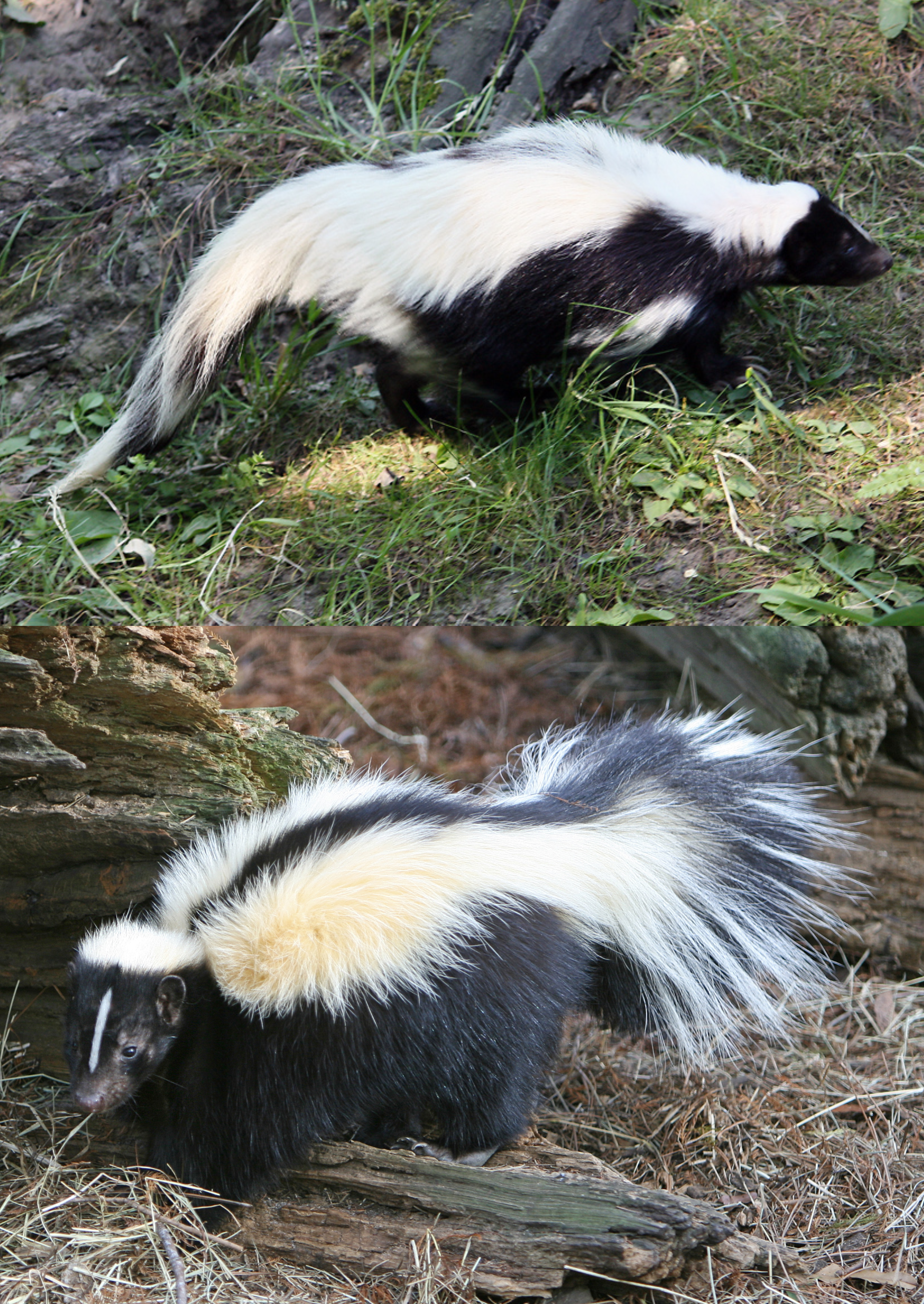
- Hooded skunk (M. macroura) and striped skunk (M. mephitis)

Scientific classification
- Kingdom: Animalia
- Phylum: Chordata
- Class: Mammalia
- Order: Carnivora
- Family: Mephitidae
- Genus: Mephitis; É. Geoffroy Saint-Hilaire & G. Cuvier, 1795

Type species
- Viverra mephitis Schreber, 1776

Species
- Mephitis mephitis Mephitis macroura
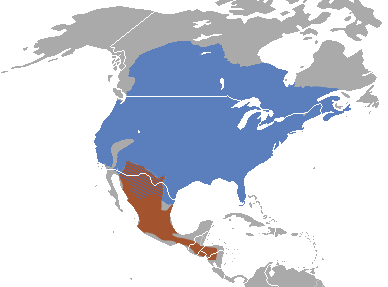
- Mephitis ranges

= Mephitis (genus) =

Genus of carnivores

Mephitis is one of several genera of skunks and comprises two species, both of which are found in North America.

Image	Scientific name	Common name	Distribution
	Mephitis mephitis	Striped skunk	Southern Canada, the United States and northern Mexico
	Mephitis macroura	Hooded skunk	Southwestern United States to Mexico, Guatemala, Honduras, Nicaragua, and northwest Costa Rica
