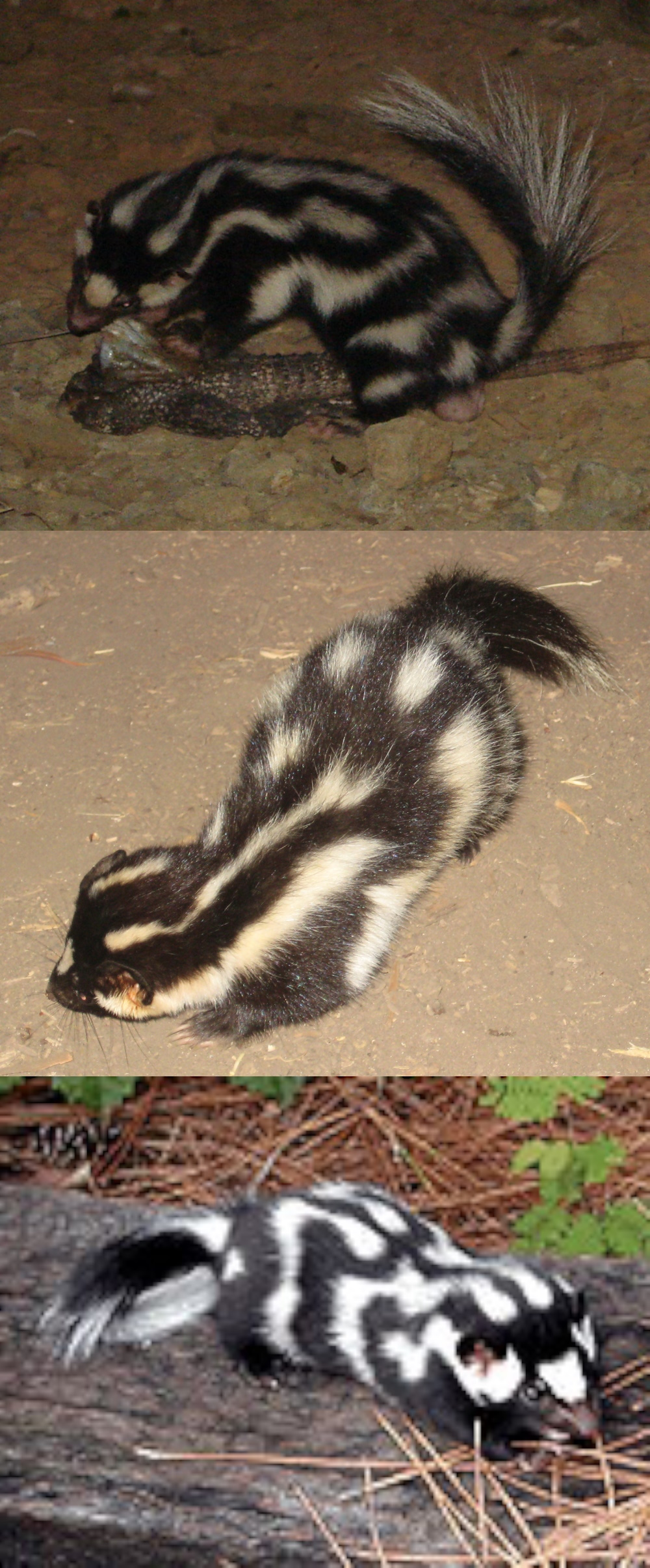
- Southern spotted skunk (S. angustifrons), western spotted skunk (S. gracilis) and eastern spotted skunk (S. putorius).

Scientific classification
- Kingdom: Animalia
- Phylum: Chordata
- Class: Mammalia
- Order: Carnivora
- Family: Mephitidae
- Genus: Spilogale; Gray, 1865

Type species
- Viverra putorius Linnaeus, 1758
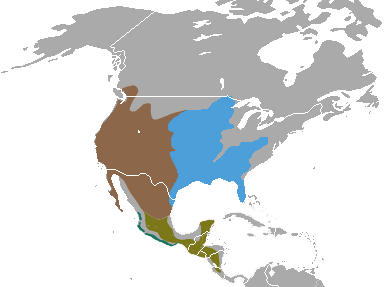
- Spotted skunk ranges Spilogale gracilis Merriam, 1890 Spilogale putorius (Linnaeus, 1758) Spilogale pygmaea Thomas, 1898 Spilogale angustifrons Howell, 1902

= Spotted skunk =

Genus of carnivores

Spotted skunks are species of skunk belonging to the genus Spilogale.

== Description ==
Species of Spilogale are relatively small, black skunks variously patterned with white stripes and blotches. Males in the genus are much larger than the females and have considerably longer tails.

== Range ==
Spotted skunk species occur in most of the United States, except for the northeastern region, the eastern coastal area, and Montana along with parts of neighboring states. They may enter Canada just north of Minnesota and British Columbia. Toward the south, species occur in most of Mexico, mostly avoiding coastal areas along the western Gulf and the Pacific, though a species is found in Baja California. South of Mexico a species extends south into El Salvador, though avoiding the Caribbean coast.

== Habitat ==
Habitat preferences depend on the species. The Eastern spotted skunk may be found at forest edges and upland prairie grasslands, especially where rock outcrops and shrub clumps are present, sometimes even in abandoned farm buildings. The Desert spotted skunk occurs in deserts and semideserts. The Yucatan spotted skunk lives in tropical scrub forest, and other species have their own preferences.

Although they have very effective digging claws, spotted skunks prefer to occupy dens that are made by gophers, wood rats, pocket gophers, striped skunks, or armadillos. They occupy dens that are positioned to be completely dark inside. Spilogale are very social creatures and frequently share dens with up to seven other skunks. Although skunks often live in this way, maternal dens are not open to non-maternal skunks.

== Biology ==
=== Reproduction ===
Around the time of March, the males' testes begin to enlarge and are most massive by late September. The increase in size is accompanied by a larger testosterone production. Similarly, a female begins to experience an increase in ovarian activity in March. Spilogale begin to mate during March as well. Implantation occurs approximately 14–16 days after mating. For the western spotted skunk, most copulations occur in late September and the beginning of October. Post copulation the zygotes are subject to normal cleavage but stop at the blastocyst stage, where they can remain in the uterus for roughly 6.5 months. After implantation, gestation lasts 30 days and between April and June their offspring are born. Although litter sizes vary considerably, the average litter size is about 5.5 and the gender ratio is 65 M: 35 F.

=== Growth ===
The newborn skunks are covered with fine hair that shows the adult color pattern. The eyes open between 30 and 32 days. The kits start solid food at about 42 days and are weaned at about two months. They are full grown and reach adult size at about four months. The males do not help in raising the young.

== Defenses ==
Spotted skunks protect themselves by spraying a strong and unpleasant scent. Two glands on the sides of the anus release the odorous oil through nipples. When threatened, the skunk turns its body into a U-shape with the head and anus facing the attacker. Muscles around the nipples of the scent gland aim them, giving the skunk great accuracy on targets up to 15 feet away. As a warning before spraying, the skunk stamps its front feet, raises its tail, and hisses. They may warn with a unique "hand stand"—the back vertical and the tail waving.

The liquid is secreted via paired anal subcutaneous glands that are connected to the body through striated muscles. The odorous solution is emitted as an atomized spray that is nearly invisible or as streams of larger droplets.

Skunks store about 1 tablespoon (15 g) of the odorous oil and can quickly spray five times in row. It takes about one week to replenish the oil.

The secretion of the spotted skunks differs from that of the striped skunks. The two major thiols of the striped skunks, (E)-2-butene-1-thiol and 3-methyl-1-butanethiol are the major components in the secretion of the spotted skunks along with a third thiol, 2-phenylethanethiol.

Thioacetate derivatives of the three thiols are present in the spray of the striped skunks but not the spotted skunks. They are not as odoriferous as the thiols. Water hydrolysis converts them to the more potent thiols. This chemical conversion may be why pets that have been sprayed by skunks will have a faint "skunky" odor on damp evenings.

== Deodorizing ==
Changing the thiols into compounds that have little or no odor can be done by oxidizing the thiols to sulfonic acids. Hydrogen peroxide and baking soda (sodium bicarbonate) are mild enough to be used on people and animals but change hair color.

Stronger oxidizing agents, like sodium hypochlorite solutions—liquid laundry bleach—are cheap and effective for deodorizing other materials.

== Diet ==
Skunks are omnivorous and will eat small rodents, fruits, berries, birds, eggs, insects and larvae, lizards, snakes, and carrion. Their diet may vary with the seasons as food availability fluctuates. They have a keen sense of smell that helps them find grubs and other food. Their hearing is acute but they have poor vision.

== Life expectancy ==
Spotted skunks can live 10 years in captivity, but in the wild, about half the skunks die after 1 or 2 years.

== Conservation ==
The eastern spotted skunk, S. putorius, is a conservation concern. Management is hampered by an overall lack of information from surveying. During the 1940s, Spilogale populations seemingly crashed and the species is currently listed by various state agencies as endangered, threatened, or 'of concern' across much of its range. The species S. pygmaea is endemic to the Mexican Pacific coast and is currently threatened. The tropical dry forest of western Mexico, where these skunks live, is a highly threatened ecosystem that has been placed on conservation priority. S. pygmaea is also the smallest carnivore native to Mexico as well as one of the smallest worldwide.

New research, however, proposes that there may be up to seven.

== Species ==
As of 2025, the following species are recognized:

Image	Scientific name	Common name	Distribution
	Spilogale angustifrons Howell, 1902	Southern spotted skunk	southern Mexico south into Costa Rica
	Spilogale gracilis Merriam, 1890	Western spotted skunk	western United States, northern Mexico, and southwestern British Columbia
	Spilogale interrupta Rafinesque, 1820	Prairie spotted skunk	north-central to south-central US, also in southern Manitoba in Canada, and Mexico (northeast near Gulf coast)
	Spilogale leucoparia Merriam, 1890	Desert spotted skunk	southwestern United States south into northwestern Mexico
	Spilogale putorius (Linnaeus, 1758)	Eastern spotted skunk	Southeastern US except the east coast; in the Appalachians north into Pennsylvania
	Spilogale pygmaea Thomas, 1898	Pygmy spotted skunk	Pacific coast of Mexico
	Spilogale yucatanensis Burt, 1938	Yucatan spotted skunk	Yucatan Peninsula of Mexico
