= Pygmy spotted skunk =

Conservation status
- Vulnerable (IUCN 3.1)

Scientific classification
- Kingdom: Animalia
- Phylum: Chordata
- Class: Mammalia
- Order: Carnivora
- Family: Mephitidae
- Genus: Spilogale
- Species: S. pygmaea

Binomial name
- Spilogale pygmaea Thomas, 1898
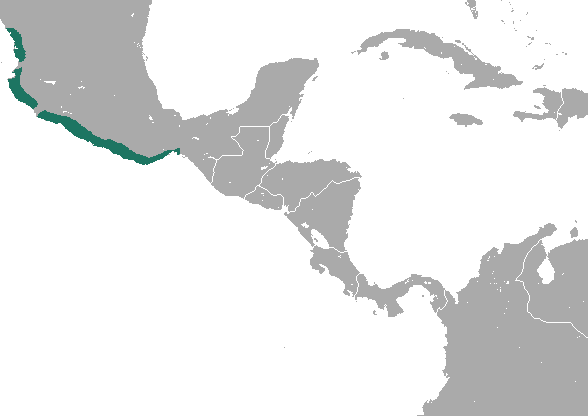
- Pygmy spotted skunk range

Species of carnivore

The pygmy spotted skunk (Spilogale pygmaea) is a species of mammal in the family Mephitidae. It is endemic to Mexico.

== Distribution and habitat ==
The pygmy skunk inhabits along the Pacific coast of Mexico. It is found in woodlands and thickets in rocky soil. They avoid dense forests and swamps. It dens in burrows, but can take refuge in trees.

== Description ==
The spotted skunks are the most similar to the weasels of the skunks. It has a slimmer body, and tail coat thinner and smaller than their close relatives. It reaches a length of 115–345 mm with a tail of 70–120 mm. Its coat has a black background with white spots on the forehead and characteristics of 2-6 white stripes on the back and flanks. The bands become spots on the back later. The tip of the tail is often white. Like all skunks, it has two large scent glands in the perianal region.

== Reproduction ==
The mating season occurs in September or October, but the delayed implantation of the embryo lasts until March or April of the next year. Embryonic development takes 28–31 days for a total duration of 230–250 days (counted from the moment of fertilization). Females give birth between 10 cubs per litter. Juveniles get their final color after 21 days, open their eyes at 32 days, can spray musk at 46 days and are weaned after two months. They reach adult size at 15 weeks and reach sexual maturity in time to participate in the mating season after their birth. The young disperse in the fall, but can pass the winter with their mothers in a communal den.

== Diet ==
This skunk is omnivorous, however, it is the most carnivorous of the family. It feeds mainly on insects, fruits, berries in the summer months, and hunts small mammals, birds, and reptiles during the winter. They can climb trees in pursuit of their prey and sometimes venturing into hen houses to take eggs.

== Behaviour ==
Juveniles have seen accompanying their mothers in their nocturnal hunting trips. These skunks often share large nests during winter, but will not hibernate. The species is strictly nocturnal. The first reaction in case of threat is to flee. When cornered, it becomes aggressive, bristling and raising its tail to appear larger. It can stand on its front legs and advance in that position against their attacker. If the threat persists, it returns to standing on four legs and folds back on itself in a U shape, pointing its tail at its enemy. That is when it sprays its odorous excretion.

== Conservation ==
The IUCN Red List species is classified as a vulnerable species due to the progressive reduction of its population, up to 30% over three generations (15 years) inferred by the percentage of habitat loss. This species has a restricted and discontinuous habitat in an area of Mexico in open development is threatened as a result of the activities related to tourism development. The species inhabits a variety of habitats and can survive under conditions of human intervention in these areas, but dogs and cats pose a threat.
