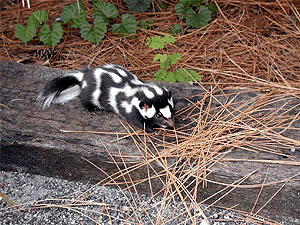

Conservation status
- Vulnerable (IUCN 3.1)

- Apparently Secure (NatureServe)

Scientific classification
- Kingdom: Animalia
- Phylum: Chordata
- Class: Mammalia
- Order: Carnivora
- Family: Mephitidae
- Genus: Spilogale
- Species: S. putorius

Binomial name
- Spilogale putorius (Linnaeus, 1758)
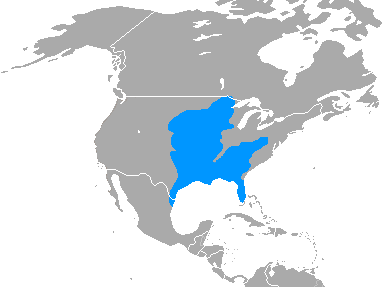
- range of Spilogale putorius

Synonyms
- Viverra putorius Linnaeus, 1758

= Eastern spotted skunk =

Species of carnivore

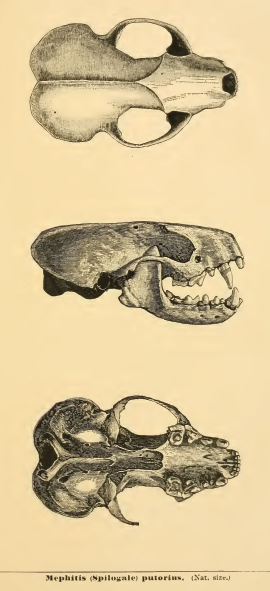
Skull

The eastern spotted skunk (Spilogale putorius) is a small, relatively slender skunk found in North America, in the central and parts of the southeastern United States and in small areas of Canada and Mexico.

The eastern spotted skunk is a very small skunk, no larger than a good-sized tree squirrel. Its body is more weasel-like in shape than the more familiar striped skunk. The eastern spotted skunk has four broken stripes on its back, giving it a "spotted" appearance. It has a white spot on its forehead. It is found in Canada (southeast Manitoba and northwestern Ontario), the United States and northeastern Mexico. Males, at 46.3–68.8 cm (18.2–27.1 in) in total length, are larger than females, at 35–54.4 cm (13.8–21.4 in). The tail accounts for roughly a third of its total length. Body mass can range from 0.2 to 1.8 kg (0.44 to 3.97 lb), with males averaging around 700 g (1.5 lb) against the female's average of 450 g (0.99 lb). Skull length is 43–55 mm (1.7–2.2 in).

It is much more active than any other type of skunk. It has mostly the same predators as any other skunk (big cats, bobcats, owls, humans, etc.). Up to eight skunks may share an underground den in the winter. It can also climb and take shelter in trees.

The Eastern spotted skunk seems to prefer forest edges and upland prairie grasslands, especially where rock outcrops and shrub clumps are present. In western counties, it relies heavily on riparian corridors where woody shrubs and woodland edges are present. Woody fencerows, odd areas, and abandoned farm buildings are also important habitat.

== Description ==
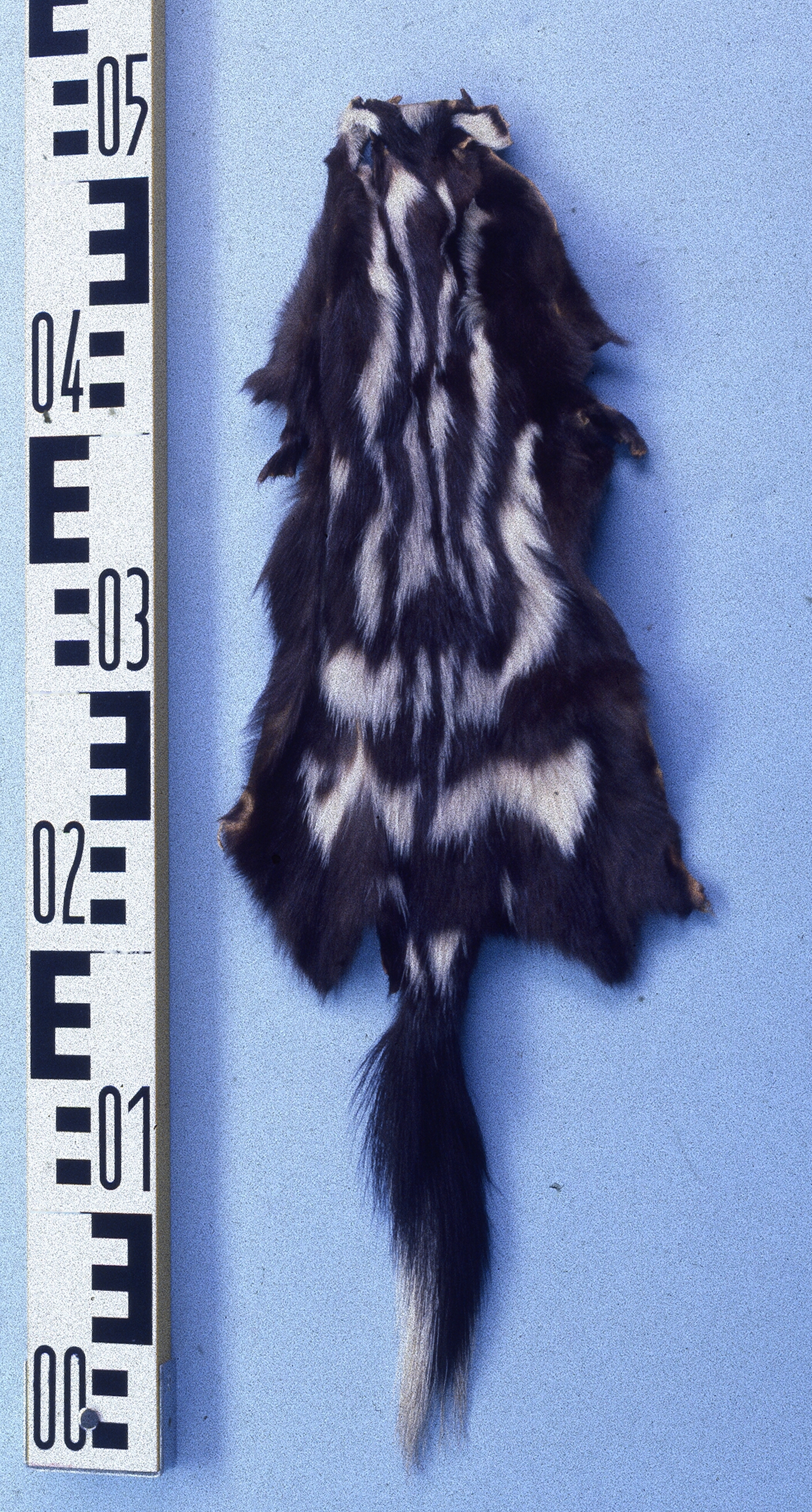
Pelt of Spilogale putorius

The eastern spotted skunk has a small weasel-like body with fine, dense black fur that has 4 to 6 broken, white stripes. Two of the stripes are located at the median of the body and four stripes are placed on the side running from the back of the head to the rear. White markings are present on both cheeks, as well as on the tip of the tail. This is known as an aposematic fur pattern and is thought to act as a warning to predators.

The typical body length of eastern spotted skunks is 24 to 26 centimetres (9.4 to 10.2 in) with a tail length from 11 to 19 centimetres (4.3 to 7.5 in), resulting in a total length of 35 to 45 centimetres (14 to 18 in). The feet are 40 to 53 millimetres (1.6 to 2.1 in) long, and the forefeet have claws approximately 7 millimetres (0.28 in) long, while the hind feet have claws that are around 3.5 centimetres (1.4 in). The feet are equipped with pads on the soles that aid in climbing. The large claws of the forefeet help the skunk dig and grasp prey. The total body weight of adults ranges from 400 to 965 grams (14.1 to 34.0 oz).

== Behavior ==
Eastern spotted skunks are quite secretive and elusive creatures, and it is a rarity for humans to see them. They are also nocturnal and tend to be more active during dry cool nights rather than warm wet nights. Although these skunks do not hibernate, they do tend to greatly reduce their activity when enduring intensely warm summers or very cold winters. Generally speaking, out of the four species, S. putorius is the most active. They are also more agile and vigilant than the other skunks dwelling in North America.

In addition to performing a handstand before spraying a potential predator, the skunk also performs foot stamping, which involves the skunk stamping its feet on the ground in order to warn an approaching predator. The stamping can be heard for several meters away and is usually followed by the skunk spraying its odorous secretion. When these skunks encounter an egg that they want to eat they will straddle the egg with their front legs and bite the egg open. If this fails they will then proceed to use their front legs to push the egg back and kick it with one of their hind legs.

== Breeding ==
Eastern spotted skunks usually breed in March or April and give birth in late May or early June. On average the female skunk gives birth to 4–5 baby skunks (kits) at a time. It takes twelve weeks before newborn skunks will become fully developed into adult skunks and two months before they develop skunk musk to use as self-defense.

== Conservation ==
The eastern spotted skunk has seen sharp declines in populations from several states, particularly those in the Midwest (such as Minnesota and Wisconsin). The exact reason behind the decrease in numbers is not known, which is puzzling considering the species was very quick to adapt to human settlement, and was commonly trapped up until the second half of the 20th century. Before then, they were frequently seen on farmlands, and were known to dig burrows under the sides of barns and prey on mice that were attracted to stored grains. In Minnesota, after a peak in the number of reported trapped specimens in the mid-1940s, with approximately 19,400 spotted skunks taken in 1946 alone, yearly reports of trapped spotted skunks sharply fell. Pesticide use, modernization of farming techniques, over-trapping and consolidation of barns and other man-made structures are all believed to have had a negative effect on eastern spotted skunk populations; as a result, it has become possibly eradicated from several midwestern states, and on the whole is declining in that region. It is also declining in parts of the eastern US, such as Pennsylvania. Where it is not declining, the eastern spotted skunk is uncommon, although it remains common in Southern Florida. According to a population survey done in Alabama, the Carolinas, and Virginia, the Appalachian spotted skunk (S. p. putorius), the nominate subspecies, underwent a decline of about 3% per year between 2014 and 2020, with about a 50% mortality rate; predation from owls constituted the main reason for mortality throughout most of the range, but in North Carolina, a canine distemper outbreak killed half the marked (and a few unmarked) individuals over a few days.
