= E. giganteus =

E. giganteus may refer to:

- Edestus giganteus, the scissor-tooth shark, an extinct shark species that lived in the oceans during the Late Carboniferous
- Equus giganteus, the giant prehistoric horse native to North America during the Pleistocene
- Erythrochiton giganteus, a plant species endemic to Ecuador
- Esacus giganteus, the beach stone-curlew or beach thick-knee, a large ground-dwelling bird found in Australasia
- Eubrontes giganteus, the name of fossilised dinosaur footprints dating from the Late Triassic
