= Schistophoron aurantiacum =

Scientific classification
- Kingdom: Fungi
- Division: Ascomycota
- Class: Lecanoromycetes
- Order: Graphidales
- Family: Graphidaceae
- Genus: Schistophoron
- Species: S. aurantiacum

Binomial name
- Schistophoron aurantiacum Aptroot & Sipman (2007)

Species of lichen

Schistophoron aurantiacum is a species of corticolous (bark-dwelling) lichen in the family Graphidaceae. Found in Costa Rica, it was formally described as a new species in 2007 by lichenologists André Aptroot and Harrie Sipman. The type specimen was collected by the second author from Carara National Park (Puntarenas Province), where it was found along a stream in a partly disturbed primary forest dominated by an understory of the shrub Erythrochiton gymnanthus.

The lichen has an orange-tinged, white thallus with an orange-brown prothallus. Its ascomata are in the form of short lirellae with carbonised walls. Its ascospores are ellipsoid with a single septum, and measure 10–12 by 5–7 μm. Schistophoron aurantiacum contains lichexanthone, a lichen product that causes the thallus to fluoresce yellow when lit with a long-wavelength UV light. The orange colouring of the thallus results from an anthraquinone compound that has a K+ (deep violet red) chemical spot test. This species is the only one in genus Schistophoron with either lichexanthone or an anthraquinone.
