= Ichthyology & Herpetology =

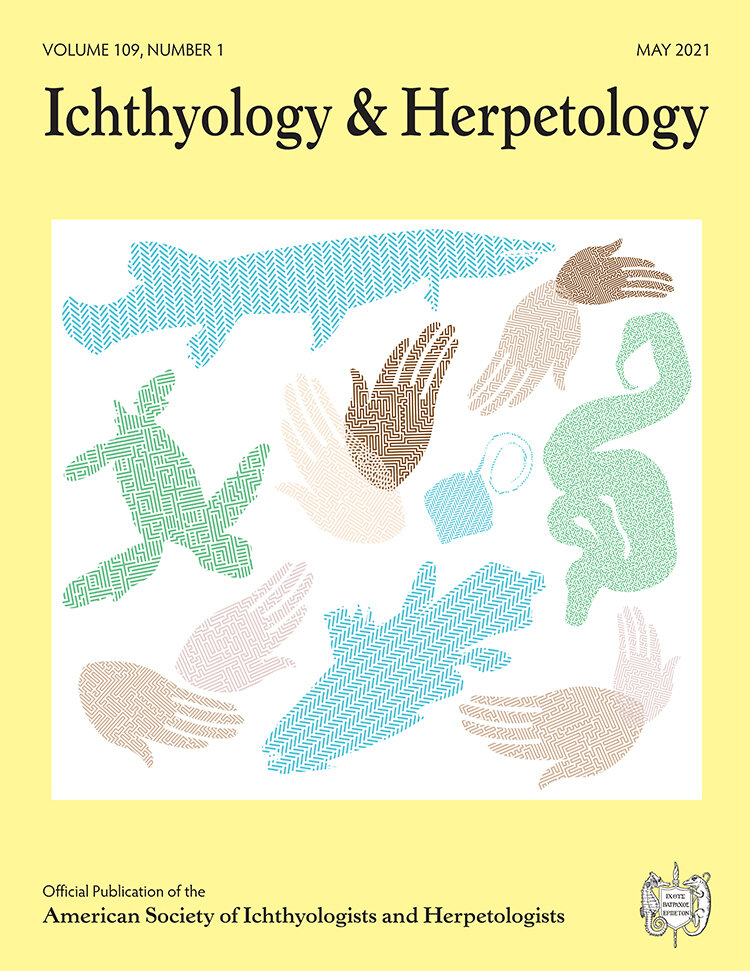
- Cover of the May 2021 issue
- Discipline: Ichthyology and Herpetology
- Language: English
- Edited by: William Leo Smith

Publication details
- Former name: Copeia
- History: 1913–present
- Publisher: American Society of Ichthyologists and Herpetologists (United States)
- Frequency: Quarterly
- Impact factor: 1.857 (2021)

Standard abbreviations
- ISO 4: Ichthyol. Herpetol.

Indexing
- CODEN: COPAAR
- ISSN: 0045-8511 (print); 1938-5110 (web)
- LCCN: a43003155
- JSTOR: 00458511
- OCLC no.: 01565060

Links
- Journal homepage; Online access; Online archive; Ichthyology & Herpetology supplemental material website

Ichthyology & Herpetology (formerly Copeia) is a quarterly peer-reviewed scientific journal covering research in ichthyology and herpetology that was originally named after Edward Drinker Cope, a prominent American researcher in these fields. It is the official journal of the American Society of Ichthyologists and Herpetologists. According to the Journal Citation Reports, Copeia has a 2021 impact factor of 1.857, ranking it 65th out of 176 journals in the category "Zoology".

== History ==
On December 27, 1913, John Treadwell Nichols published the first issue of Copeia. This issue consisted of a single piece of paper folded to form four pages of information with five articles. The cover of the pamphlet bore the inscription: "Published by the contributors to advance the science of coldblooded vertebrates." In 2020, the American Society of Ichthyologists and Herpetologists voted to rename the journal, Ichthyology & Herpetology.

=== Name change ===
The journal was named after Edward Drinker Cope, a renowned 19th century herpetologist, naturalist, and paleontologist, who identified thousands of vertebrate species. In 2020, members of the Society raised the issue that the name of the journal be changed because Cope, a staunch Lamarckian, flaunted his views on race and women, which were undeniably offensive even during his Civil War-era lifetime: Cope's younger friend and colleague Charles R. Knight is on record for describing Cope as having "the filthiest mouth" among all his acquaintances.

The editor of the journal, W. Leo Smith, formally recommended the change of the journal's name on June 29, 2020, to the Society's Board of Governors. The American Society of Ichthyologists and Herpetologists' Executive Committee and Board of Governors voted to change the name of the journal on July 2, 2020. The journal was renamed Ichthyology & Herpetology in early 2021. On March 19, 2021, the first three articles of Ichthyology & Herpetology were published online. These three articles covered the history, context, and reasons for the name change, including an introduction from the journal's editor, an interview with the individuals voicing concerns about the name of the journal, and an essay (The Exact and Very Strange Truth) by the author, John Nichols, who is a grandson of the journal's founder, John Treadwell Nichols.
