= Schistophoron muriforme =

Scientific classification
- Kingdom: Fungi
- Division: Ascomycota
- Class: Lecanoromycetes
- Order: Graphidales
- Family: Graphidaceae
- Genus: Schistophoron
- Species: S. muriforme

Binomial name
- Schistophoron muriforme Weerakoon & Aptroot (2016)

Species of lichen

Schistophoron muriforme is a species of corticolous (bark-dwelling), crustose lichen in the family Graphidaceae, first described in 2016. Found in Sri Lanka, it is characterised by its pale yellowish-white thallus and muriform ascospores.

== Taxonomy ==
Schistophoron muriforme was formally described by the lichenologists Gothamie Weerakoon and André Aptroot in 2016. The type specimen was collected in Morningside, Sri Lanka, on the bark of a tree in April 2015.

Schistophoron muriforme is the only member of Schistophoron that has muriform ascospores and produces the substance psoromic acid.

== Description ==
The thallus of Schistophoron muriforme is crustose, continuous, not corticate, dull, and pale yellowish-white, surrounded by a usually diffuse brown prothallus. The algal partner (photobiont) in this lichen is trentepohlioid. Ascomata are sessile, lirelliform or ellipsoidal or branched. They are about 0.3–0.5 mm wide, 0.3–0.4 mm high, and 0.7–1.5 mm long, and have a margin that is white and about 0.2 mm wide. The excipulum is pale brown, and the hypothecium is hyaline. The hamathecium is not inspersed and hyaline, with paraphysoids 2–2.5 μm wide, and the area above the hamathecium is completely filled with mazaedium. Ascospores are brown, muriform, 3–7 by 2–4-septate, spherical to ellipsoid, measuring 15–30 by 15–18 μm, with rounded lumina. Pycnidia were not observed to occur in this species.

The reaction of the thallus of Schistophoron muriforme to standard chemical spot tests is UV−, C−, K−, KC−, and Pd+ (yellow). Thin-layer chromatography analysis detected psoromic acid.

== Distribution and habitat ==
This species is found on trees in wet tropical mountain forests and is only known to occur in Sri Lanka.
