= Erythrochiton hypophyllanthus =

Conservation status
- Near Threatened (IUCN 3.1)

Scientific classification
- Kingdom: Plantae
- Clade: Tracheophytes
- Clade: Angiosperms
- Clade: Eudicots
- Clade: Rosids
- Order: Sapindales
- Family: Rutaceae
- Genus: Erythrochiton
- Species: E. hypophyllanthus

Binomial name
- Erythrochiton hypophyllanthus Planch. & Linden

Species of flowering plant

Erythrochiton hypophyllanthus is a species of flowering plant in the family Rutaceae. It is a rainforest tree endemic to Colombia. It is noteworthy for its flowers, which are about 5 cm (2.0 in) wide and are borne on the underside of the leaves, attached to the midrib almost exactly in the center of the blade (lamina).
