= Schistophoron =

Scientific classification
- Kingdom: Fungi
- Division: Ascomycota
- Class: Lecanoromycetes
- Order: Graphidales
- Family: Graphidaceae
- Genus: Schistophoron; Stirt. (1876)

Type species
- Schistophoron tenue Stirt. (1876)

Species
- S. aurantiacum S. indicum S. muriforme S. tenue S. variabile

Genus of lichen-forming fungi

Schistophoron is a genus of lichen-forming fungi in the family Graphidaceae. It comprises five species. Established in 1876 by the Scottish naturalist James Stirton, these unusual lichens grow exclusively on the undersides of living leaves in tropical rainforests, forming thin grey-green crusts with small slit-like fruiting structures. Found across the tropics from the Americas to Africa and Southeast Asia, they serve as indicators of undisturbed forest conditions due to their sensitivity to canopy opening and changes in humidity.

== Taxonomy ==
The genus was circumscribed in 1876 by the Scottish physician and naturalist James Stirton. In his original description, Stirton characterized Schistophoron by its pale grey, powdery thallus and distinctive wart-like apothecia that are at first enclosed and whitish-mealy. He regarded the genus as allied to Tylophoron, but distinguished it by its elongated thread-like apothecia and spore characters, bearing nearly the same relationship to Chiodecton as the sessile forms of Tylophoron do to Thelotrema. The type material was collected from smooth bark near Bonny River in West Africa.

For much of its history, the genus had an uncertain systematic position, and was placed by some authors in Cypheliaceae of the Caliciales. A molecular phylogenetic study published in 2009 helped clarify its affinities using combined nrLSU and mtSSU ribosomal DNA data from Schistophoron tenue. Anders Tehler and coauthors found that the genus belongs in the subclass Ostropomycetidae, with analyses indicating placement in the order Graphidales and suggesting affinity with the family Graphidaceae, although support for the latter relationship was weak and the authors considered its exact position within the order to require further study. The study also supported earlier morphological suspicions that Schistophoron did not belong among the calicioid lichens where it had long been placed, but instead represents a case of convergent evolution in traits associated with passive spore dispersal and mazaedium formation.

== Description ==
Schistophoron forms a very thin, smooth grey-green crust (thallus) on the surface of living leaves; it has no true cortex and follows every wrinkle of the lamina. The fruit bodies begin as minute cracks in the thallus and soon widen into short, mostly straight lirellae (0.3–1.2 mm) that occur singly or in loose star-bursts of two to six rays. Their walls are pale to light brown rather than fully carbonised (blackened and charcoal-like), so the slits do not stand out as starkly as in many bark-dwelling script lichens. A colourless excipulum lines each slit, topped by a faint yellow-brown epithecium free of pruina. The hymenium is clear and non-inspersed, while the thin-walled, Graphis-type asci usually contain eight hyaline ascospores that are 1–3-septate, relatively small (about 10–25 × 3–6 μm) and iodine-negative (I–). No lichen substances have been detected by thin-layer chromatography, a useful point of distinction from many chemically richer Graphidaceae.

The combination of leaf-dwelling habit, pale or only lightly carbonised lirellae, an inspersion-free hymenium and small, thin-walled, I– spores separates Schistophoron from superficially similar genera. Foliicolous Chroodiscus has star-shaped discs instead of slits; Chapsa and Astrochapsa possess branched paraphyses and often produce depsidone compounds; whereas the bark-dwelling Sarcographa and Sarcographina have thick black margins and much larger, muriform spores.

== Ecology ==
All known species of Schistophoron are strictly foliicolous, colonising the shaded lower surfaces of evergreen leaves in humid lowland and premontane rain-forests across the Neotropics, Africa and South-east Asia. Because leaves are short-lived compared with bark, these lichens are adapted to rapid maturation and spore release, completing their life cycle in a year or two before the substrate is shed. They disappear quickly when canopy opening or prolonged drought reduces ambient humidity, so their presence is often taken as a signal of intact, moisture-rich understory conditions in undisturbed tropical forest.

== Species ==
As of June 2025, Species Fungorum (in the Catalogue of Life) accept five species of Schistophoron:

- Schistophoron aurantiacum Aptroot & Sipman (2007)
- Schistophoron indicum Kr.P.Singh & Swarnal. (2011)
- Schistophoron muriforme Weerakoon & Aptroot (2016)
- Schistophoron tenue Stirt. (1876)
- Schistophoron variabile Tibell (1982)
