= Schistophoron indicum =

Scientific classification
- Kingdom: Fungi
- Division: Ascomycota
- Class: Lecanoromycetes
- Order: Graphidales
- Family: Graphidaceae
- Genus: Schistophoron
- Species: S. indicum

Binomial name
- Schistophoron indicum Kr.P.Singh & Swarnal. (2011)

Species of lichen-forming fungus

Schistophoron indicum is a species of corticolous (bark-dwelling) crustose lichen in the family Graphidaceae. Found in India, it was formally described as a new species in 2011. It is distinguished by its elongated, slit-like fruiting bodies that contain a powdery spore mass, and by its dark brown ascospores, which are broadly oval to nearly round in shape, divided into two to four cells, have smooth walls, and are relatively small in size.
