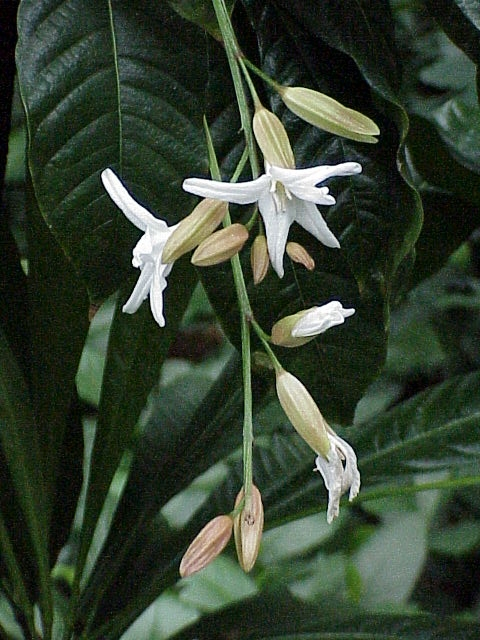
- Erythrochiton brasiliensis

Scientific classification
- Kingdom: Plantae
- Clade: Tracheophytes
- Clade: Angiosperms
- Clade: Eudicots
- Clade: Rosids
- Order: Sapindales
- Family: Rutaceae
- Subfamily: Zanthoxyloideae
- Genus: Erythrochiton; Nees & Mart.

= Erythrochiton =

Genus of flowering plants

Erythrochiton is a genus of plant in family Rutaceae. It contains the following species (but this list may be incomplete):

- Erythrochiton brasiliensis Nees & Mart.
- Erythrochiton delitescens Morton
- Erythrochiton fallax Kallunki
- Erythrochiton giganteus Kaastra & A.H.Gentry
- Erythrochiton gymnanthus Kallunki
- Erythrochiton hypophyllanthus Planch. & Linden
- Erythrochiton lindenii Planch. & Linden
- Erythrochiton macrophyllum Makoy ex Hook.
- Erythrochiton macropodum K.Krause
- Erythrochiton odontoglossus Kallunki
- Erythrochiton trichanthus Kallunki
- Erythrochiton trifoliatum Pilg.

Many species of this genus are characterised by having epiphyllous flowers, which emerge from the leaf itself, rather than the more usual site of a leaf axil, a plant axis, or its inflorescence.
