= Edward Drinker Cope =

American paleontologist and biologist (1840–1897)

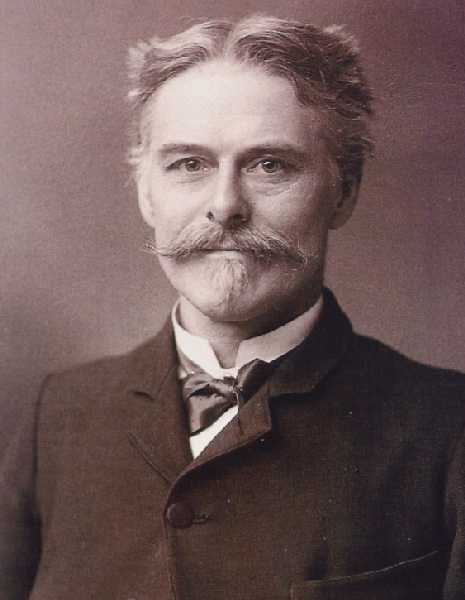
- Portrait of Cope, c. 1895
- Born: July 28, 1840; Philadelphia, Pennsylvania, U.S.
- Died: April 12, 1897 (aged 56); Philadelphia, Pennsylvania, U.S.
- Education: University of Pennsylvania
- Known for: Bone Wars
- Spouse: Annie Pim (m. 1865)
- Children: Julia Biddle Cope
- Awards: Bigsby Medal (1879); Hayden Memorial Geological Award (1891)
- Scientific career
- Fields: Paleontology, zoology, herpetology
- Workplaces: United States Geological Survey; Haverford College; University of Pennsylvania

Edward Drinker Cope (July 28, 1840 – April 12, 1897) was an American zoologist, paleontologist, comparative anatomist, herpetologist, and ichthyologist. Born to a wealthy Quaker family, he distinguished himself as a child prodigy interested in science, publishing his first scientific paper at the age of 19. Though his father tried to raise Cope as a gentleman farmer, he eventually acquiesced to his son's scientific aspirations.

Cope had little formal scientific training, and he eschewed a teaching position for field work. He made regular trips to the American West, prospecting in the 1870s and 1880s, often as a member of U.S. Geological Survey teams. A personal feud between Cope and paleontologist Othniel Charles Marsh led to a period of intense fossil-finding competition now known as the Bone Wars. Cope's financial fortunes soured after failed mining ventures in the 1880s, forcing him to sell off much of his fossil collection. He experienced a resurgence in his career toward the end of his life.

Though Cope's scientific pursuits nearly bankrupted him, his contributions helped to define the field of American paleontology. He was a prodigious writer with 1,400 papers published over his lifetime, although his rivals debated the accuracy of his rapidly published works. He discovered, described, and named more than 1,000 vertebrate species, including hundreds of fishes and dozens of dinosaurs.

== Biography ==
=== Early life ===
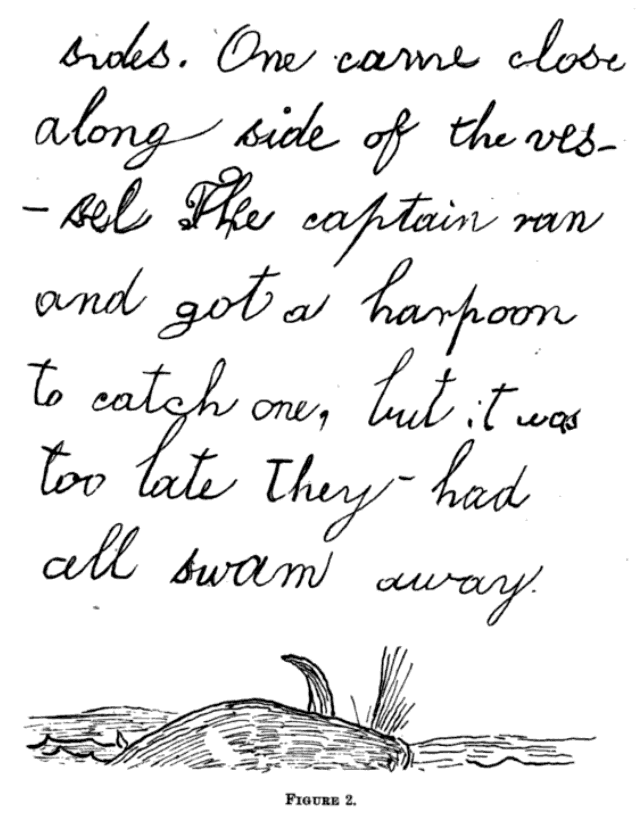
Cope was taken on a sea trip to Boston one week after his seventh birthday. His notebook survives, including this page, and contains notes and drawings of his travels.

Edward Drinker Cope was born on July 28, 1840, the eldest son of Alfred and Hanna Cope. The death of his mother when he was three years old seemed to have had little effect on young Edward, as he mentioned in his letters that he had no recollection of her. His stepmother Rebecca Biddle filled the maternal role; Cope referred to her warmly, as well as his younger stepbrother, James Biddle Cope. Alfred, an orthodox member of the Religious Society of Friends or Quakers, operated a lucrative shipping business started by his father Thomas P. Cope in 1821. He was a philanthropist who gave money to the Society of Friends, the Philadelphia Zoological Gardens and the Institute for Colored Youth.

Edward was born and raised in a large stone house called "Fairfield", whose location is now within the boundaries of Philadelphia. The 8 acres (3.2 ha) of pristine and exotic gardens of the house offered a landscape that Edward was able to explore. The Copes began teaching their children to read and write while very young, and took Edward on trips across New England and to museums, zoos, and gardens. Cope's interest in animals became apparent at a young age, as did his natural artistic ability.

Alfred intended to give his son the same education he himself had received. At age nine, Edward was sent to a day school in Philadelphia; at 12, he attended the Friends' Boarding School at Westtown, near West Chester, Pennsylvania. The school was founded in 1799 with fundraising by members of the Society of Friends (Quakers), and provided much of the Cope family's education. The prestigious school was expensive, costing Alfred $500 in tuition each year, and in his first year, Edward studied algebra, chemistry, scripture, physiology, grammar, astronomy, and Latin. Edward's letters home requesting a larger allowance show he was able to manipulate his father, and he was, according to author and Cope biographer Jane Davidson, "a bit of a spoiled brat". His letters suggest he was lonely at the school—it was the first time he had been away from his home for an extended period. Otherwise, Edward's studies progressed much like a typical boy—he consistently had "less than perfect" or "not quite satisfactory" marks for conduct from his teachers, and did not work hard on his penmanship lessons, which may have contributed to his often-illegible handwriting as an adult.

Edward returned to Westtown in 1855, accompanied by two of his sisters. Biology began to interest him more that year, and he studied natural history texts in his spare time. While at the school, he frequently visited the Academy of Natural Sciences in Philadelphia. Edward often obtained bad marks due to quarreling and bad conduct. His letters to his father show he chafed at farm work and betrayed flashes of the temper for which he would later become well known. After sending Edward back to the farm for summer break in 1854 and 1855, Alfred did not return Edward to school after spring 1856. Instead, Alfred attempted to turn his son into a gentleman farmer, which he considered a wholesome profession that would yield enough profit to lead a comfortable life, and improve the undersized Edward's health. (Note: Davidson found no evidence in any of the surviving Cope correspondence and papers that Alfred intended Edward to become part of his shipping business. She attributes Alfred's resistance to Edward's desire for a scientific career to "old-fashionedness" (Davidson, 25).) Until 1863, Cope's letters to his father continually expressed his yearning for a more professional scientific career than that of a farmer, which he called "dreadfully boring".

While working on farms, Edward continued his education on his own. In 1858, he began working part-time at the Academy of Natural Sciences, reclassifying and cataloguing specimens, and published his first series of research results in January 1859. Cope began taking French and German classes with a former Westtown teacher. Though Alfred resisted his son's pursuit of a science career, he paid for his son's private studies. Instead of working the farm his father bought for him, Edward rented out the land and used the income to further his scientific endeavors.

Alfred finally gave in to Edward's wishes and paid for university classes. Cope attended the University of Pennsylvania in the 1861 and/or 1862 academic years, (Note: The exact dates of Cope's studies at the University of Pennsylvania are not known. Cope kept his admission slip for the 1861–1862 school year his entire life, but assuming that these slips were collected by university professors this would suggest he never attended in the fall of 1861 (Davidson, 20).) studying comparative anatomy under Joseph Leidy, one of the most influential anatomists and paleontologists at the time. Cope asked his father to pay for a tutor in German and French to allow him to read scholarly works in those languages. During this period, he had a job recataloging the herpetological collection at the Academy of Natural Sciences, where he became a member at Leidy's urging. Cope visited the Smithsonian Institution on occasion, where he became acquainted with Spencer Baird, who was an expert in the fields of ornithology and ichthyology. In 1861, he published his first paper on Salamandridae classification; over the next five years he published primarily on reptiles and amphibians. Cope's membership in the Academy of Natural Sciences and American Philosophical Society gave him outlets to publish and announce his work; many of his early paleontological works were published by the Philosophical Society.

=== European travels ===
In 1863 and 1864, during the American Civil War, Cope traveled through Europe, taking the opportunity to visit the most esteemed museums and societies of the time. Initially, he seemed interested in helping out at a field hospital, but in letters to his father later on in the war, this aspiration seemed to disappear; instead he considered working in the American South to assist freed African Americans. Davidson suggests Cope's correspondence with Leidy and Ferdinand Hayden, who worked as field surgeons during the war, might have informed Cope of the horrors of the occupation. Edward was involved in a love affair; his father did not approve. Whether Edward or the unnamed woman (whom he at one point intended to marry) broke off the relationship is unknown, but he took the breakup poorly. Biographer and paleontologist Henry Fairfield Osborn attributed Edward's sudden departure for Europe as a method of keeping him from being drafted into the Civil War. Cope did write to his father from London on February 11, 1864, "I shall get home in time to catch and be caught by the new draft. I shall not be sorry for this, as I know certain persons who would be mean enough to say that I have gone to Europe to avoid the war." Eventually, Cope took the pragmatic approach and waited out the conflict. He may have suffered from mild depression during this period, and often complained of boredom. (Note: Davidson writes that "[it may] seem to the reader, as it does the author, that Cope could have suffered some mild depression". She points to evidence including his letters where he complains of boredom, as well as betraying insights into the discrepancy between how he saw himself and how his colleagues described him (Davidson, 29).)

Despite his torpor, Edward proceeded with his tour of Europe, and met with some of the most highly esteemed scientists of the world during his travels through France, Germany, Great Britain, Ireland, Austria, Italy, and Eastern Europe, most likely with introductory letters from Leidy and Spencer Baird. In the winter of 1863, Edward met Othniel Charles Marsh while in Berlin. Marsh, age 32, was attending the University of Berlin. He held two university degrees in comparison to Edward's lack of formal schooling past 16, but Edward had written 37 scientific papers in comparison to Marsh's two published works. While they would later become rivals, the two men appeared to take a liking to each other upon meeting. Marsh led Edward on a tour of the city, and they stayed together for days. After Edward left Berlin, the two maintained correspondence, exchanging manuscripts, fossils, and photographs. Edward burned many of his journals and letters from Europe upon his return to the United States. Friends intervened and stopped Cope from destroying some of his drawings and notes, in what author Url Lanham deemed a "partial suicide".

=== Family and early career ===
When Cope returned to Philadelphia in 1864, his family made every effort to secure him a teaching post as the Professor of Zoology at Haverford College, a small Quaker school where the family had philanthropic ties. The college awarded him an honorary master's degree so he could have the position. Cope even began to think about marriage and consulted his father in the matter, telling him of the girl he would like to marry: "an amiable woman, not over sensitive, with considerable energy, and especially one inclined to be serious and not inclined to frivolity and display—the more truly Christian of course the better—seems to be the most practically the most suitable for me, though intellect and accomplishments have more charm." Cope thought of Annie Pim, a member of the Society of Friends, as less a lover than companion, declaring, "her amiability and domestic qualities generally, her capability of taking care of a house, etc., as well as her steady seriousness weigh far more with me than any of the traits which form the theme of poets!" Cope's family approved of his choice, and the marriage took place in July 1865 at Pim's farmhouse in Chester County, Pennsylvania. The two had a single daughter, Julia Biddle Cope, born June 10, 1866. Cope's return to the United States also marked an expansion of his scientific studies; in 1864, he described several fishes, a whale, and the amphibian Amphibamus grandiceps (his first paleontological contribution).

During the period between 1866 and 1867, Cope went on trips to western parts of the country. He related to his father his scientific experiences; to his daughter he sent descriptions of animal life as part of her education. Cope found educating his students at Haverford "a pleasure", but wrote to his father that he "could not get any work done." He resigned from his position at Haverford and moved his family to Haddonfield, in part to be closer to the fossil beds of western New Jersey. Due to the time-consuming nature of his Haverford position, Cope had not had time to attend to his farm and had let it out to others, but eventually found he was in need of more money to fuel his scientific habits. Pleading with his father for money to pursue his career, he finally sold the farm in 1869. Alfred apparently did not press his son to continue farming, and Edward focused on his scientific career. He continued his continental travels, including trips to Virginia, Tennessee, and North Carolina. He visited caves across the region. He stopped these cave explorations after an 1871 trip to the Wyandotte Caves in Indiana, but remained interested in the subject. Cope had visited Haddonfield many times in the 1860s, paying periodic visits to the marl pits. The fossils he found in these pits became the focus of several papers, including a description in 1868 of Elasmosaurus platyurus and Laelaps. Marsh accompanied him on one of these excursions. Cope's proximity to the beds after moving to Haddonfield made more frequent trips possible. The Copes lived comfortably in a frame house backed by an apple orchard. Two maids tended the estate, which entertained a number of guests. Cope's only concern was for more money to spend on his scientific work.

The 1870s were the golden years of Cope's career, marked by his most prominent discoveries and rapid flow of publications. Among his descriptions were the therapsid Lystrosaurus (1870), the archosauromorph Champsosaurus (1876), and the sauropod Amphicoelias (1878). In the period of one year, from 1879 to 1880, Cope published 76 papers based on his travels through New Mexico and Colorado, and on the findings of his collectors in Texas, Kansas, Oregon, Colorado, Wyoming, and Utah. During the peak years, Cope published around 25 reports and preliminary observations each year. The hurried publications led to errors in interpretation and naming—many of his scientific names were later canceled or withdrawn. In comparison, Marsh wrote and published less frequently and more succinctly—his works appeared in the widely read American Journal of Science, which led to faster reception abroad, and Marsh's reputation grew more rapidly than Cope's.

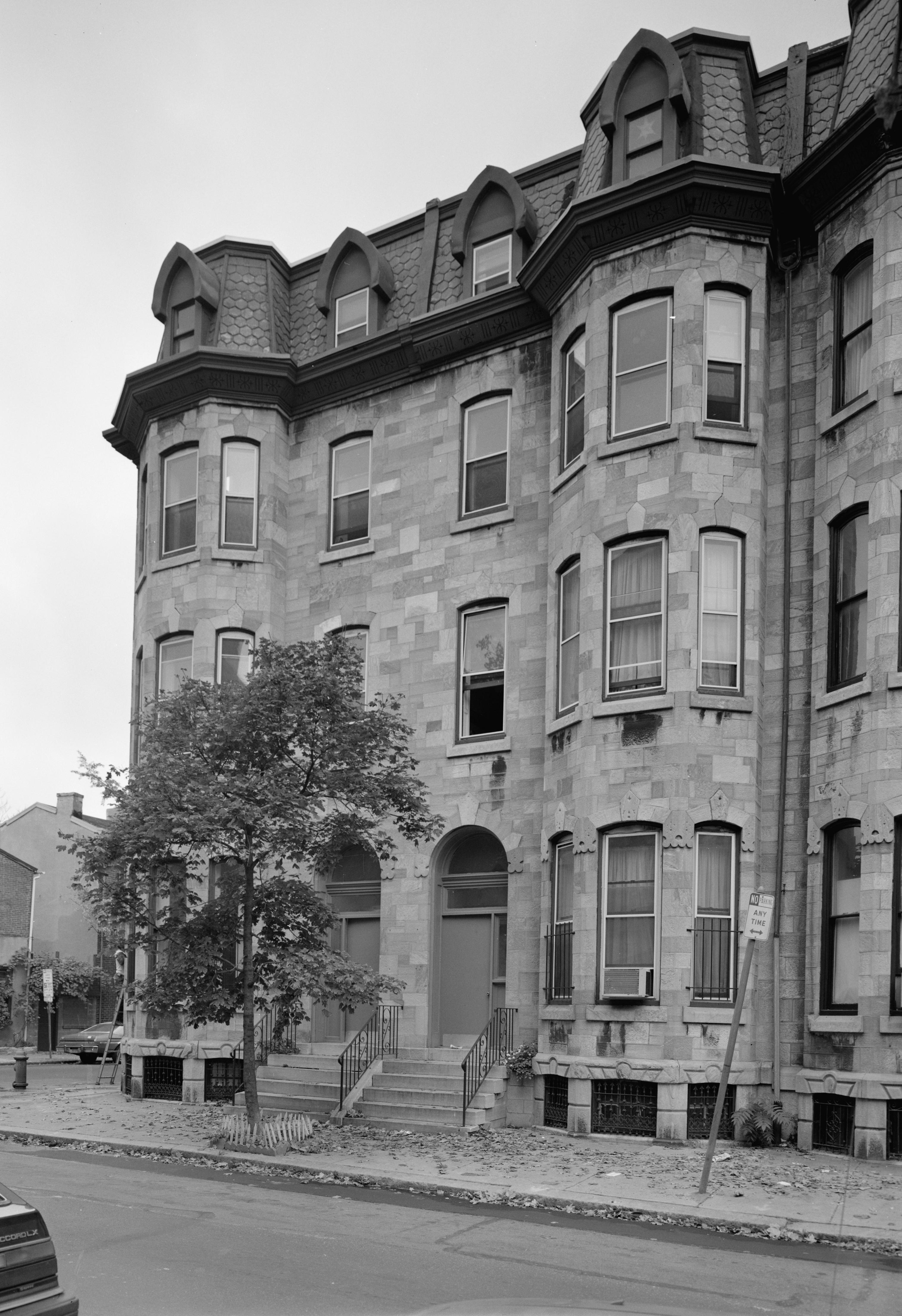
Cope's Pine Street residence

In autumn 1871, Cope began prospecting farther west to the fossil fields of Kansas. Leidy and Marsh had been to the region earlier, and Cope employed one of Marsh's guides, Benjamin Mudge, who was in want of a job. Cope's companion Charles Sternberg described the lack of water and good food available to Cope and his helpers on these expeditions. Cope would suffer from a "severe attack of nightmare" in which "every animal of which we had found trace during the day played with him at night ... sometimes he would lose half the night in this exhausting slumber." Nevertheless, Cope continued to lead the party from sunrise to sunset, sending letters to his wife and child describing his finds. The severe desert conditions and Cope's habit of overworking himself till he was bedridden caught up with him, and in 1872, he broke down from exhaustion. Cope maintained a regular pattern of summers spent prospecting and winters writing up his findings from 1871 to 1879.

Throughout the decade, Cope traveled across the West, exploring rocks of the Eocene in 1872 and the Titanothere Beds of Colorado in 1873. In 1874, Cope was employed with the Wheeler Survey, a group of surveys led by George Montague Wheeler that mapped parts of the United States west of the 100th meridian. The survey traveled through New Mexico, whose Puerco formations, he wrote to his father, provided "the most important find in geology I have ever made". The New Mexico bluffs contained millions of years of formation and subsequent deformation, and were in an area which had not been visited by Leidy or Marsh. Being part of the survey had other advantages; Cope was able to draw on fort commissaries and defray publishing costs. While there was no salary, his findings would be published in the annual reports the surveys printed. Cope brought Annie and Julia along on one such survey, and rented a house for them at Fort Bridger, but he spent more of his own money on these survey trips than he would have liked.

Alfred died December 4, 1875, and left Edward with an inheritance of nearly a quarter of a million dollars. Alfred's death was a blow to Cope; his father was a constant confidant. The same year marked a suspension of much of Cope's field work and a new emphasis on writing up discoveries of the previous years. His chief publication of the time, The Vertebrata of the Cretaceous Formations of the West, was a collection of 303 pages and 54 illustration plates. The memoir summarized his experiences prospecting in New Jersey and Kansas. Cope now had the finances to hire multiple teams to search for fossils for him year-round and he advised the Philadelphia Centennial Exhibition on their fossil displays. Cope's studies of marine reptiles of Kansas closed in 1876, opening a new focus on terrestrial reptiles. The same year, Cope moved from Haddonfield to 2100 and 2102 Pine Street in Philadelphia. He converted one of the two houses into a museum where he stored his growing collection of fossils. Cope's expeditions took him across Kansas, Colorado, New Mexico, Wyoming, and Montana. His initial journey into the Clarendon beds of Upper Miocene and Lower Pliocene of Texas led to an affiliation with the Geological Survey of Texas. Cope's papers on the region constitute some of his most important paleontological contributions. In 1877, he purchased half the rights to the American Naturalist to publish the papers he produced at a rate so high, Marsh questioned their dating. (Note: At one point, Cope deliberately and falsely claimed that a paper on Permian vertebrates had been published three weeks earlier, in part to get back at Marsh, who had heard about Cope's discoveries at a meeting and hurriedly wrote a paper about his own finds while claiming that he was the first to do so (Romer, 204).)

Cope returned to Europe in August 1878 in response to an invitation to join the British Association for the Advancement of Science's Dublin meeting. He was warmly welcomed in England and France, and met with the distinguished paleontologists and archeologists of the period. Marsh's attempts to sully Cope's reputation had made little impact on anyone save paleontologist Thomas Henry Huxley, who according to Osborn, "alone treated [Cope] with coolness". Following the Dublin meeting, Cope spent two days with the French Association for the Advancement of Science. At each gathering, Cope exhibited dinosaur restorations by Philadelphia colleague John A. Ryder and various charts and plates from geological surveys of the 1870s led by Ferdinand Vandeveer Hayden. He returned to London on October 12, meeting with anatomist Richard Owen, ichthyologist Albert Günther, and paleontologist H. G. Seeley. While in Europe, Cope purchased a great collection of fossils from Argentina. Cope never found time to describe the collection and many of the boxes remained unopened until his death.

=== Bone Wars ===
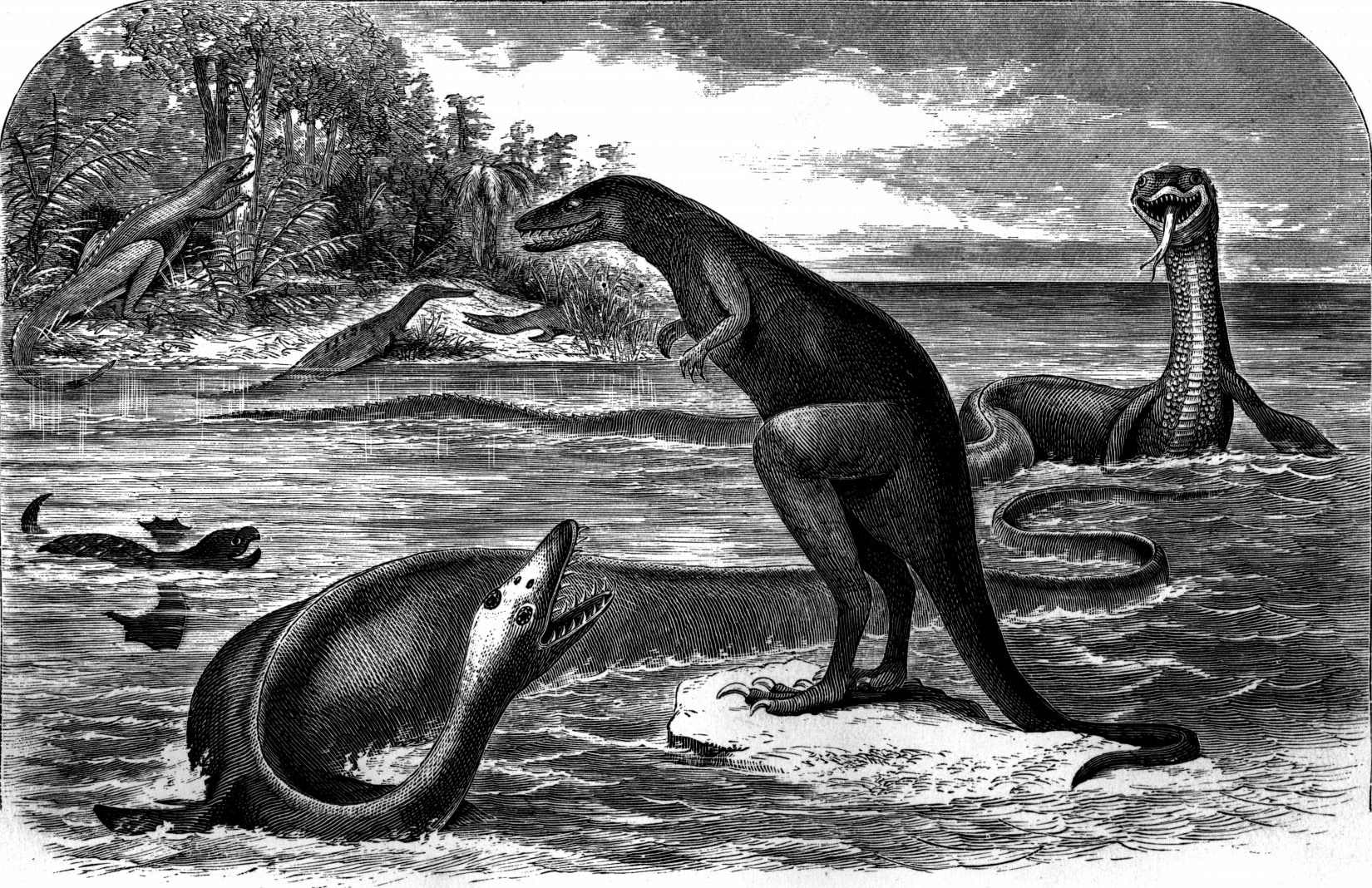
Illustration plate to Cope's 1870 description of several reptiles, including an improperly reconstructed Elasmosaurus (foreground)

Cope's relations with Marsh turned into a competition for fossils between the two, known today as the Bone Wars. The conflict's seeds began upon the men's return to the United States in the 1860s, although Cope named Colosteus marshii for Marsh in 1867, and Marsh returned the favor, naming Mosasaurus copeanus for Cope in 1869. Cope introduced his colleague to the marl pit owner Albert Vorhees when the two visited the site. Marsh went behind Cope's back and made a private agreement with Vorhees: any fossils that Vorhees's men found were sent back to Marsh at New Haven. When Marsh was at Haddonfield examining one of Cope's fossil finds—a complete skeleton of a large aquatic plesiosaur, Elasmosaurus, that had four flippers and a long neck—he commented that the fossil's head was on the wrong end, evidently stating that Cope had put the skull at the end of the vertebrae of the tail. Cope was outraged and the two argued for some time until they agreed to have Leidy examine the bones and determine who was right. Leidy came, picked up the head of the fossil and put it on the other end. Cope was horrified since he had already published a paper on the fossil with the error at the American Philosophical Society. He immediately tried to buy back the copies, but some remained with their buyers (Marsh and Leidy kept theirs). The whole ordeal might have passed easily enough had Leidy not exposed the cover-up at the next society meeting, not to alienate Cope, but only in response to Cope's brief statement where he never admitted he was wrong. Cope and Marsh would never talk to each other amicably again, and by 1873, open hostility had broken out between them.

The rivalry between the two increased towards the latter half of the 1870s. In 1877, Marsh received a letter from Arthur Lakes, a schoolteacher in Golden, Colorado. Lakes had been hiking in the mountains near the town of Morrison with his friend, H. C. Beckwith, looking for fossilized leaves in the Dakota sandstone. Instead, the pair found large bones embedded in the rock. Lakes wrote that the bones were "apparently a vertebra and a humerus bone of some gigantic saurian." While Lakes sent Marsh some 1,500 pounds of bone, he also sent Cope some of the specimens. Marsh published his finds first, and having been paid $100 for the finds Lakes wrote to Cope that the samples should be forwarded to Marsh. Cope was offended by the slight. Meanwhile, Cope received bones from school superintendent O.W. Lucas in March 1877 from Cañon City; the remains were of a dinosaur even bigger than Lakes' that Marsh had described.

Word that Lakes had notified Cope of his finds galvanized Marsh into action. When Marsh heard from Union Pacific Railroad workers W.E. Carlin and W.H. Reed about a vast boneyard northwest of Laramie in Como Bluff, Marsh sent his agent, Samuel Wendell Williston, to take charge of the digging. Cope, in response, learned of Carlin and Reed's discoveries and sent his own men to find bones in the area. The two scientists attempted to sabotage each other's progress. Cope was described as a genius, yet what Marsh lacked in intelligence, he easily made up for in connections—Marsh's uncle was George Peabody, a rich banker who supported Marsh with money, and a secure position at the Peabody Museum. Marsh lobbied John Wesley Powell to act against Cope and attempted to persuade Hayden to "muzzle" Cope's publishing. Both men tried to spy on the other's whereabouts and attempted to offer their collectors more money in the hopes of recruiting them to their own side. Cope was able to recruit David Baldwin in New Mexico and Frank Williston in Wyoming from Marsh. Cope and Marsh were extremely secretive as to the source of their fossils. When Henry Fairfield Osborn, at the time a student at Princeton University, visited Cope to ask where to travel to look for fossils in the West, Cope politely refused to answer.

When Cope arrived back in the United States after his tour of Europe in 1878, he had nearly two years of fossil findings from Lucas. Among these dinosaurs was Camarasaurus, one of the most recognizable dinosaur recreations of the time. The summer of 1879 took Cope to Salt Lake City, San Francisco, and north to Oregon, where he was amazed at the rich flora and the blueness of the Pacific Ocean. In 1879, the United States Congress consolidated the various government survey teams into the United States Geological Survey with Clarence King as its leader. This was discouraging to Cope because King named Marsh, an old college friend, as the chief paleontologist. The period of Cope's and Marsh's paleontological digs in the American West spanned from 1877 to 1892, by which time both men exhausted much of their financial resources.

=== Later years ===
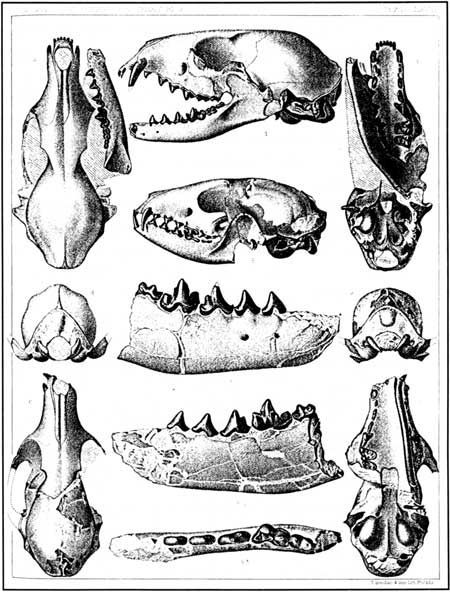
Illustration plate from Cope's The Vertebrata of the Tertiary Formations of the Far West, featuring the skulls of Canidae from the "John Day Epoch" in Oregon

The 1880s proved disastrous for Cope. Marsh's close association with the Geological Survey gave him the resources to employ 54 staff members over the course of ten years. His teaching position at Yale meant he had guaranteed access to the American Journal of Science for publication. Cope had his interest in the Naturalist, but it drained him of funds. After Hayden was removed from the survey, Cope lost his source of government funding. His fortune was not enough to support his rivalry, so Cope invested in mining. Most of his properties were silver mines in New Mexico; one mine yielded an ore vein worth $3 million in silver chloride. Cope visited the mines each summer from 1881 to 1885, taking the opportunity to supervise or collect other minerals. For a while he made good money, but the mines stopped producing and by 1886 he had to give up his now-worthless stocks. The same year he received a teaching position at the University of Pennsylvania. He continued to travel west, but realized he would not be able to best Marsh in cornering the market for bones; he had to release the collectors he had hired and sell his collections. During this period, he published 40 to 75 papers each year. With the failure of his mines, Cope began searching for a job, but was turned down at the Smithsonian and American Museum of Natural History. He turned to giving lectures for hire and writing magazine articles. Each year, he lobbied Congress for an appropriation with which to finish his work on "Cope's Bible", a volume on Tertiary vertebrates, but was continually turned down. Rather than work with Powell and the survey, Cope tried to inflame sentiment against them.

At Marsh's urging, Powell pushed for Cope to return specimens he had unearthed during his employment under the government surveys. This was an outrage to Cope, who had used his own money while working as a volunteer. In response, Cope went to the editor of the New York Herald and promised a scandalous headline. Since 1885, Cope had kept an elaborate journal of mistakes and misdeeds that both Marsh and Powell had committed over the years. From scientific errors to publishing mistakes, he had them written down in a journal he kept in the bottom drawer of his Pine Street desk. Cope sought out Marsh's assistants, who complained of being denied access and credit by their employer and of being chronically underpaid. Reporter William Hosea Ballou ran the first article on January 12, 1890, in what would become a series of newspaper debates between Marsh, Powell, and Cope. Cope attacked Marsh for plagiarism and financial mismanagement, and attacked Powell for his geological classification errors and misspending of government-allocated funds. Marsh and Powell published their own side of the story and, in the end, little changed. No congressional hearing was created to investigate Powell's alleged misallocation of funds, while Cope and Marsh were not held responsible for any mistakes. Indirectly, however, the attacks may have been influential in Marsh's fall from power in the survey. Due to pressure from Powell over bad press, Marsh was removed from his position for the government surveys. Cope's relations with the president of the University of Pennsylvania soured, and the entire funding for paleontology in the government surveys was pulled.

Cope took his sinking fortunes in stride. In writing to Osborn about the articles, he laughed at the outcome, saying, "It will now rest largely with you whether or not I am supposed to be a liar and am actuated by jealousy and disappointment. I think Marsh is impaled on the horns of Monoclonius sphenocerus." Cope was well aware of his enemies and was carefree enough to name a species after a combination of "Cope" and "hater", Anisonchus cophater. Through his years of financial hardship, he was able to continue publishing papers—his most productive years were 1884 and 1885, with 79 and 62 papers published, respectively. The 1880s marked the publication of two of the best-known fossil taxa described by Cope: the pelycosaur Edaphosaurus in 1882 and the early dinosaur Coelophysis in 1889. In 1889, he succeeded Leidy, who had died the previous year, as professor of zoology at the University of Pennsylvania. The small yearly stipend was enough for Cope's family to move back into one of the townhouses he had been forced to relinquish earlier.

In 1892, Cope (then 52 years old) was granted expense money for field work from the Texas Geological Survey. With his finances improved, he was able to publish a massive work on the Batrachians of North America, which was the most detailed analysis and organization of the continent's frogs and amphibians ever mastered, and the 1,115-page The Crocodilians Lizards and Snakes of North America. In the 1890s, his publication rate increased to an average of 43 articles a year. His final expedition to the West took place in 1894, when he prospected for dinosaurs in South Dakota and visited sites in Texas and Oklahoma. The same year, Julia was married to William H. Collins, a Haverford astronomy professor. The couple's ages—Julia was 28 and the groom 35—were past the conventions of Victorian marriage. After their European honeymoon, the couple returned to Haverford. While Annie moved to Haverford, as well, Cope did not. His official reason was the long commute and late lectures he gave in Philadelphia. In private correspondence, however, Osborn wrote that the two had essentially separated, though they remained on amiable terms.

Cope sold his collections to the American Museum of Natural History in 1895; his set of 10,000 American fossil mammals sold for $32,000, lower than Cope's asking price of $50,000. The purchase was financed by the donations from New York's high society. Cope sold three other collections for $29,000. While his collection contained more than 13,000 specimens, Cope's fossil hoard was still much smaller than Marsh's collection, valued at over a million dollars. The University of Pennsylvania bought part of Cope's ethnological artifact collection for $5,500. The Academy of Natural Sciences, Philadelphia's foremost museum, did not bid on any of Cope's sales due to bad blood between Cope and the museum's leaders; as a result, many of Cope's major finds left the city. Cope's proceeds from the sales allowed him to rehire Sternberg to prospect for fossils on his behalf.

=== Death ===
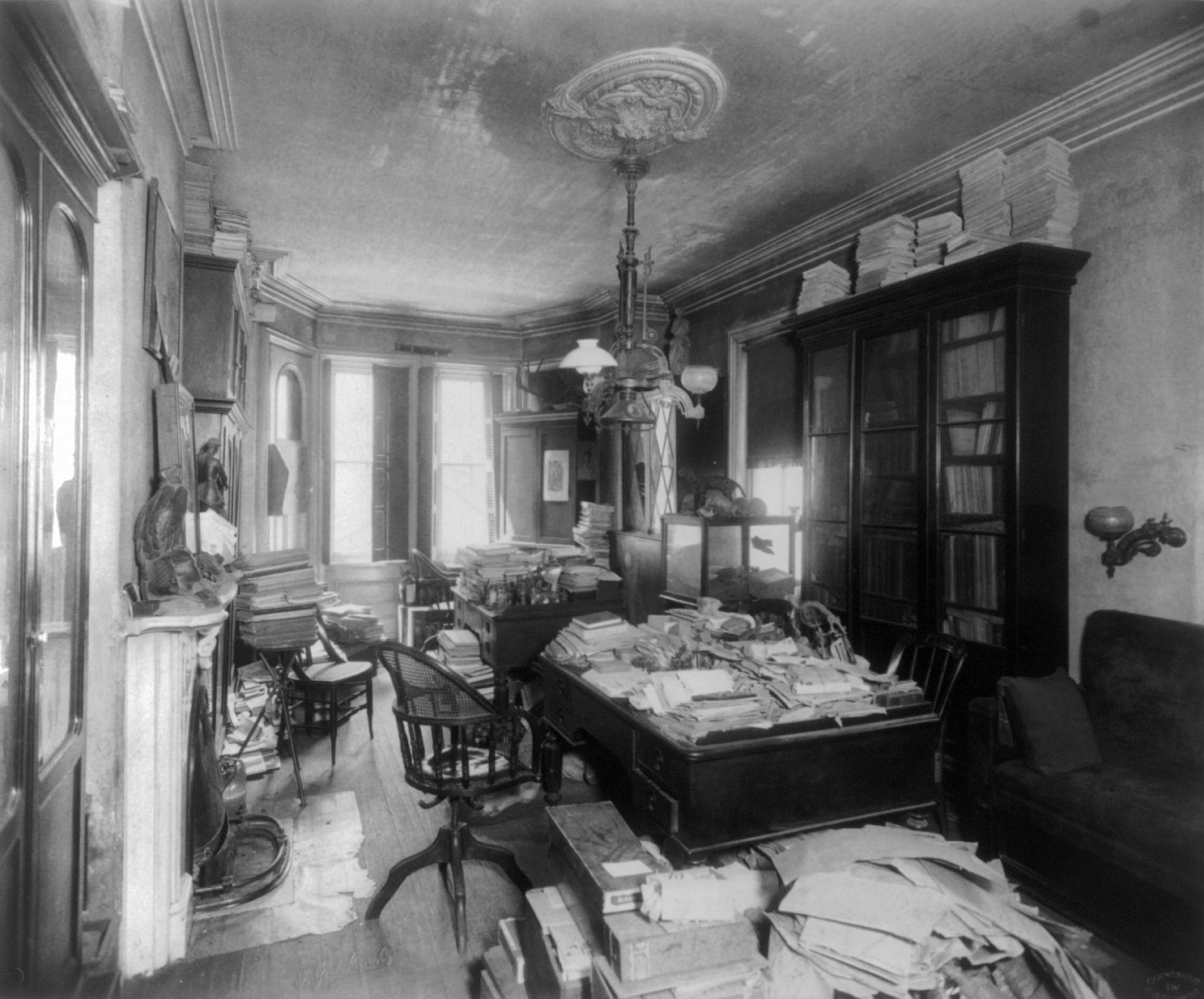
Cope's cluttered study in 1897: The Pine Street home was filled with Cope's papers, bones, stuffed and mounted animals, and specimens preserved in alcohol that covered his desks and an improvised shelf in his bathroom.

In 1896, Cope began suffering from a gastrointestinal illness he said was cystitis. His wife cared for him in Philadelphia when she was able; at other times, Cope's university secretary, Anna Brown, tended to him. Cope at this time lived in his Pine Street museum and rested on a cot surrounded by his fossil finds. Cope often prescribed himself medications, including large amounts of morphine, belladonna, and formalin, a substance based on formaldehyde used to preserve specimens. Osborn was horrified by Cope's actions and made arrangements for surgery, but the plans were put on hold after a temporary improvement in Cope's health. Cope went to Virginia looking for fossils, became ill again, and returned to his home very weak. Osborn visited Cope on April 5, inquiring about Cope's health, but the sick paleontologist pressed his friend for his views on the origin of mammals. Word of Cope's illness spread, and he was visited by friends and colleagues; even in a feverish condition Cope delivered lectures from his bed. Cope died on April 12, 1897, 16 weeks short of his 57th birthday.

Sternberg, still prospecting for Cope that spring, was woken by a liveryman who relayed word from Annie that Cope had died three days earlier. Sternberg wrote in his memoirs, "I had lost friends before, and I had known what it was to bury my own dead, even my firstborn son, but I had never sorrowed more deeply than I did over the news." Cope's Quaker funeral consisted of six men: Osborn, his colleague William Berryman Scott, Cope's friend Persifor Frazer, son-in-law Collins, Horatio Wood, and Harrison Allen. The six sat around Cope's coffin among the fossils and Cope's pets, a tortoise and a Gila monster, for what Osborn called "a perfect Quaker silence ... an interminable length of time." Anticipating the quiet, Osborn had brought along a Bible and read an excerpt from the Book of Job, ending by saying, "These are the problems to which our friend devoted his life."

The coffin was loaded on a hearse and carried to a gathering at Fairfield; much of the gathering was spent in silence. After the coffin was removed, the assembled began talking. Frazer recalled that each person remembered Cope differently, and "Few men succeeded so well in concealing from anyone ... all the sides of his multiform character." Osborn, intending to follow the coffin to the graveyard, was instead pulled aside by Collins and taken to the reading of Cope's will—Osborn and Cope's brother-in-law John Garrett were named executors. Cope gave his family a choice of his books, with the remainder to be sold or donated to the University of Pennsylvania. After debts were handled, Cope left small bequests to friends and family—Anna Brown and Julia received $5,000 each, while the remainder went to Annie. Cope's estate was valued at $75,327, not including additional revenue raised by sales of fossils to the American Museum of Natural History, for a total of $84,600. Some specimens preserved in alcohol made their way to the Academy of Natural Sciences, including a few Gordian worms.

Cope insisted through his will that no graveside service or burial be held; he had donated his body to science. He issued a final challenge to Marsh at his death: he had his skull donated to science so his brain could be measured, hoping his brain would be larger than that of his adversary; at the time, brain size was thought to be the true measure of intelligence. Marsh never accepted the challenge.

Osborn listed Cope's cause of death as uremic poisoning, combined with a large prostate, but the true cause of death is unknown. Many believed Cope had died of syphilis contracted from the women with whom he fraternized during his travels. In 1995, Davidson gained permission to have the skeleton examined by a medical doctor at the university. Dr. Morrie Kricun, a professor of radiology, concluded no evidence of bony syphilis was found on Cope's skeleton.

Public mentions of Cope's death were relatively slight. The Naturalist ran four photographs, a six-page obituary by editor J. S. Kingsley, and a two-page remembrance by Frazer. The National Academy of Sciences' official memoir was submitted years later and written by Osborn. The American Journal of Science devoted six paragraphs to Cope's passing, and incorrectly gave his age as 46. Cope was outlived by his rival Marsh, who was suffering poor health.

== Personality ==
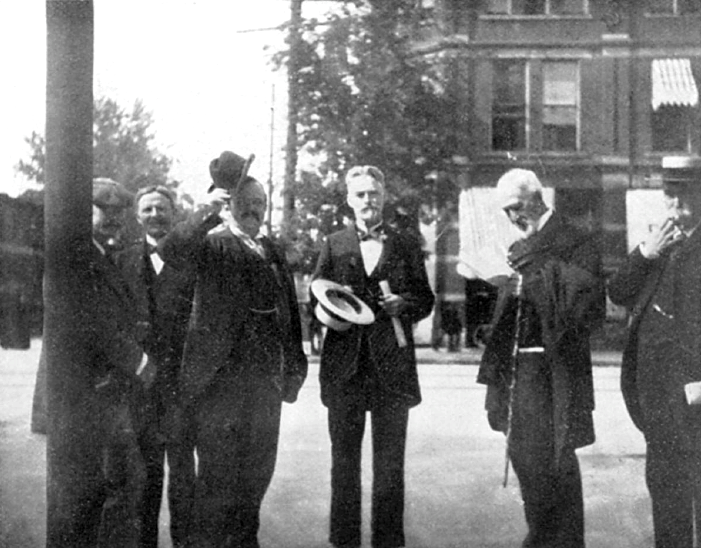
One of the last photographs taken of Cope (third from right), during his attendance at the 1896 American Association for the Advancement of Science meeting in Buffalo

Julia assisted Osborn in writing a biography of her father, titled Cope: Master Naturalist. She would not comment on the name of the woman with whom her father had had an affair prior to his first European travel. Julia is believed to have burned any of the scandalous letters and journals Cope had kept, but many of his friends were able to give their recollections of the scandalous nature of some of Cope's unpublished routines. Charles R. Knight, a former friend, called "Cope's mouth the filthiest, from hearsay that in [Cope's] heyday no woman was safe within five miles of him." As Julia was the major financier behind The Master Naturalist, she wanted to keep her father's name in good standing and refused to comment on any misdeeds her father might have committed.

Cope was described by zoologist Henry Weed Fowler as "a man of medium height and build, but always impressive with his great energy and activity". To him, Fowler wrote, "[Cope] was both genial and always interesting, easily approachable, and both kindly and helpful." His self-taught nature, however, meant that he was largely hostile to bureaucracy and politics. He had a famous temper; one friend called Cope a "militant paleontologist". Despite his faults, he was generally well liked by his contemporaries. American paleontologist Alfred Romer wrote that, "[Cope's] little slips from virtue were those we might make ourselves, were we bolder".

Cope was raised as a Quaker, and was taught that the Bible was literal truth. Although he never confronted his family about their religious views, Osborn writes that Cope was at least aware of the conflict between his scientific career and his religion. Osborn writes: "If Edward harbored intellectual doubts about the literalness of the Bible ... he did not express them in his letters to his family but there can be little question ... that he shared the intellectual unrest of the period." Lanham writes that Cope's religious fervor (which seems to have subsided after his father's death) was embarrassing to even his devout Quaker associates. Biographer Jane Davidson believes that Osborn overstated Cope's internal religious conflicts. She ascribes Cope's deference to his father's beliefs as an act of respect or a measure to retain his father's financial support. Frazer's reminiscences about his friend suggest Cope often told people what they wanted to hear, rather than his true views.

== Views ==
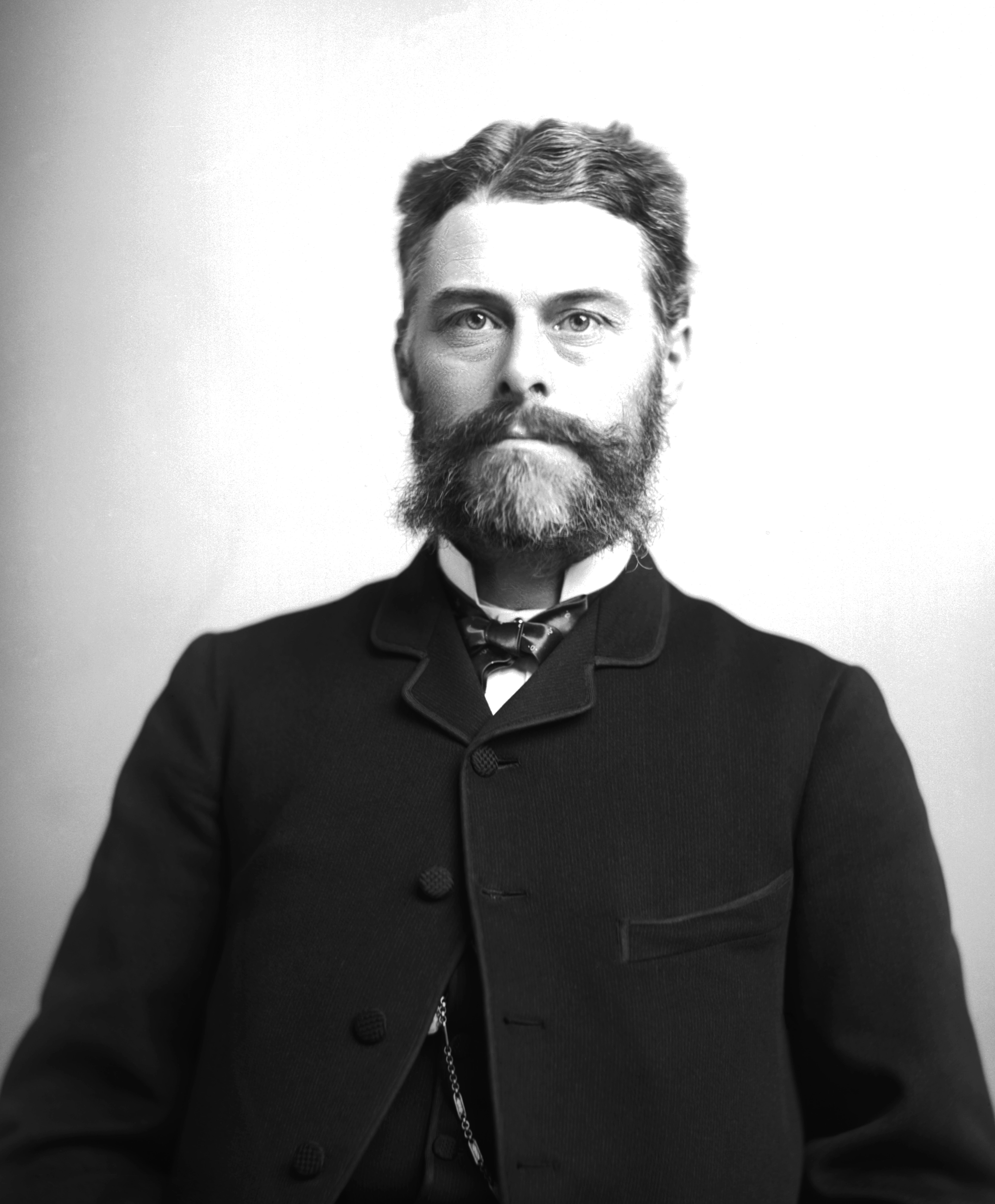
Portrait of Cope, c. 1880

As a young man, Cope read Charles Darwin's Voyage of a Naturalist, which had little effect on him. The only comment about Darwin's book recorded by Cope was that Darwin discussed "too much geology" from the account of his voyage. Due to his background in taxonomy and paleontology, Cope focused on evolution in terms of changing structure, rather than emphasizing geography and variation within populations as Darwin had. Over his lifetime, Cope's views on evolution shifted. His early views held that while Darwin's natural selection may affect the preservation of superficial characteristics in organisms, natural selection alone could not explain the formation of genera. Cope's suggested mechanism for this action was a "steady progressive development of organization" through what Cope termed "a continual crowding backward of the successive steps of individual development". His position later evolved to one with an increased emphasis on continual and utilitarian evolution with less involvement of a Creator. He became one of the founders of the Neo-Lamarckism school of thought, which holds that an individual can pass on traits acquired in its lifetime to offspring. Although the view has been shown incorrect, it was the prevalent theory among paleontologists in Cope's time. In 1887, Cope published his own "Origin of the Fittest: Essays in Evolution", detailing his views on the subject. He was a strong believer in the law of use and disuse—that an individual will slowly, over time, favor an anatomical part of its body so much that it will become stronger and larger as time progresses down the generations. The giraffe, for example, stretched its neck to reach taller trees and passed this acquired characteristic to its offspring in a developmental phase that is added to gestation in the womb.

Cope's Theology of Evolution (1887) argued that consciousness arose from the mind of the universe, which directed animals to new goals and forms. According to Lisa H. Sideris, "[Cope] argued that organisms respond to changes in their environments by an exercise of choice. Consciousness itself, he maintained, was the principal force in evolution. Cope credited God with having built into evolution a life force that propelled organisms toward even higher levels of consciousness."

Cope's views on human races and sex were influenced by his Lamarckian beliefs, which posited those of European ancestry as more highly evolved than nonwhite groups. In his essays on evolution, he assessed the physiognomies of three "sub-species of human"—termed the Negro, the Mongolian, and the Indo-European—in comparison to those of apes and human embryos, and drew the following conclusion:

The Indo-European race is then the highest by virtue of the acceleration of growth in the development of the muscles by which the body is maintained in the erect position (extensors of the leg), and in those important elements of beauty, a well-developed nose and beard. It is also superior in those points in which it is more embryonic than the other races, viz., the want of prominence of the jaws and cheek-bones, since these are associated with a greater predominance of the cerebral part of the skull, increased size of cerebral hemispheres, and greater intellectual power.

He believed that if, "a race was not white then it was inherently more ape-like". He was opposed to blacks because of their "degrading vices", believing that the "inferior Negro should go back to Africa" and that their "poor virtue" was inherent. Cope was against the modern view of women's rights, believing in the husband's role as protector; he was opposed to women's suffrage, as he felt they would be unduly influenced by their husbands, and that it would lead to the retrogression of the race as women took on more "masculine" attributes.

== Legacy ==
In his career, Cope published over 1,400 scientific papers. His major works include three volumes: On the Origin of Genera (1867), The Vertebrata of the Tertiary Formations of the West (1884) and "Essays in Evolution". He discovered a total of 56 new dinosaur species during the Bone Wars compared to Marsh's 80. Although Cope is today known as a herpetologist and paleontologist, his contributions extended to ichthyology, in which he cataloged 300 species of fishes and described over 300 species of reptiles over three decades. In total, he discovered and described over 1,000 species of fossil vertebrates and published 600 separate titles; one species of Caribbean snake, Liophis juliae, he named in honor of his daughter. His proposal for the origin of mammalian molars is notable among his theoretical contributions.

The salamander Dicamptodon copei Nussbaum, 1970, the dinosaur Drinker nisti Bakker et al., 1990, the lizards Alopoglossus copii Boulenger, 1885, Gambelia copeii (Yarrow, 1882), Plestiodon copei (Taylor, 1933), Sepsina copei Bocage, 1873,Sphaerodactylus copei Steindachner, 1867, the snakes Thamnophis copei Dugès, 1879, Aspidura copei Günther, 1864, Cemophora coccinea copei Jan, 1863, Coniophanes imperialis copei Hartweg & J. Oliver, 1938, Dipsas copei Günther, 1872, Cope's gray treefrog Hyla chrysoscelis Cope, 1880, and the splash tetra genus Copella G.S. Myers, 1956 are among the many taxa named in honor of Cope. Currently, 21 fish species named copei are distributed among 11 families. Cope lent his name to the Journal of the American Society of Ichthyologists and Herpetologists (né Copeia) from 1913 to 2020, when the journal was renamed in light of changing attitudes towards Cope's racist views. Cope's Pine Street home is recognized as a national landmark.

Cope's remains are still kept as scientific specimens. His brain was donated to the American Anthropometric Society and is still preserved in alcohol at the Wistar Institute. His skull is at the University of Pennsylvania Museum of Archaeology and Anthropology. His ashes were placed at the institute with those of Leidy, while his bones were extracted and kept in a locked drawer to be studied by anatomy students. (Note: Cope was not alone in donating his brain; poet Walt Whitman did so, as did Powell and Leidy. Cope's brain weighed 1,545 grams, more than those of Powell and Daniel Webster, but less than Leidy's. Whitman's brain had been dropped on the floor and was not measured. Some sources (Psihoyos, 1994) claim that Cope wanted his skeleton to become the Homo sapiens lectotype, but this is refuted by the Academy of Natural Sciences (Spamer, 1999).) In 1907, Edward Anthony Spitzka published a paper of his analysis of six brains at the American Anthropometric Society, including Cope's with additional analysis of Cope's skull. In 1993, the American photographer Louie Psihoyos borrowed Cope's skull and prominently incorporated it into his book Hunting Dinosaurs (1994). Psihoyos and his assistant, John Knoebber, traveled around America with Cope's skull, taking pictures of the skull in different places on the "adventure" and showing it to various modern paleontologists. Among the notable incidents during the journey was Robert T. Bakker pouring pasta into the skull to measure Cope's brain size.

== Selected works ==
- On the Origin of Genera; from the Proceedings of the Academy of Natural Sciences of Philadelphia, Oct. 1868 (Merrihew & Son, 1869)
- The Vertebrata of the Tertiary Formations of the West (Government Printing Office, 1884).
- "The Origin of the Fittest: Essays on Evolution" (Nature, 1887). Internet Archive / Archive.org
- The Crocodilians, Lizards and Snakes of North America (Government Printing Office, 1900).

== See also ==
- Category:Taxa named by Edward Drinker Cope
- Cope's rule
- Port Kennedy Bone Cave
- List of species in Port Kennedy Bone Cave

== Bibliography ==
- Alroy, John (October 2, 1999). "Edward Drinker Cope (1840–1897)". National Center for Ecological Analysis and Synthesis. University of California, Santa Barbara. Archived from the original on February 7, 2009.
- Bakker, R.T.; Galton, P.M.; Siegwarth, J.; Filla, J. (1990). "A new latest Jurassic vertebrate fauna, from the highest levels of the Morrison Formation at Como Bluff, Wyoming. Part IV. The dinosaurs: A new Othnielia-like hypsilophodontoid". Hunteria. 2 (6): 8–14.
- Beolens, Bo; Watkins, Michael; Grayson, Michael (2011). The Eponym Dictionary of Reptiles. Johns Hopkins University Press. p. xiii + 296. ISBN 978-1-4214-0135-5..
- Bowler, Peter (June 1977). "Edward Drinker Cope and the Changing Structure of Evolutionary Theory". Isis. 68 (2): 249–265. doi:10.1086/351770. JSTOR 230073. S2CID 143108828.
- Cahan, Eli (July 2, 2020). "Amid protests against racism, scientists move to strip offensive names from journals, prizes, and more". Science. Scientific Community News. American Association for the Advancement of Science. doi:10.1126/science.abd6441. S2CID 225546925.
- Colbert, Edwin (1984). The Great Dinosaur Hunters and Their Discoveries. Courier Dover Publications. ISBN 978-0-486-24701-4.
- Cope, Edward Drinker (1870). "On the skull of dicynodont Reptilia. Lystrosaurus frontosus from Cape Colony". Proc. Am. Philos. Soc. (11): 419.
- Cope, Edward Drinker (1876). "On some extinct reptiles and Batrachia from the Judith River and Fox Hills Beds of Montana". Proceedings of the Academy of Natural Sciences of Philadelphia (28): 340–359.
- Cope, Edward Drinker (1878). "On the Vertebrata of the Dakota Epoch of Colorado". Proc. Am. Philos. Soc. 17 (100): 233–247.
- Cope, Edward Drinker (1882). "Third contribution to the history of the Vertebrata of the Permian formation of Texas". Proc. Am. Philos. Soc. (20): 447–461.
- Cope, Edward Drinker (1887). The Origin of the Fittest: Essays on Evolution. D. Appleton.
- Cope, Edward Drinker (c. 1887). Theology of Evolution. Arnold (Philadelphia).
- Cope, Edward Drinker (1889). "On a new genus of Triassic Dinosauria". The American Naturalist. 23 (271): 626. doi:10.1086/274979.
- Cope, Edward Drinker (1974) [1896]. The Origin of the Fittest And The Primary Factors of Organic Evolution. Arno Press. ISBN 978-0-405-05729-8.
- Davidson, Jane (1997). The Bone Sharp: The Life of Edward Drinker Cope. Academy of Natural Sciences. ISBN 978-0-910006-53-8.
- Dingus, Lowell (2018). King of the Dinosaur Hunters : the life of John Bell Hatcher and the discoveries that shaped paleontology. Pegasus Books. ISBN 978-1-68177-865-5.
- Dodson, Peter; Robert Bakker (interviewees) (1992). The Dinosaurs! Episode 1: "The Monsters Emerge" (TV series). PBS Video, WHYY-TV.
- Faria, Felipe (2017). "The neo-Lamarckism of Edward Drinker Cope and the idea of biological progress in the evolutionary process". História, Ciências, Saúde – Manguinhos. 24 (4): 1009–1029. doi:10.1590/S0104-59702017000500009. PMID 29412255.
- Fowler, Henry W (March 30, 1963). "Special Anniversary Features: Cope in Retrospect". Copeia. 1963 (1): 195–198. doi:10.2307/1441319. JSTOR 1441319.
- Gallagher, William B (1997). When Dinosaurs Roamed New Jersey. New Brunswick: Rutgers University Press. ISBN 978-0-8135-2349-1.
- Gill, Theodore (October 1987). "Edward Drinker Cope, Naturalist-A Chapter in the History of Science". The American Naturalist. 31 (370): 831–86. doi:10.1086/276725.
- Gnidovec, Dale M. (July 1, 1998). "Media Reviews". Rocks & Minerals. 73 (4): 292–294. Bibcode:1998RoMin..73..292.. doi:10.1080/00357529809603019. ISSN 0035-7529.
- Hone, D.W.; Benton, M.J. (January 2005). "The evolution of large size: how does Cope's Rule work?" (PDF). Trends in Ecology and Evolution. 20 (1): 4–6. doi:10.1016/j.tree.2004.10.012. PMID 16701331.
- Jackson, J.R.; Quinn, A (2023). "Post-Darwinian Fish Classifications: Theories and Methodologies of Günther, Cope, and Gill". History and Philosophy of the Life Sciences. 45 (4): 1–37. doi:10.1007/s40656-022-00556-1. PMID 36692694.
- Jaffe, Mark (2000). The Gilded Dinosaur: The Fossil War Between E. D. Cope and O. C. Marsh and the Rise of American Science. New York: Crown Publishing Group. ISBN 978-0-517-70760-9.
- Lanham, Url (1973). The Bone Hunters. New York and London: Columbia University Press. ISBN 978-0-231-03152-3.
- Levins, Hoag (April 10, 2008). "Local Pioneer Dinosaur Hunter Honored". Historic Camden County.
- Moore, Randy; Decker, Mark; Cotner, Sehoya (2010). Chronology of the Evolution-Creationism Controversy. ABC-CLIO. ISBN 978-0-313-36288-0.
- Osborn, Henry Fairfield (1978) [1931]. Cope: Master Naturalist: Life and Letters of Edward Drinker Cope, With a Bibliography of His Writings. Manchester, New Hampshire: Ayer Company Publishing. ISBN 978-0-405-10735-1.
- MacCord, Kate (2019). "The impacts of assumptions on theories of tooth development and evolution at the turn of the nineteenth century". History and Philosophy of the Life Sciences. 41 (1) 12: 12. doi:10.1007/s40656-019-0245-2. PMID 30868283.
- Montgomery, Thos (January 1900). "Gordiacea from the Cope Collection". Biological Bulletin. 1 (2): 95–98. doi:10.2307/1535753. hdl:2027/hvd.32044107332736. JSTOR 1535753.
- Nussbaum, Ronald (September 1970). "Dicamptodon copei, n. sp., from the Pacific Northwest, U.S.A". Copeia. 1970 (3): 506–514. doi:10.2307/1442278. JSTOR 1442278.
- Penick, James (August 1971). "Professor Cope vs. Professor Marsh". American Heritage. 22 (5). Archived from the original on January 1, 2010.
- Polly, David (June 6, 1997). "Edward Drinker Cope (1840–1897)". University of California Museum of Paleontology. University of California, Berkeley.
- Polly, P. D.; Alroy, J. (October 2, 1998). "Cope's Rule". Science. 282 (5386): 50–51. Bibcode:1998Sci...282...47P. doi:10.1126/science.282.5386.47f. PMID 9786796. S2CID 41642689.
- Romer, Alfred S (December 1964). "Cope versus Marsh". Systematic Zoology. 13 (4): 201–207. doi:10.2307/2411780. JSTOR 2411780.
- Scharf, John Thomas; Thompson Westcott (1884). History of Philadelphia, 1609–1884, Volume 3. L. H. Everts & Company. p. 972.
- Schuller, Kyla (2012). "Taxonomies of Feeling: The Epistemology of Sentimentalism in Late-Nineteenth-Century Racial and Sexual Science". American Quarterly. 64 (2): 277–299. doi:10.1353/aq.2012.0023. JSTOR 23273517. S2CID 145004300.
- Shor, Elizabeth (1974). The Fossil Feud Between E. D. Cope and O. C. Marsh. Detroit, Michigan: Exposition Press. ISBN 978-0-682-47941-7.
- Sideris, Lisa (2003). Environmental Ethics, Ecological Theology, and Natural Selection. Columbia University Press. ISBN 978-0-231-12660-1.
- Spamer, Earle (January 1999). "Know Thyself; Responsible Science and the lectotype of Homo sapiens". Proceedings of the Academy of Natural Sciences. 149 (1): 109–114.
- Spamer, Earle (2002). "The Skull of Poor Old Cope". Annals of Improbable Research.
- Spitzka, Edward Anthony (1907). "A Study of the Brains of Six Eminent Scientists and Scholars Belonging to the American Anthropometric Society, together with a Description of the Skull of Professor E. D. Cope". Transactions of the American Philosophical Society. New Series. 1 (4): 176. doi:10.2307/1005434. JSTOR 1005434.
- Thomson, Keith Stewart (2008). The Legacy of the Mastodon: The Golden Age of Fossils in America. Yale University Press. ISBN 978-0-300-11704-2.
- Uetz, Peter; Stylianou, Alexandrea (January 24, 2018). "The original descriptions of reptiles and their subspecies". Zootaxa. 4375 (2): 257–264. doi:10.11646/zootaxa.4375.2.5. ISSN 1175-5334. PMID 29689772.
- Wilford, John Noble (1985). The Riddle of the Dinosaur. New York: Knopf Publishing. ISBN 978-0-394-74392-9.
- "Bone Wars: The Cope-Marsh Rivalry". The Academy of Natural Sciences. Archived from the original on April 24, 2012.
- "History of the Ichthyology Department". The Academy of Natural Sciences.
- "History of the Fossil Mammal Collection". American Museum of Natural History. Archived from the original on September 11, 2010.
- "Boulder Photographer Says Skull Accompanied Him During 'Hunting Dinosaur'". Associated Press. October 13, 1994.
- "Quaker and Special Collections: Edward Drinker Cope papers". Haverford College. Archived from the original on April 29, 2008.
- "Reptiles Database: Gambelia copeii". Reptarium.
