= Erythrochiton giganteus =

Conservation status
- Vulnerable (IUCN 3.1)

Scientific classification
- Kingdom: Plantae
- Clade: Tracheophytes
- Clade: Angiosperms
- Clade: Eudicots
- Clade: Rosids
- Order: Sapindales
- Family: Rutaceae
- Genus: Erythrochiton
- Species: E. giganteus

Binomial name
- Erythrochiton giganteus Kaastra & A.H.Gentry

Species of flowering plant

Erythrochiton giganteus is a species of flowering plant in the family Rutaceae. It is a shrub or tree endemic to Ecuador.
