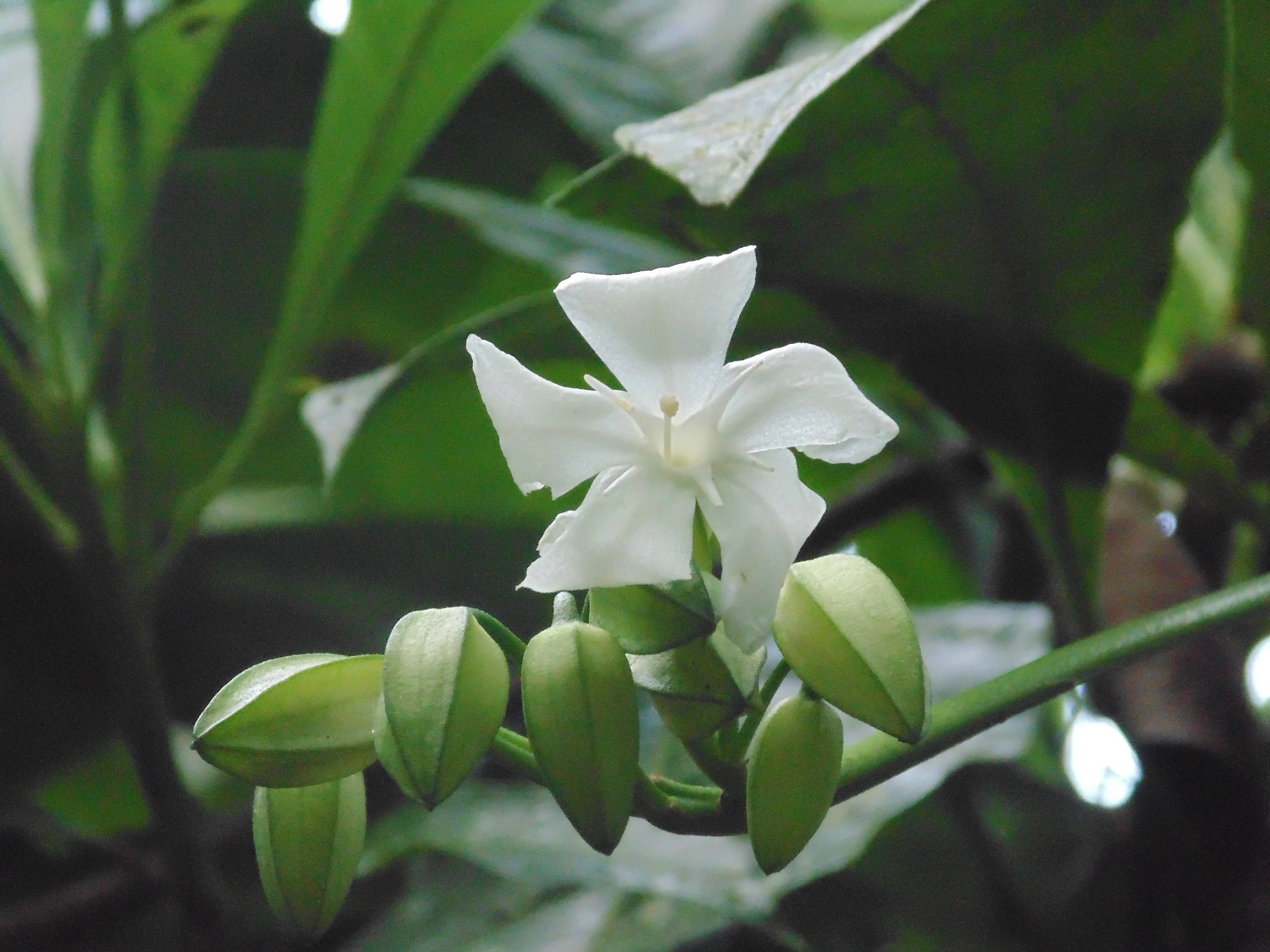
- Photo taken in Carara National Park

Scientific classification
- Kingdom: Plantae
- Clade: Tracheophytes
- Clade: Angiosperms
- Clade: Eudicots
- Clade: Rosids
- Order: Sapindales
- Family: Rutaceae
- Genus: Erythrochiton
- Species: E. gymnanthus

Binomial name
- Erythrochiton gymnanthus Kallunki

= Erythrochiton gymnanthus =

Species of tree

Erythrochiton gymnanthus is an endangered tree or shrub from the family Rutaceae. It is endemic to Costa Rica. The genus Erythrochiton consists of only twelve species and it native to the Neotropical region.

== Description ==
Erythrochiton gymnanthus reaches a height between 1.5 and 6 metres. The young branches are glabrous. Each branch bearing a leaf tuft. The alternate unifoliate leaves are 14.5 to 36.4 centimetre in length and 3.5 to 11 centimetres in width. The leaves are obovate or oblanceolate, sometimes narrow oblanceolate. They are cuneate and decurrent at base. The adaxial surface smooth of the petiole is 0.5 to 3 cm. The flowers are white. The corolla is 4.5 to 6 centimetre in diameter. The fruit is a capsule which is formed by 4 to 5 glabrous carpels measuring 1.6 to 1.9 cm. The flowering time is from April to July.

== Distribution and habitat ==
Erythrochtion gymnanthus is endemic to the Central Pacific Conservation Area of Costa Rica, in particular the regions of Barranca and Miramar and in the Carara National Park. It grows mostly in elevations from 20 to 100 metres in humid forests.

== Status ==
Erythrochiton gymnanthus is threatened due to leaf diseases and the fragmentation of its habitat.
