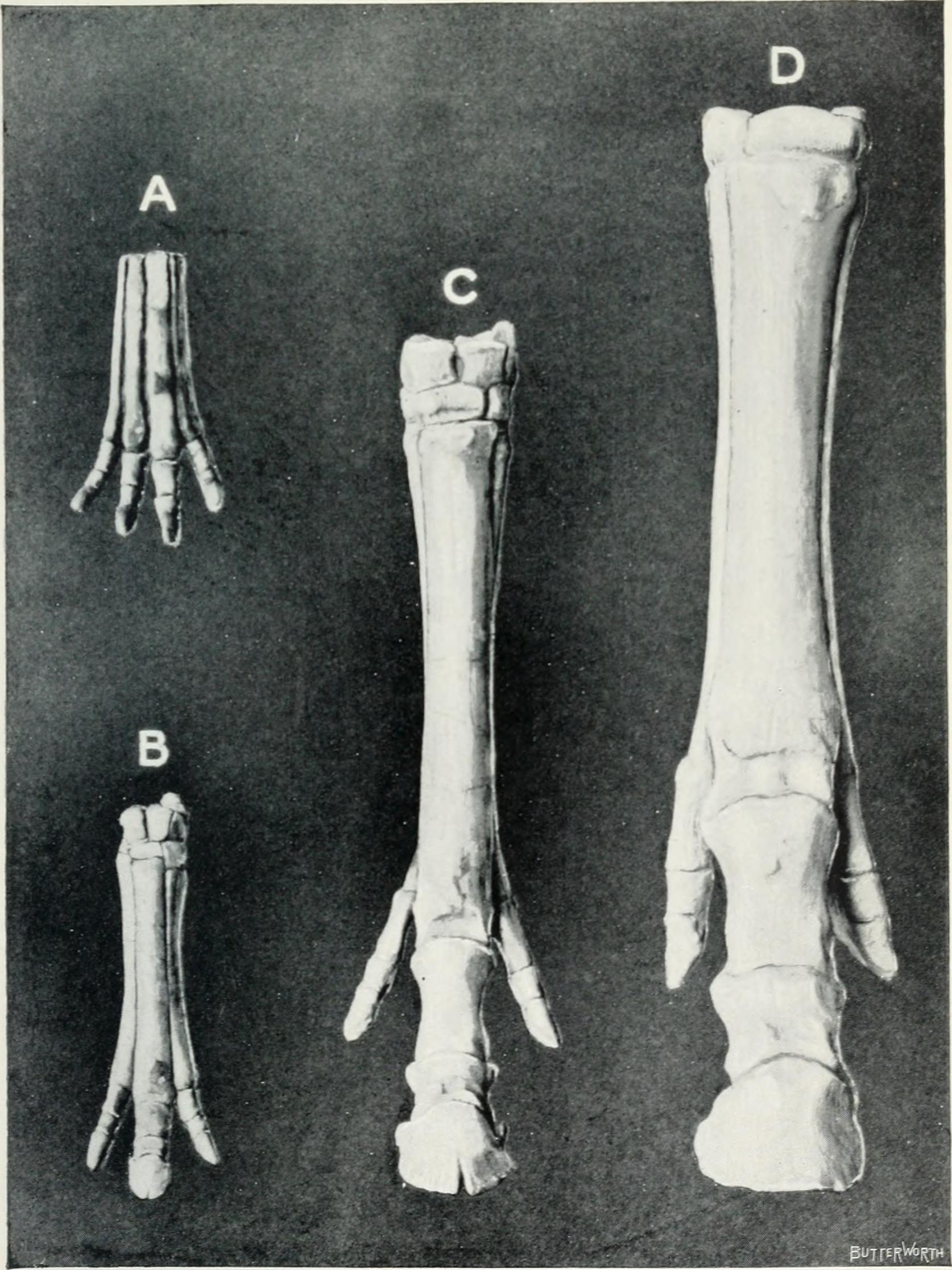
- Bones of fore-feet (specimen D)

Scientific classification
- Kingdom: Animalia
- Phylum: Chordata
- Class: Mammalia
- Infraclass: Placentalia
- Order: Perissodactyla
- Family: Equidae
- Genus: Equus
- Species: †E. giganteus

Binomial name
- †Equus giganteus Gidley, 1901

= Equus giganteus =

Equus giganteus Temporal range: Blancan–Pleistocene

Extinct species of mammal

The giant horse (Equus giganteus) is a dubious extinct species of horse that lived in North America. It was classified based on the finding of a single tooth from Texas, larger than the teeth of even the largest modern draft horses. Based on the tooth, the weight was estimated at 1,200–1,500 kg (2,600–3,300 lb) and the height at 2.25 m (7 ft 5 in) tall at the shoulder. Because it is based on fragmentary remains, subsequent authors have considered the species to be a nomen dubium.
