= Osmotherium =

Osmotherium Temporal range: 1.8–0.3 Ma Pleistocene

Scientific classification
- Kingdom: Animalia
- Phylum: Chordata
- Class: Mammalia
- Order: Carnivora
- Suborder: Caniformia
- Family: Mustelidae
- Genus: †Osmotherium; Cope, 1896

Type species
- Osmotherium spelaeum Cope, 1896

Synonyms
- Osmotherium Cope, 1896, nom. nud.

Extinct genus of skunks

Osmotherium is an extinct genus of skunk from Pleistocene North America. it contains a single species, Osmotherium spelaeum. The genus name, Osmotherium, hails from Aincient Greek, osmḗ, "smell"; and therium, "beast"; meaning smelly beast. The species name, spelaeum, Latin for "cave", in reference to the sole locality which its remains have been found in, Port Kennedy Bone Cave.

While fragmentary, Osmotherium spelaeum's jaws are the most prominent of any other Mephitid in the locality, with Cope himself describing 6 different specimens, although attributing some to Mephitis, Brachyprotoma and the now defunct Pelycictis.

While information on these fragmentary remains scarce, in 2005 Wang et al.'s description of Martinogale faulli, Osmotherium was recovered as a sister genus to Mephitis:

- Mephitidae
  - - Mydaus
    - Palaeomephitis
    - Promephitis
  - Mephitini
    - Martinogale faulli
    - - Martinogale chisoensis
      - - Martinogale alveodens
        - - Buisnictis
          - - Spilogale
            - - - Brachyprotoma
                - - Mephitis
                  - Osmotherium
              - Conepatus
