= Buisnictis =

Buisnictis Temporal range: 5.3–4 Ma Early Pliocene

Scientific classification
- Kingdom: Animalia
- Phylum: Chordata
- Class: Mammalia
- Order: Carnivora
- Suborder: Caniformia
- Family: Mephitidae
- Genus: †Buisnictis; C. W. Hibbard 1950

Type species
- Buisnictis breviramus C. W. Hibbard 1941

Other Species
- Buisnictis schoffi Hibbard,1954; Buisnictis burrowsi Skinner and Hibbard, 1972; Buisnictis metabatos Wang et al. 2014

Synonyms
- "Brachyprotoma" breviramus Hibbard,1941; Buisnictis meadensis Hibbard,1950

Extinct genus of skunk

Buisnictis is an extinct genus of skunk from Pliocene North America, ranging all the way from Washington to Baja California. There are currently four accepted species: Buisnictis breviramus, Buisnictis schoffi, Buisnictis burrowsi and Buisnictis metabatos.

== Phylogeny ==
As of Wang, Whistler and Takeuchi, 2005, Buisnictis was recovered as a more derived skunk, while in 2014 Wang, Carranza-Castañeda and Aranda Gómez suggested Buisnictis, specifically B. metabatos, may have been the ancestor of the crown Pleistocene skunks.

- Mephitidae
  - - Mydaus
    - Palaeomephitis
    - Promephitis
  - Mephitini
    - Martinogale faulli
    - - Martinogale chisoensis
      - - Martinogale alveodens
        - - Buisnictis
          - - Spilogale
            - - - Brachyprotoma
                - - Mephitis
                  - Osmotherium
              - Conepatus
