= Martinogale =

Martinogale Temporal range: 11.5–8 Ma Late Miocene

Scientific classification
- Kingdom: Animalia
- Phylum: Chordata
- Class: Mammalia
- Infraclass: Placentalia
- Order: Carnivora
- Family: Mephitidae
- Genus: †Martinogale; E. Raymond Hall 1930

Type species
- Martinogale alveodens E. Raymond Hall 1930

Other Species
- Martinogale chisoensis Stevens and Stevens, 2003; Martinogale faulli Wang, Whistler and Takeuchi, 2005

Extinct genus of skunk

Martinogale is an extinct genus of skunk from the Late Miocene of central North America. There exist three accepted species, M. alveodens, M.chisoensis and M. faulli, which may have overlapped in range but occupied somewhat distinct moments of the Late Miocene. As well as the dubious Martinogale? nambiana.

== Description and species ==
Martinogale, as happens with most fossil skunks, has been solely described off of fragmentary craneal remains. The genus is mainly characterized by its jaws: in the upper jaw there's an absent upper Molar$^2$, and greatly enlarged but thin upper Premolar$^4$ and Molar$^1$; while the lower jaw has a small and forward P$^2$, the absence of a lingual or labial cingulum around the P$^4$ and a well developed M$^1$; neither jaw has a present Premolar$^1$. In regards to skull morphology, it is smoother and narrower than in living skunks, with a large, flask-shaped basicranial bulla.

=== Martinogale alveodens ===
This species was described in 1930 as a small mustelid from a fragmentary lower jaw found in the Edson Quarry, from late Hemphillian Kansas. It was described as the type of the new genus. Due to its fragmentary nature, the placement of Martinogale within Mustelidae was uncertain, but seemed feasible due to some similarities to the earlier Martes nambianus. In 1938, a better preserved jaw indicated similarities with the spotted skunks of Mephitidae. The species name, alveodens, hails from Latin alveus, “a hollow, cavity or channel" and dens, "tooth"

=== Martinogale chisoensis ===
The largest species, M. chisoensis hails from the early Hemphillian Crew Bean Local, it was described in 2003 based on a rather complete skull. Due to the cranial similarities with Buisnictis it was named "Buisnictis" chisoensis. In 2005, along with the description of M. faulli, it was reassigned to Martinogale. The species name, chisoensis, comes from Chisos Mountains in Big Bend National Park, Texas, and ensis, Latin for “from”.

=== Martinogale faulli ===
The oldest and smallest of the species, M. faulli was described in 2005 from a partial skull found in the Late Clarendonian Dove Spring Formation, from Kern County, California. M. faulli has a smoother skull than M. chisoensis and relatively smaller teeth, with a better defined basicranial bulla. The species name faulli is in honor of Mark Faull, a former ranger at Red Rock Canyon State Park.

=== Martinogale? nambiana ===
In 1874, a P$^3$, P$^4$and an incredibly fragmentary M$^1$were discovered in the Santa Fé Marls, New Mexico. Cope originally identified it as Martes nambianus, uncertain of this association, a year later Cope moved it to Mustela nambiana. When Hall erected Martinogale, he moved M. nambiana into his new genus, where it has since remained. In 2005, Wang et al. argued that the few characteristics present in these teeth were too non-specific, arguing that they simply represent the basal mustelid condition and that M? nambiana should not be considered a part of Martinogale; that the specimen can't be ascribed to a concrete genus.

== Phylogeny ==
When compared to modern genera, both extant: Spilogale, Mephitis and Conepatus, as well as extinct: Brachyprotoma and Osmotherium, Martinogale presents reasonable differences in the premolar structure, thin postorbital skull, slightly expanded mastoid process and the general structure of the basicranial bulla. In 2005 Wang et al.'s phylogenetic analysis recovered Martinogale as a somewhat paraphyletic association, although as their chronology advances so does their derivation:

- Mephitidae
  - - Mydaus
    - Palaeomephitis
    - Promephitis
  - Mephitini
    - Martinogale faulli
    - - Martinogale chisoensis
      - - Martinogale alveodens
        - - Buisnictis
          - - Spilogale
            - - - Brachyprotoma
                - - Mephitis
                  - Osmotherium
              - Conepatus
