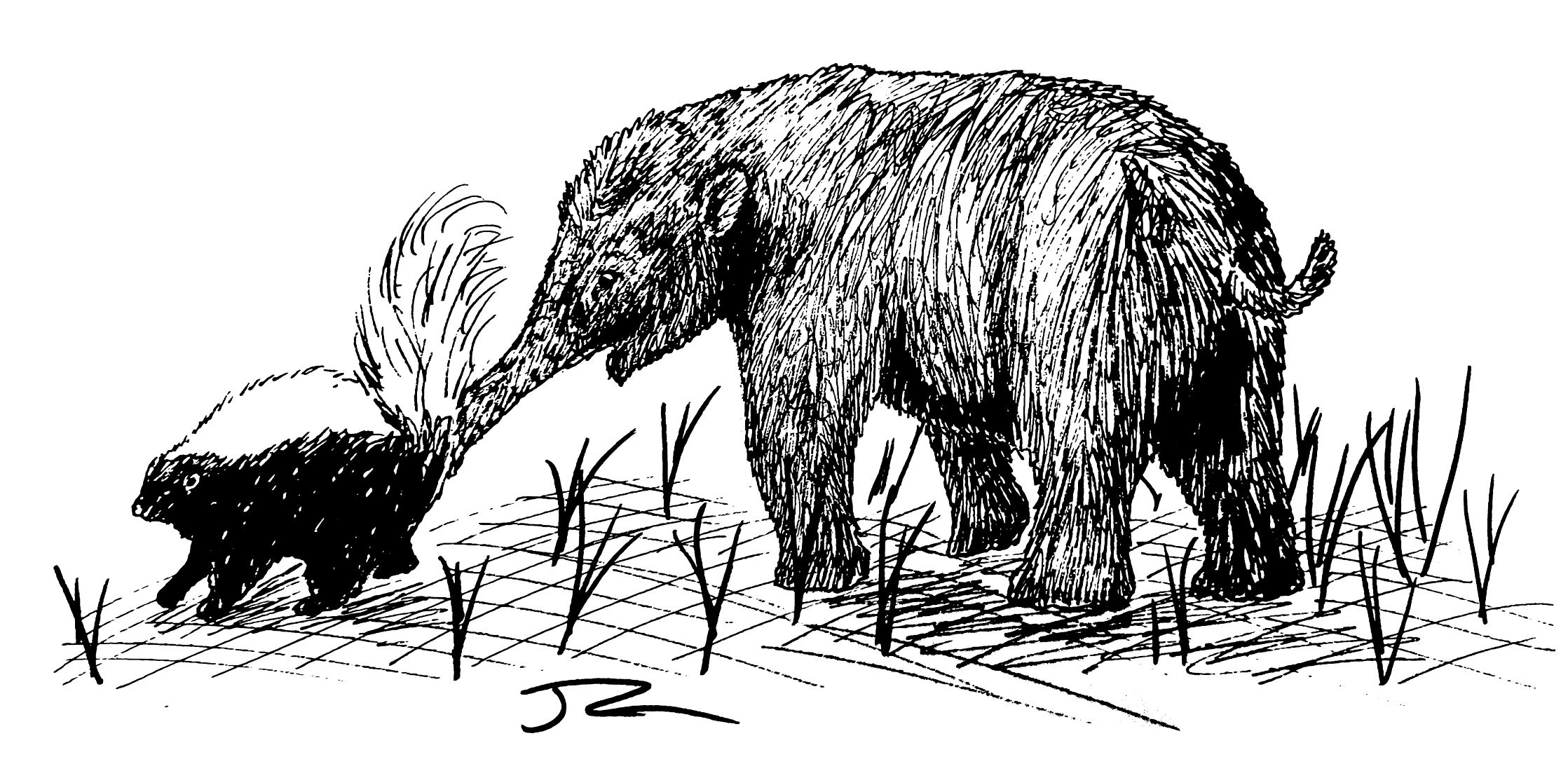
- An ink drawing of an American Mastodon calf encountering a short-faced skunk, Brachyprotoma.

Scientific classification
- Kingdom: Animalia
- Phylum: Chordata
- Class: Mammalia
- Infraclass: Placentalia
- Order: Carnivora
- Family: Mephitidae
- Genus: Brachyprotoma; Brown 1908
- Species: B. obtusata

Binomial name
- Brachyprotoma obtusata Cope 1899

= Brachyprotoma =

Brachyprotoma Temporal range: Pleistocene

Extinct genus of carnivores

Brachyprotoma, also known as the short-faced skunks, is an extinct genus of large skunk that inhabited Pleistocene North America, with specimens having been found from Yukon to West Virginia. There currently exists only one accepted species, Brachyprotoma obtusata.

== Description ==
Brachyprotoma obtusata is known solely from its jaws and teeth, thus postcranial elements are deduced based on the relatively similar hog-nosed skunks, but as a more robust form. The holotype, USNM 12045, is a damaged lower jaw that measures 3 cm (1.2 in) long. Brachyprotoma obtusata's jaw is considered to possess several primitive characteristics, such as the large size of Premolar $^4$ and Molar$^1$, the large size of the anterior premolars, the smaller protocone in P$^4$, the weaker metaconid in M$^1$ and the transverse elongation of M$^1$; and some more derived traits, B. obtusata has two upper and three lower premolars, having gotten rid of the anterior-most premolars.

== Etymology and Phylogeny ==
The generic name Brachyprotoma, from the Ancient Greek brachy, meaning short; and protomē, the head and neck of a decapitated animal; in reference to the holotype's robust appearance as well as the curious lack of postcranial remains. The specific name obtusata hails from the Latin obtusitas, meaning dense.

The precise phylogenetic relationships of Brachyprotoma within Mephitidae remain controversial, it shares a dental formula with Promephitis hootoni, while its P$^4$ shares more characteristics with those in the genus Mephitis. As of Wang et al. 2005, Brachyprotoma obtusata was recovered as a more derived skunk:

- Mephitidae
  - - Mydaus
    - Palaeomephitis
    - Promephitis
  - Mephitini
    - Martinogale faulli
    - - Martinogale chisoensis
      - - Martinogale alveodens
        - - Buisnictis
          - - Spilogale
            - - - Brachyprotoma
                - - Mephitis
                  - Osmotherium
              - Conepatus

== Extinction ==
It is unclear why Brachyprotoma obtusata went extinct along with the North American megafauna, there are several present specimens in the Bonneville Basin, Utah, circa 24.000 to 18.000 years ago. However, the species is absent in more recent strata; where only generalists remain, suggesting some degree of specialization in Brachyprotoma obtusata, perhaps related to the megafauna itself.
