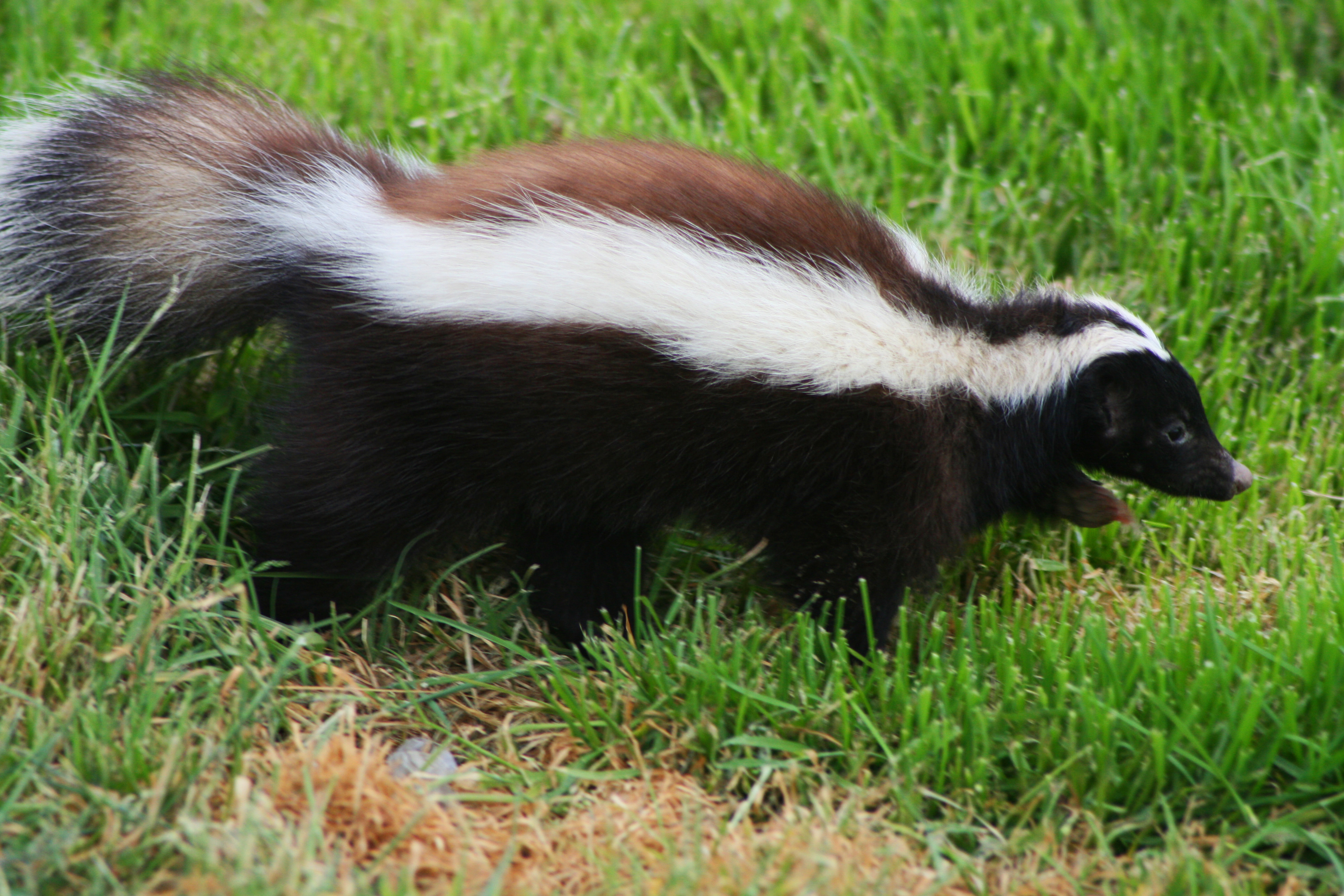

Conservation status
- Least Concern (IUCN 3.1)
- CITES Appendix II (CITES)

Scientific classification
- Kingdom: Animalia
- Phylum: Chordata
- Class: Mammalia
- Order: Carnivora
- Family: Mephitidae
- Genus: Conepatus
- Species: C. humboldtii

Binomial name
- Conepatus humboldtii Gray, 1837
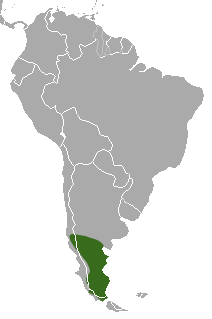
- Humboldt's hog-nosed skunk range

= Humboldt's hog-nosed skunk =

Species of carnivore

Humboldt's hog-nosed skunk (Conepatus humboldtii), also known as the Patagonian hog-nosed skunk, is a species of hog-nosed skunk indigenous to the open grassy areas in the Patagonian regions of South Argentina and Chile. It belongs to the order Carnivora and the family Mephitidae.

== Appearance and anatomy ==
This skunk is small and stocky, with a bare nose elongated for the purpose of finding ground beetles, grasshoppers and crickets. Its fur is brownish-red with two symmetrical stripes on either side, extending to the tail. It ranges from 30 to 34 cm in body length, with a 17- to 21-cm tail. They usually weigh 1.5 to 3.0 kg. The skunk has long claws and well developed forelimbs in order to dig to locate prey.

Its teeth are specialized for the consumption of invertebrates and fruit, their lower molars are adapted for crushing such resistant foods. Similar adaptation of the molars is seen in the South American gray fox. Like all South American hog-nosed skunks, it is smaller with a more primitive skull and tooth structure than North American skunks.

== Habitat and ecology ==
There is high pressure from intraguild predation on Humboldt's hog-nosed skunks. It is often preyed upon and targeted competitively by larger carnivorans such as the culpeo, chilla fox, Geoffrey's cat, pampas cat, Andean cat, and puma. It, however, is unlikely to target other carnivorans.

== Diet ==
Humboldt's hog-nosed skunks are omnivorous, feeding primarily on insects but also on vertebrate prey, such as rodents and carrion during winters, when insects are less abundant. Patagonian hog nosed skunks have also been known to eat fruit.

Unlike other South American carnivorans, it is less affected by competition from increased dietary homogenization in areas where native prey species have gone extinct due to its largely strictly insectivorous diet.

== Behavior ==
Humboldt's hog-nosed skunks are crepuscular, active primarily at dawn and twilight. It does little in the way of active hunting, selecting prey that is easiest to capture. During the winter seasons, it shifts from its open grassy habitats to shrubs, forests, and mountainous areas as insect populations decline to seek alternative food sources.

== Taxonomic status ==
John Edward Gray named the species in honor of Alexander von Humboldt.

C. humboldtii's and C. chinga's status as separate species is debated. There is a high degree of observed variation in coloration and pattern within the two species and observed differences are inconsistent. Much of the variation in shape and size observed can be attributed to environmental influence. Morphological comparisons also show a wide overlap in skull and mandibular structure. In 2021, the American Society of Mammalogists considered C. humboldtii conspecific with C. chinga.
