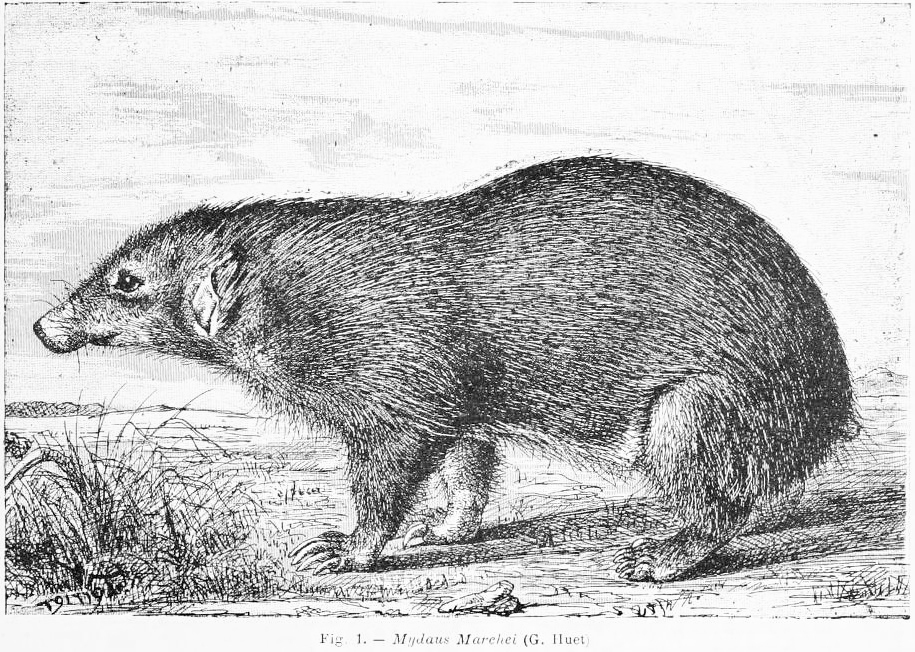

Conservation status
- Least Concern (IUCN 3.1)

Scientific classification
- Kingdom: Animalia
- Phylum: Chordata
- Class: Mammalia
- Order: Carnivora
- Family: Mephitidae
- Genus: Mydaus
- Species: M. marchei

Binomial name
- Mydaus marchei (Huet, 1887)
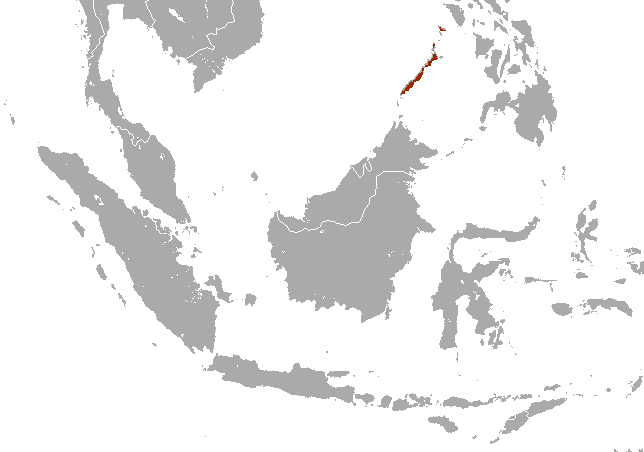
- Palawan stink badger range

= Palawan stink badger =

Species of carnivore

The Palawan stink badger (Mydaus marchei), pantot or tuldo in the Batak language, is a carnivoran of the western Philippines named for its resemblance to badgers, its powerful smell, and the largest island to which it is native, Palawan. Like all stink badgers, the Palawan stink badger was once thought to share a more recent common ancestor with badgers than with skunks. Recent genetic evidence, however, has led to their re-classification as one of the Mephitidae, the skunk family of mammals. It is the size of a large skunk or small badger, and uses its badger-like body to dig by night for invertebrates in open areas near patches of brush. While it lacks the whitish dorsal patches typical of its closest relatives, predators and hunters generally avoid the powerful noxious chemicals it can spray from the specialized anal glands characteristic of mephitids.

== Description ==
Although smaller than true badgers, the Palawan stink badger is one of the larger members of the skunk family, the Mephitidae. Adults measure 32 to 46 cm (13 to 18 in) in length, about the same size as the striped skunk native to North America, and weigh anything from 0.85 to 2.5 kg (1.9 to 5.5 lb). In physical appearance, however, they more closely resemble badgers than skunks. They have a pointed snout with a mobile nose, and a stocky body with short and powerful limbs bearing sharply recurved claws. The tail is very short in comparison to the body, measuring only 1.5 to 4.5 cm (0.59 to 1.77 in), and lacking the bushy fur of many skunks. The ears are almost invisible, with only vestigial pinnae, and the eyes are also relatively small.

The fur is dark brown to black over most of the body, fading to a more brownish colour on the underparts. There are also scattered white hairs across the back and over the forehead, but not the white stripe and head-patch found on the closely related Sunda stink badger. Compared with its sister species, the Palawan stink badger is also slightly smaller, with larger teeth and longer fur. Females have six teats.

== Distribution and habitat ==
Palawan stink badgers live on the Philippine island of Palawan, and also on the neighbouring islands of Busuanga and Calauit. They live primarily in the grasslands and cultivated areas on these islands, and use local shrubs for shelter.

The Palawan stink badger was described as "surprisingly common" in the 1970s, however, it is now considered a vulnerable species by the IUCN. It is unclear whether loss of habitat is adversely affecting M. marchei populations, but, being an endemic species that only inhabits two islands, its conservation is of concern. At this time, there does not appear to be any Philippine law protecting the creature, nor is there any conservation work concerning this species being conducted at this time.

== Biology ==
Palawan stink badgers are nocturnal, and feed mainly on invertebrates, such as freshwater crabs and small insects, which they dig out of the ground with their long claws. They are good diggers, and may spend the day in excavated dens. They may travel up to 2 km (1.2 mi) in search of food, and are reported to mark their territory with scent. They are slow moving, and not particularly aggressive, either freezing or emitting a warning snarl when threatened.

Like skunks, Palawan stink badgers possess anal scent glands that emit a pungent yellowish liquid. They are able to spray the liquid up to a metre, and the scent is said to be strong enough to be smelled up to a mile away. The stink badgers rely almost entirely on this powerful odour for their defence, and are among the few wild animals not eaten by the local farmers.
