= Conepatus robustus =

Conepatus robustus Temporal range: Late Pleistocene

Scientific classification
- Domain: Eukaryota
- Kingdom: Animalia
- Phylum: Chordata
- Class: Mammalia
- Order: Carnivora
- Family: Mephitidae
- Genus: Conepatus
- Species: †C. robustus

Binomial name
- †Conepatus robustus (Martin, 1978)

Extinct species of skunk

Conepatus robustus, the Florida hog-nosed skunk, is an extinct species of skunk known from the Sangamonian of Florida.

The Florida hog-nosed skunk was larger than any living species of hog-nosed skunk, and would have been the largest living skunk at the time it existed.
