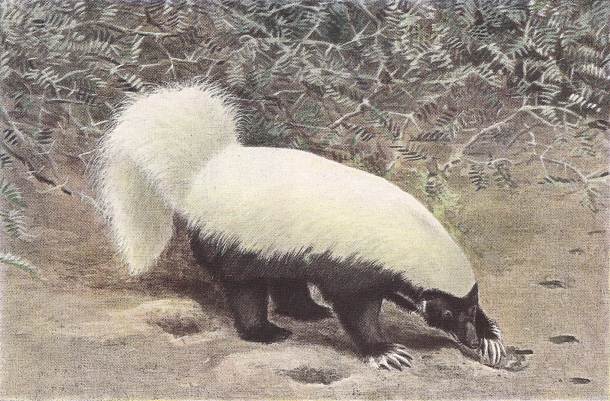

Conservation status
- Least Concern (IUCN 3.1)

Scientific classification
- Kingdom: Animalia
- Phylum: Chordata
- Class: Mammalia
- Order: Carnivora
- Family: Mephitidae
- Genus: Conepatus
- Species: C. leuconotus

Binomial name
- Conepatus leuconotus (Lichtenstein, 1832)
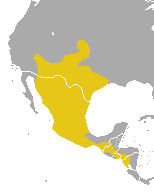
- Conepatus leuconotus range

= American hog-nosed skunk =

Species of carnivore

The American hog-nosed skunk (Conepatus leuconotus) is a species of hog-nosed skunk from Central and North America, and is one of the largest skunks in the world, growing to lengths of up to 2.7 feet (82 cm). Recent work has concluded the western hog-nosed skunk (formerly Conepatus mesoleucus) is the same species, and Conepatus leuconotus is the correct name of the merged populations.

In Texas, it is commonly known as the rooter skunk for its habit of rooting and overturning rocks and debris in search of food.

== Description ==
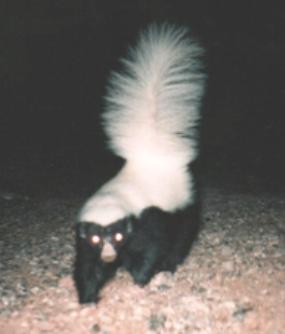
Hog-nosed skunk

The distinguishing feature of the American hog-nosed skunk is it has a single, broad white stripe from the top of the head to the base of the tail, with the tail itself being completely white. It is the only skunk that lacks a white dot or medial bar between the eyes and has primarily black body fur. The snout of C. leuconotus is relatively long, with a naked nose pad, and resembles the nose of a small hog. The nose pad (20 mm wide by 25 mm long) is about three times wider than that of Mephitis mephitis. The ears are small and rounded, and the eyes are relatively small. The fur is short and coarse.

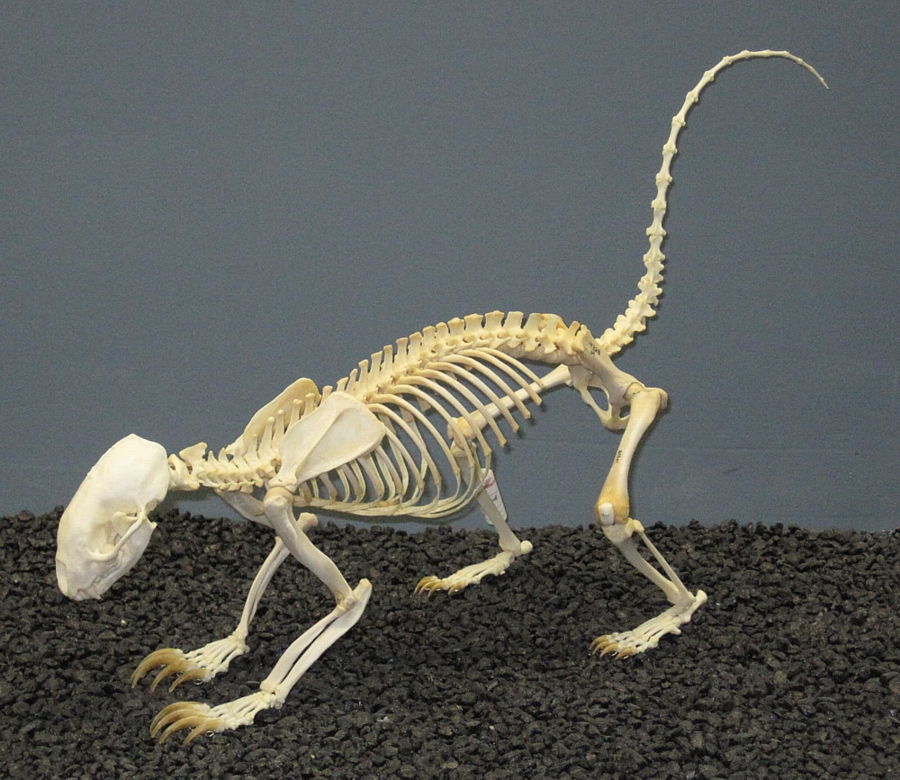
A hog-nosed skunk skeleton on exhibit at the Museum of Osteology, Oklahoma City, Oklahoma

The American hog-nosed skunk has stocky legs and plantigrade feet (the entire sole of the foot touches the ground). Its hind feet are broad and large with soles that are naked for about one-half their length. Its upper body is powerfully built, and the fore claws are very long. Length can range from 44.4–93.4 cm (17.5–36.8 in) and weight is typically 1,130–4,500 g (2.49–9.92 lb). The striped skunk can broadly overlap in size with this species, but in comparison the striped, has a shorter head-and-body length and a longer tail than the hog-nosed skunk. Males of this species average about 10% larger than females.

The American hog-nosed skunk is adapted for digging, and resembles badgers rather than other species of skunks in this respect. The rectangular-shaped scapula, strong forearms, and shape of the humeri of C. leuconotus resemble those of badgers. The nostrils are located ventrally and open downward. Their sense of smell is acute, and the nose is used in locating and capturing buried prey. This skunk species also is a capable climber, although not as agile as the spotted skunks of the genus Spilogale.

== Reproduction ==
C. leuconotus breeds from late February through early March; most adult females are pregnant by the end of March. Typically, gestation lasts about 60 days. Birth occurs in April and May. Half-grown young have been observed in late July and mid-August, and by late August young begin to disperse. The litter size is one to five young, although two to four are most common.

== Range and habitat ==
This species occurs in canyons, stream sides, and rocky terrain. It has been collected in a variety of habitats in Mexico, including open desert-scrub and mesquite-grasslands, tropical areas, mountains, coastal plains, cornfields surrounded by brushland or adjacent to grassy plains and thickets of bull-horn acacia, thorn woodland, and riparian forests, characterized by live-oaks, pecans, sycamores, and Texas persimmons and an understory of briars, grasses, and weeds. It also has been found in pine–oak forest and in scrub and cacti. In Kleberg County, Texas, C. leuconotus occurs in mesquite-brushland, pastures, and native grassland, used exclusively for cattle ranching. Thorny brush and cactus are the predominant vegetation in the region of southern Texas where this species occurs.

It is omnivorous, feeding primarily on insects and vegetation, though it will take small mammals and reptiles when available. While sometimes considered a pest by crop farmers due to their rooting habits, this is largely misplaced, as it generally prefers insects to agricultural plants. Like all skunk species, it possesses powerful anal glands used to deter would-be attackers.

=== Subspecies ===
Three subspecies are currently recognized, although one may be extinct:

- C. l. leuconotus (eastern hog-nosed skunk) – Texas, New Mexico, Arizona, Mexico, Guatemala, Honduras, Nicaragua
- C. l. figginsi (Furnace Canyon hog-nosed skunk) – Colorado
- C. l. telmalestes (Big Thicket hog-nosed skunk)† – Oklahoma and southeastern Texas

== Conservation ==
Although not threatened through most of its range, one subspecies, the Big Thicket hog-nosed skunk (C. l. telmalestes) of Oklahoma and southeastern Texas, is now considered extinct by the IUCN.

Globally, this species is of low concern for conservation efforts, but at the local level, it is considered threatened in some states. In Colorado, for instance, it was ranked as "critically imperiled because of extreme rarity (five or fewer records of occurrence in the state or less than 1,000 individuals)" as of 2006. In New Mexico and Oklahoma, it was ranked as "Imperiled because of rarity (six to 20 occurrences or less than 3,000 individuals)", also as of 2006. The situation is far different in Texas and Arizona, though; the populations are high enough for the species to be legally harvested throughout the year and is designated as a "fur bearer" by the United States Forest Service.
