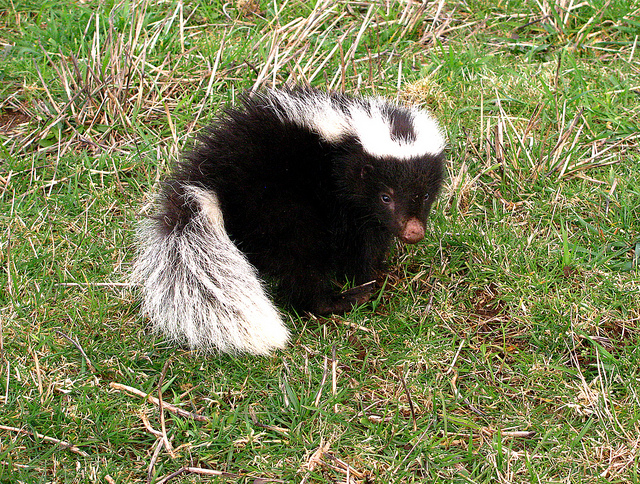

Conservation status
- Least Concern (IUCN 3.1)

Scientific classification
- Kingdom: Animalia
- Phylum: Chordata
- Class: Mammalia
- Order: Carnivora
- Family: Mephitidae
- Genus: Conepatus
- Species: C. chinga

Binomial name
- Conepatus chinga (Molina, 1782)
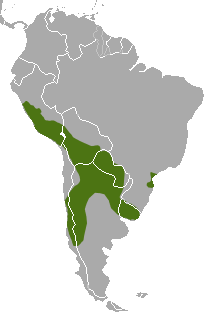
- Molina's hog-nosed skunk range

= Molina's hog-nosed skunk =

Species of carnivore

Molina's hog-nosed skunk, also called the Andes skunk (Conepatus chinga), is a skunk species from South America. It is found in Argentina, Bolivia, Brazil, Chile, Peru, Paraguay, and Uruguay, at elevations up to 5000 m.

== Habitat ==
The Molina's hog-nosed skunk's native range is throughout mid to southern South America, Chile, Peru, northern Argentina, Bolivia, Paraguay, Uruguay, and southern Brazil. The mammal is therefore associated with temperate regions and open areas, mainly described as the Pampas biome and preferring to live in open vegetation, shrub forest and rocky sloped areas.

== Population and distribution ==
Typically they will live alone in an average home range size of about 1.66 individuals/km^{2} with some overlapping and about six skunks per 3.5 km^{2}. Although living in mostly solitary areas, the skunks will come together temporarily for mating purposes.

== Diet ==
Foraging mainly at night, the skunk is omnivorous, eating birds, small mammals, eggs, insects, leaves, and fruit. The tooth morphology in the Molina's hog-nosed skunk, is different from most mammals in that their teeth are adapted to their omnivorous diet with grinding being the main function of the carnassial apparatus.

== Conservation status ==
The skunk is listed as "least concern" according to the IUCN Red List. The main threats to the skunk are increased habitat destruction and fragmentation from over exploitation of humans and grazing in agriculture. The skunk is also affected by the planning of new roads and road-kills. Due to improper planning, habitat destruction, and fragmentation, the skunk has started living around man-made structures and along fences and buildings.
