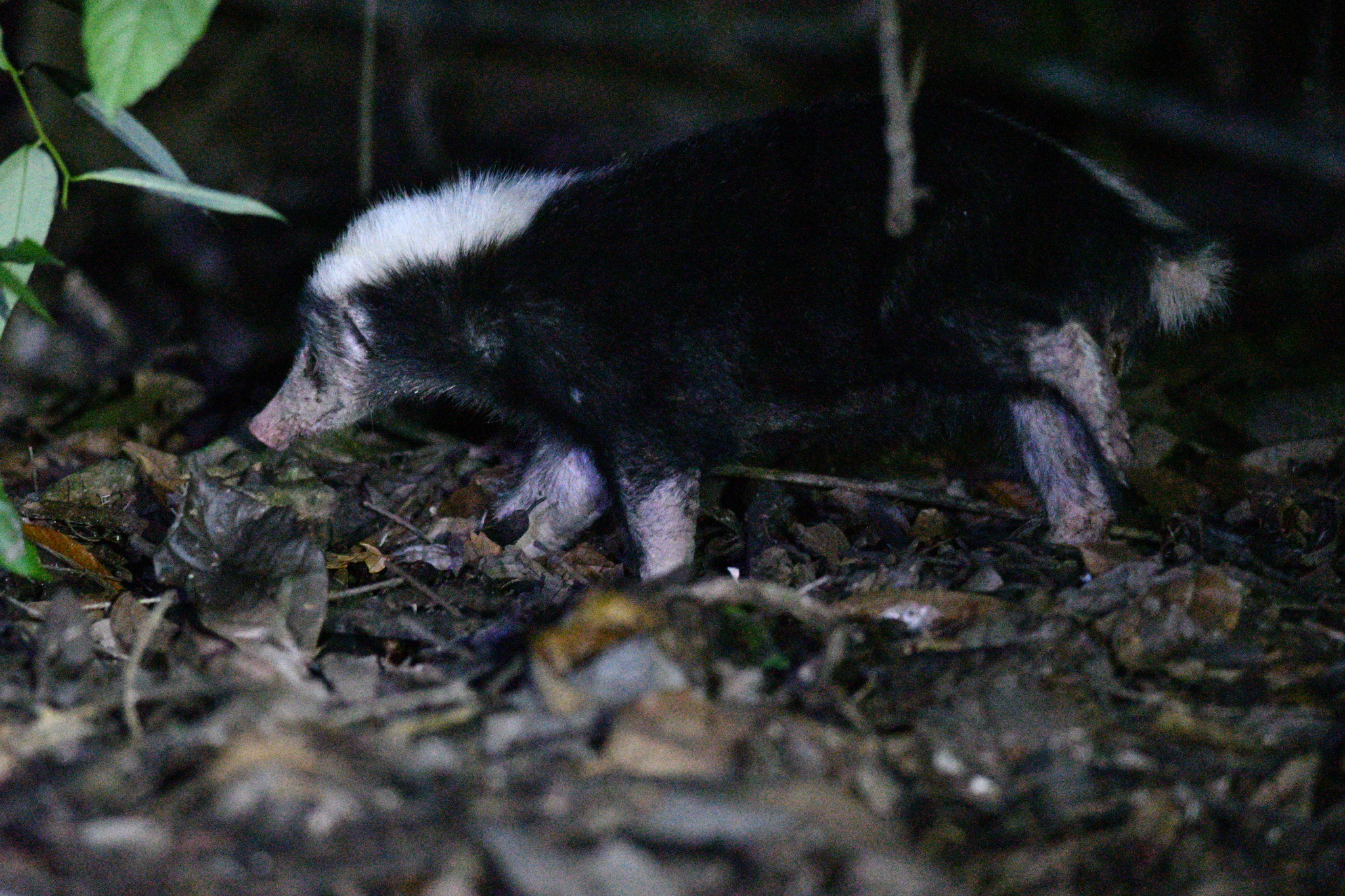

Conservation status
- Least Concern (IUCN 3.1)

Scientific classification
- Kingdom: Animalia
- Phylum: Chordata
- Class: Mammalia
- Order: Carnivora
- Family: Mephitidae
- Genus: Mydaus
- Species: M. javanensis

Binomial name
- Mydaus javanensis (Desmarest, 1820)
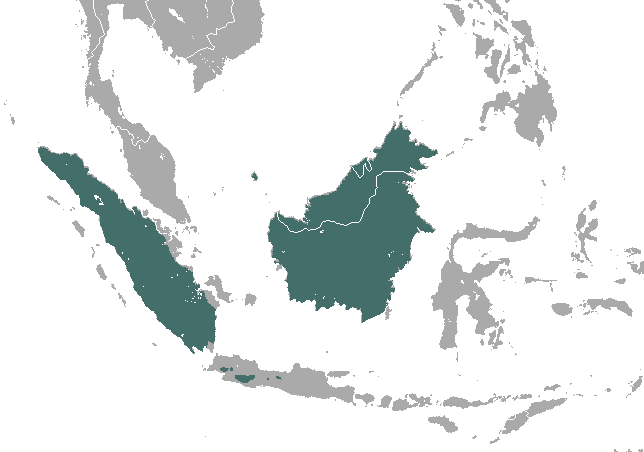
- Sunda stink badger range

Synonyms
- Mydaus meliceps

= Sunda stink badger =

Species of carnivore

The Sunda stink badger (Mydaus javanensis), also called the Javan stink badger, teledu, Malay stink badger, Malay badger, Indonesian stink badger and Sunda skunk, is a mammal native to Indonesia and Malaysia. Despite its common name, it is not closely related to true badgers, but is an Old World relative of the skunks. Coincidentally, its local name sigung in Sundanese is a false cognate to skunk which is of Algonquian origin.

== Description ==
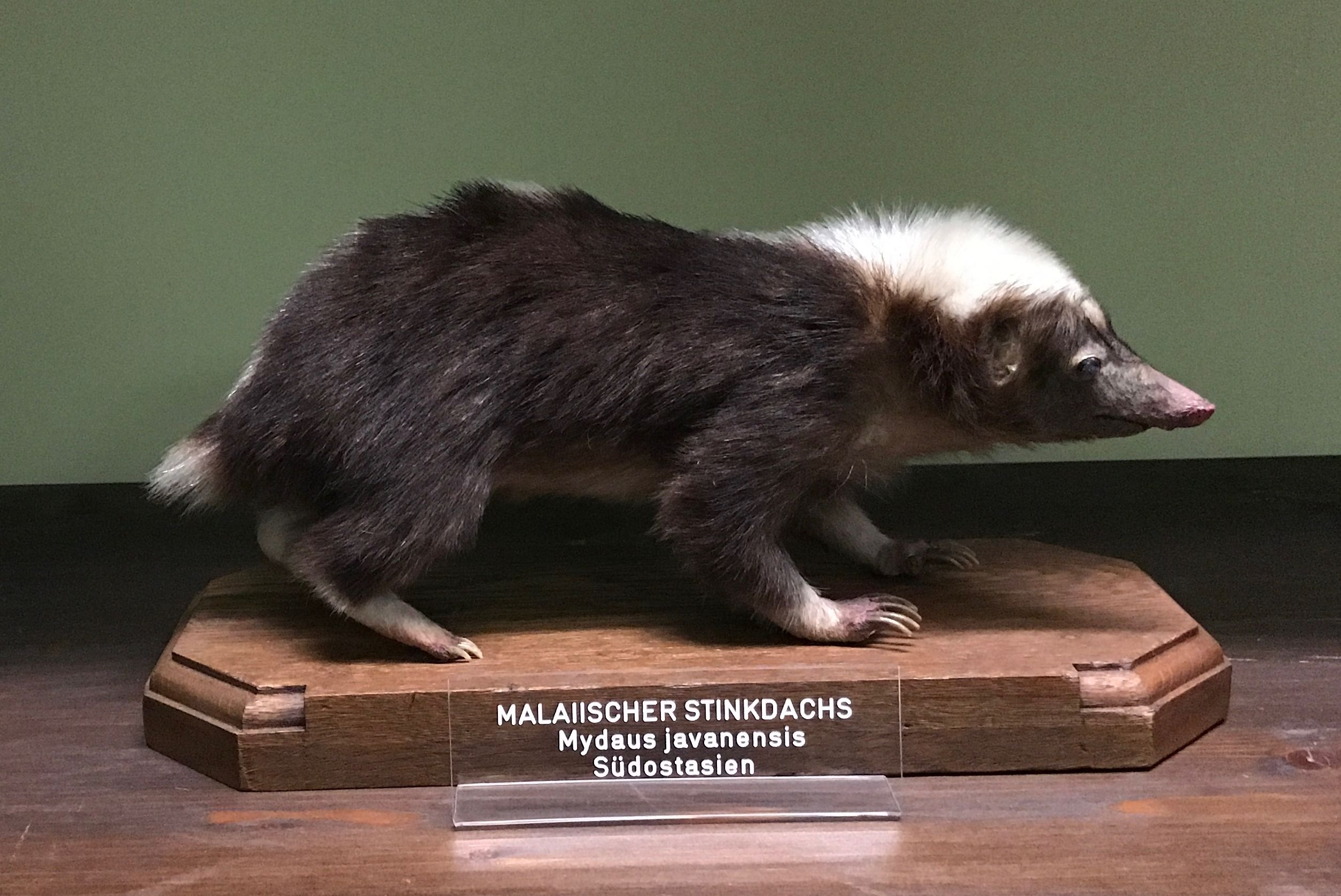
Mydaus javanensis

Sunda stink badgers have a similar body shape to badgers, but are significantly smaller, being 37 to 52 cm (15 to 20 in) in total length, and weighing from 1.3 to 3.6 kg (2.9 to 7.9 lb). Their fur is coarse, and black or very dark brown over most of the body, with a white stripe running from the top of the head to the tail. The tail is short, measuring about 3.6 cm (1.4 in), and is covered in pure white fur. The width of the stripe varies considerably between individuals, but is usually narrow, and may be discontinuous. As the name indicates, stink badgers have an anal scent gland that secretes a foul-smelling substance, which the animal can spray up to 15 cm (5.9 in). Females have six teats.

== Distribution and habitat ==
The Sunda stink badger is distributed in Java, Sumatra, Borneo, and the northern Natuna Islands and inhabits forest edges or areas of secondary forest. Historically, it was thought to be restricted to elevations of over 2,000 m (6,600 ft), and only rarely on lowland plains. More recent surveys revealed that it also occurs well below 2000 m. It was reported as low as 250 m (820 ft) on Java, at low elevations in Sarawak, and at 10 m (33 ft) in the Lower Kinabatangan floodplains in Sabah.

== Taxonomy ==
The Sunda stink badger was first described by Anselme Gaëtan Desmarest in 1820 based on a zoological specimen sent by Jean-Baptiste Leschenault de La Tour from Java. Three subspecies are recognized:

- M. j. javanensis on Java and Sumatra
- M. j. lucifer on Borneo
- M. j. ollula on Natuna Islands

== Behaviour and ecology ==
The Sunda stink badger is omnivorous and highly nocturnal. Its diet consists of invertebrates, eggs, and carrion. At night, it roots through soft soil using its snout and claws searching for worms and ground-dwelling insects. During the day, it sleeps in short burrows, less than 60 cm (24 in) in length, which it either digs or takes over from other animals, such as porcupines. Females have been reported to give birth to litters of two or three young.
