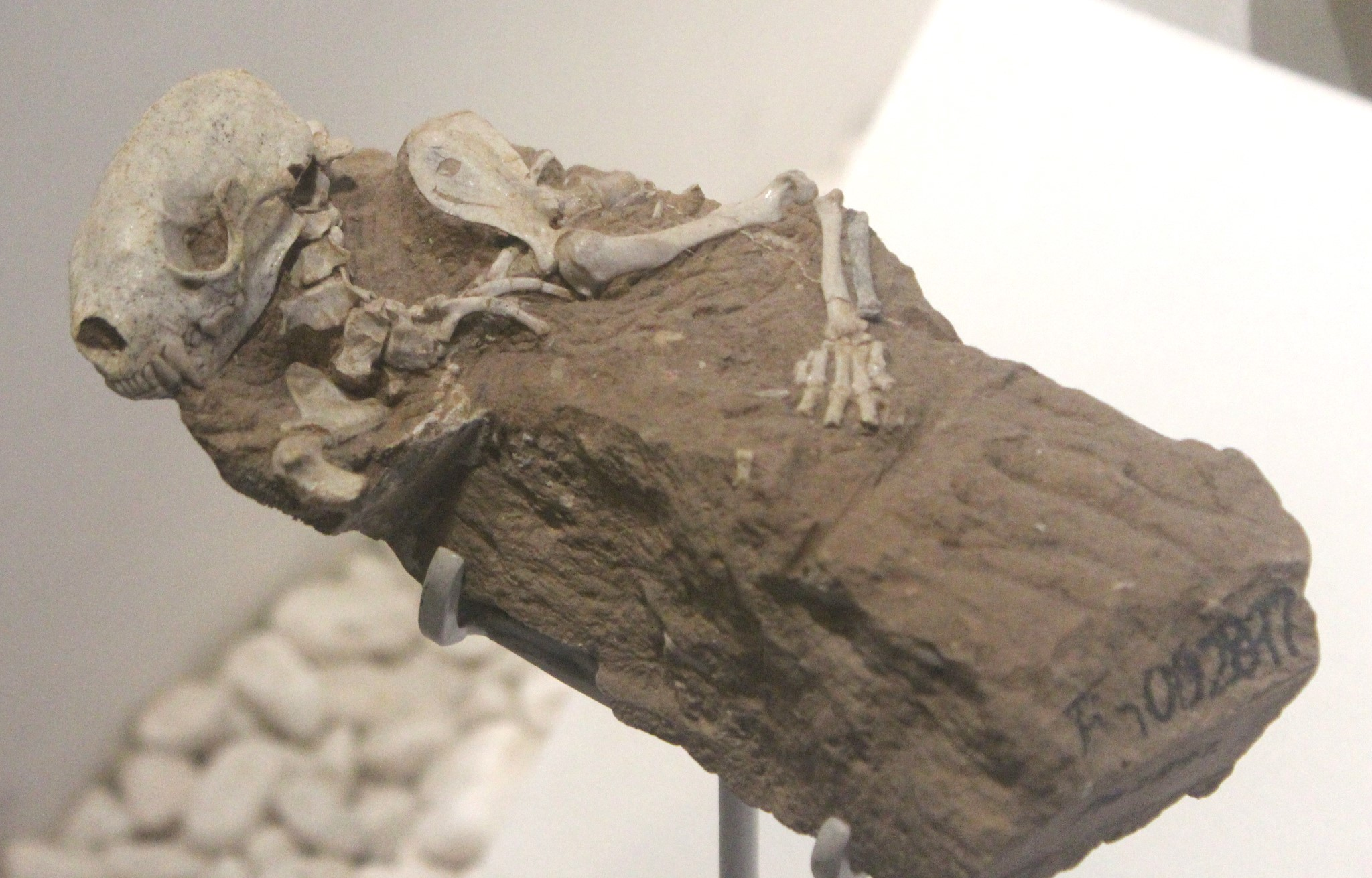
- Skeleton of Promephitis sp., National Natural History Museum of China

Scientific classification
- Kingdom: Animalia
- Phylum: Chordata
- Class: Mammalia
- Order: Carnivora
- Family: Mephitidae
- Genus: Promephitis; Gaudry, 1861

= Promephitis =

Promephitis Temporal range: Miocene - Pliocene 9.3–4.9 Ma

Extinct genus of carnivores

Promephitis is an extinct genus of mephitid, of which several species have been described from the Miocene and Pliocene epochs of Europe and Asia.

== Characteristics ==
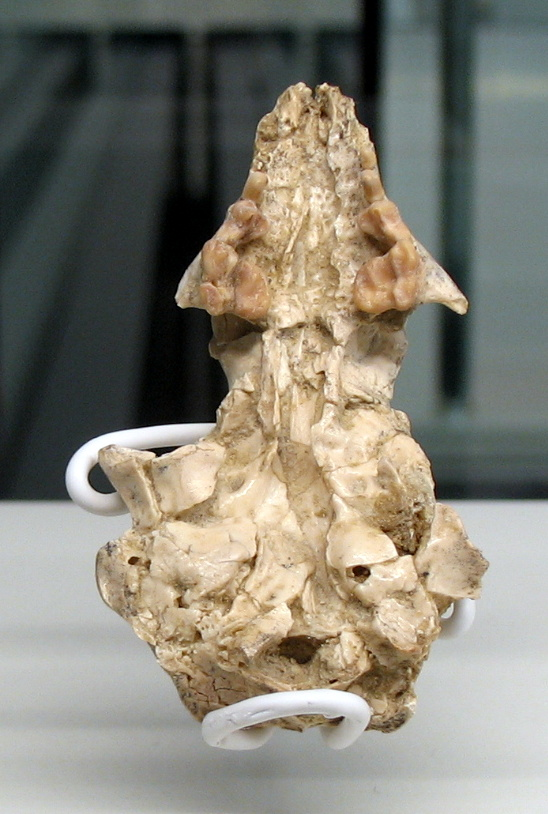
Promephitis sp. skull from Cerro de los Batallones (Spain)

The fossil remains of the Promephitis species, like all members of the skunk family Mephitidae, have a significant extension of epitympanic recess, a chamber of the middle ear, into the region of mastoid and squamous parts of the temporal bones. This extension is recognizable as an inflated bulge on the lateral wall of the skull over the mastoid. In addition, skunks have specific characteristics of the teeth, especially the molars, which distinguish them from other carnivora. The genus Promephitis also shows a distinctive structure of the premolar tooth P^{4} as well as a very small P^{2}, through which they are distinguishable from other genera.

== Distribution and temporal classification ==
Species of Promephitis ranged widely in Eurasia, and fossils have been found both in Europe and in Asia. Fossils of the genus have been uncovered in Spain, Ukraine, Romania, Moldova, Bulgaria, Greece, and China. They lived during the Neogene period, occurring in the Middle to Late Miocene and Early Pliocene less than 10 million years ago.

== Taxonomy ==
The genus and the type species Promephitis larteti were described in 1861 by Jean Albert Gaudry from a fossil found at Pikermi in Greece. Since the initial description up to 10 species have been named, but some have since been discarded. Early finds consisted mainly of teeth or fragments of jaw bones. In 2004 Wang & Qiu reported numerous well-preserved skull and skeleton finds from China and described two new species. Currently the following eleven species are recognised:

- Skunks
  - - † Palaeomephitis
    - - † Promephitis
      - Stink badgers (Mydaus)
  - other Mephitidae

- Promephitis larteti Gaudry 1861
- P. maeotica Alexjew 1916
- P. alexjewi Schlosser 1924
- P. malustensis Simionescu 1930
- P. majori Pilgrim 1933
- P. hootoni Senyurek 1954
- P. pristinidens Petter 1963
- P. brevirostris Meladze 1967
- P. maxima He and Huang 1991
- P. qinensis Wang and Qiu 2004
- P. parvus Wang and Qiu 2004

Within the skunks, the species of the genus Promephitis have been likened to the two extant species of stink badger (Mydaus) from Southeast Asia. Taken together, Promephitis and the stink badgers are probably the sister group of the fossil species Palaeomephitis steinheimensis, the name applied to the oldest known species of skunks. Within the recent genera, the stink badgers represent the earliest genus; the clade comprising them with Promephitis and Palaeomephitis is considered to be a sister group to all other skunks living today and other fossil forms.
