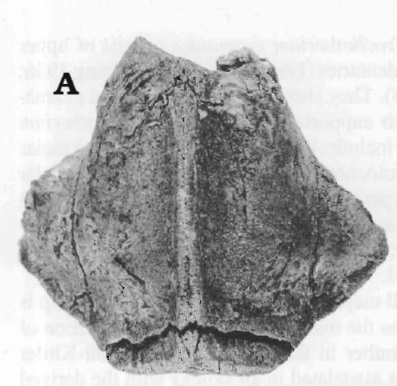

Scientific classification
- Domain: Eukaryota
- Kingdom: Animalia
- Phylum: Chordata
- Class: Mammalia
- Order: Carnivora
- Family: Mephitidae
- Genus: Palaeomephitis; Jäger, 1839
- Species: P. steinheimensis

Binomial name
- Palaeomephitis steinheimensis Jäger, 1839

Synonyms
- Trochotherium cyamoides Fraas, 1870

= Palaeomephitis =

Palaeomephitis Temporal range: Middle Miocene ca. 12 Ma

Extinct genus of carnivores

Palaeomephitis steinheimensis is an extinct species of musteloid, possibly a mephitid (skunk), from the Miocene epoch of Europe.

== Description ==
Palaeomephitis steinheimensis was described by Jäger in 1839 from a well-preserved cranium found in Steinheim am Albuch in Baden-Württemberg, southern Germany. Subsequently, different authors considered it to represent a viverrid or a leptarctine mustelid. It was placed in the Mephitinae (now considered to be a distinct family) by Wolsan in 1999, on the evidence of its having an extended epitympanic recess to the middle ear. However, Geraads and Spassov (2016) were uncertain it in fact had this expanded recess, since that area of the skull is imperfectly preserved. Due to this and other factors, such as it differing from Mephitidae in some characters, these authors considered the mephitid affinities of Palaeomephitis doubtful.

== Taxonomy ==
- Skunks
  - - † Palaeomephitis
    - - † Promephitis
      - Stink badgers (Mydaus)
  - other Mephitidae

In its traditional skunk classification, Palaeomephitis is considered to stand close to the two extant species of stink badger (Mydaus) and the several extinct species of Promephitis. This clade is considered to be a sister group to all other skunks living today and other fossil forms.
