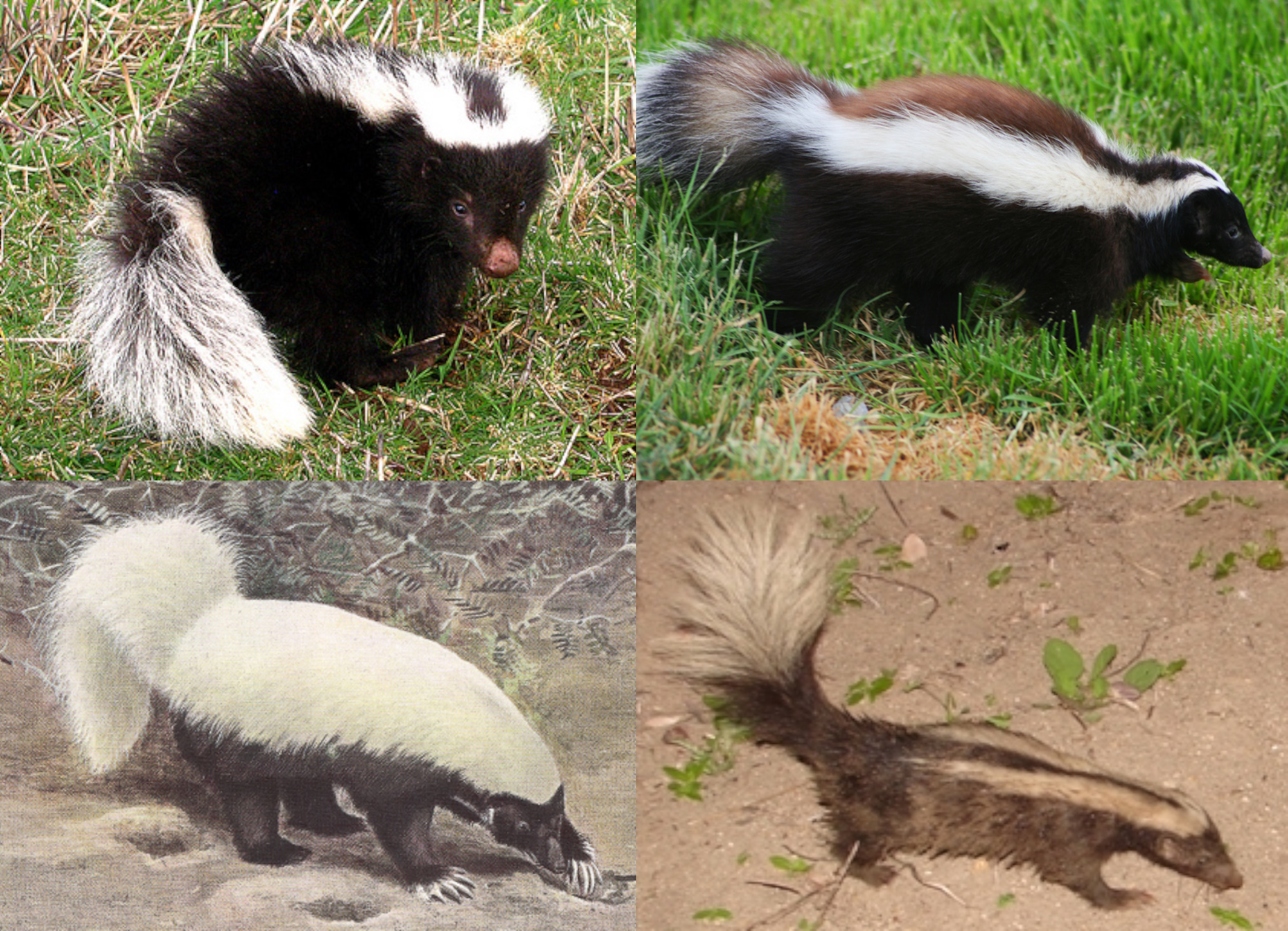
- Molina's hog-nosed skunk (C. chinga), Humboldt's hog-nosed skunk (C. humboldtii), American hog-nosed skunk (C. leuconotus) and striped hog-nosed skunk (C. semistriatus).

Scientific classification
- Kingdom: Animalia
- Phylum: Chordata
- Class: Mammalia
- Order: Carnivora
- Suborder: Caniformia
- Family: Mephitidae
- Genus: Conepatus; Gray, 1837

Type species
- Conepatus humboldtii Gray, 1837

Species
- C. chinga range for Molinaxx; C. humboldtii rangl Humboldt; C. leuconotus rang American; C. semistriatus range striped
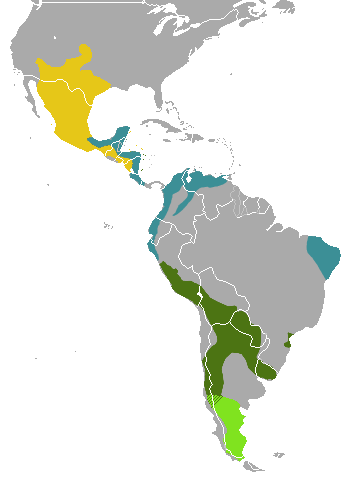
- Conepatus ranges

= Hog-nosed skunk =

Genus of carnivores

The hog-nosed skunks belong to the genus Conepatus and are members of the family Mephitidae (skunks). They are native to the Americas. They have white backs and tails and black underparts.

== Species ==
Image	Scientific name	Common name	Distribution
	Conepatus chinga	Molina's hog-nosed skunk	Chile, Peru, northern Argentina, Bolivia, Paraguay, Uruguay, and southern Brazil
	Conepatus humboldtii	Humboldt's hog-nosed skunk	Patagonian regions of South Argentina
	Conepatus leuconotus	American hog-nosed skunk	Texas, New Mexico, Arizona, Mexico, Guatemala, Honduras, Nicaragua
	Conepatus semistriatus	Striped hog-nosed skunk	southern Mexico to northern Peru, and in the extreme east of Brazil

=== Extinct species ===
†Conepatus robustus
†Conepatus sanmiguelensis
†Conepatus suffocans

Work in 2003 concluded that the western hog-nosed skunk or common hog-nosed skunk (formerly Conepatus mesoleucus) is the same species as the American hog-nosed skunk, and that Conepatus leuconotus is the correct name of the merged populations.

== Description ==
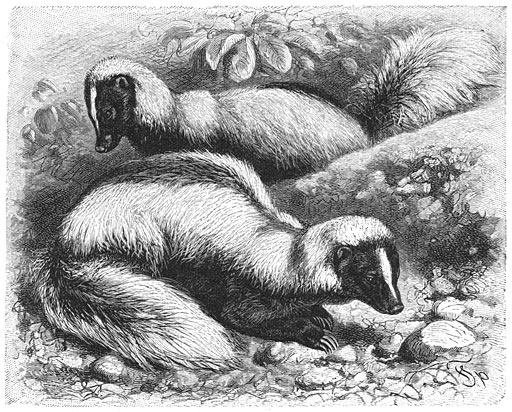
Conepatus humboldtii

The individual hog-nosed skunk species vary in size, but among them is included the largest of all skunks. All are characterized by comparatively short hair, especially on the tail, and this appendage lacks the plumelike appearance observed in other skunks. The nose is prolonged into a distinct "snout", naked on the top and sides and evidently used for rooting in the earth after the manner of a pig as their name implies. In addition, the front feet are armed with long, heavy claws. The claws are well developed for digging up insect prey, and the front legs and shoulders are provided with a strong muscular development for digging, as in a badger. This likeness has led to the use in some places of the appropriate name "badger skunk" for these animals. The extent of the stripe on the hind of the skunk, and the color of the tail underside suggests a distinction between eastern and western species. The eastern species is a narrow stripe, with black under the base of the tail. The western distinction is a wide stripe, with a predominantly white tail. The hair on these skunks is coarse and harsh, lacking the qualities which render the coats of their northern relatives so valuable. They are nocturnal.

Before the merge of the American hog-nosed skunks, the eastern hog-nosed skunk, Conepatus leuconotus is typically larger than the western hog-nosed skunk, Conepatus mesoleucus. Female eastern hog-nosed skunks range from 58 to 74 cm in length and 19–34 cm in height. They weigh between 2.0 and 4.0 kg. Male hog-nosed skunks range from 56 to 92 cm in length and 22–41 cm in height. They weigh on average between 3.0 and 4.5 kg. The western hog-nosed skunk ranged from 40 to 84 cm in length, 13–35 cm in height, and 1.1–2.7 kg. Males are larger than females and can occasionally reach 4.5 kg. The teeth are smaller in C. mesoleucus than in C. leuconotus.

The anal sac secretion of the hog-nosed skunk, Conepatus mesoleucus, had two major volatile components, (E)-2-butene-1-thiol and (E)-S-2-butenyl thioacetate. Minor volatile components identified from this secretion were phenylmethanethiol, 2-methylquinoline, 2-quinolinemethanethiol, and bis[(E)-2-butenyl] disulfide. 3-Methyl-l-butanethiol, a major component in the defensive spray of the striped skunk, hooded skunk and the spotted skunk was absent from this secretion.

== Range ==
The eastern hog-nosed skunk is found only in Southern Texas, Veracruz, Mexico, and Arizona The Molina hog-nosed skunk, also known as the Andean hog-nosed skunk (C. chinga), is found in Argentina, Bolivia, Brazil, Chile, Peru, and Uruguay. Humboldt's hog-nosed skunk, also known as the Patagonian hog-nosed skunk (C. humboldtii) finds its habitat in the open grassy areas in the Patagonian regions of Chile and Argentina The western hog-nosed skunk (C. mesoleucus) is found in, Texas, Arizona, New Mexico, Sierra Guadalupe, Coahuila, Colima, Honduras, Sonora, and Nicaragua. The striped hog-nosed skunk, C. semistriatus, is found in Veracruz, Costa Rica, and Guatemala.

== Habitat ==
Where their range coincides with that of the common skunks, the local distribution of the two is practically the same. They live along the bottom-lands of watercourses, where vegetation is abundant and the supply of food most plentiful, or in canyons and on rocky mountain slopes.

For their protection hog-nosed skunks create their own burrows, generally within a bank, or beneath a rock, or the roots of a tree, but do not hesitate to take possession of the deserted burrows of other animals, or of natural cavities among the rocks. Owing to their strictly nocturnal habits, they are generally much less frequently seen than the common skunks, even in localities where they are numerous. Sightings are recorded from brush habitat and semi-open grasslands. Habitats may also include rocky terrain and stream beds in desert-scrub and mesquite grassland.

Infrequent sightings of the American hog-nosed skunk raise concerns over its conservation status.

== Feeding habits ==
Although both the spotted skunks and common skunks live mainly on insects, the hog-nosed skunks are even more insectivorous in their feeding habits. The bare snout appears to be used constantly for the purpose of rooting out beetles, beetle larvae (or grubs), and larvae of various insects from the ground.
