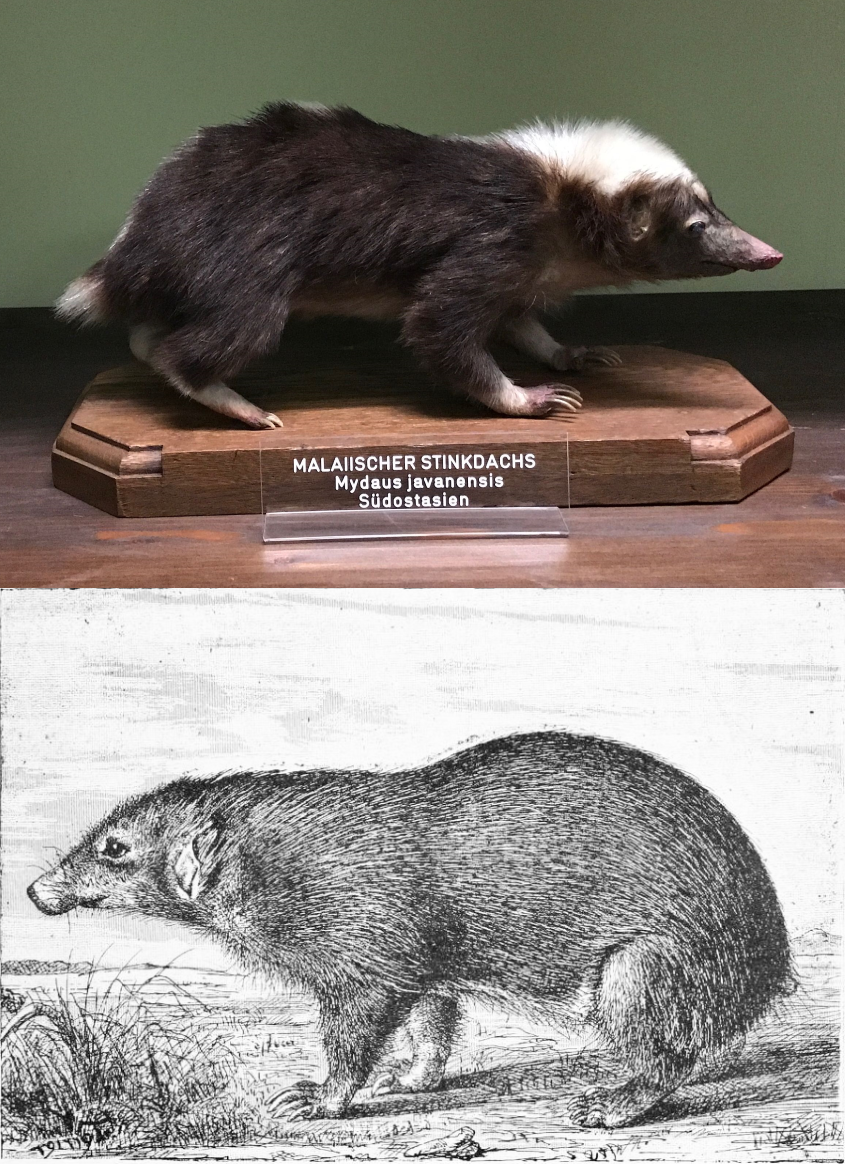
- Sunda stink badger (M. javanensis) and Palawan stink badger (M. marchei)

Scientific classification
- Kingdom: Animalia
- Phylum: Chordata
- Class: Mammalia
- Order: Carnivora
- Family: Mephitidae
- Genus: Mydaus; Cuvier, 1821

Type species
- Mydaus meliceps

Species
- M. marchei; M. javanensis
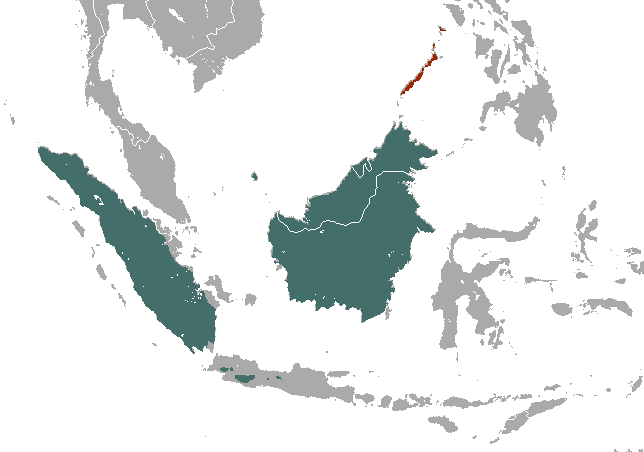
- Mydaus ranges

= Stink badger =

Stink badgers

Genus of carnivores

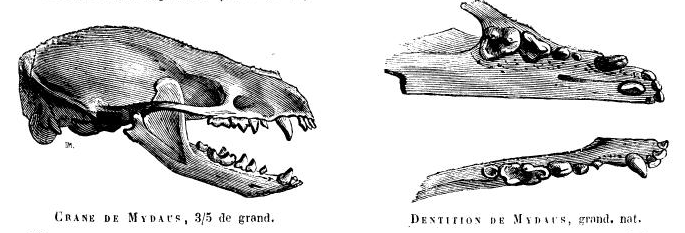
Skull and dentition, as illustrated in Gervais' Histoire naturelle des mammifères

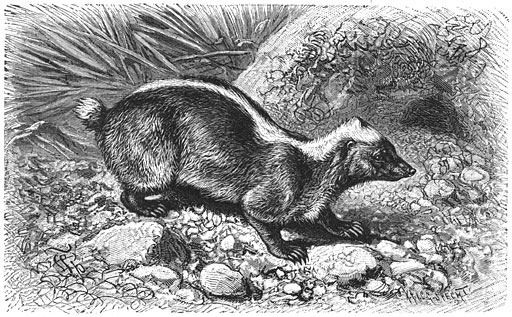
Mydaus javanensis

Stink badgers or false badgers are the species of the genus Mydaus of the skunk family of carnivorans, the Mephitidae. They resemble the better-known members of the family Mustelidae also termed 'badgers' (which are themselves a polyphyletic group). There are two extant species – the Palawan stink badger or pantot (M. marchei), and the Sunda stink badger or teledu (M. javanensis). They live west of the Wallace Line; the Sunda species on islands of the Greater Sunda Islands, being Sumatra, Java, and Borneo; in Borneo the badger is found in Indonesia, Malaysia and Brunei. The Palawan species lives in the Philippine island of Palawan as well as the islands surrounding it.

Stink badgers are named for their resemblance to other badgers and for the foul-smelling secretions that they expel from anal glands in self-defense. The secretions are stronger in the Sunda stink badger.

Stink badgers were traditionally thought to be related to Eurasian badgers in the subfamily Melinae of the weasel family of carnivorans (the Mustelidae). However, DNA analysis indicates they share a more recent common ancestor with skunks. As a result, stink badgers are now placed in the skunk family (the Mephitidae, which is the sister group of a clade composed of Mustelidae and Procyonidae, with the red panda also assigned to one of the sister clades). The two existing species are different enough from each other for the Palawan stink badger to be sometimes classified in its own genus, Suillotaxus.
