= List of mammals of Mexico =

This is a list of the native wild mammal species recorded in Mexico. As of September 2014, there were 536 mammalian species or subspecies listed. Based on IUCN data, Mexico has 23% more noncetacean mammal species than the U.S. and Canada combined in an area only 10% as large, or a species density over 12 times that of its northern neighbors. (Note: As of 2014-05-10, the IUCN lists 491 noncetacean species for Mexico (area 1,972,550 km^{2}) and 398 for the U.S. plus Canada (area 19,811,345 km^{2}).) Mexico's high mammal biodiversity is in part a reflection of the wide array of biomes present over its latitudinal, climatic and altitudinal ranges, from lowland tropical rainforest to temperate desert to montane forest to alpine tundra. The general increase in terrestrial biodiversity moving towards the equator is another important factor in the comparison. Mexico includes much of the Mesoamerican and Madrean pine-oak woodlands biodiversity hotspots. From a biogeographic standpoint, most of Mexico is linked to the rest of North America as part of the Nearctic realm. However, the lowlands of southern Mexico are linked with Central America and South America as part of the Neotropical realm. Extensive mixing of Nearctic and Neotropical mammal species commenced only three million years ago, when the formation of the Isthmus of Panama ended South America's long period of isolation and precipitated the Great American Interchange. Twenty of Mexico's extant nonflying species (opossums, armadillos, anteaters, monkeys and caviomorph rodents) are of South American origin. Most of the megafauna that formerly inhabited the region became extinct at the end of the Pleistocene about 10,000 years ago, shortly after the arrival of the first humans. Increasing alteration and destruction of natural habitats by expanding human populations during the last several centuries is causing further attrition of the region's biodiversity, as exemplified by the "hotspot" designations (by definition, such areas have lost over 70% of their primary vegetation).

The following tags are used to highlight each species' conservation status as assessed by the International Union for Conservation of Nature; those on the left are used here, those in the second column in some other articles:

EX	EX	Extinct	No reasonable doubt that the last individual has died.
EW	EW	Extinct in the wild	Known only to survive in captivity or as a naturalized population well outside its historic range.
CR	CR	Critically endangered	The species is in imminent danger of extinction in the wild.
EN	EN	Endangered	The species is facing a very high risk of extinction in the wild.
VU	VU	Vulnerable	The species is facing a high risk of extinction in the wild.
NT	NT	Near threatened	The species does not qualify as being at high risk of extinction but is likely to do so in the future.
LC	LC	Least concern	The species is not currently at risk of extinction in the wild.
DD	DD	Data deficient	There is inadequate information to assess the risk of extinction for this species.
NE	NE	Not evaluated	The conservation status of the species has not been studied.

Of the listed taxa, 7 are extinct, 1 (not recognized by the IUCN) is possibly extinct, 30 are critically endangered, 46 are endangered, 26 are vulnerable, and 23 are near threatened. (Note: This list is derived from the IUCN Red List which lists species of mammals and includes those mammals that have recently been classified as extinct (since 1500 AD). The taxonomy and naming of the individual species is based on those used in existing Wikipedia articles as of 21 May 2007 and supplemented by the common names and taxonomy from the IUCN, Smithsonian Institution, or University of Michigan where no Wikipedia article was available.) These status tags were most recently updated in April 2011. Six of the extinct or possibly extinct taxa and 11 of the critically endangered taxa are insular (all but two of these are rodents); another 13 of the critically endangered species (all rodents or shrews) are montane. The only critically endangered species that are neither rodents nor shrews are the Cozumel Island raccoon and the vaquita. The vaquita population estimate has dropped below 100 as of 2014 and it is regarded as being in imminent danger of extinction.

== Subclass: Theria ==
=== Infraclass: Metatheria ===
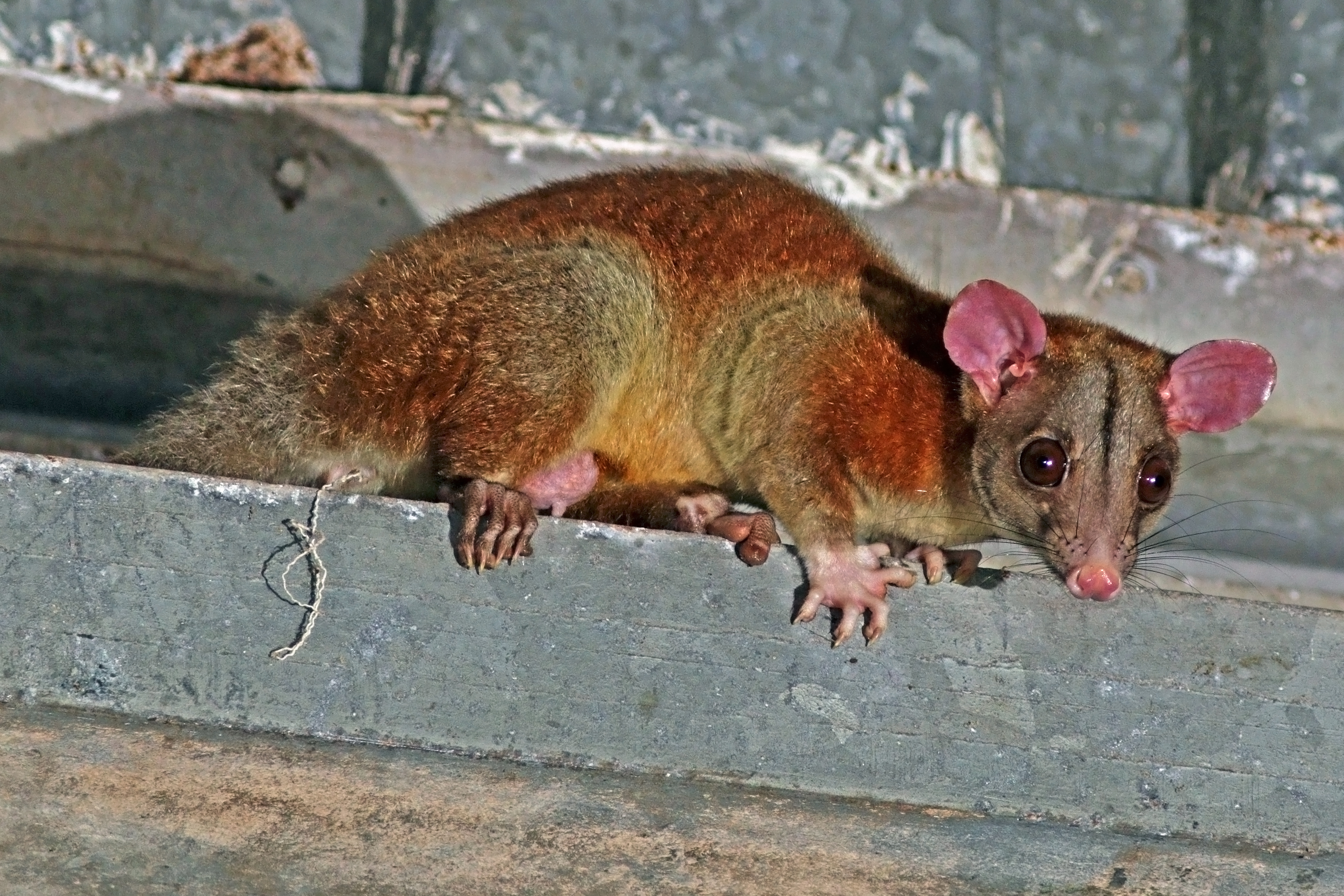
Derby's woolly opossum

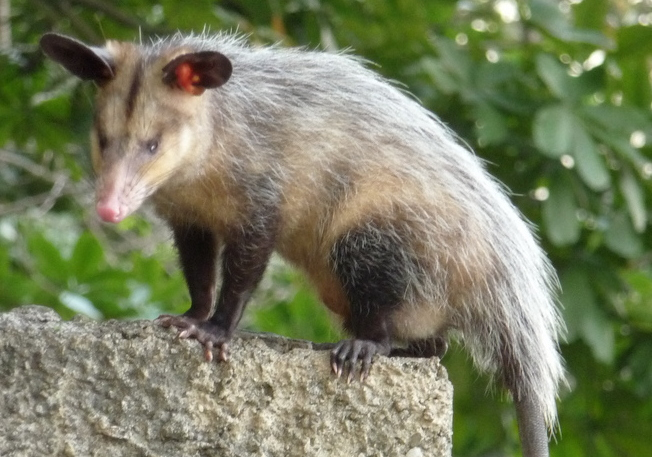
Common opossum

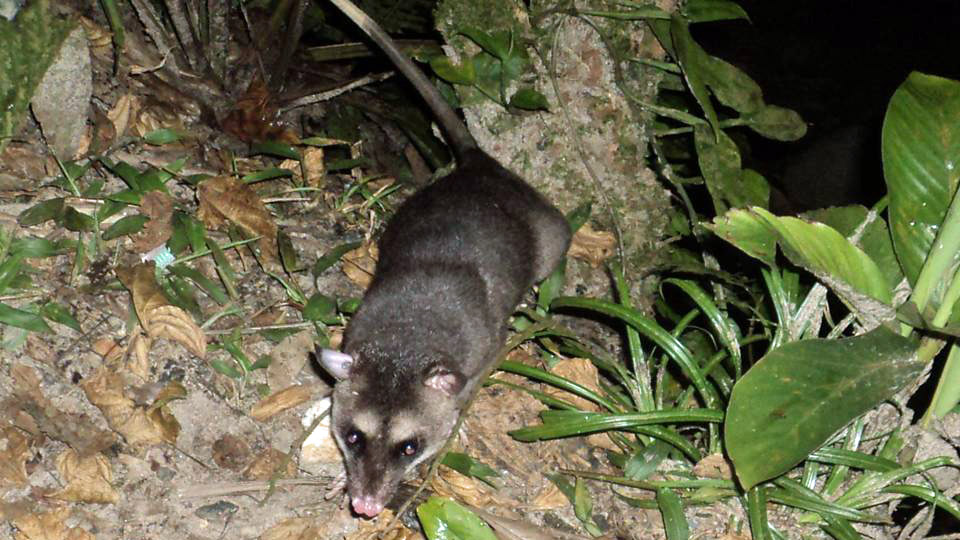
Gray four-eyed opossum

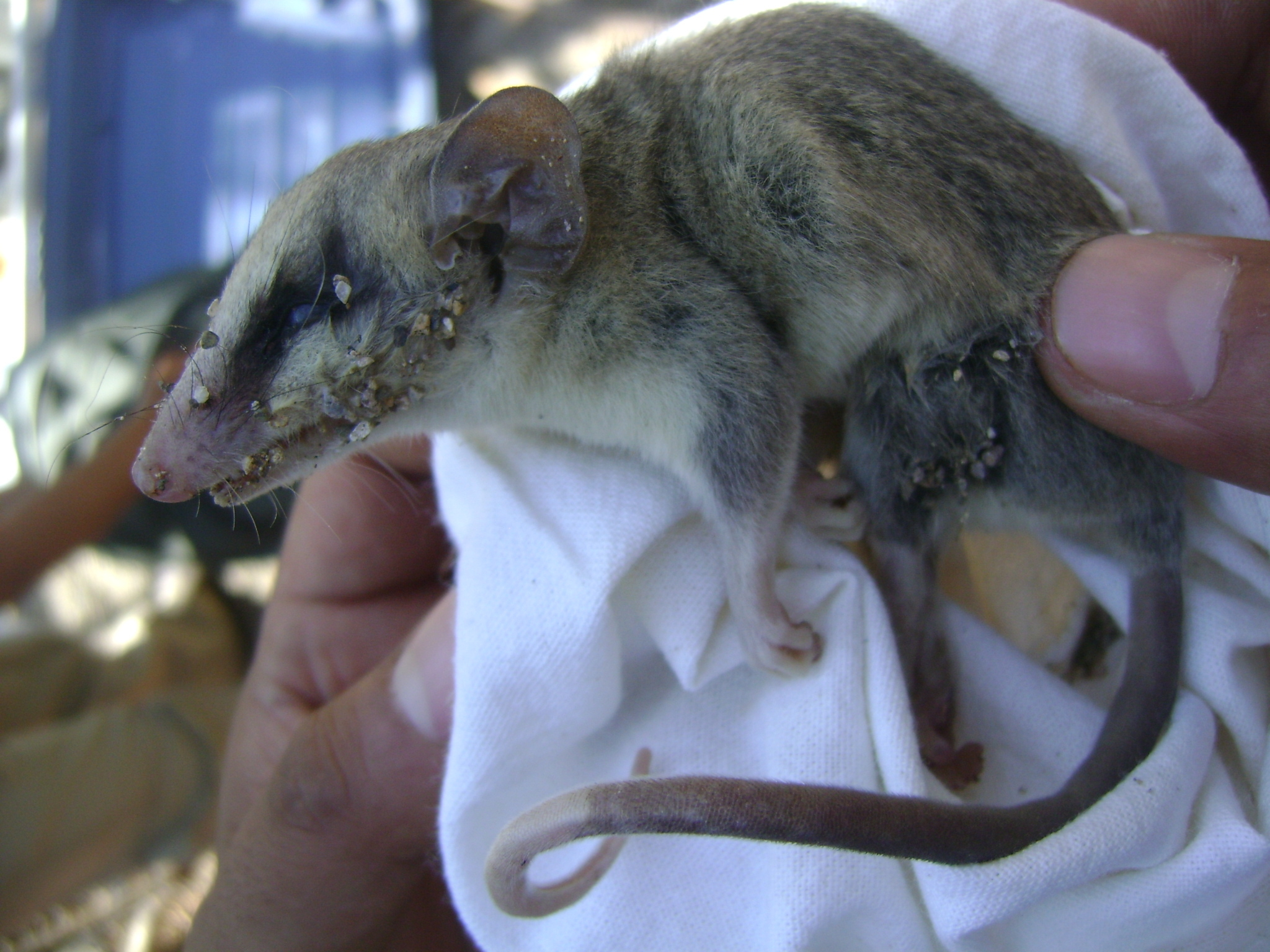
Grayish mouse opossum

==== Order: Didelphimorphia (common opossums) ====
Didelphimorphia is the order of common opossums of the Western Hemisphere. Opossums probably diverged from the basic South American marsupials in the late Cretaceous or early Paleocene. They are small to medium-sized marsupials, about the size of a large house cat, with a long snout and prehensile tail.

- Family: Didelphidae (American opossums)
  - Subfamily: Caluromyinae
    - Genus: Caluromys
      - Derby's woolly opossum, C. derbianus LC
  - Subfamily: Didelphinae
    - Genus: Chironectes
      - Water opossum, C. minimus LC
    - Genus: Didelphis
      - Common opossum, D. marsupialis LC
      - Virginia opossum, D. virginiana LC
    - Genus: Marmosa
      - Mexican mouse opossum, M. mexicana LC
    - Genus: Metachirus
      - Brown four-eyed opossum, M. nudicaudatus LC
    - Genus: Philander
      - Gray four-eyed opossum, P. opossum LC
    - Genus: Tlacuatzin
      - Grayish mouse opossum, T. canescens LC

=== Infraclass: Eutheria ===
==== Order: Sirenia (manatees and dugongs) ====
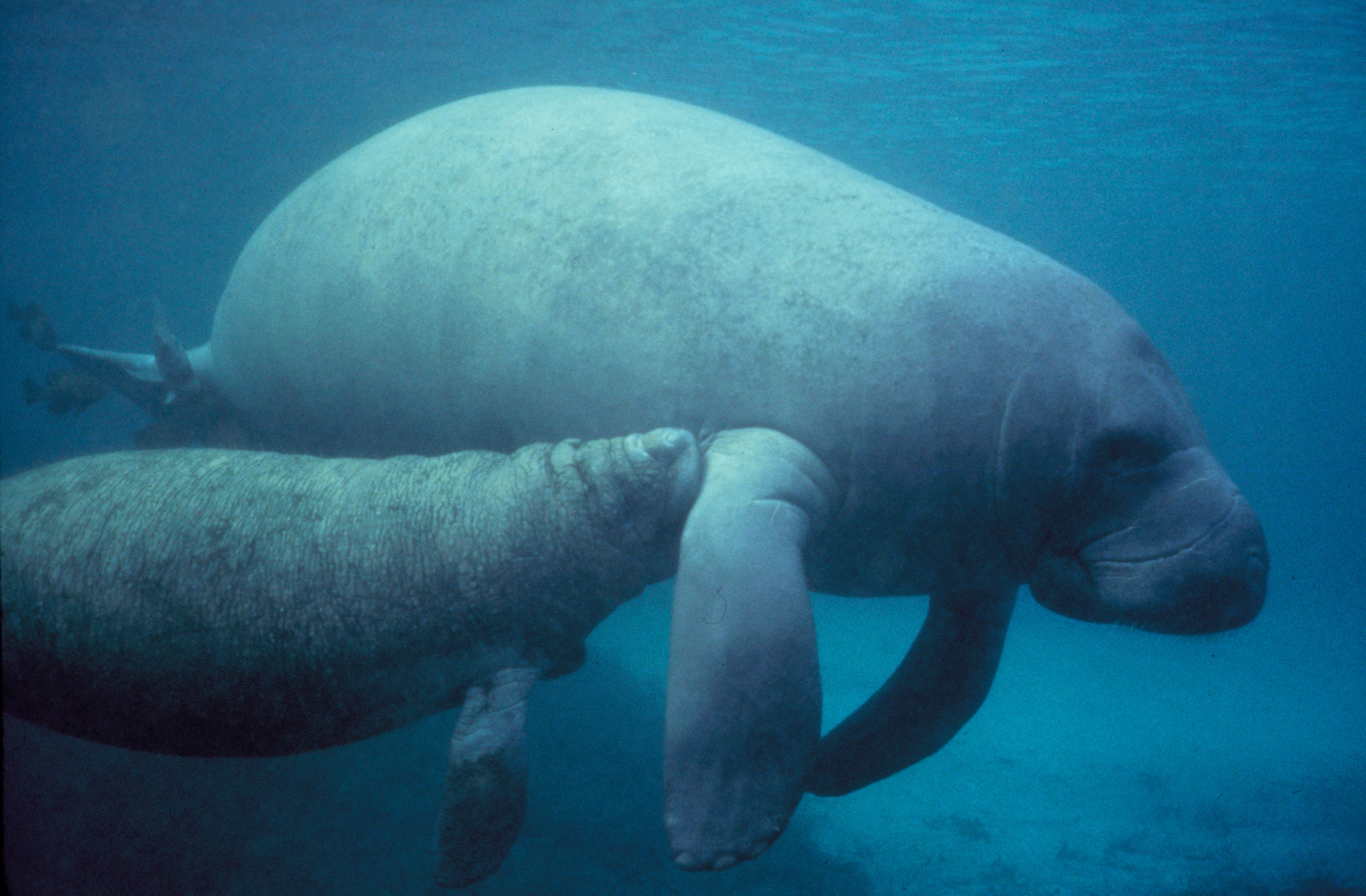
West Indian manatees

Sirenia is an order of fully aquatic, herbivorous mammals that inhabit rivers, estuaries, coastal marine waters, swamps, and marine wetlands. All four species are endangered. They evolved about 50 million years ago, and their closest living relatives are elephants. Manatees are the only extant afrotherians in the Americas. However, a number proboscid species, some of which survived until the arrival of Paleo-Indians, once inhabited the region. Mammoths, mastodons and gomphotheres all formerly lived in Mexico.

- Family: Trichechidae
  - Genus: Trichechus
    - West Indian manatee, T. manatus VU

==== Order: Cingulata (armadillos) ====
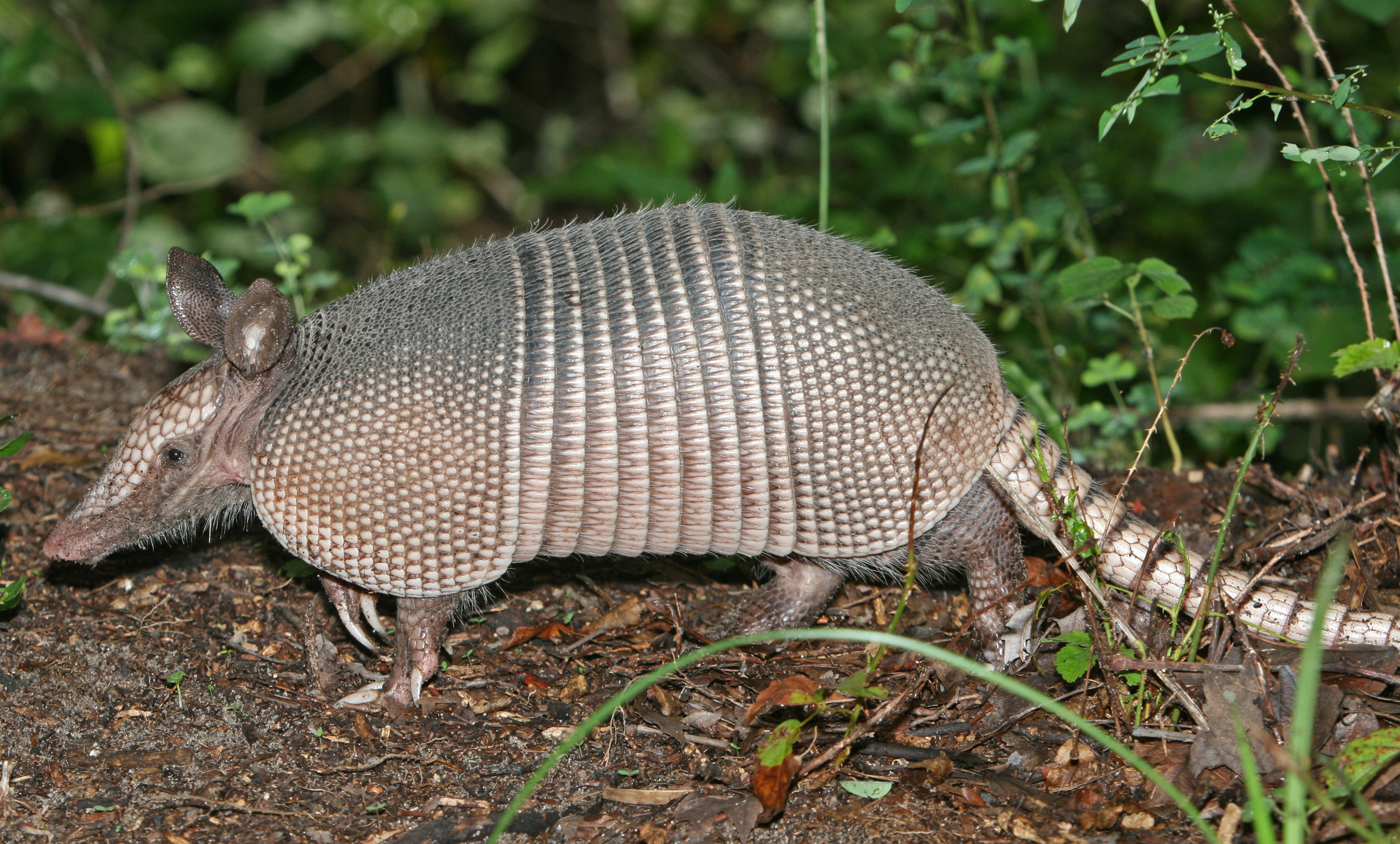
Nine-banded armadillo

Armadillos are small mammals with a bony armored shell. Two of twenty-one extant species are present in Mexico; the remainder are only found in South America, where they originated. Their much larger relatives, the pampatheres and glyptodonts, once lived in North and South America but went extinct following the appearance of humans.

- Family: Dasypodidae (long-nosed armadillos)
  - Subfamily: Dasypodinae
    - Genus: Dasypus
      - Nine-banded armadillo, D. novemcinctus LC
- Family: Chlamyphoridae (armadillos)
  - Subfamily: Tolypeutinae
    - Genus: Cabassous
      - Northern naked-tailed armadillo, C. centralis DD

==== Order: Pilosa (anteaters, sloths and tamanduas) ====
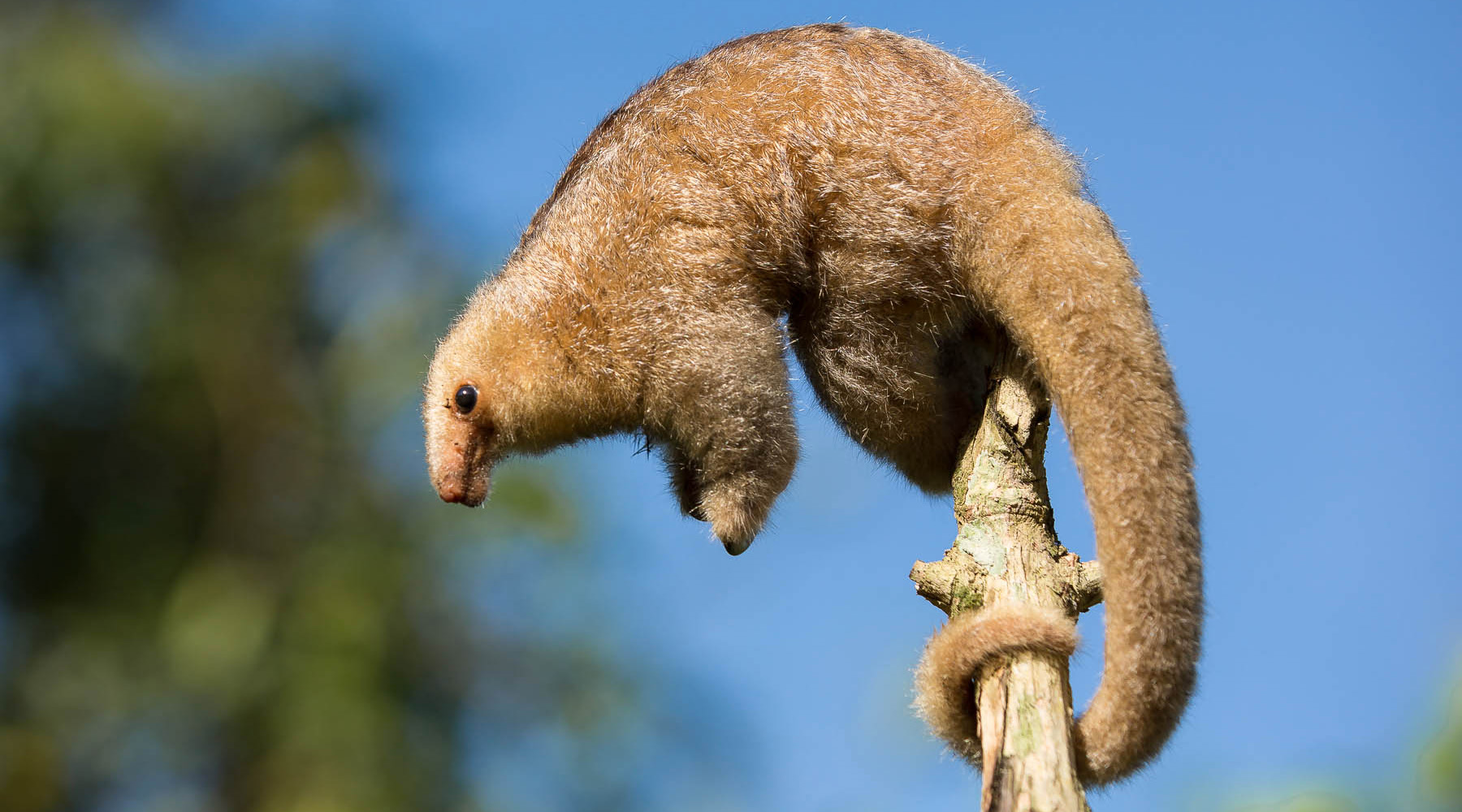
Silky anteater

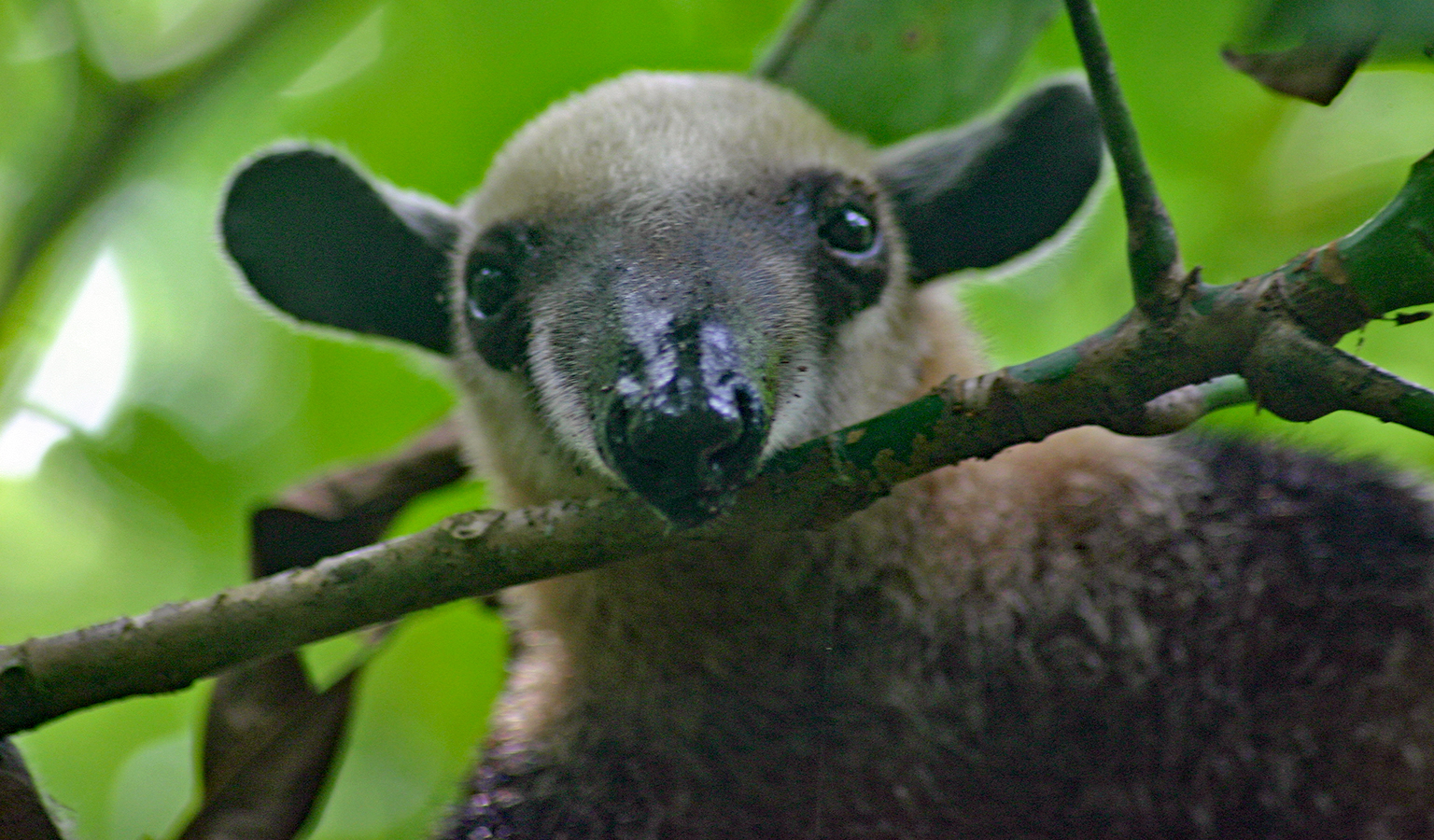
Northern tamandua

The order Pilosa is extant only in the Americas and includes the anteaters, sloths, and tamanduas. Their ancestral home is South America. Numerous ground sloths, some of which reached the size of elephants, were once present in both North and South America, as well as on the Antilles, but all went extinct following the arrival of humans.

- Suborder: Vermilingua
  - Family: Cyclopedidae
    - Genus: Cyclopes
      - Common silky anteater, C. didactylus LC
      - Central American silky anteater, C. dorsalis NE
  - Family: Myrmecophagidae (American anteaters)
    - Genus: Tamandua
      - Northern tamandua, T. mexicana LC

==== Order: Primates ====
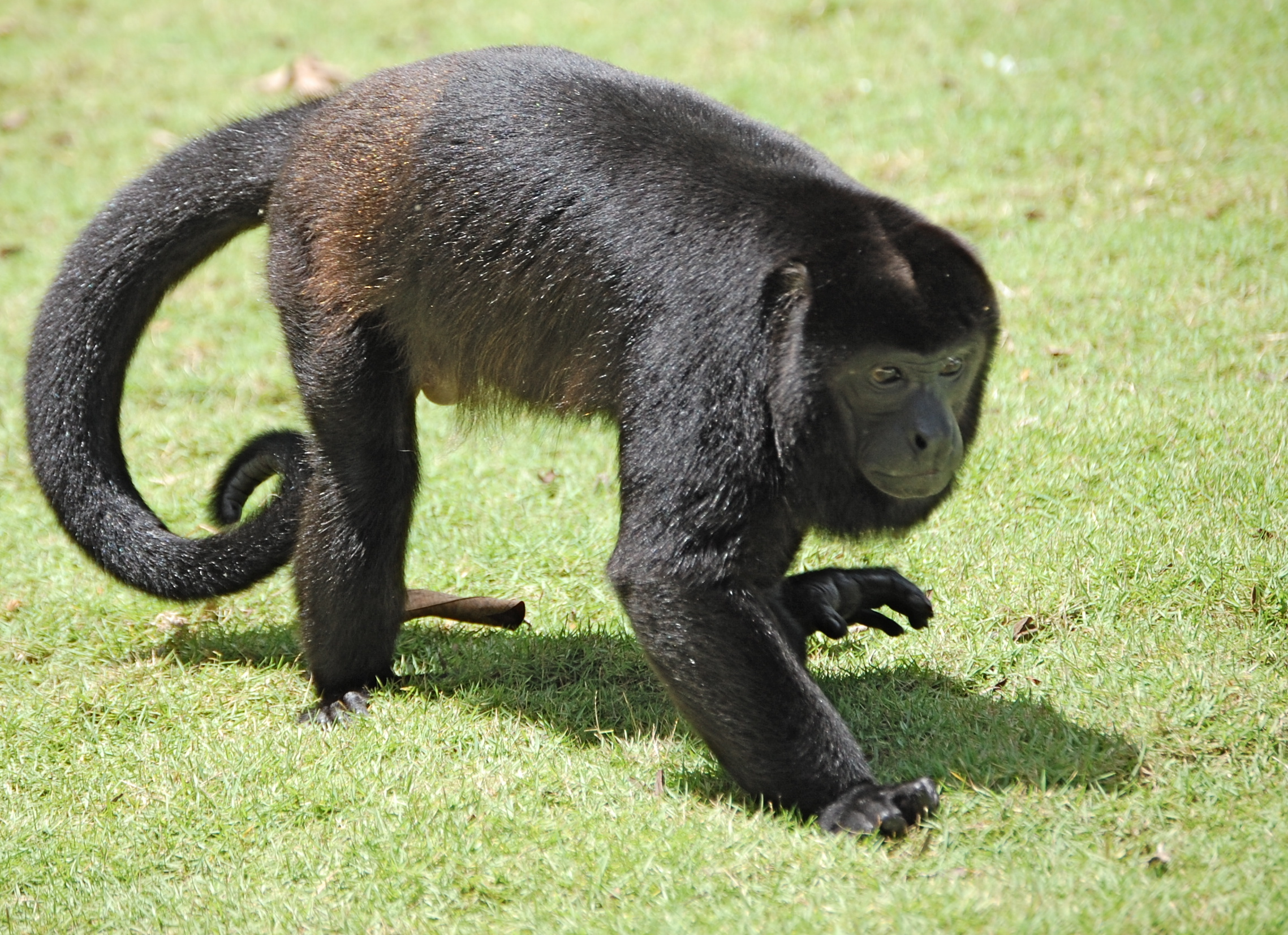
Mantled howler

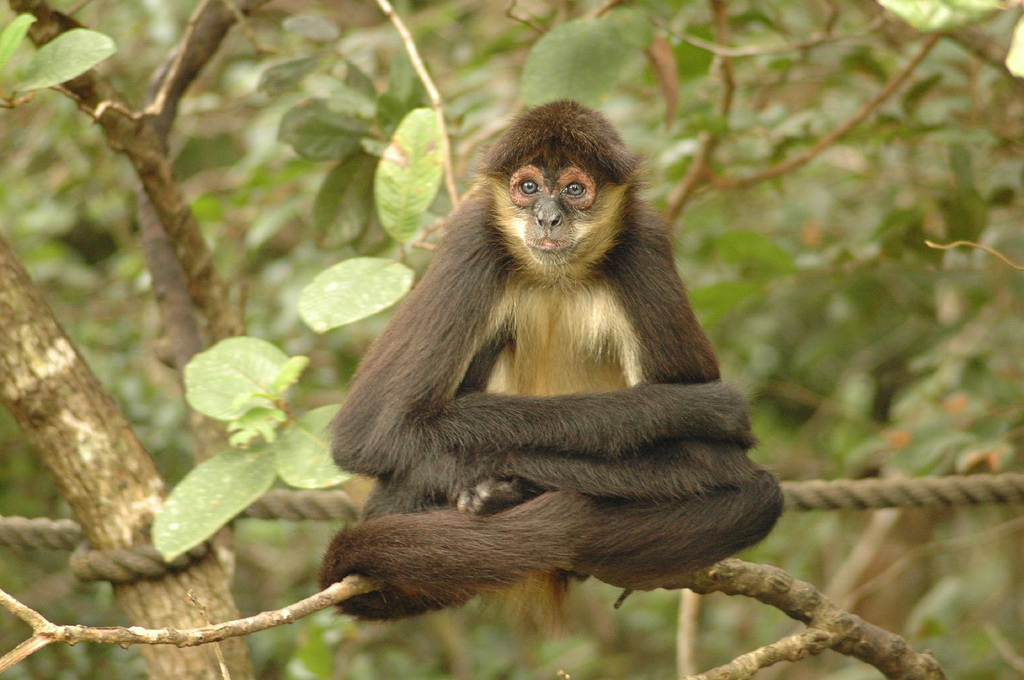
Geoffroy's spider monkey

The order Primates includes the lemurs, monkeys, and apes, with the latter category including humans. It is divided into four main groupings: strepsirrhines, tarsiers, monkeys of the New World (parvorder Platyrrhini), and monkeys and apes of the Old World. Mexico's 2 genera of nonhuman primates compares to 6 in Central America, 20 in South America, 15 in Madagascar, 23 in Africa and 19 in Asia. Mexican and Central American monkeys are recent immigrants from South America, where their ancestors arrived after rafting over from Africa roughly 25 million years ago. Southeastern Mexico is the northernmost limit of the distribution of New World monkeys, which are restricted to tropical rainforest habitat.

- Suborder: Haplorrhini
  - Infraorder: Simiiformes
    - Parvorder: Platyrrhini
      - Family: Atelidae
        - Subfamily: Alouattinae
          - Genus: Alouatta
            - Mantled howler, A. palliata LC
            - Guatemalan black howler, A. pigra EN
        - Subfamily: Atelinae
          - Genus: Ateles
            - Geoffroy's spider monkey, A. geoffroyi EN

==== Order: Rodentia (rodents) ====
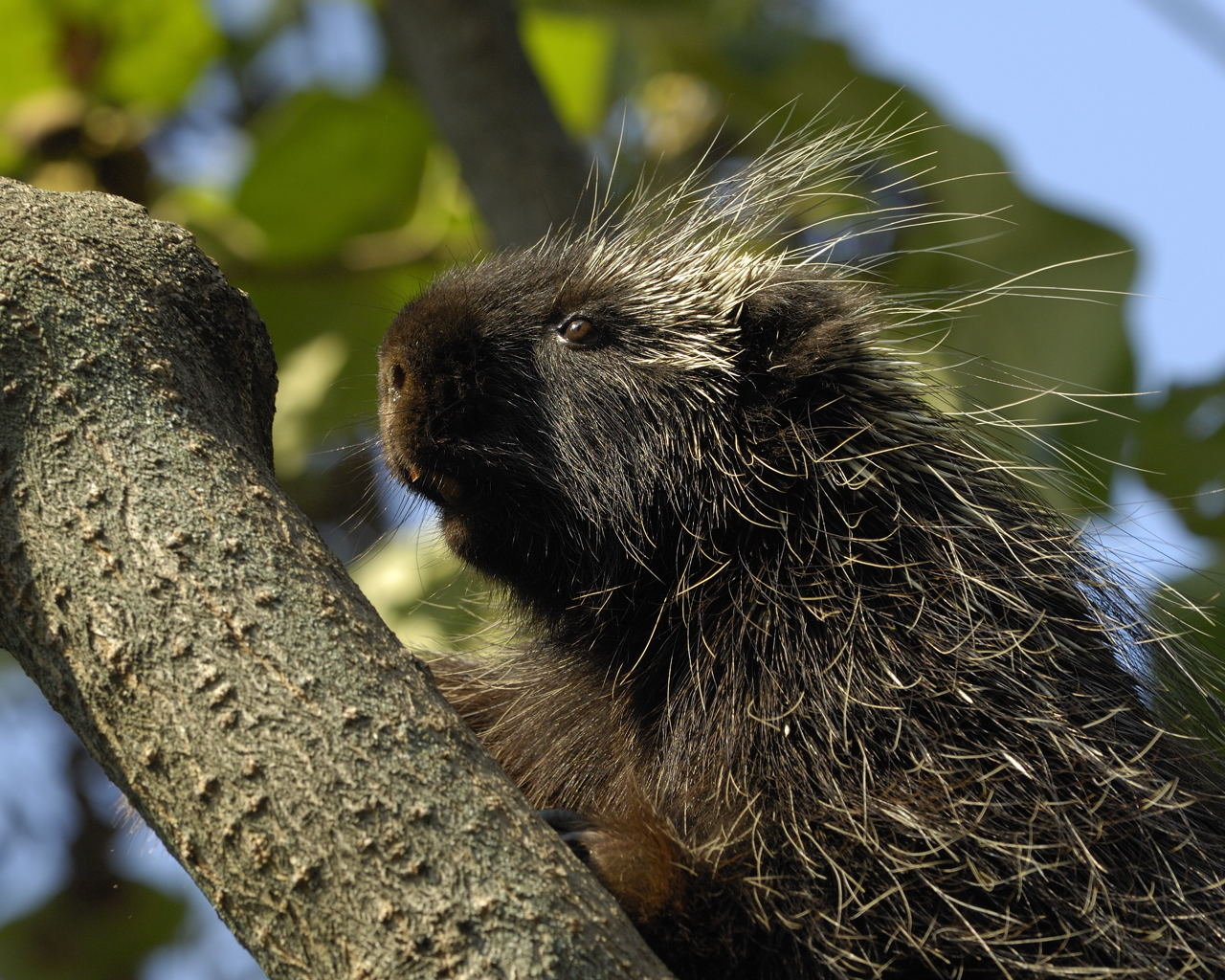
North American porcupine

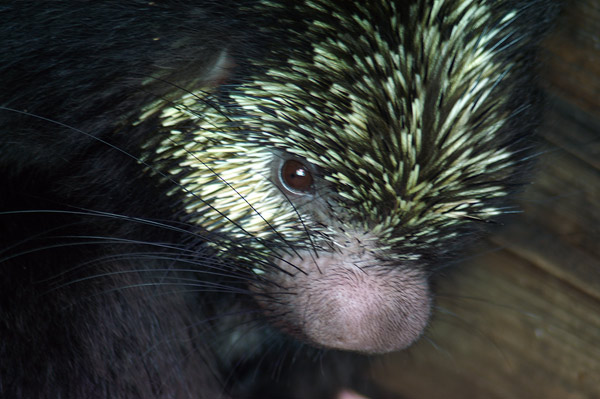
Mexican hairy dwarf porcupine

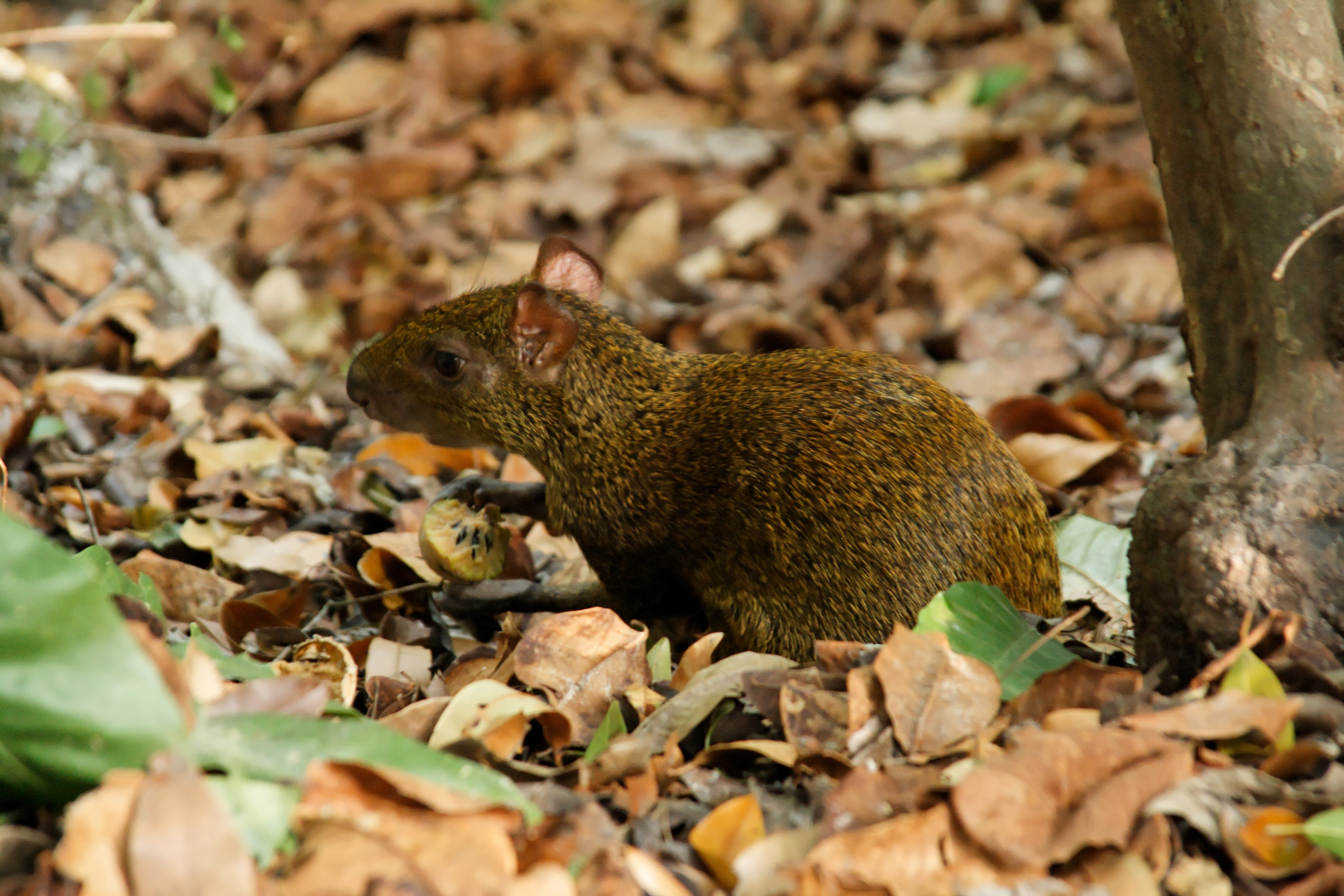
Central American agouti

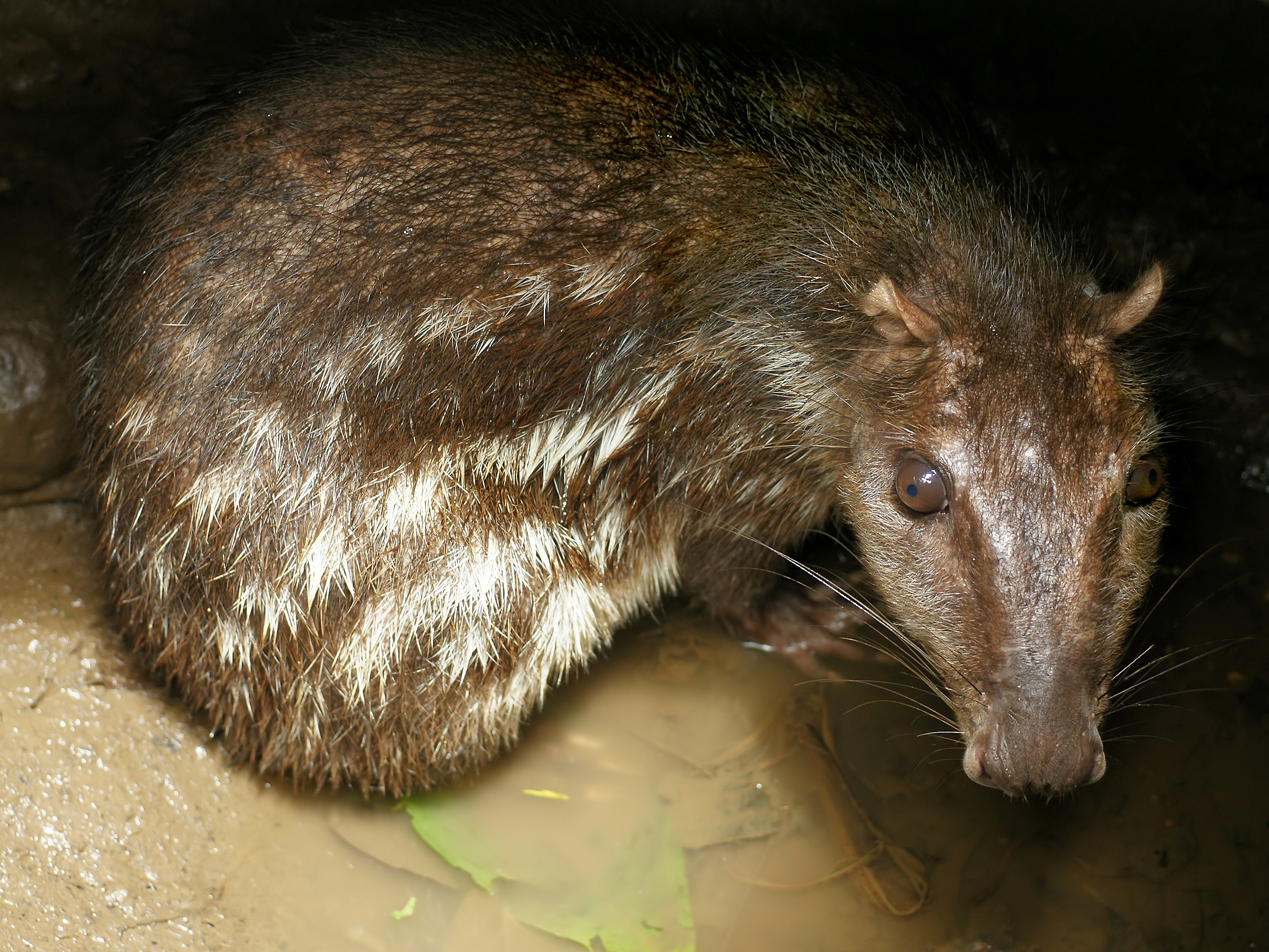
Lowland paca

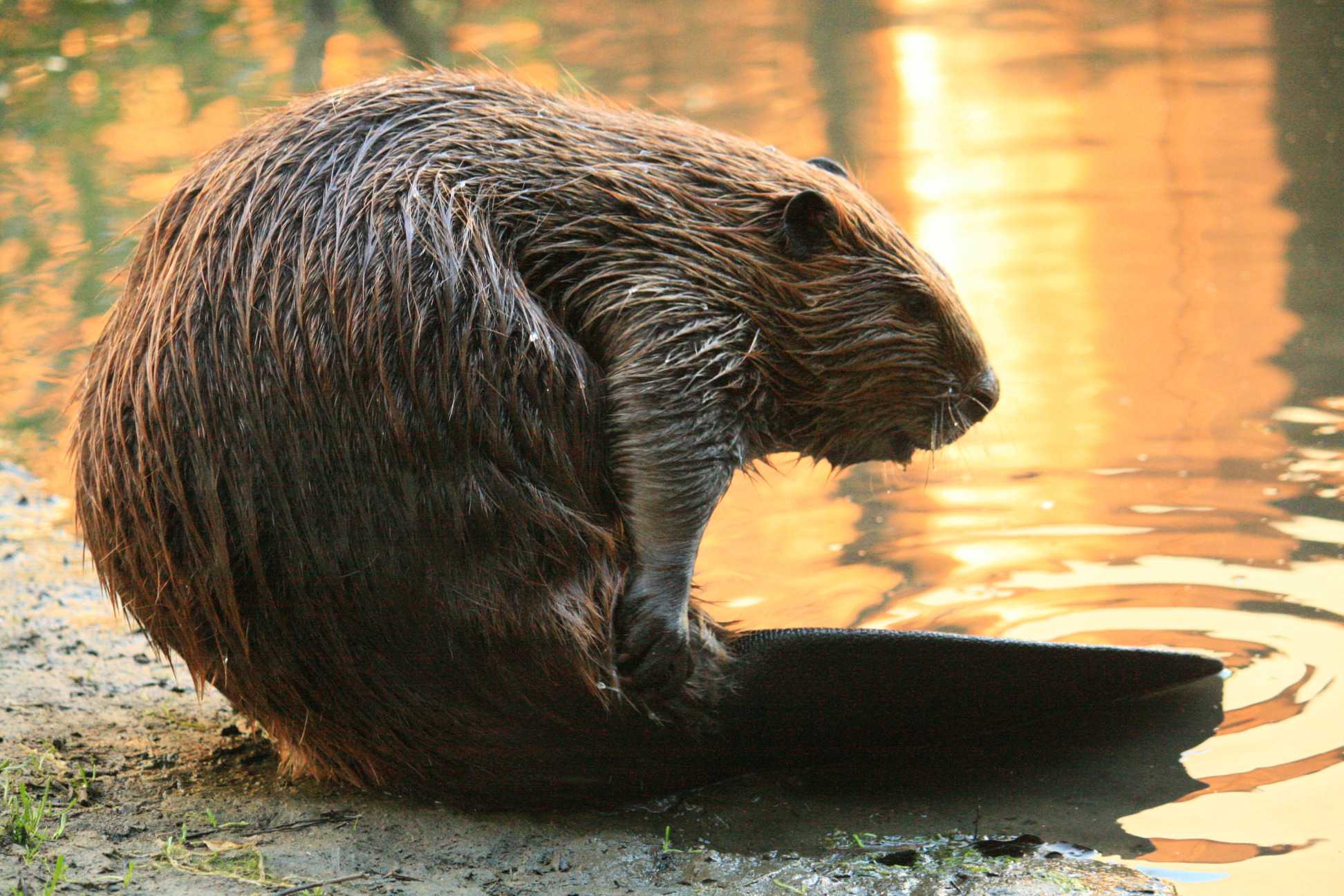
North American beaver

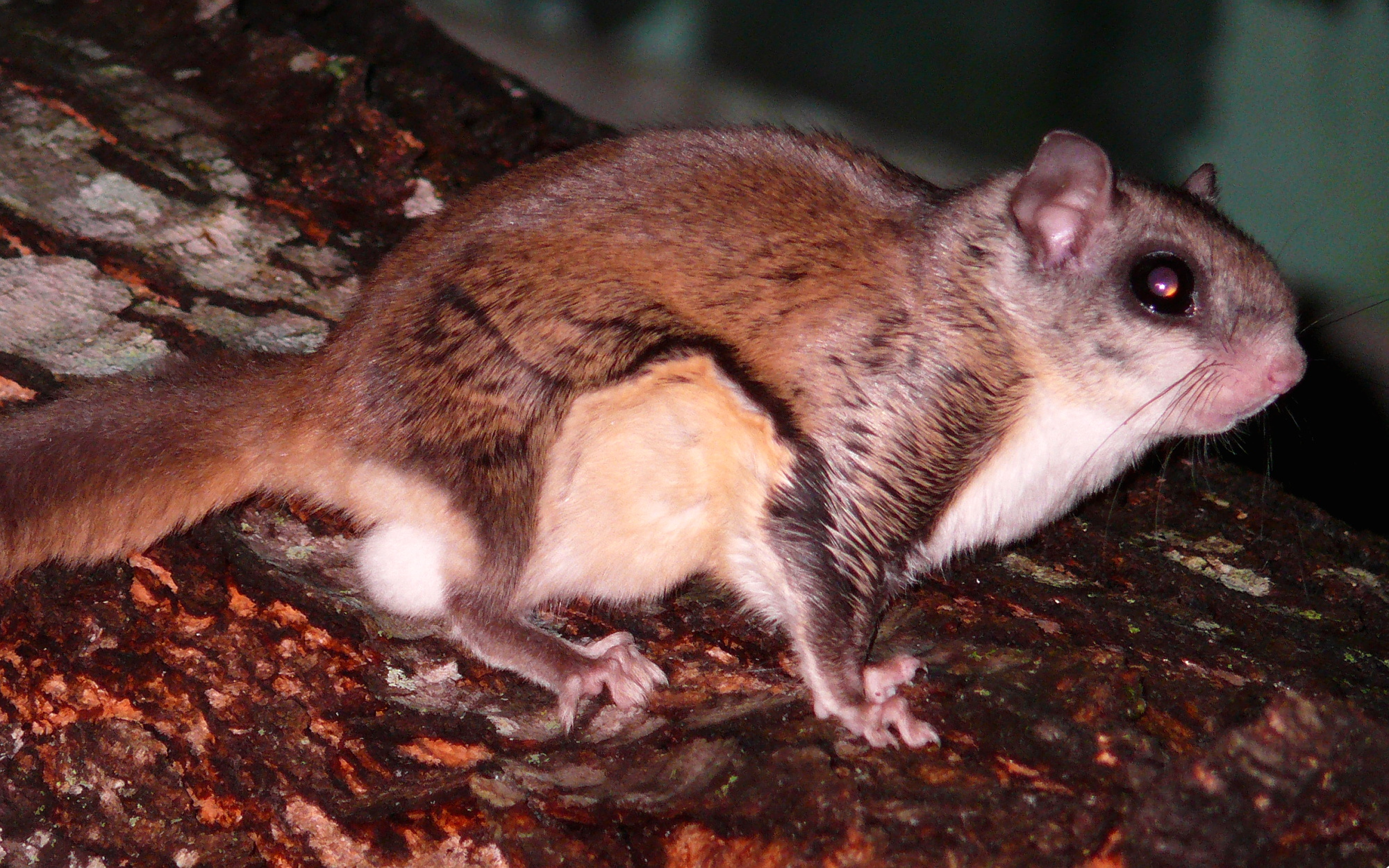
Southern flying squirrel

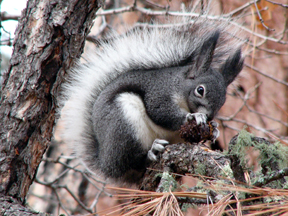
Abert's squirrel

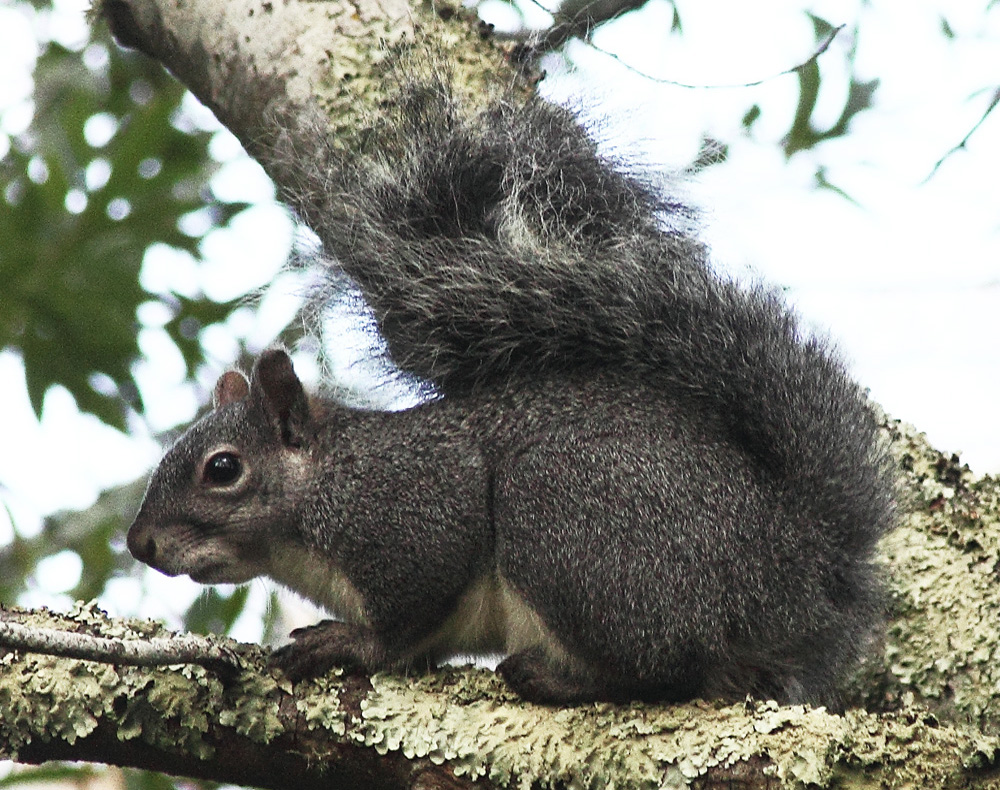
Western gray squirrel

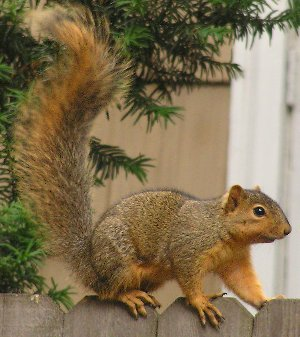
Fox squirrel

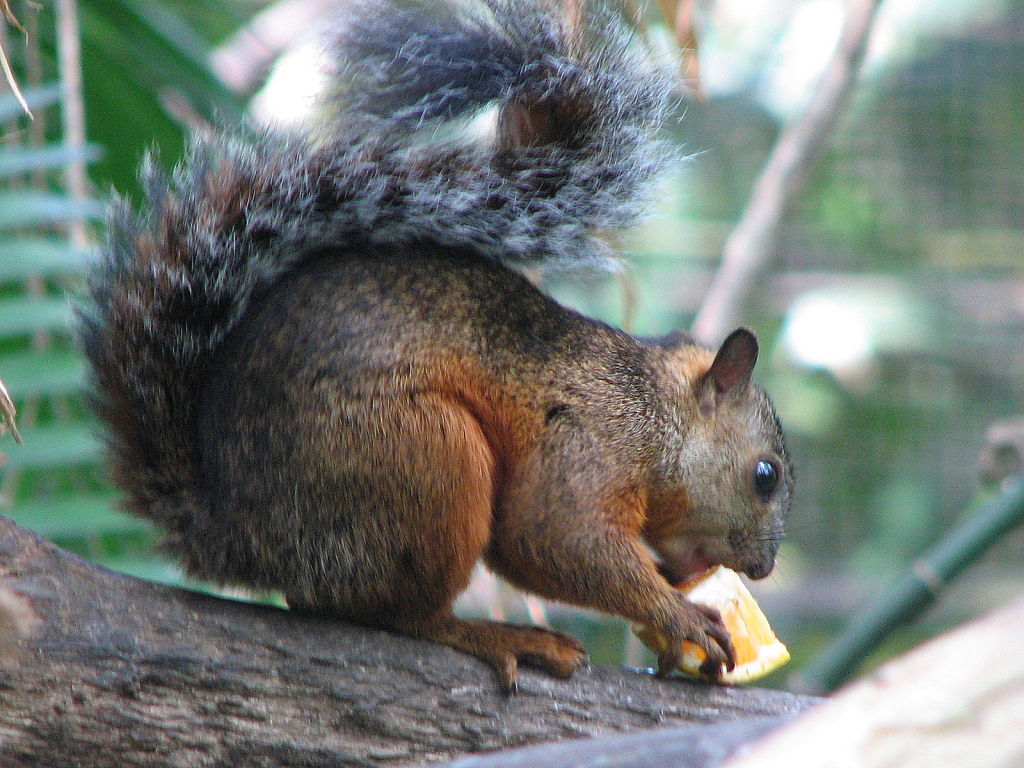
Variegated squirrel

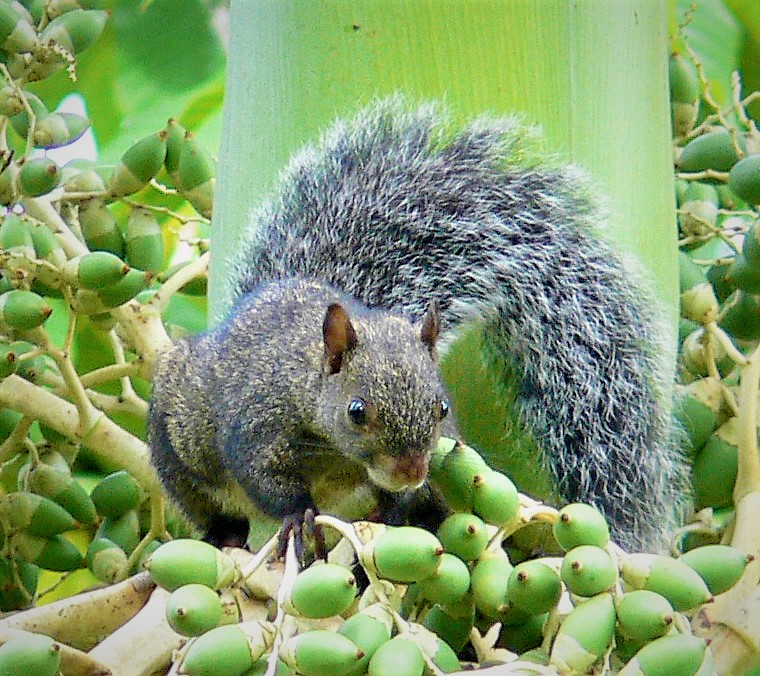
Yucatan squirrel

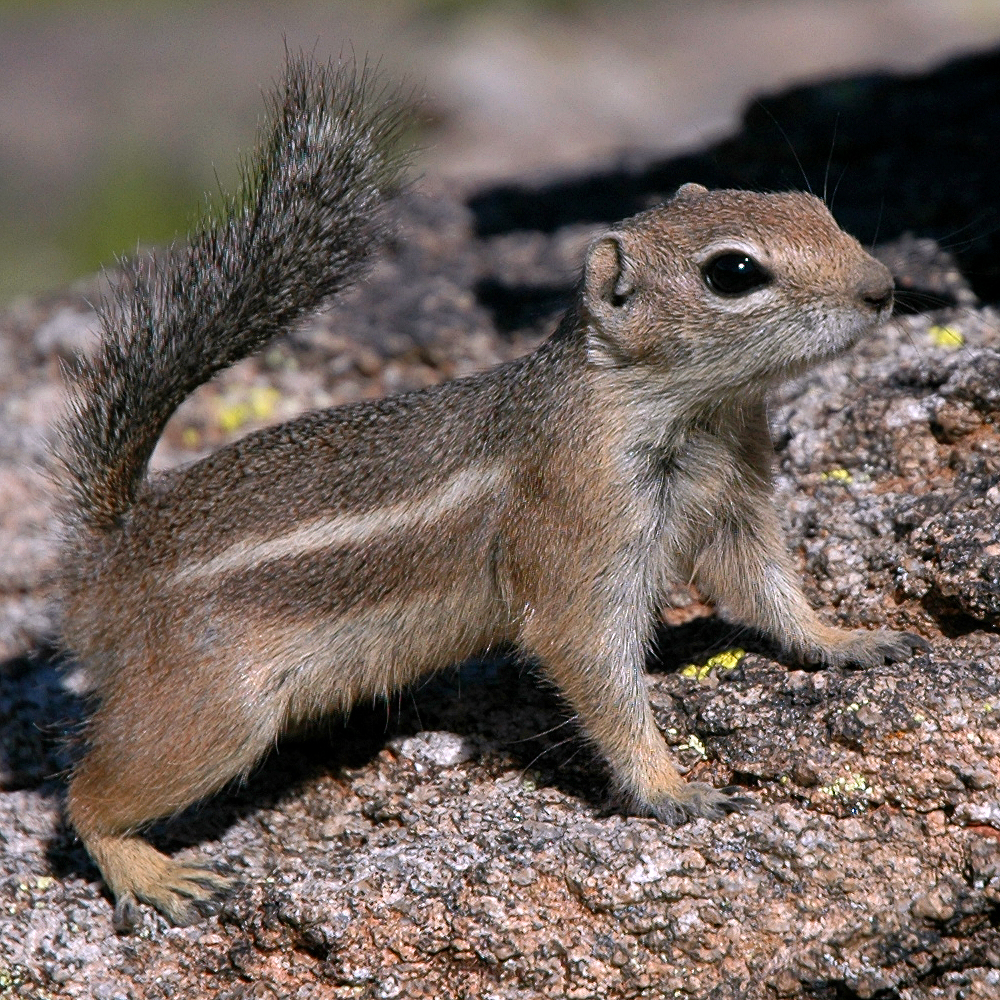
Harris's antelope squirrel

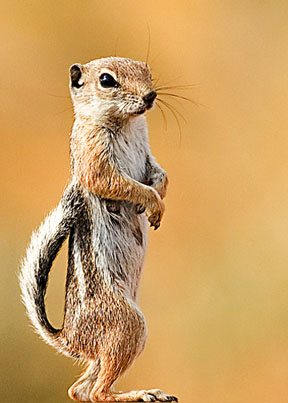
White-tailed antelope squirrel

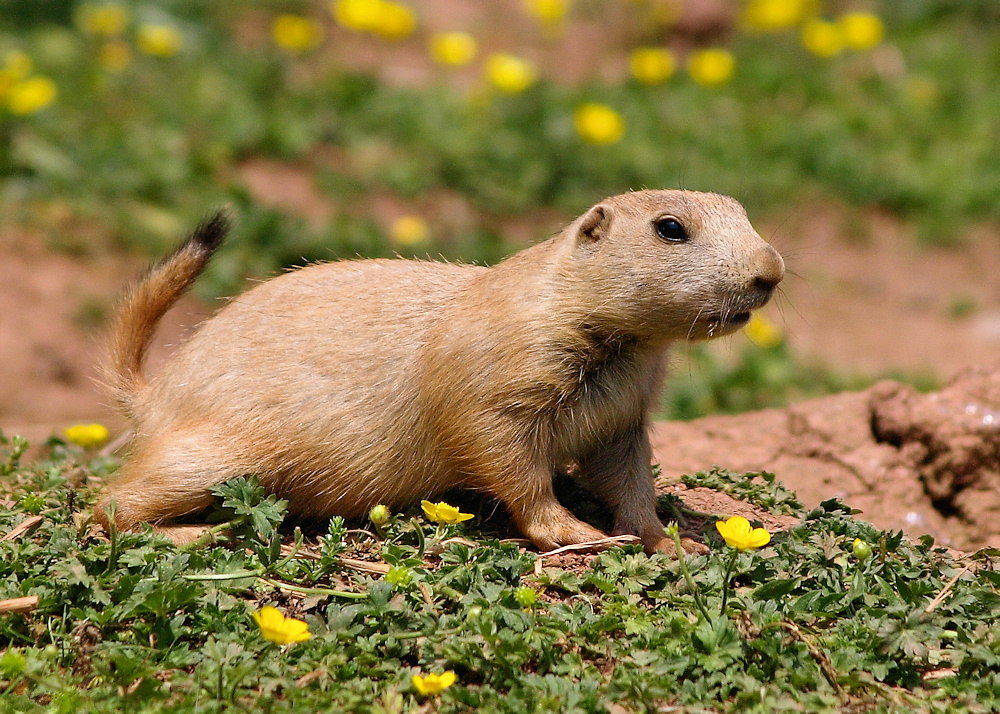
Black-tailed prairie dog

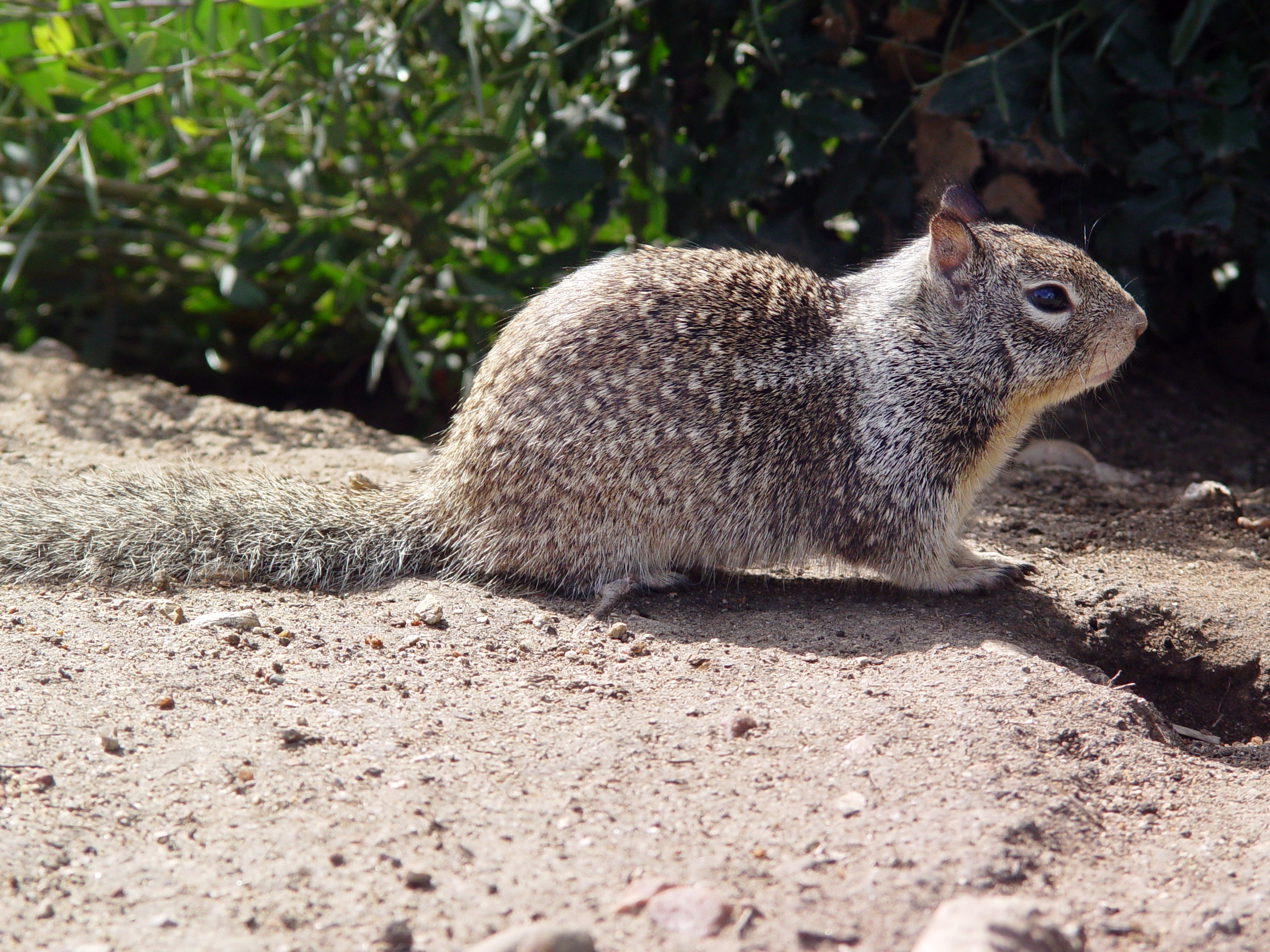
California ground squirrel

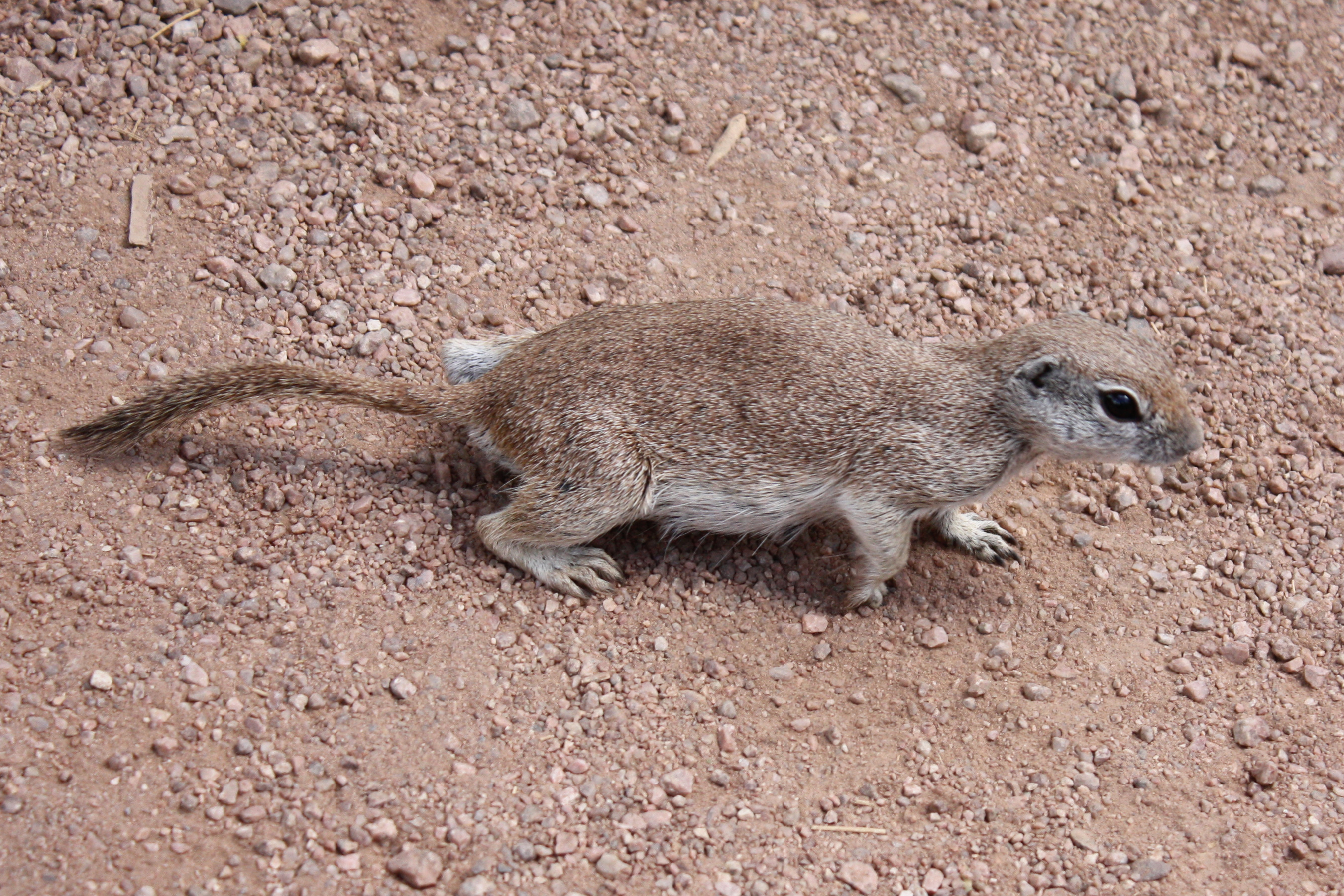
Round-tailed ground squirrel

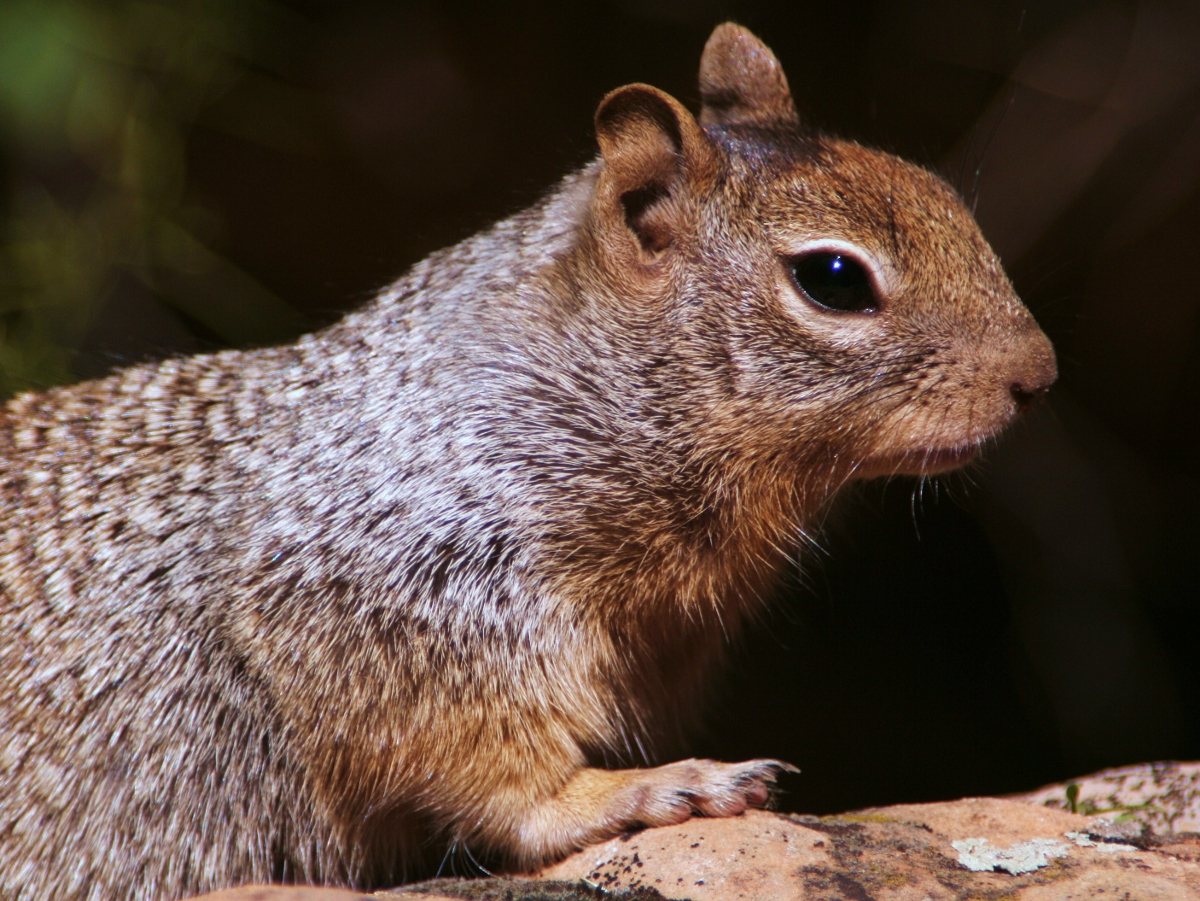
Rock squirrel

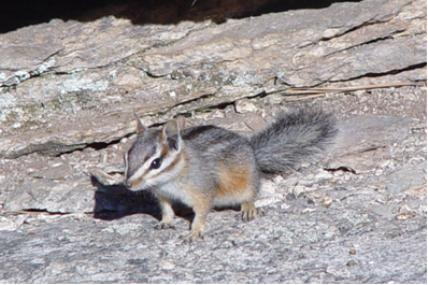
Cliff chipmunk

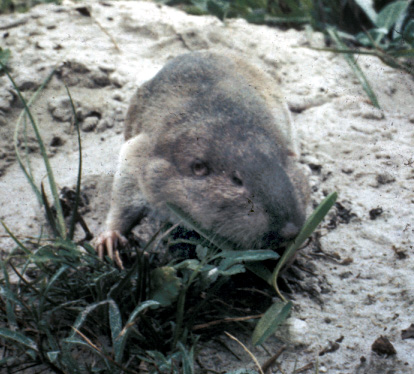
Texas pocket gopher

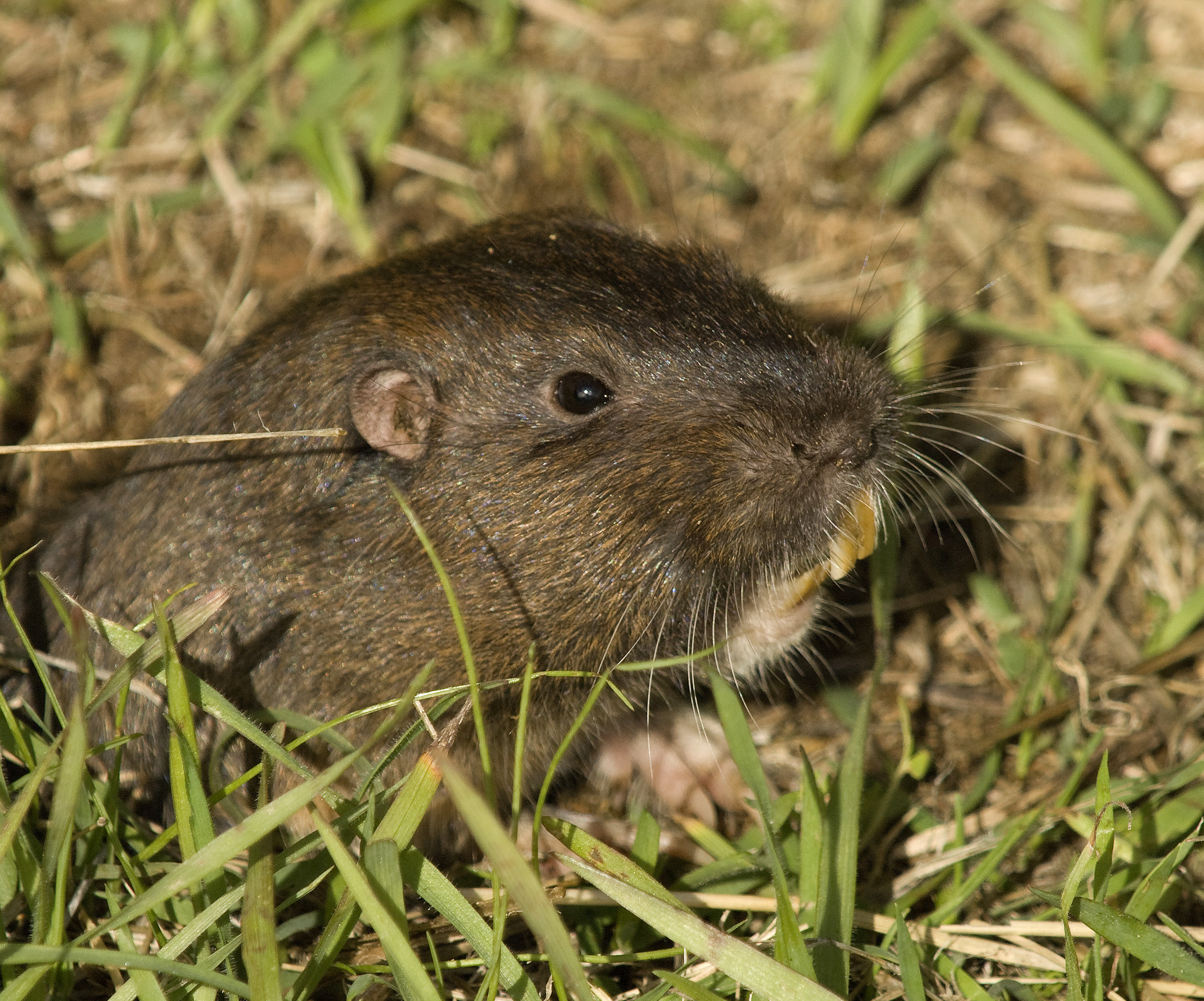
Botta's pocket gopher

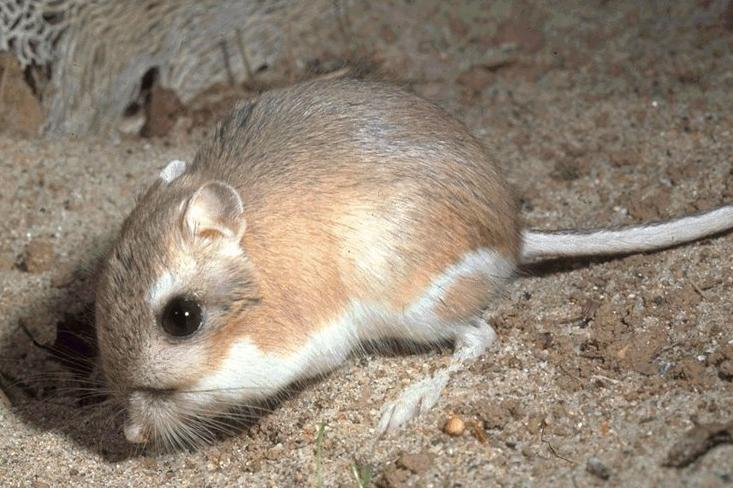
Ord's kangaroo rat

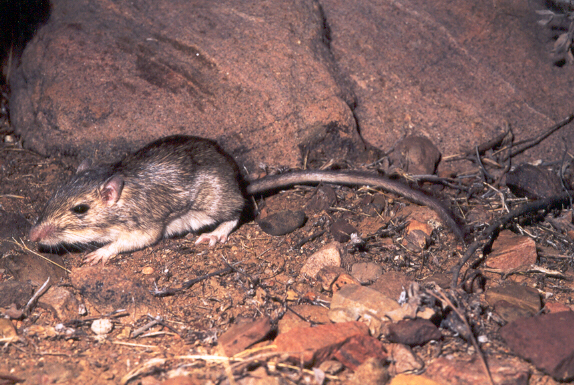
Bailey's pocket mouse

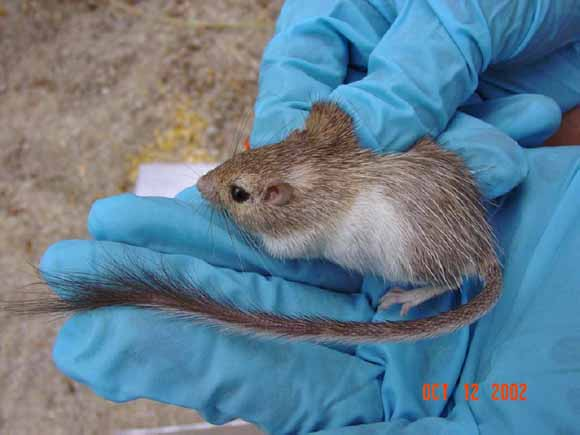
Spiny pocket mouse

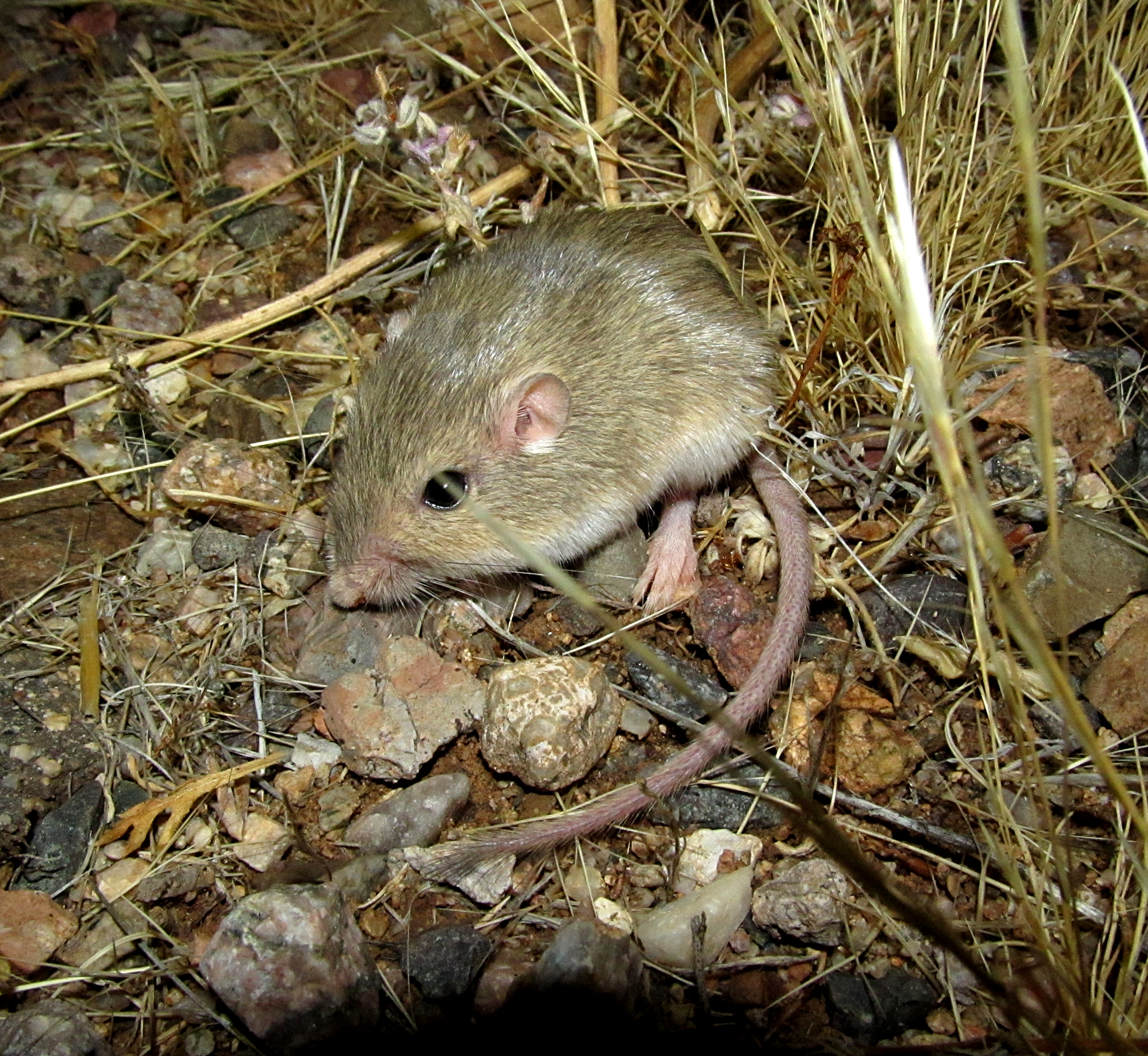
Silky pocket mouse

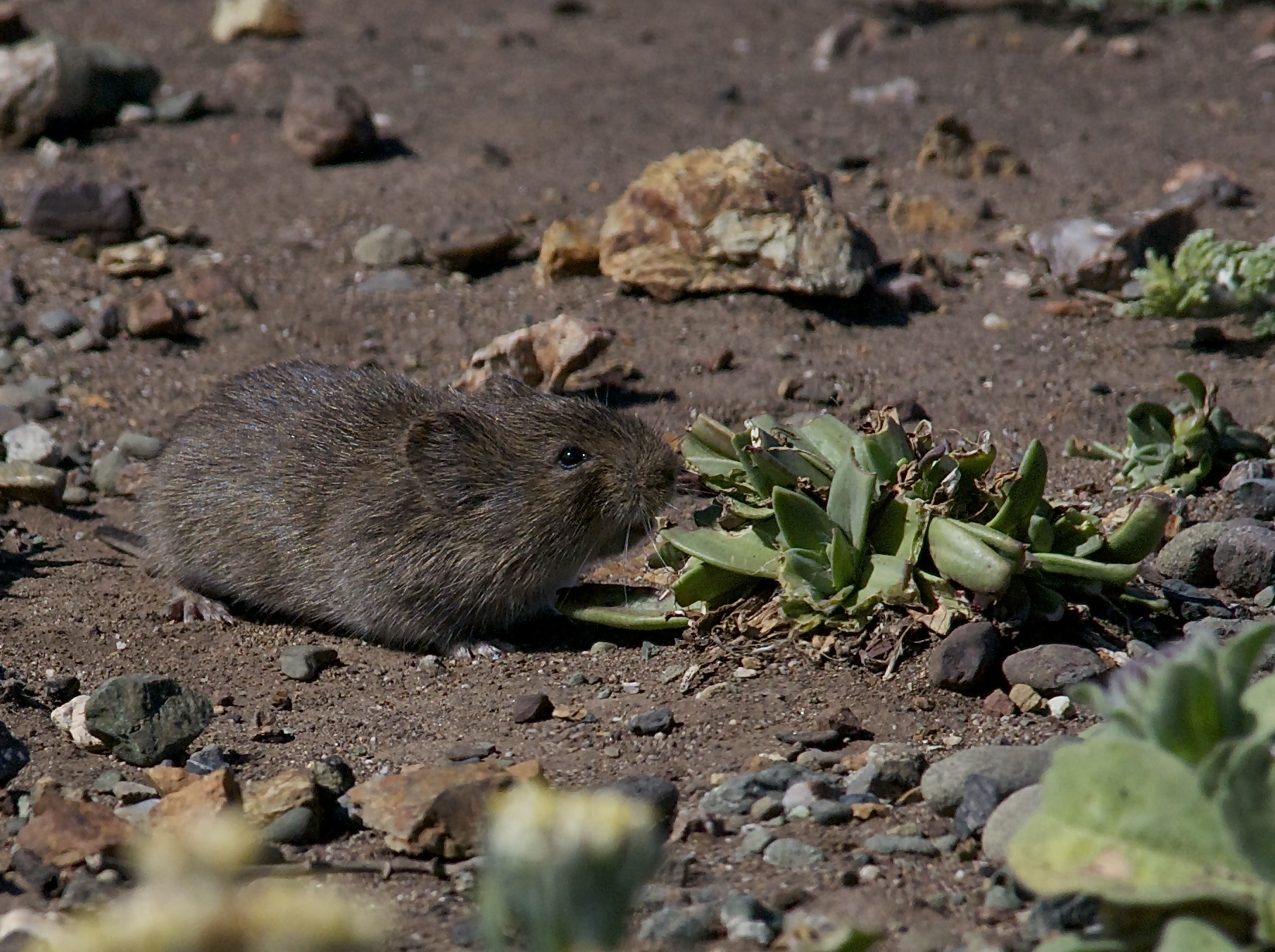
California vole

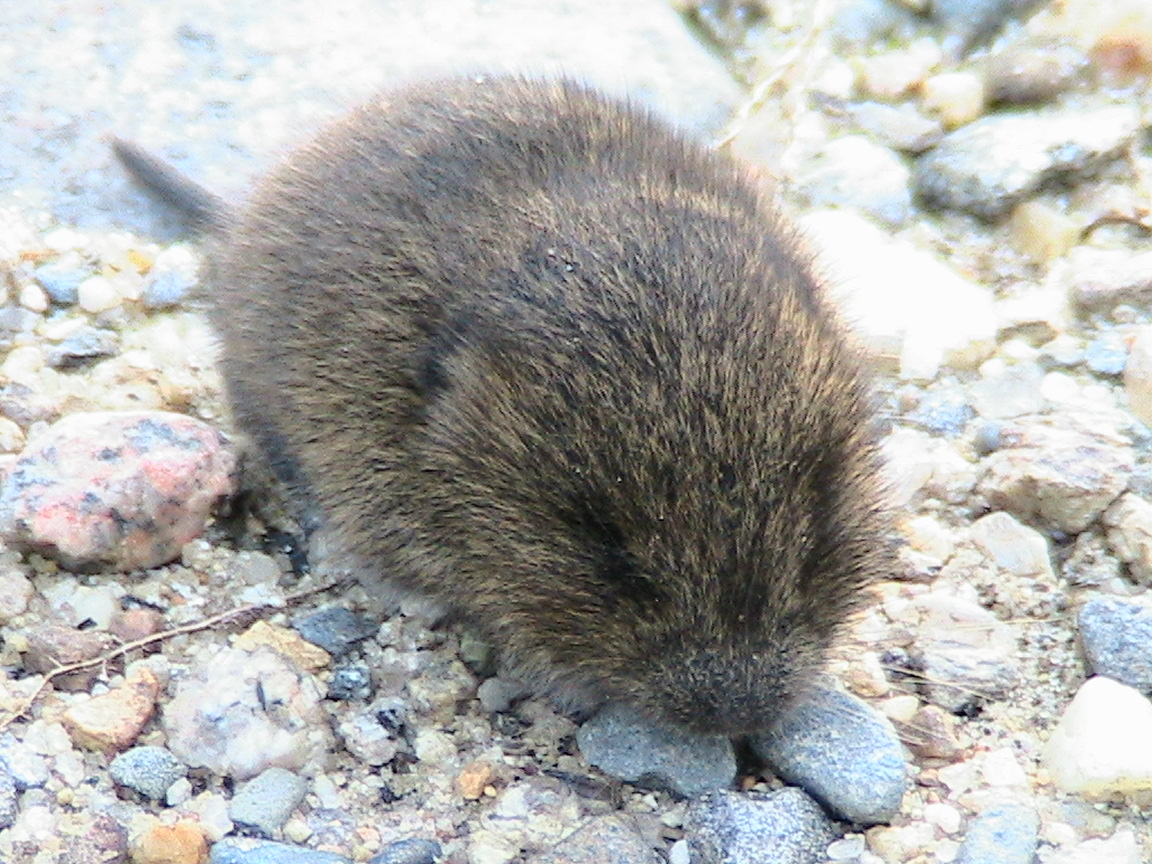
Meadow vole

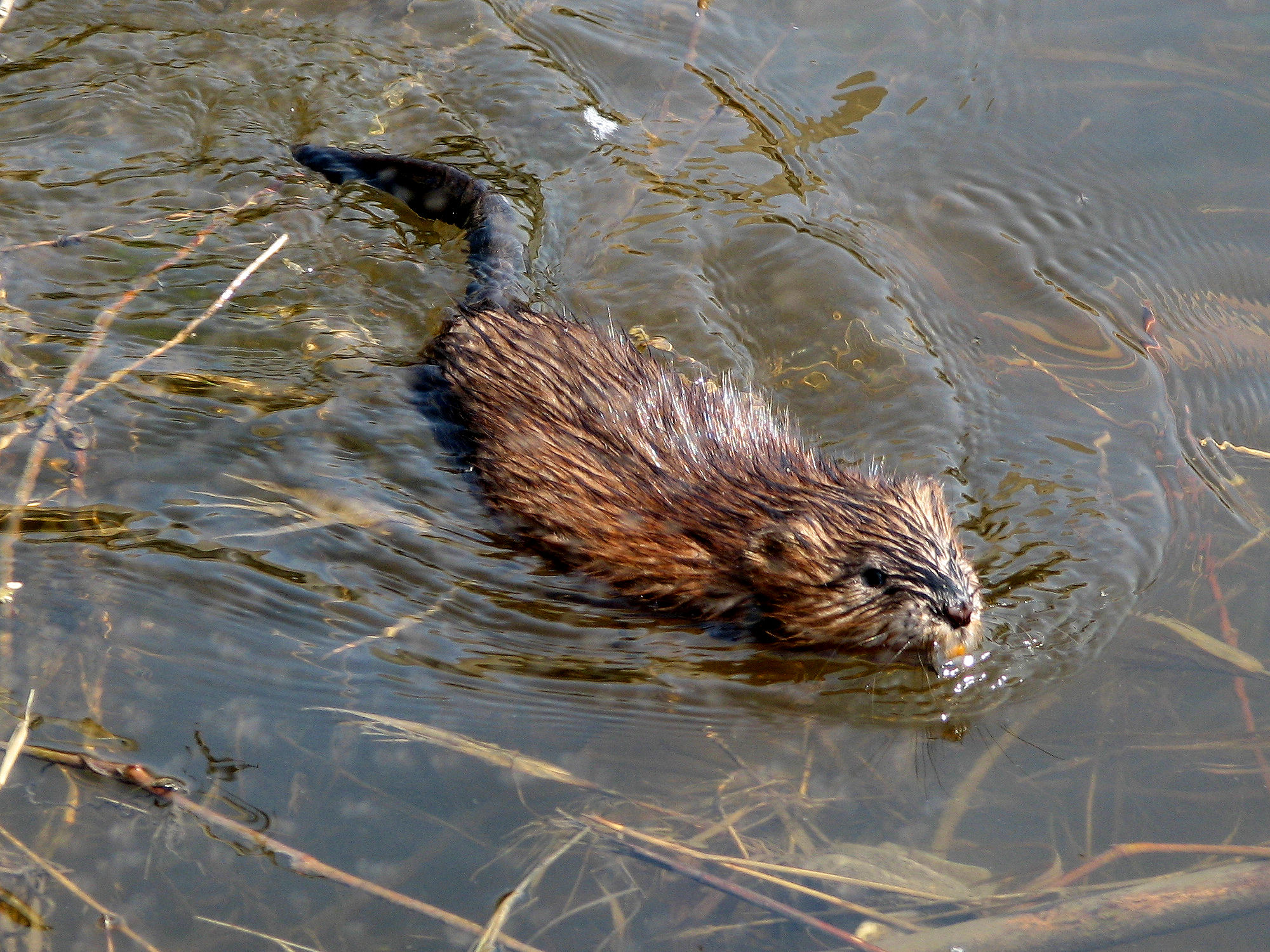
Muskrat

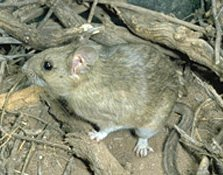
White-throated woodrat

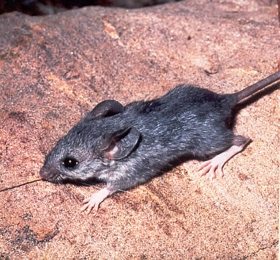
Cactus mouse

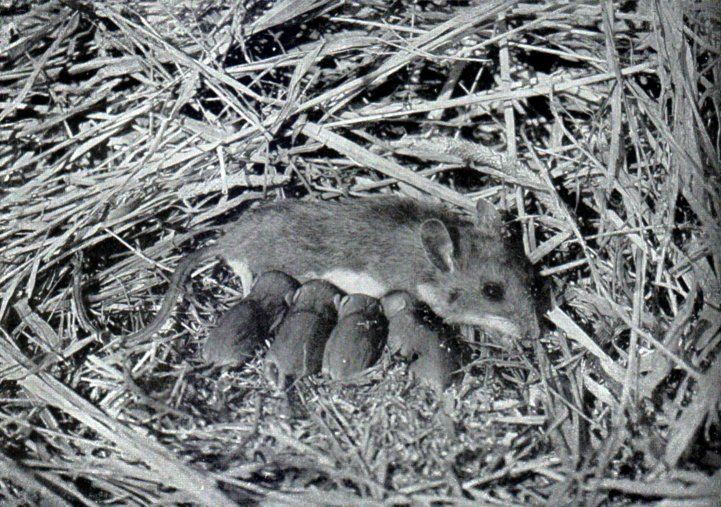
White-footed mice

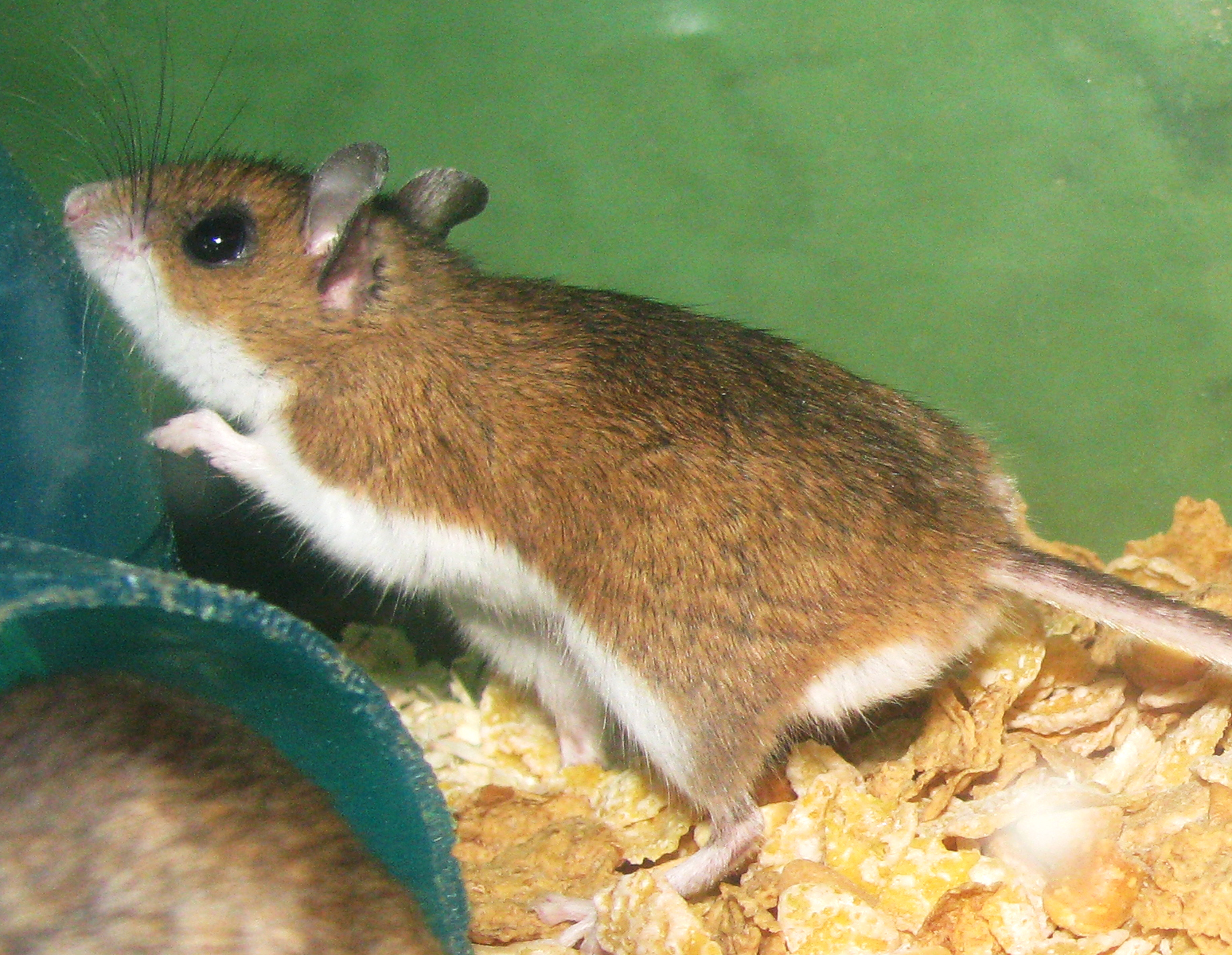
Deer mouse

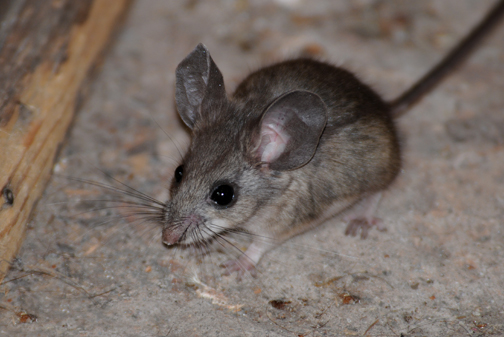
Pinyon mouse

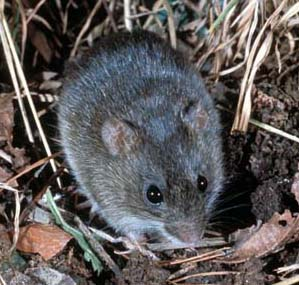
Marsh rice rat

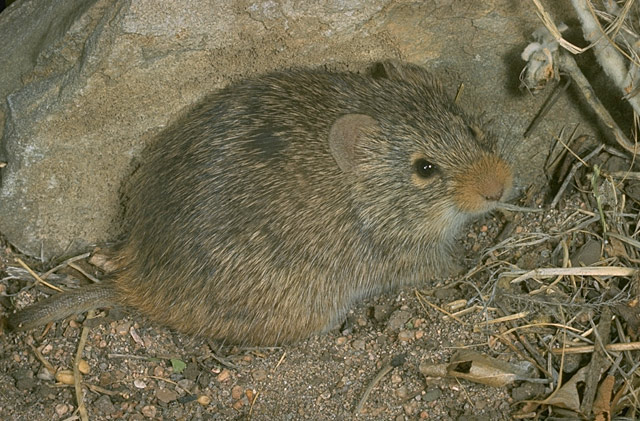
Yellow-nosed cotton rat

Rodents make up the largest order of mammals, with over 40% of mammalian species. They have two incisors in the upper and lower jaw which grow continually and must be kept short by gnawing. Most rodents are small, although the capybara can weigh up to 45 kg (99 lb). According to the IUCN listing, Mexico has more rodent species (236 as of April 2011) than any other country in the world (Brazil is second with 222). Of Mexico's rodents, 2% are caviomorphs, 14.5% are sciurids, 25.5% are castorimorphs and 58% are cricetids. This distribution is fairly similar to that of the remainder of North America (although sciurids are relatively twice as abundant to the north, at the expense of cricetids), but is very different from that of South America, where the corresponding figures are 36%, 3%, 1% and 60%. Of Mexico's cricetids, 17% are sigmodontine, while the figure for South America is 99.5%. (Note: This is based on the definition of Sigmodontinae that excludes Neotominae and Tylomyinae.) Mexico's caviomorphs are recent immigrants from South America, where their ancestors washed ashore after rafting across the Atlantic from Africa about 40–45 million years ago. Conversely, South America's sciurids, castorimorphs and cricetids are recent immigrants from Central America (with sigmodontines getting a head start on the others).

- Suborder: Hystricomorpha
  - Family: Erethizontidae (New World porcupines)
    - Subfamily: Erethizontinae
      - Genus: Erethizon
        - North American porcupine, E. dorsatum LC
      - Genus: Coendou
        - Mexican hairy dwarf porcupine, Coendou mexicanus LC
  - Family: Dasyproctidae (agoutis and pacas)
    - Genus: Dasyprocta
      - Mexican agouti, Dasyprocta mexicana CR
      - Central American agouti, Dasyprocta punctata LC
  - Family: Cuniculidae
    - Genus: Cuniculus
      - Lowland paca, Cuniculus paca LC
- Suborder: Sciuromorpha
  - Family: Sciuridae (squirrels)
    - Subfamily: Sciurinae
      - Tribe: Pteromyini
        - Genus: Glaucomys
          - Southern flying squirrel, Glaucomys volans LC
      - Tribe: Sciurini
        - Genus: Sciurus
          - Abert's squirrel, Sciurus aberti LC
          - Allen's squirrel, Sciurus alleni LC
          - Arizona gray squirrel, Sciurus arizonensis DD
          - Mexican gray squirrel, Sciurus aureogaster LC
          - Collie's squirrel, Sciurus colliaei LC
          - Deppe's squirrel, Sciurus deppei LC
          - Western gray squirrel, Sciurus griseus LC
          - Mexican fox squirrel, Sciurus nayaritensis LC
          - Fox squirrel, Sciurus niger LC
          - Peters's squirrel, Sciurus oculatus LC
          - Variegated squirrel, Sciurus variegatoides LC
          - Yucatan squirrel, Sciurus yucatanensis LC
        - Genus: Tamiasciurus
          - Douglas squirrel, Tamiasciurus douglasii LC
            - Mearns's squirrel, T. d. mearnsi EN
    - Subfamily: Xerinae
      - Tribe: Marmotini
        - Genus: Ammospermophilus
          - Harris's antelope squirrel, Ammospermophilus harrisii LC
          - Espíritu Santo antelope squirrel, Ammospermophilus insularis NE
          - Texas antelope squirrel, Ammospermophilus interpres LC
          - White-tailed antelope squirrel, Ammospermophilus leucurus LC
        - Genus: Cynomys
          - Black-tailed prairie dog, Cynomys ludovicianus LC
          - Mexican prairie dog, Cynomys mexicanus EN
        - Genus: Neotamias
          - Buller's chipmunk, Neotamias bulleri VU
          - Cliff chipmunk, Neotamias dorsalis LC
          - Durango chipmunk, Neotamias durangae LC
          - Merriam's chipmunk, Neotamias merriami LC
          - California chipmunk, Neotamias obscurus LC
        - Genus: Spermophilus
          - Tropical ground squirrel, Spermophilus adocetus LC
          - Ring-tailed ground squirrel, Spermophilus annulatus LC
          - Baja California rock squirrel, Spermophilus atricapillus EN
          - California ground squirrel, Spermophilus beecheyi LC
          - Sierra Madre ground squirrel, Spermophilus madrensis NT
          - Mexican ground squirrel, Spermophilus mexicanus LC
          - Perote ground squirrel, Xerospermophilus perotensis EN
          - Spotted ground squirrel, Spermophilus spilosoma LC
          - Round-tailed ground squirrel, Spermophilus tereticaudus LC
          - Rock squirrel, Spermophilus variegatus LC
- Suborder: Castorimorpha
  - Family: Castoridae (beavers)
    - Genus: Castor
      - American beaver, Castor canadensis LC
  - Family: Geomyidae
    - Genus: Cratogeomys
      - Yellow-faced pocket gopher, Cratogeomys castanops LC
      - Oriental Basin pocket gopher, Cratogeomys fulvescens LC
      - Smoky pocket gopher, Cratogeomys fumosus LC
      - Goldman's pocket gopher, Cratogeomys goldmani LC
      - Merriam's pocket gopher, Cratogeomys merriami LC
      - Perote pocket gopher, Cratogeomys perotensis LC
      - Flat-headed pocket gopher, Cratogeomys planiceps LC
    - Genus: Geomys
      - Desert pocket gopher, Geomys arenarius NT
      - Texas pocket gopher, Geomys personatus LC
      - Tropical pocket gopher, Geomys tropicalis CR
    - Genus: Orthogeomys
      - Oaxacan pocket gopher, Orthogeomys cuniculus DD
      - Giant pocket gopher, Orthogeomys grandis LC
      - Hispid pocket gopher, Orthogeomys hispidus LC
      - Big pocket gopher, Orthogeomys lanius CR
    - Genus: Pappogeomys
      - Alcorn's pocket gopher, Pappogeomys alcorni CR
      - Buller's pocket gopher, Pappogeomys bulleri LC
    - Genus: Thomomys
      - Botta's pocket gopher, Thomomys bottae LC
      - Southern pocket gopher, Thomomys umbrinus LC
    - Genus: Zygogeomys
      - Michoacan pocket gopher, Zygogeomys trichopus EN
  - Family: Heteromyidae
    - Subfamily: Dipodomyinae
      - Genus: Dipodomys
        - Agile kangaroo rat, Dipodomys agilis LC
        - Gulf Coast kangaroo rat, Dipodomys compactus LC
        - Desert kangaroo rat, Dipodomys deserti LC
        - San Quintin kangaroo rat, Dipodomys gravipes CR
        - San Jose Island kangaroo rat, Dipodomys insularis CR
        - Margarita Island kangaroo rat, Dipodomys margaritae CR
        - Merriam's kangaroo rat, Dipodomys merriami LC
        - Nelson's kangaroo rat, Dipodomys nelsoni LC
        - Ord's kangaroo rat, Dipodomys ordii LC
        - Phillips's kangaroo rat, Dipodomys phillipsii LC
        - Dulzura kangaroo rat, Dipodomys simulans LC
        - Banner-tailed kangaroo rat, Dipodomys spectabilis NT
    - Subfamily: Heteromyinae
      - Genus: Heteromys
        - Desmarest's spiny pocket mouse, Heteromys desmarestianus LC
        - Gaumer's spiny pocket mouse, Heteromys gaumeri LC
        - Mexican spiny pocket mouse, Heteromys irroratus LC
        - Nelson's spiny pocket mouse, Heteromys nelsoni EN
        - Painted spiny pocket mouse, Heteromys pictus LC
        - Salvin's spiny pocket mouse, Heteromys salvini LC
        - Jaliscan spiny pocket mouse, Heteromys spectabilis EN
    - Subfamily: Perognathinae
      - Genus: Chaetodipus
        - Little desert pocket mouse, Chaetodipus arenarius LC
        - Narrow-skulled pocket mouse, Chaetodipus artus LC
        - Bailey's pocket mouse, Chaetodipus baileyi LC
        - California pocket mouse, Chaetodipus californicus LC
        - Dalquest's pocket mouse, Chaetodipus dalquesti VU
        - Chihuahuan pocket mouse, Chaetodipus eremicus LC
        - San Diego pocket mouse, Chaetodipus fallax LC
        - Long-tailed pocket mouse, Chaetodipus formosus LC
        - Goldman's pocket mouse, Chaetodipus goldmani NT
        - Hispid pocket mouse, Chaetodipus hispidus LC
        - Rock pocket mouse, Chaetodipus intermedius LC
        - Lined pocket mouse, Chaetodipus lineatus DD
        - Nelson's pocket mouse, Chaetodipus nelsoni LC
        - Desert pocket mouse, Chaetodipus penicillatus LC
        - Sinaloan pocket mouse, Chaetodipus pernix LC
        - Baja pocket mouse, Chaetodipus rudinoris LC
        - Spiny pocket mouse, Chaetodipus spinatus LC
      - Genus: Perognathus
        - Arizona pocket mouse, Perognathus amplus LC
        - Plains pocket mouse, Perognathus flavescens LC
        - Silky pocket mouse, Perognathus flavus LC
        - Little pocket mouse, Perognathus longimembris LC
        - Merriam's pocket mouse, Perognathus merriami LC
- Suborder: Myomorpha
  - Family: Cricetidae
    - Subfamily: Arvicolinae
      - Genus: Microtus
        - California vole, Microtus californicus LC
        - Guatemalan vole, Microtus guatemalensis NT
        - Mexican vole, Microtus mexicanus LC
        - Tarabundí vole, Microtus oaxacensis EN
        - Western meadow vole, Microtus drummondii NE extirpated
        - Jalapan pine vole, Microtus quasiater NT
        - Zempoaltépec vole, Microtus umbrosus EN
      - Genus: Ondatra
        - Muskrat, Ondatra zibethicus LC
    - Subfamily: Tylomyinae
      - Genus: Nyctomys
        - Sumichrast's vesper rat, Nyctomys sumichrasti LC
      - Genus: Otonyctomys
        - Hatt's vesper rat, Otonyctomys hatti LC
      - Genus: Ototylomys
        - Big-eared climbing rat, Ototylomys phyllotis LC
      - Genus: Tylomys
        - Chiapan climbing rat, Tylomys bullaris CR
        - Peters's climbing rat, Tylomys nudicaudus LC
        - Tumbala climbing rat, Tylomys tumbalensis CR
    - Subfamily: Neotominae
      - Genus: Baiomys
        - Southern pygmy mouse, Baiomys musculus LC
        - Northern pygmy mouse, Baiomys taylori LC
      - Genus: Habromys
        - Chinanteco deer mouse, Habromys chinanteco CR
        - Delicate deer mouse, Habromys delicatulus CR
        - Ixtlán deer mouse, Habromys ixtlani CR
        - Zempoaltepec deer mouse, Habromys lepturus CR
        - Crested-tailed deer mouse, Habromys lophurus NT
        - Habromys schmidlyi CR
        - Jico deer mouse, Habromys simulatus EN
      - Genus: Hodomys
        - Allen's wood rat, Hodomys alleni LC
      - Genus: Megadontomys
        - Oaxaca giant deer mouse, Megadontomys cryophilus EN
        - Nelson's giant deer mouse, Megadontomys nelsoni EN
        - Thomas's giant deer mouse, Megadontomys thomasi EN
      - Genus: Nelsonia
        - Goldman's diminutive woodrat, Nelsonia goldmani EN
        - Diminutive woodrat, Nelsonia neotomodon NT
      - Genus: Neotoma
        - White-throated woodrat, Neotoma albigula LC
          - Turner Island woodrat, N. b. varia
        - Tamaulipan woodrat, Neotoma angustapalata EN
        - Bryant's woodrat, Neotoma bryanti EN
          - Anthony's woodrat, N. b. anthonyi EX
          - Bunker's woodrat, N. b. bunkeri EX
          - San Martin Island woodrat, N. b. martinensis EX
        - Arizona woodrat, Neotoma devia LC
        - Dusky-footed woodrat, Neotoma fuscipes LC
        - Goldman's woodrat, Neotoma goldmani LC
        - Desert woodrat, Neotoma lepida LC
        - White-toothed woodrat, Neotoma leucodon LC
        - Angel de la Guarda woodrat, Neotoma insularis DD
        - Big-eared woodrat, Neotoma macrotis LC
        - Mexican woodrat, Neotoma mexicana LC
        - Southern plains woodrat, Neotoma micropus LC
        - Nelson's woodrat, Neotoma nelsoni CR
        - Bolaños woodrat, Neotoma palatina VU
        - Sonoran woodrat, Neotoma phenax NT
      - Genus: Neotomodon
        - Mexican volcano mouse, Neotomodon alstoni LC
      - Genus: Osgoodomys
        - Michoacan deer mouse, Osgoodomys banderanus LC
      - Genus: Peromyscus
        - Aztec mouse, Peromyscus aztecus LC
        - Orizaba deer mouse, Peromyscus beatae LC
        - Brush mouse, Peromyscus boylii LC
        - Perote mouse, Peromyscus bullatus CR
        - California mouse, Peromyscus californicus LC
        - Burt's deer mouse, Peromyscus caniceps CR
        - Canyon mouse, Peromyscus crinitus LC
        - Dickey's deer mouse, Peromyscus dickeyi CR
        - Zacatecan deer mouse, Peromyscus difficilis LC
        - Cactus mouse, Peromyscus eremicus LC
        - Eva's desert mouse, Peromyscus eva LC
        - Northern Baja deer mouse, Peromyscus fraterculus LC
        - Blackish deer mouse, Peromyscus furvus DD
        - Osgood's mouse, Peromyscus gratus LC
        - Angel Island mouse, Peromyscus guardia CR
        - Guatemalan deer mouse, Peromyscus guatemalensis LC
        - Naked-eared deer mouse, Peromyscus gymnotis LC
        - Hooper's mouse, Peromyscus hooperi LC
        - Transvolcanic deer mouse, Peromyscus hylocetes LC
        - San Lorenzo mouse, Peromyscus interparietalis CR
        - White-footed mouse, Peromyscus leucopus LC
        - Nimble-footed mouse, Peromyscus levipes LC
        - Tres Marias Island mouse, Peromyscus madrensis EN
        - Deer mouse, Peromyscus maniculatus LC
        - Brown deer mouse, Peromyscus megalops LC
        - Puebla deer mouse, Peromyscus mekisturus CR
        - Zempoaltepec, Peromyscus melanocarpus EN
        - Plateau mouse, Peromyscus melanophrys LC
        - Black-eared mouse, Peromyscus melanotis LC
        - Black-tailed mouse, Peromyscus melanurus EN
        - Mesquite mouse, Peromyscus merriami LC
        - Mexican deer mouse, Peromyscus mexicanus LC
        - Northern rock mouse, Peromyscus nasutus LC
        - El Carrizo deer mouse, Peromyscus ochraventer EN
        - White-ankled mouse, Peromyscus pectoralis LC
        - Pemberton's deer mouse, Peromyscus pembertoni EX
        - Tawny deer mouse, Peromyscus perfulvus LC
        - Chihuahuan mouse, Peromyscus polius NT
        - False canyon mouse, Peromyscus pseudocrinitus CR
        - La Palma field mouse, Peromyscus sagax DD
        - Schmidly's deer mouse, Peromyscus schmidlyi LC
        - Santa Cruz mouse, Peromyscus sejugis EN
        - Nayarit mouse, Peromyscus simulus VU
        - Slevin's mouse, Peromyscus slevini CR
        - Gleaning mouse, Peromyscus spicilegus LC
        - San Esteban Island mouse, Peromyscus stephani CR
        - Pinyon mouse, Peromyscus truei LC
        - Winkelmann's mouse, Peromyscus winkelmanni EN
        - Yucatan deer mouse, Peromyscus yucatanicus LC
        - Chiapan deer mouse, Peromyscus zarhynchus VU
      - Genus: Reithrodontomys
        - Baker's small-toothed harvest mouse, Reithrodontomys bakeri EN
        - Sonoran harvest mouse, Reithrodontomys burti DD
        - Volcano harvest mouse, Reithrodontomys chrysopsis LC
        - Fulvous harvest mouse, Reithrodontomys fulvescens LC
        - Slender harvest mouse, Reithrodontomys gracilis LC
        - Hairy harvest mouse, Reithrodontomys hirsutus VU
        - Western harvest mouse, Reithrodontomys megalotis LC
        - Mexican harvest mouse, Reithrodontomys mexicanus LC
        - Small-toothed harvest mouse, Reithrodontomys microdon LC
        - Plains harvest mouse, Reithrodontomys montanus LC
        - Cozumel harvest mouse, Reithrodontomys spectabilis CR
        - Sumichrast's harvest mouse, Reithrodontomys sumichrasti LC
        - Narrow-nosed harvest mouse, Reithrodontomys tenuirostris VU
        - Zacatecas harvest mouse, Reithrodontomys zacatecae LC
      - Genus: Scotinomys
        - Alston's brown mouse, Scotinomys teguina LC
      - Genus: Xenomys
        - Magdalena rat, Xenomys nelsoni EN
    - Subfamily: Sigmodontinae
      - Genus: Handleyomys
        - Alfaro's rice rat, Handleyomys alfaroi LC
        - Chapman's rice rat, Handleyomys chapmani LC
        - Black-eared rice rat, Handleyomys melanotis LC
        - Striped rice rat, Handleyomys rhabdops VU
        - Long-nosed rice rat, Handleyomys rostratus LC
        - Cloud forest rice rat, Handleyomys saturatior NT
      - Genus: Oligoryzomys
        - Fulvous pygmy rice rat, Oligoryzomys fulvescens LC
      - Genus: Onychomys
        - Chihuahuan grasshopper mouse, Onychomys arenicola LC
        - Northern grasshopper mouse, Onychomys leucogaster LC
        - Southern grasshopper mouse, Onychomys torridus LC
      - Genus: Oryzomys
        - White-bellied rice rat, Oryzomys albiventer
        - Coues' rice rat, Oryzomys couesi LC
        - Nelson's rice rat, Oryzomys nelsoni EX
        - Marsh rice rat, Oryzomys palustris LC
        - Lower California rice rat, Oryzomys peninsulae
      - Genus: Rheomys
        - Mexican water mouse, Rheomys mexicanus EN
        - Thomas's water mouse, Rheomys thomasi NT
      - Genus: Sigmodon
        - Allen's cotton rat, Sigmodon alleni VU
        - Arizona cotton rat, Sigmodon arizonae LC
        - Tawny-bellied cotton rat, Sigmodon fulviventer LC
        - Southern cotton rat, Sigmodon hirsutus LC
        - Hispid cotton rat, Sigmodon hispidus LC presence uncertain
        - White-eared cotton rat, Sigmodon leucotis LC
        - Jaliscan cotton rat, Sigmodon mascotensis LC
        - Yellow-nosed cotton rat, Sigmodon ochrognathus LC
        - Miahuatlán cotton rat, Sigmodon planifrons EN
        - Toltec cotton rat, Sigmodon toltecus LC

==== Order: Lagomorpha (lagomorphs) ====
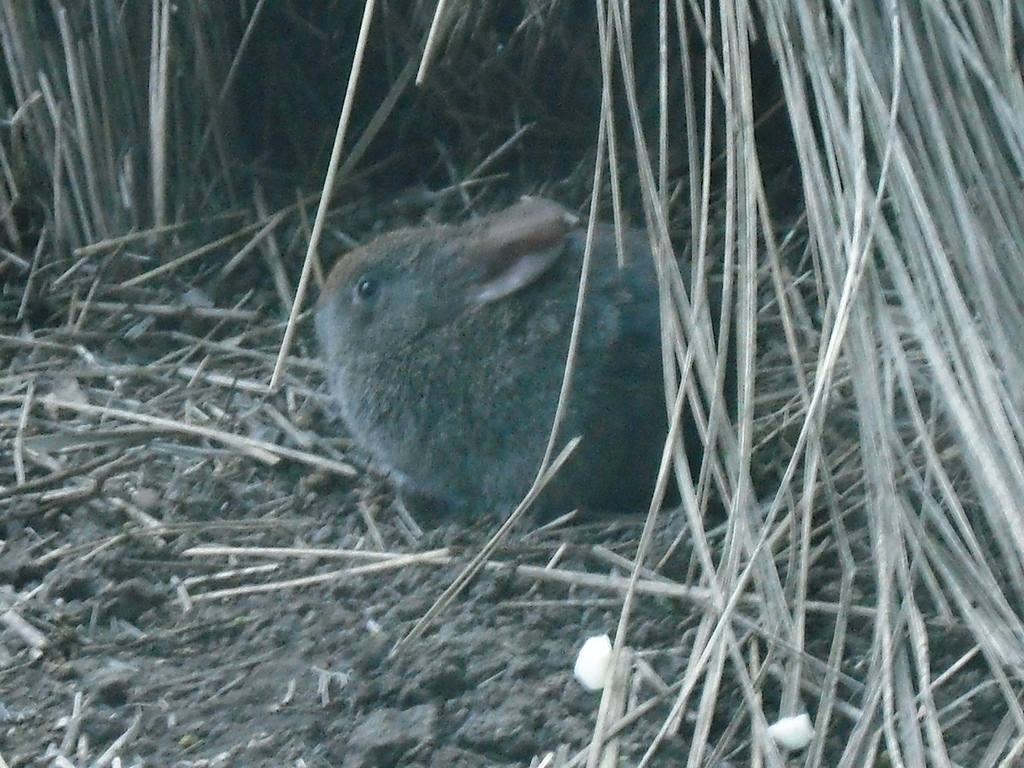
Volcano rabbit

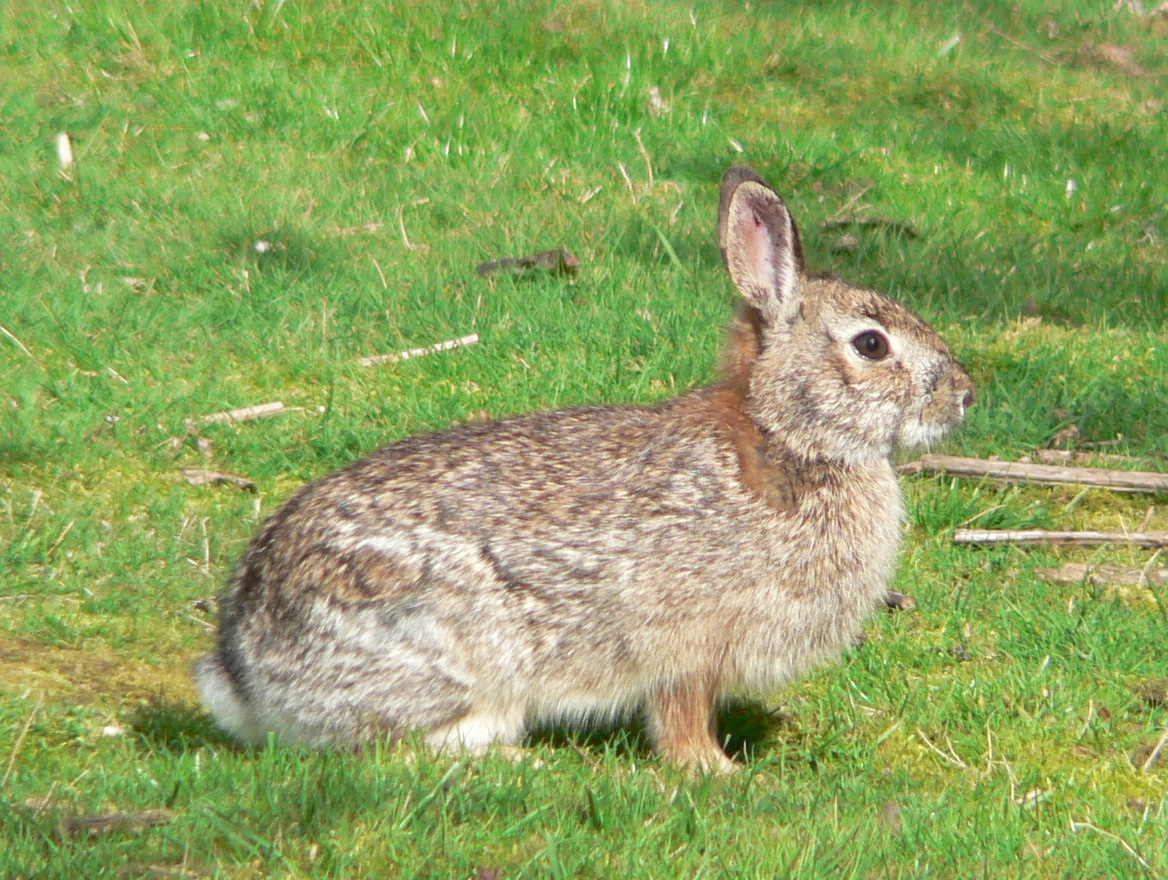
Brush rabbit

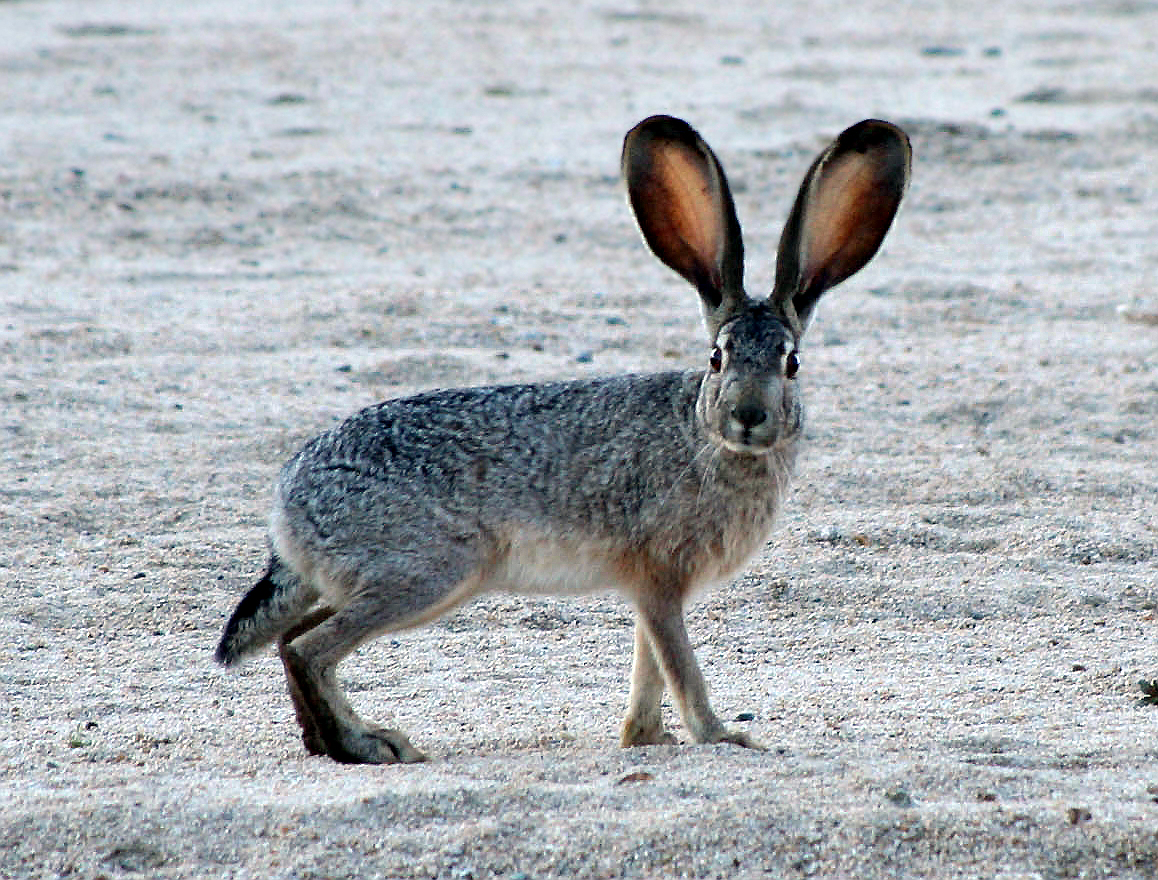
Black-tailed jackrabbit

The lagomorphs comprise two families, Leporidae (hares and rabbits), and Ochotonidae (pikas). Though they can resemble rodents, and were classified as a superfamily in that order until the early 20th century, they have since been considered a separate order. They differ from rodents in a number of physical characteristics, such as having four incisors in the upper jaw rather than two. The endangered volcano rabbit of the Trans-Mexican Volcanic Belt is the world's second smallest rabbit. In North America, pikas are not found south of southern California and northern New Mexico.

- Family: Leporidae (rabbits, hares)
  - Genus: Romerolagus
    - Volcano rabbit, R. diazi EN
  - Genus: Sylvilagus
    - Desert cottontail, S. audubonii LC
    - Brush rabbit, S. bachmani LC
      - San Jose brush rabbit, S. b. mansuetus CR
    - Mexican cottontail, S. cunicularius LC
    - Eastern cottontail, S. floridanus LC
    - Central American tapetí, S. gabbi LC
    - Tres Marias cottontail, S. graysoni EN
    - Robust cottontail, S. holzneri VU presence uncertain
    - Omilteme cottontail, S. insonus EN
  - Genus: Lepus
    - Antelope jackrabbit, L. alleni LC
    - Tamaulipas jackrabbit, L. altamirae NE
    - Black-tailed jackrabbit, L. californicus LC
    - White-sided jackrabbit, L. callotis NT
    - Tehuantepec jackrabbit, L. flavigularis EN
    - Black jackrabbit, L. insularis NT

==== Order: Eulipotyphla (shrews, hedgehogs, moles, and solenodons) ====
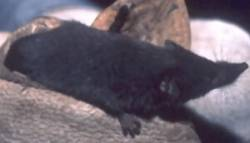
Crawford's gray shrew

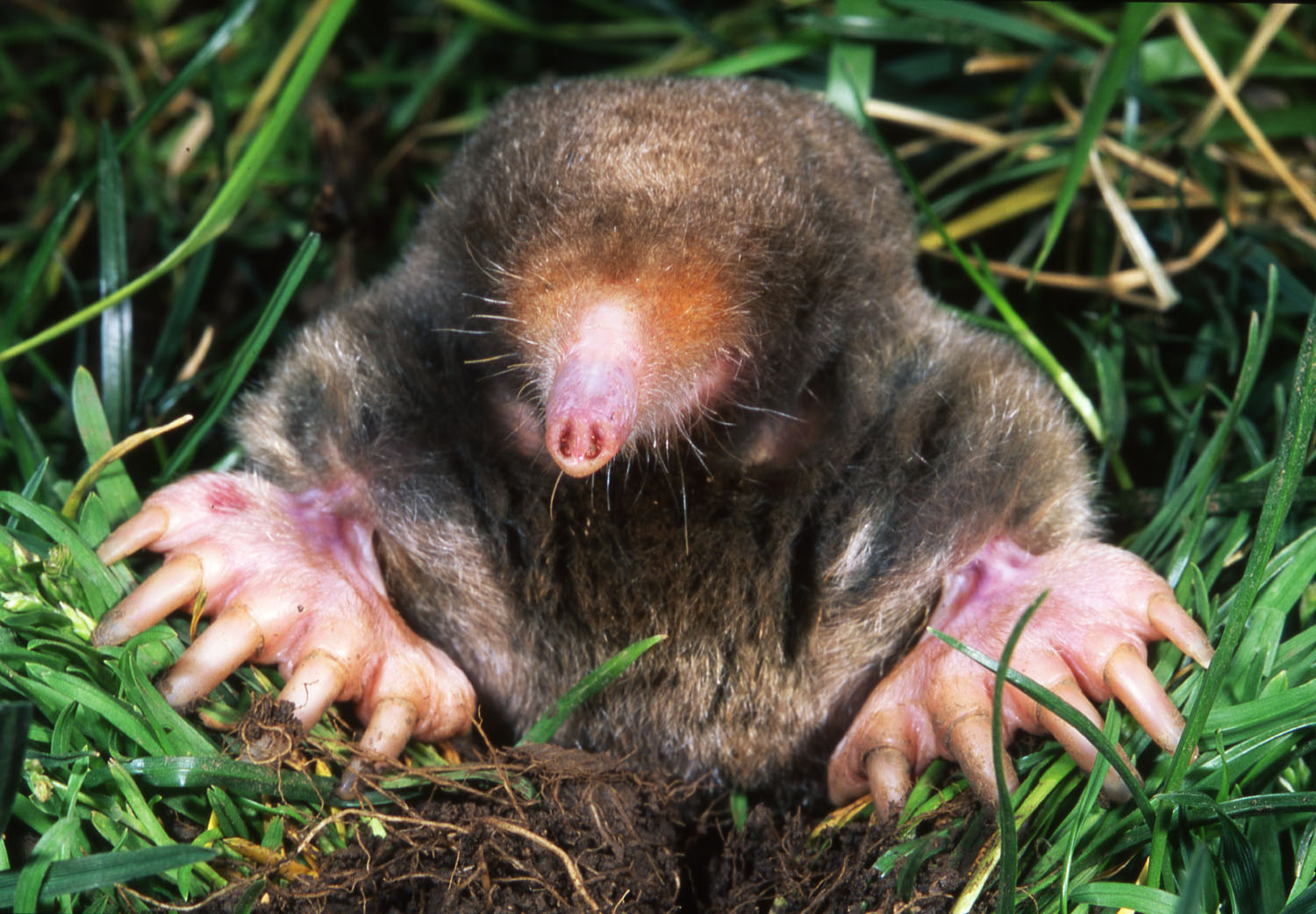
Eastern mole

Eulipotyphlans are insectivorous mammals. Shrews and solenodons closely resemble mice, hedgehogs carry spines, while moles are stout-bodied burrowers. In the Americas, moles are not present south of the northernmost tier of Mexican states, where they are rare.

- Family: Soricidae (shrews)
  - Subfamily: Soricinae
    - Tribe: Blarinini
      - Genus: Cryptotis
        - Central Mexican broad-clawed shrew, Cryptotis alticola DD
        - Goldman's broad-clawed shrew, Cryptotis goldmani LC
        - Goodwin's broad-clawed shrew, Cryptotis goodwini LC
        - Guatemalan broad-clawed shrew, Cryptotis griseoventris EN
        - Big Mexican small-eared shrew, Cryptotis magna VU
        - Yucatan small-eared shrew, Cryptotis mayensis LC
        - Merriam's small-eared shrew, Cryptotis merriami LC
        - Mexican small-eared shrew, Cryptotis mexicana LC
        - Nelson's small-eared shrew, Cryptotis nelsoni CR
        - Grizzled Mexican small-eared shrew, Cryptotis obscura LC
        - North American least shrew, Cryptotis parva LC
        - Oaxacan broad-clawed shrew, Cryptotis peregrina DD
        - Phillips' small-eared shrew, Cryptotis phillipsii VU
        - Tropical small-eared shrew, Cryptotis tropicalis DD
    - Tribe: Notiosoricini
      - Genus: Megasorex
        - Mexican shrew, Megasorex gigas LC
      - Genus: Notiosorex
        - Cockrum's gray shrew, Notiosorex cockrumi LC
        - Crawford's gray shrew, Notiosorex crawfordi LC
        - Large-eared gray shrew, Notiosorex evotis LC
        - Villa's gray shrew, Notiosorex villai VU
    - Tribe: Soricini
      - Genus: Sorex
        - Arizona shrew, Sorex arizonae LC
        - Zacatecas shrew, Sorex emarginatus LC
        - Sorex ixtlanensis DD
        - Large-toothed shrew, Sorex macrodon VU
        - Sorex mediopua LC
        - Carmen Mountain shrew, Sorex milleri VU
        - Montane shrew, Sorex monticolus LC
        - Mexican long-tailed shrew, Sorex oreopolus LC
        - Orizaba long-tailed shrew, Sorex orizabae LC
        - Ornate shrew, Sorex ornatus LC
        - Saussure's shrew, Sorex saussurei LC
        - Sclater's shrew, Sorex sclateri CR
        - San Cristobal shrew, Sorex stizodon CR
        - Chestnut-bellied shrew, Sorex ventralis LC
        - Veracruz shrew, Sorex veraecrucis LC
        - Verapaz shrew, Sorex veraepacis LC
- Family: Talpidae (moles)
  - Subfamily: Scalopinae
    - Tribe: Scalopini
      - Genus: Scalopus
        - Eastern mole, Scalopus aquaticus LC
      - Genus: Scapanus
        - Southern broad-footed mole, Scapanus occultus
        - Mexican mole, Scapanus anthonyi

==== Order: Chiroptera (bats) ====
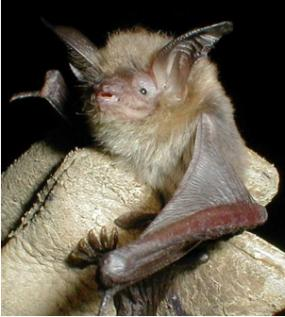
Southwestern myotis

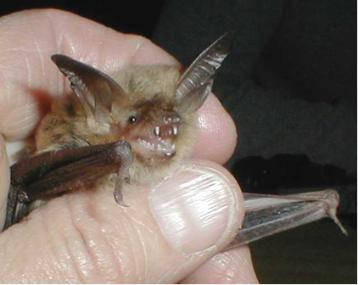
Fringed myotis

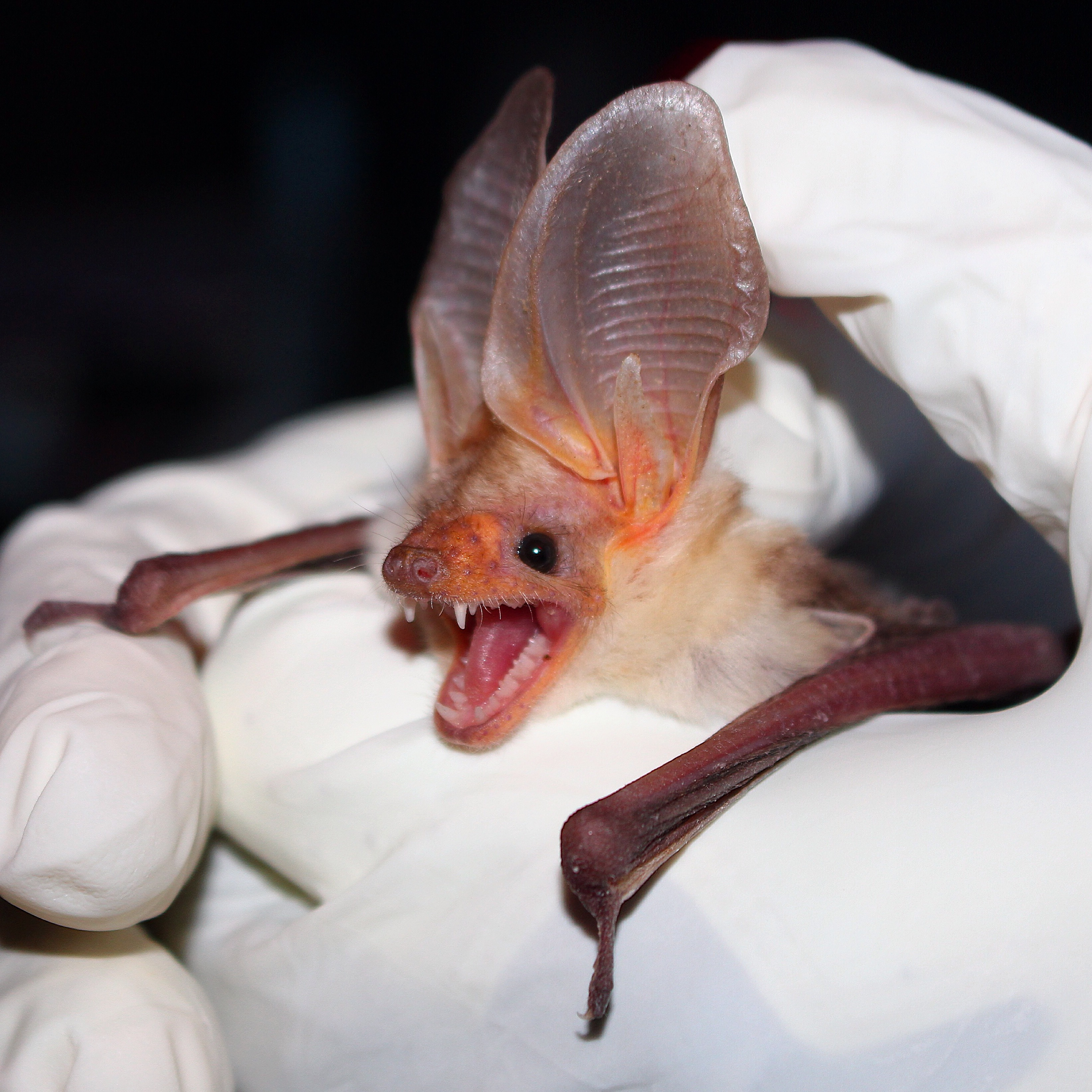
Pallid bat

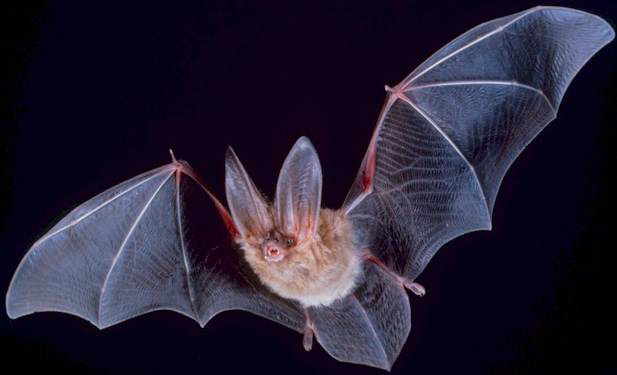
Townsend's big-eared bat

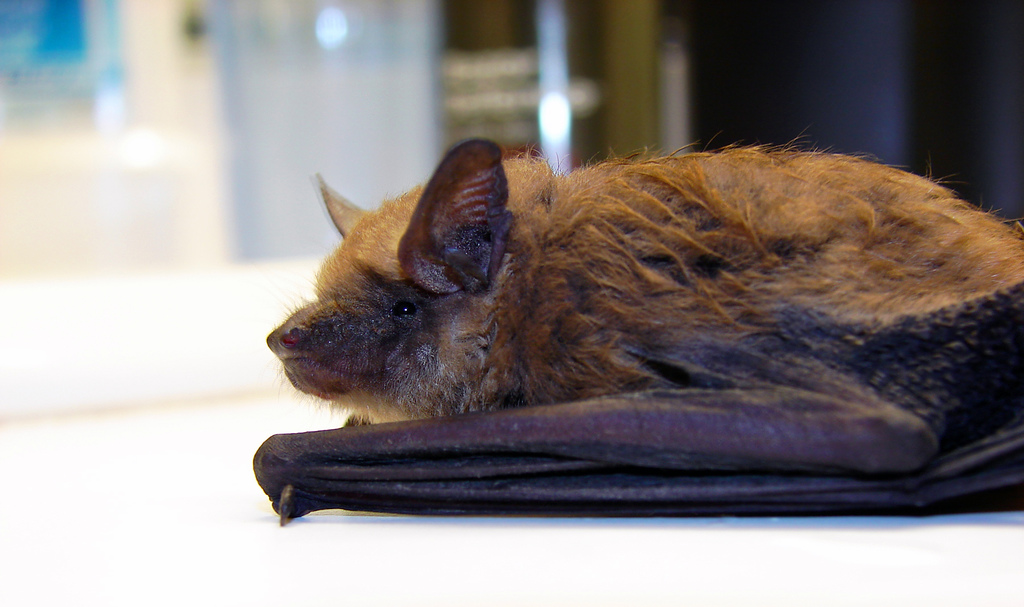
Big brown bat

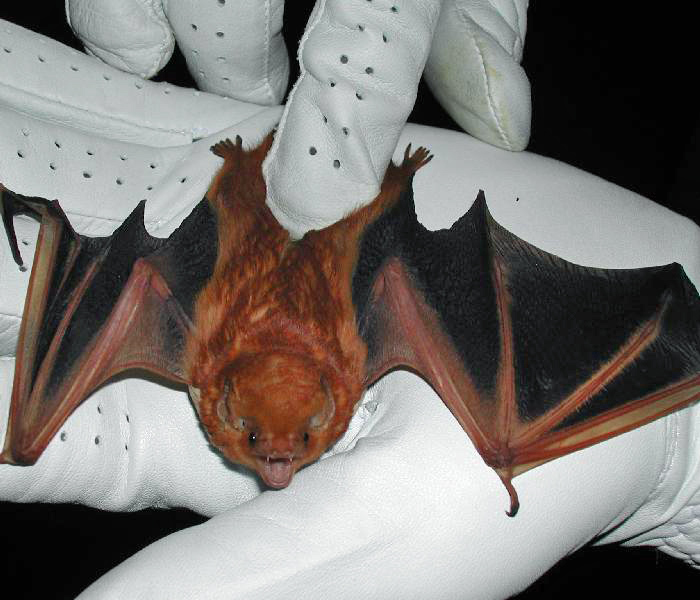
Eastern red bat

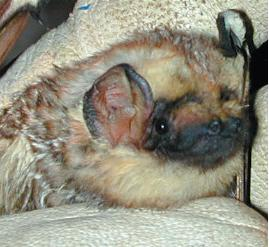
Hoary bat

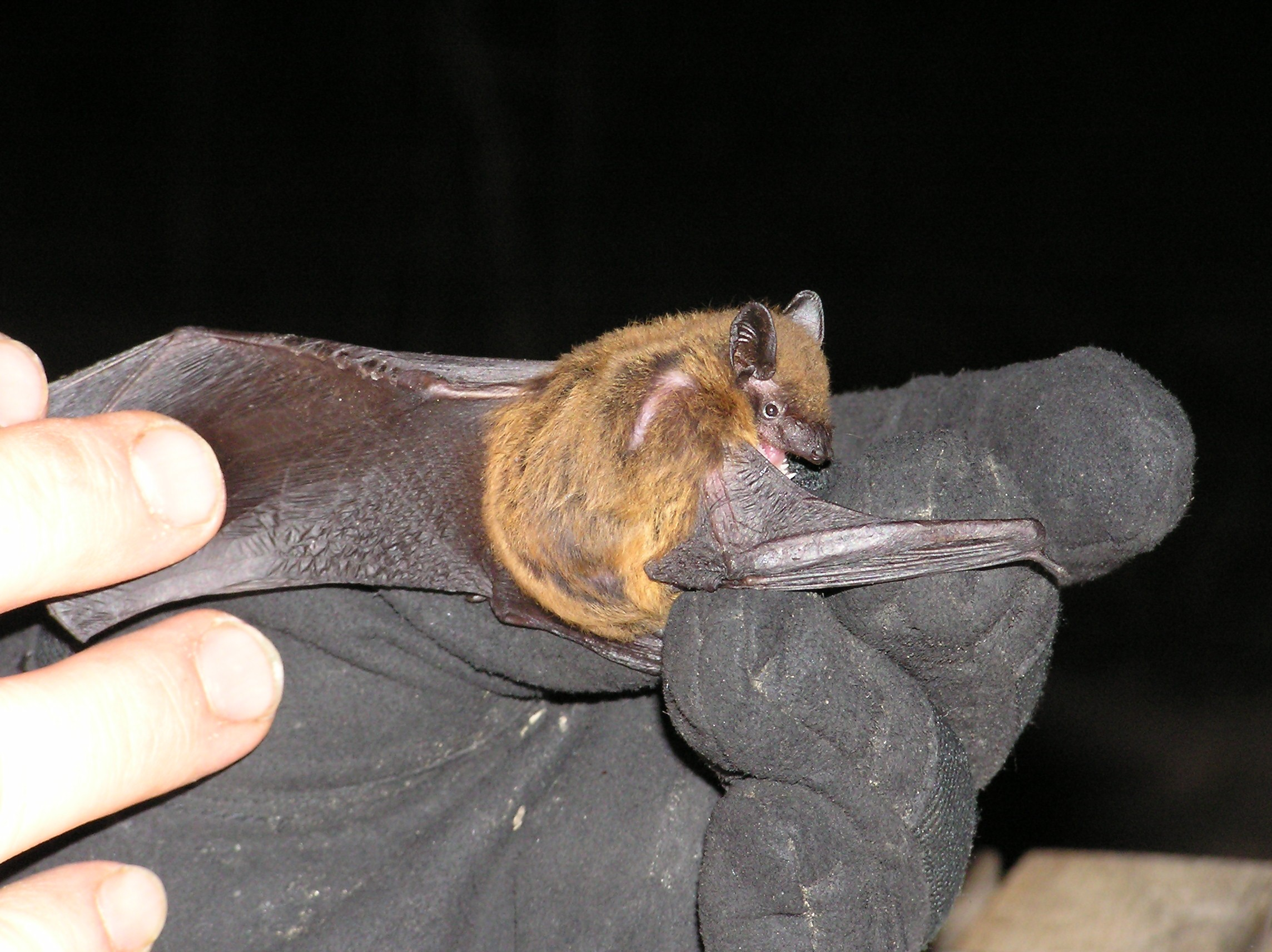
Evening bat

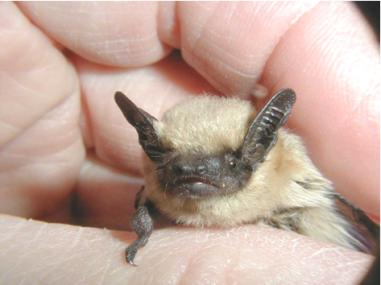
Western pipistrelle

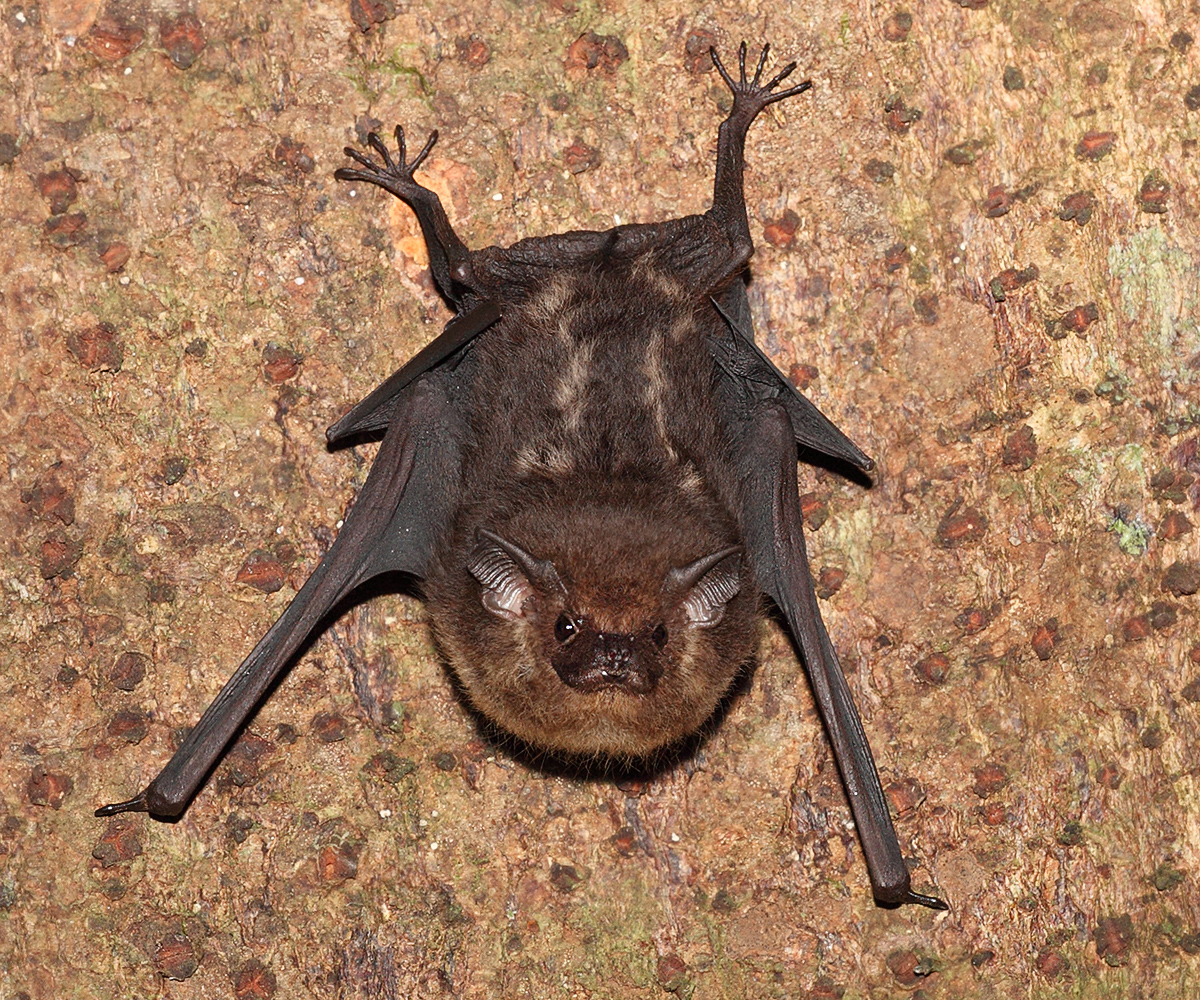
Greater or lesser sac-winged bat

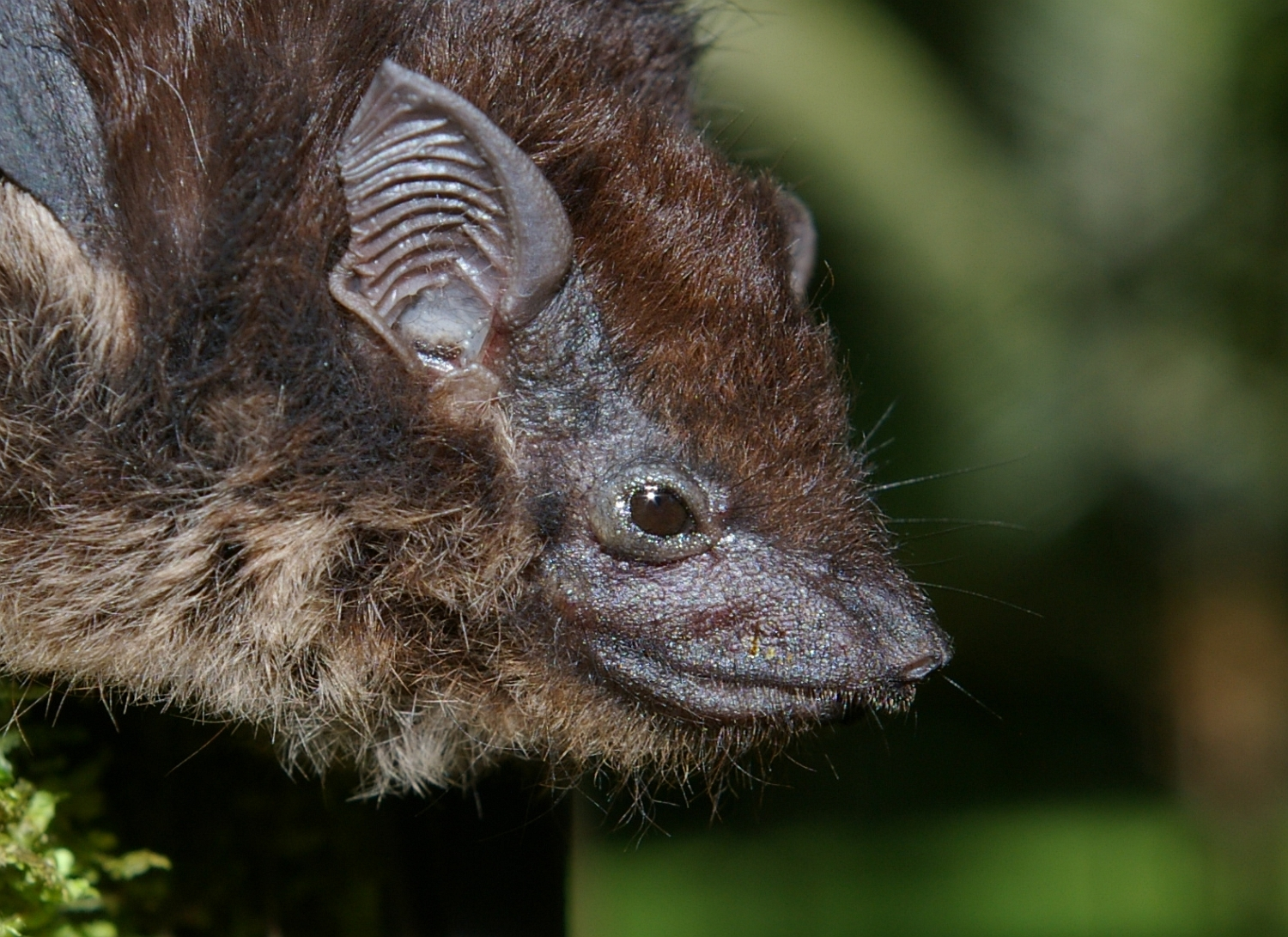
Greater sac-winged bat

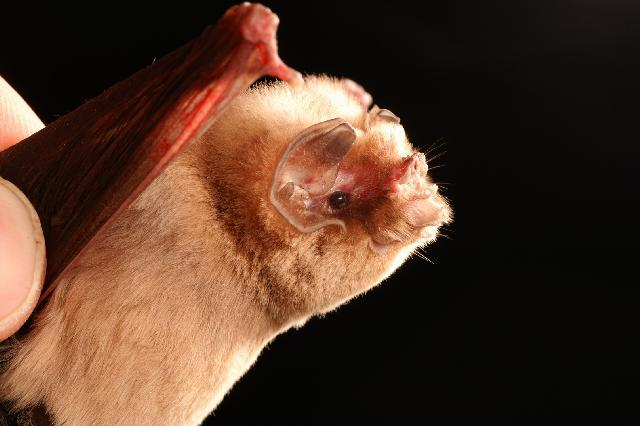
Ghost-faced bat

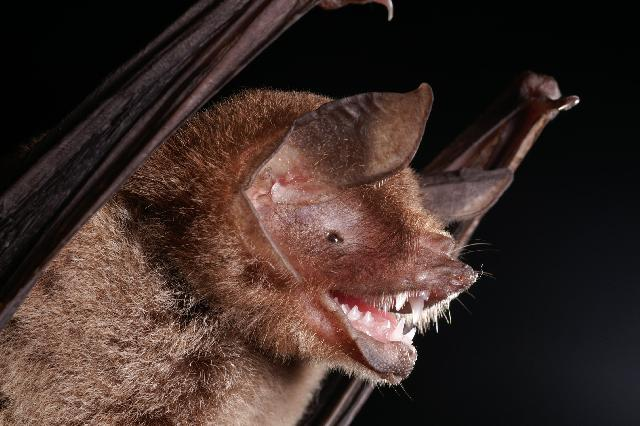
Parnell's mustached bat

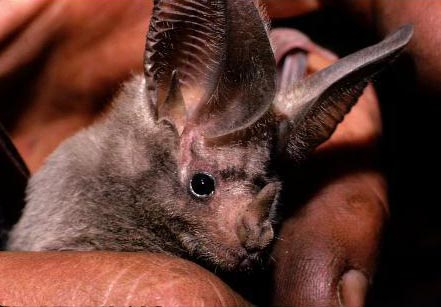
California leaf-nosed bat

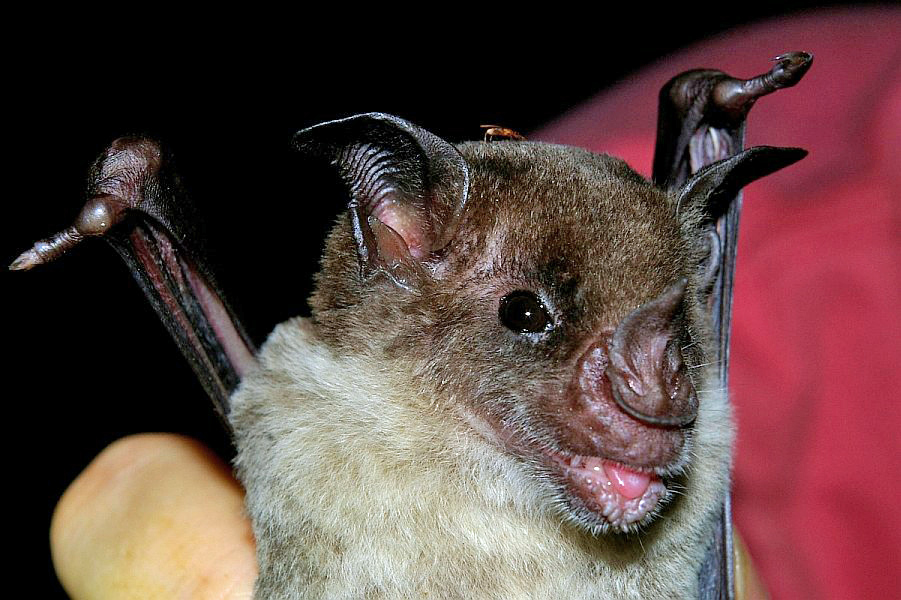
Pale spear-nosed bat

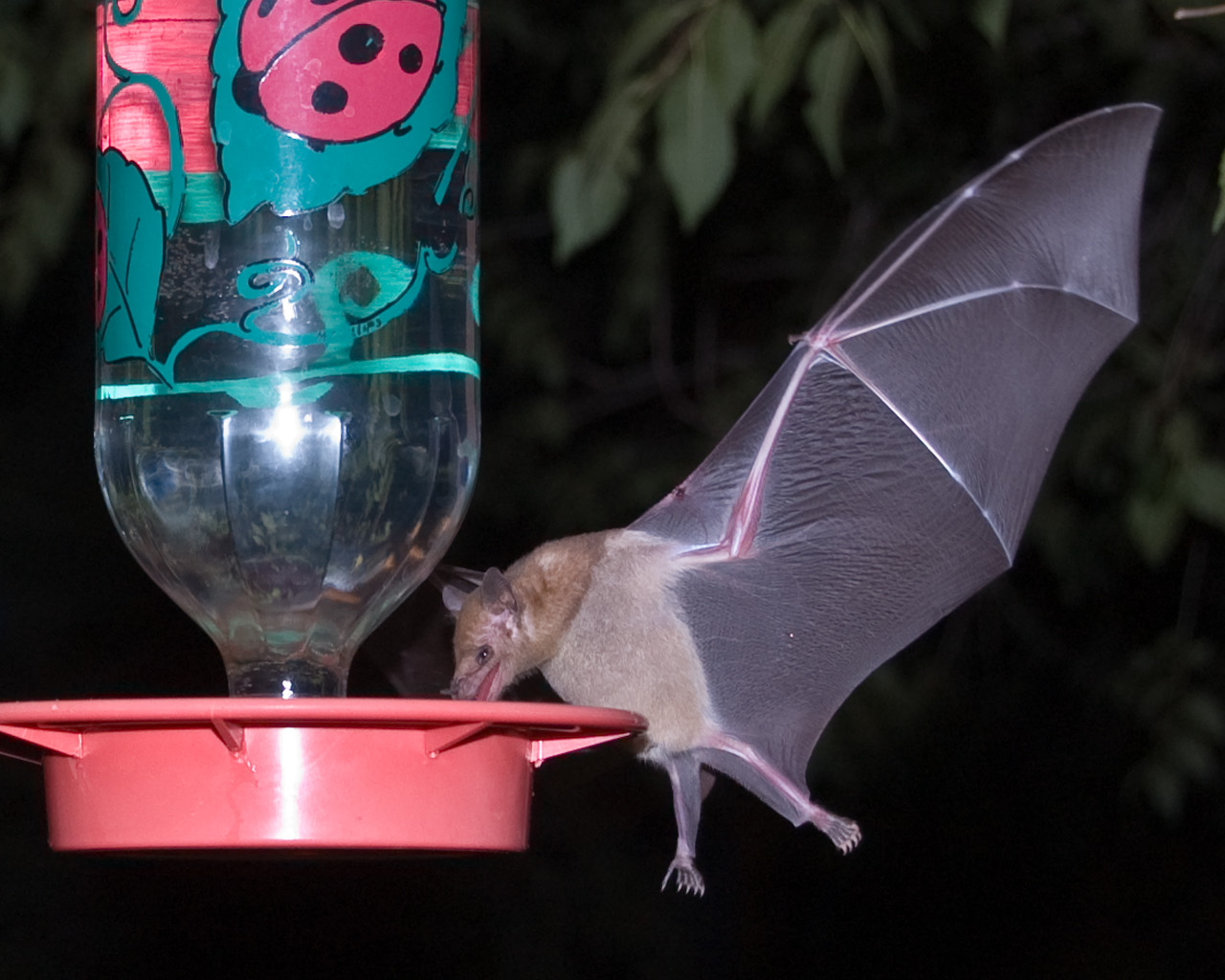
Mexican long-tongued bat

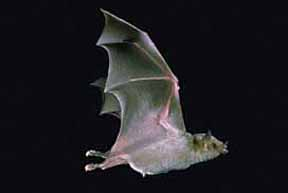
Greater long-nosed bat

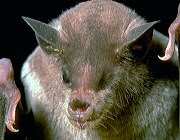
Lesser long-nosed bat

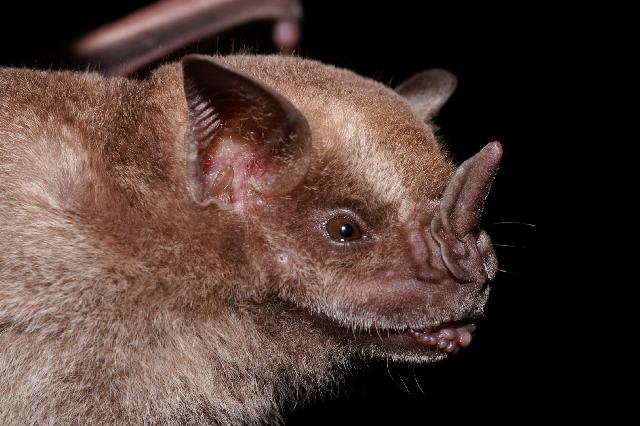
Jamaican fruit bat

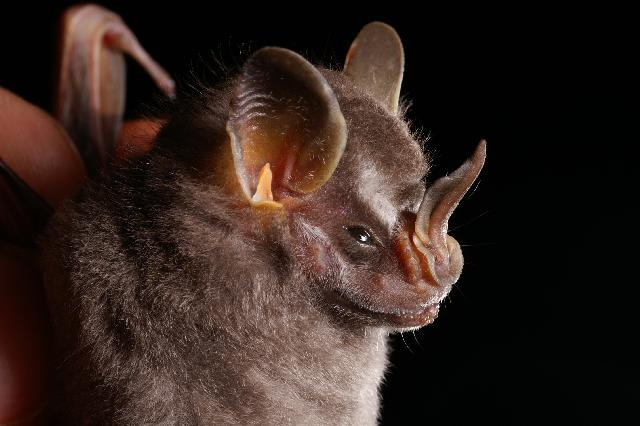
Pygmy fruit-eating bat

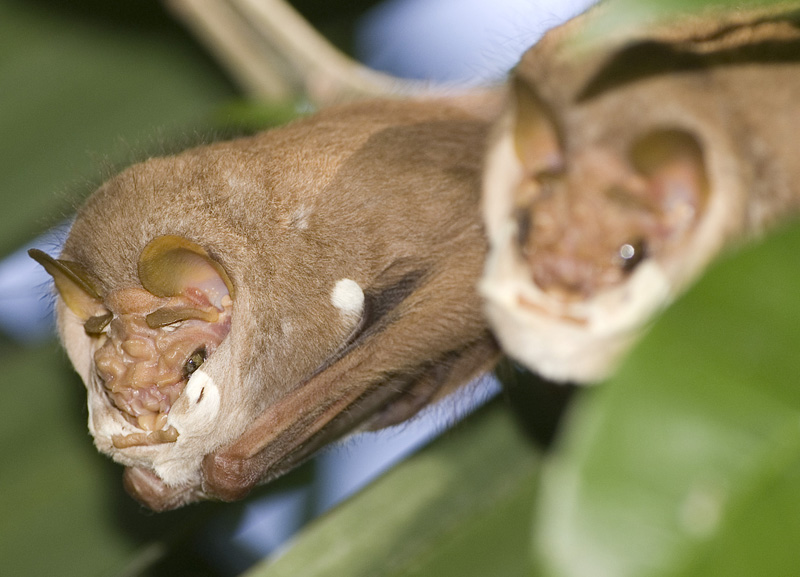
Wrinkle-faced bats

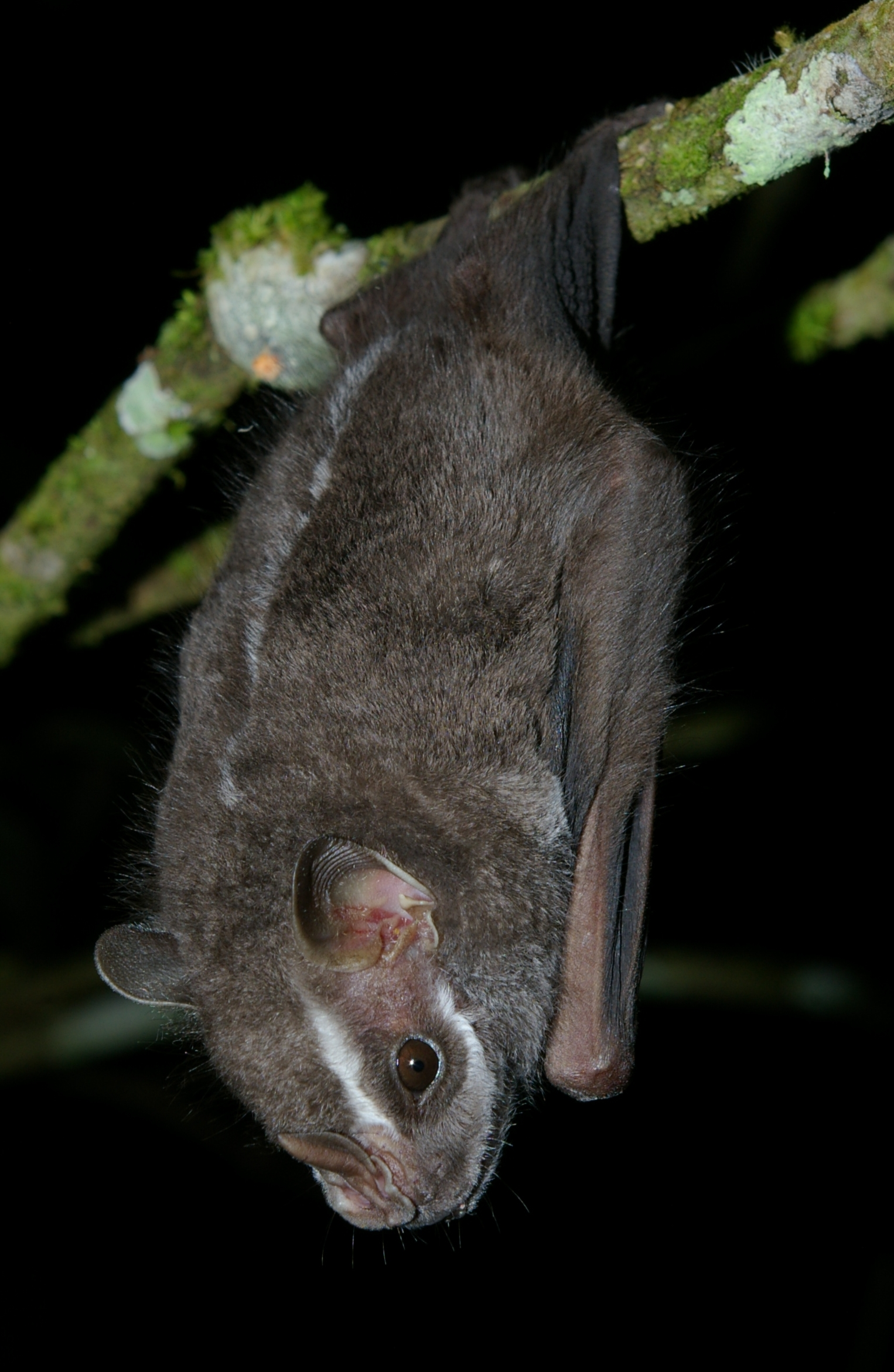
Salvin's big-eyed bat

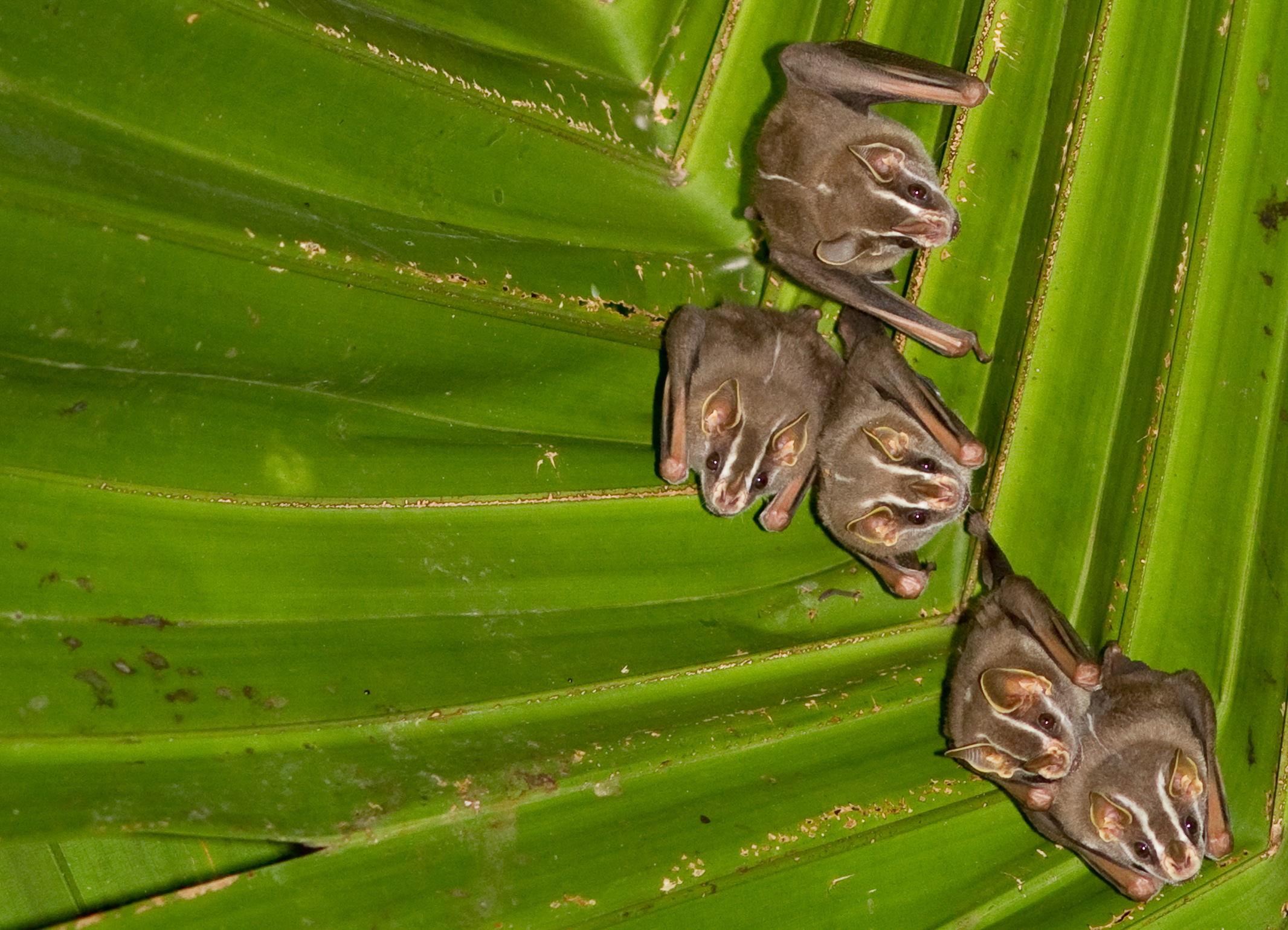
Tent-making bats

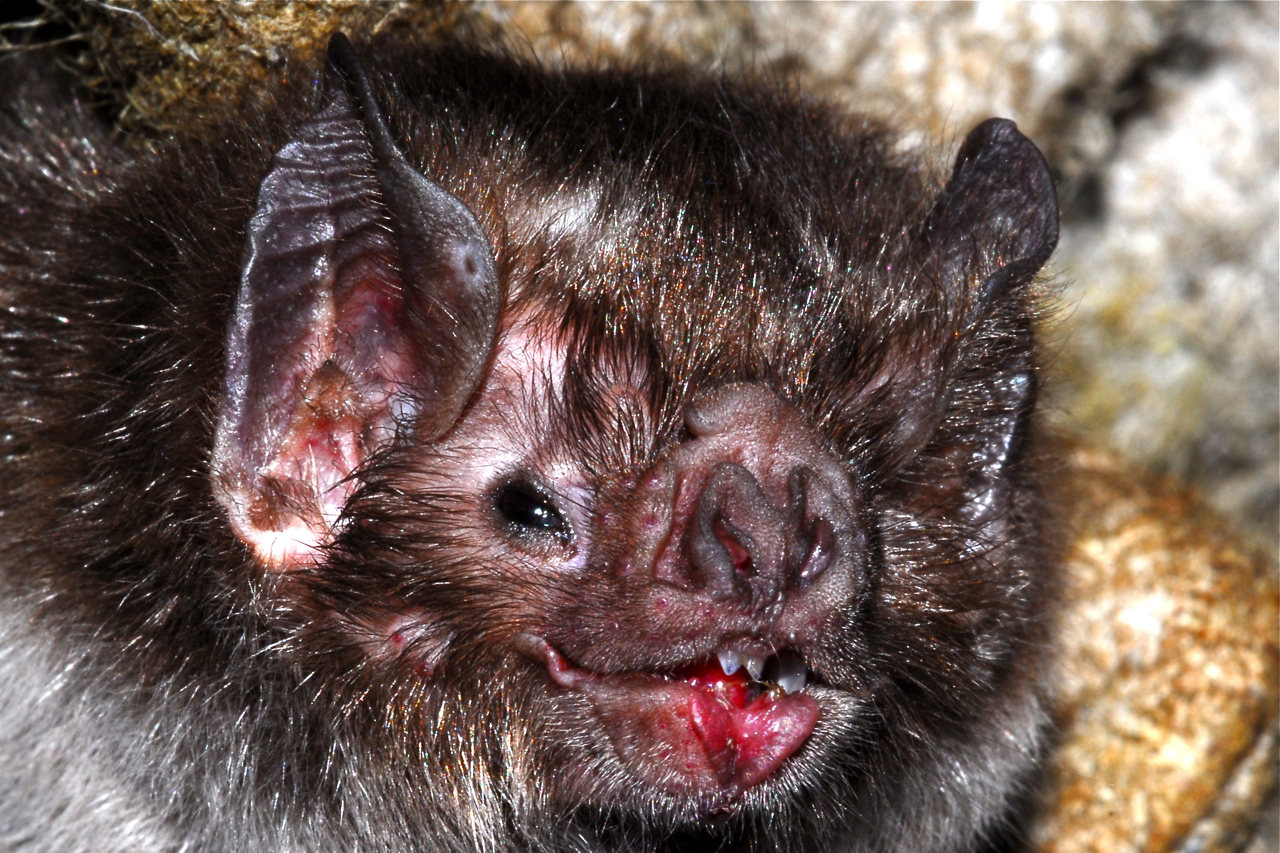
Common vampire bat

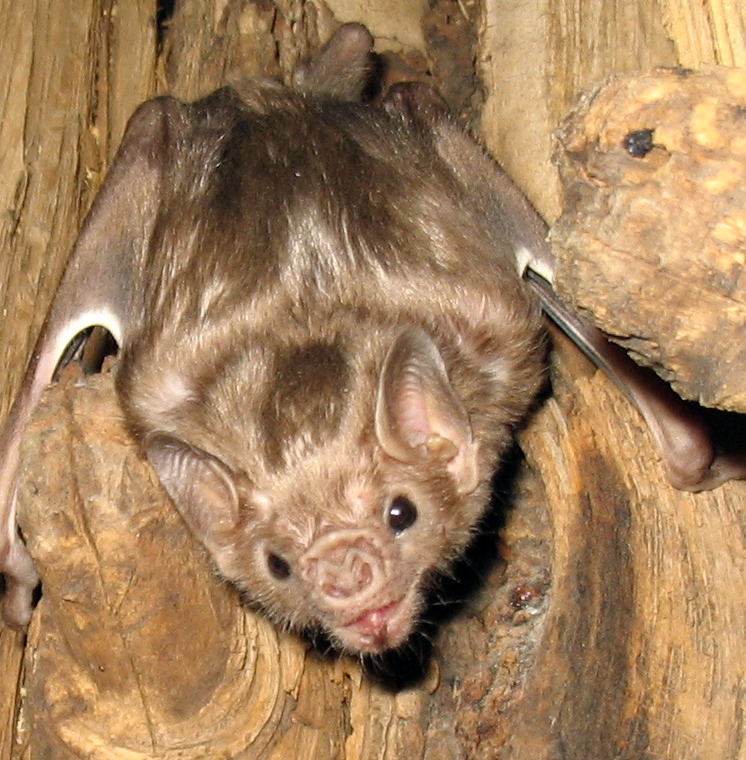
White-winged vampire bat

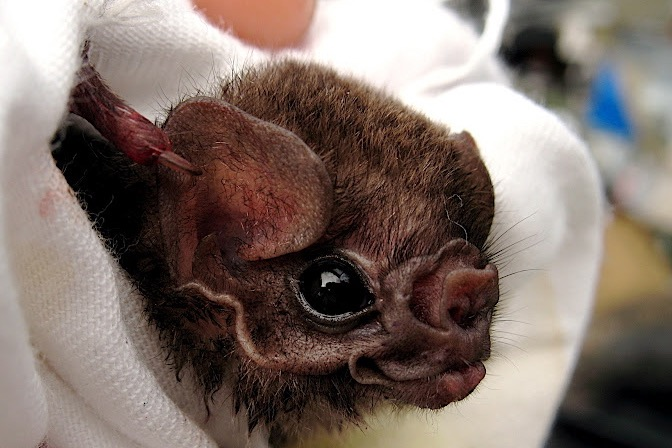
Hairy-legged vampire bat

The bats' most distinguishing feature is that their forelimbs are developed as wings, making them the only mammals capable of flight. Bat species account for about 20% of all mammals.

- Family: Noctilionidae
  - Genus: Noctilio
    - Lesser bulldog bat, Noctilio albiventris LC
    - Greater bulldog bat, Noctilio leporinus LC
- Family: Vespertilionidae
  - Subfamily: Myotinae
    - Genus: Lasionycteris
      - Silver-haired bat, Lasionycteris noctivagans LC
    - Genus: Myotis
      - Silver-tipped myotis, Myotis albescens LC
      - Southwestern myotis, Myotis auriculus LC
      - California myotis, Myotis californicus LC
      - Western small-footed myotis, Myotis ciliolabrum LC
      - Elegant myotis, Myotis elegans LC
      - Long-eared myotis, Myotis evotis LC
      - Findley's myotis, Myotis findleyi EN
      - Cinnamon myotis, Myotis fortidens LC
      - Hairy-legged myotis, Myotis keaysi LC
      - Little brown bat, Myotis lucifugus LC
      - Dark-nosed small-footed myotis, Myotis melanorhinus LC
      - Black myotis, Myotis nigricans LC
      - Arizona myotis, Myotis occultus LC
      - Peninsular myotis, Myotis peninsularis EN
      - Flat-headed myotis, Myotis planiceps EN
      - Fringed myotis, Myotis thysanodes LC
      - Cave myotis, Myotis velifer LC
      - Fish-eating bat, Myotis vivesi VU
      - Long-legged myotis, Myotis volans LC
      - Yuma myotis, Myotis yumanensis LC
  - Subfamily: Vespertilioninae
    - Genus: Antrozous
      - Pallid bat, Antrozous pallidus LC
    - Genus: Bauerus
      - Van Gelder's bat, Bauerus dubiaquercus NT
    - Genus: Corynorhinus
      - Mexican big-eared bat, Corynorhinus mexicanus NT
      - Townsend's big-eared bat, Corynorhinus townsendii LC
    - Genus: Eptesicus
      - Brazilian brown bat, Eptesicus brasiliensis LC
      - Argentine brown bat, Eptesicus furinalis LC
      - Big brown bat, Eptesicus fuscus LC
    - Genus: Euderma
      - Spotted bat, Euderma maculatum LC
    - Genus: Idionycteris
      - Allen's big-eared bat, Idionycteris phyllotis LC
    - Genus: Lasiurus
      - Desert red bat, Lasiurus blossevillii LC
      - Eastern red bat, Lasiurus borealis LC
      - Hoary bat, Lasiurus cinereus LC
      - Southern yellow bat, Lasiurus ega LC
      - Northern yellow bat, Lasiurus intermedius LC
      - Seminole bat, Lasiurus seminolus LC
      - Western yellow bat, Lasiurus xanthinus LC
    - Genus: Nycticeius
      - Evening bat, Nycticeius humeralis LC
    - Genus: Pipistrellus
      - Western pipistrelle, Pipistrellus hesperus LC
      - Eastern pipistrelle, Pipistrellus subflavus LC
    - Genus: Rhogeessa
      - Yucatan yellow bat, Rhogeessa aeneus LC
      - Allen's yellow bat, Rhogeessa alleni LC
      - Genoways's yellow bat, Rhogeessa genowaysi EN
      - Slender yellow bat, Rhogeessa gracilis LC
      - Least yellow bat, Rhogeessa mira VU
      - Little yellow bat, Rhogeessa parvula LC
      - Black-winged little yellow bat, Rhogeessa tumida LC
- Family: Molossidae
  - Genus: Cynomops
    - Mexican dog-faced bat, Cynomops mexicanus LC
  - Genus: Eumops
    - Black bonneted bat, Eumops auripendulus LC
    - Dwarf bonneted bat, Eumops bonariensis LC
    - Wagner's bonneted bat, Eumops glaucinus LC
    - Sanborn's bonneted bat, Eumops hansae LC
    - Western mastiff bat, Eumops perotis LC
    - Underwood's bonneted bat, Eumops underwoodi LC
  - Genus: Molossus
    - Aztec mastiff bat, Molossus aztecus LC
    - Coiban mastiff bat, Molossus coibensis LC
    - Velvety free-tailed bat, Molossus molossus LC
    - Miller's mastiff bat, Molossus pretiosus LC
    - Black mastiff bat, Molossus rufus LC
    - Sinaloan mastiff bat, Molossus sinaloae LC
  - Genus: Nyctinomops
    - Peale's free-tailed bat, Nyctinomops aurispinosus LC
    - Pocketed free-tailed bat, Nyctinomops femorosaccus LC
    - Broad-eared bat, Nyctinomops laticaudatus LC
    - Big free-tailed bat, Nyctinomops macrotis LC
  - Genus: Promops
    - Big crested mastiff bat, Promops centralis LC
  - Genus: Tadarida
    - Mexican free-tailed bat, Tadarida brasiliensis LC
- Family: Emballonuridae
  - Genus: Balantiopteryx
    - Thomas's sac-winged bat, Balantiopteryx io VU
    - Gray sac-winged bat, Balantiopteryx plicata LC
  - Genus: Centronycteris
    - Thomas's shaggy bat, Centronycteris centralis LC
  - Genus: Diclidurus
    - Northern ghost bat, Diclidurus albus LC
  - Genus: Peropteryx
    - Greater dog-like bat, Peropteryx kappleri LC
    - Lesser doglike bat, Peropteryx macrotis LC
  - Genus: Rhynchonycteris
    - Proboscis bat, Rhynchonycteris naso LC
  - Genus: Saccopteryx
    - Greater sac-winged bat, Saccopteryx bilineata LC
    - Lesser sac-winged bat, Saccopteryx leptura LC
- Family: Mormoopidae
  - Genus: Mormoops
    - Ghost-faced bat, Mormoops megalophylla LC
  - Genus: Pteronotus
    - Davy's naked-backed bat, Pteronotus davyi LC
    - Big naked-backed bat, Pteronotus gymnonotus LC
    - Parnell's mustached bat, Pteronotus parnellii LC
    - Wagner's mustached bat, Pteronotus personatus LC
- Family: Phyllostomidae
  - Subfamily: Phyllostominae
    - Genus: Chrotopterus
      - Big-eared woolly bat, Chrotopterus auritus LC
    - Genus: Glyphonycteris
      - Tricolored big-eared bat, Glyphonycteris sylvestris LC
    - Genus: Lampronycteris
      - Yellow-throated big-eared bat, Lampronycteris brachyotis LC
    - Genus: Lonchorhina
      - Tomes's sword-nosed bat, Lonchorhina aurita LC
    - Genus: Lophostoma
      - Pygmy round-eared bat, Lophostoma brasiliense LC
      - Davis's round-eared bat, Lophostoma evotis LC
    - Genus: Macrophyllum
      - Long-legged bat, Macrophyllum macrophyllum LC
    - Genus: Macrotus
      - California leaf-nosed bat, Macrotus californicus LC
      - Waterhouse's leaf-nosed bat, Macrotus waterhousii LC
    - Genus: Micronycteris
      - Common big-eared bat, Micronycteris microtis LC
      - Schmidts's big-eared bat, Micronycteris schmidtorum LC
    - Genus: Mimon
      - Cozumelan golden bat, Mimon cozumelae LC
      - Striped hairy-nosed bat, Mimon crenulatum LC
    - Genus: Phylloderma
      - Pale-faced bat, Phylloderma stenops LC
    - Genus: Phyllostomus
      - Pale spear-nosed bat, Phyllostomus discolor LC
    - Genus: Tonatia
      - Stripe-headed round-eared bat, Tonatia saurophila LC
    - Genus: Trachops
      - Fringe-lipped bat, Trachops cirrhosus LC
    - Genus: Trinycteris
      - Niceforo's big-eared bat, Trinycteris nicefori LC
    - Genus: Vampyrum
      - Spectral bat, Vampyrum spectrum NT
  - Subfamily: Glossophaginae
    - Genus: Anoura
      - Geoffroy's tailless bat, Anoura geoffroyi LC
    - Genus: Choeroniscus
      - Godman's long-tailed bat, Choeroniscus godmani LC
    - Genus: Choeronycteris
      - Mexican long-tongued bat, Choeronycteris mexicana NT
    - Genus: Glossophaga
      - Commissaris's long-tongued bat, Glossophaga commissarisi LC
      - Gray long-tongued bat, Glossophaga leachii LC
      - Western long-tongued bat, Glossophaga morenoi LC
      - Pallas's long-tongued bat, Glossophaga soricina LC
    - Genus: Hylonycteris
      - Underwood's long-tongued bat, Hylonycteris underwoodi LC
    - Genus: Leptonycteris
      - Greater long-nosed bat, Leptonycteris nivalis EN
      - Lesser long-nosed bat, Leptonycteris yerbabuenae VU
    - Genus: Lichonycteris
      - Dark long-tongued bat, Lichonycteris obscura LC
    - Genus: Musonycteris
      - Banana bat, Musonycteris harrisoni VU
  - Subfamily: Carolliinae
    - Genus: Carollia
      - Seba's short-tailed bat, Carollia perspicillata LC
      - Sowell's short-tailed bat, Carollia sowelli LC
      - Gray short-tailed bat, Carollia subrufa LC
  - Subfamily: Stenodermatinae
    - Genus: Artibeus
      - Hairy fruit-eating bat, Artibeus hirsutus LC
      - Jamaican fruit bat, Artibeus jamaicensis LC
      - Great fruit-eating bat, Artibeus lituratus LC
    - Genus: Centurio
      - Wrinkle-faced bat, Centurio senex LC
    - Genus: Chiroderma
      - Salvin's big-eyed bat, Chiroderma salvini LC
      - Hairy big-eyed bat, Chiroderma villosum LC
    - Genus: Dermanura
      - Aztec fruit-eating bat, Dermanura azteca LC
      - Pygmy fruit-eating bat, Dermanura phaeotis LC
      - Toltec fruit-eating bat, Dermanura tolteca LC
      - Thomas's fruit-eating bat, Dermanura watsoni LC
    - Genus: Enchisthenes
      - Velvety fruit-eating bat, Enchisthenes hartii LC
    - Genus: Platyrrhinus
      - Heller's broad-nosed bat, Platyrrhinus helleri LC
    - Genus: Sturnira
      - Little yellow-shouldered bat, Sturnira lilium LC
      - Highland yellow-shouldered bat, Sturnira ludovici LC
    - Genus: Uroderma
      - Tent-making bat, Uroderma bilobatum LC
      - Brown tent-making bat, Uroderma magnirostrum LC
    - Genus: Vampyressa
      - Northern little yellow-eared bat, Vampyressa thyone LC
    - Genus: Vampyrodes
      - Great stripe-faced bat, Vampyrodes caraccioli LC
  - Subfamily: Desmodontinae
    - Genus: Desmodus
      - Common vampire bat, Desmodus rotundus LC
    - Genus: Diaemus
      - White-winged vampire bat, Diaemus youngi LC
    - Genus: Diphylla
      - Hairy-legged vampire bat, Diphylla ecaudata LC
- Family: Natalidae
  - Genus: Natalus
    - Natalus lanatus LC
    - Mexican greater funnel-eared bat, Natalus mexicanus LC
- Family: Thyropteridae
  - Genus: Thyroptera
    - Spix's disk-winged bat, Thyroptera tricolor LC

==== Order: Carnivora (carnivorans) ====
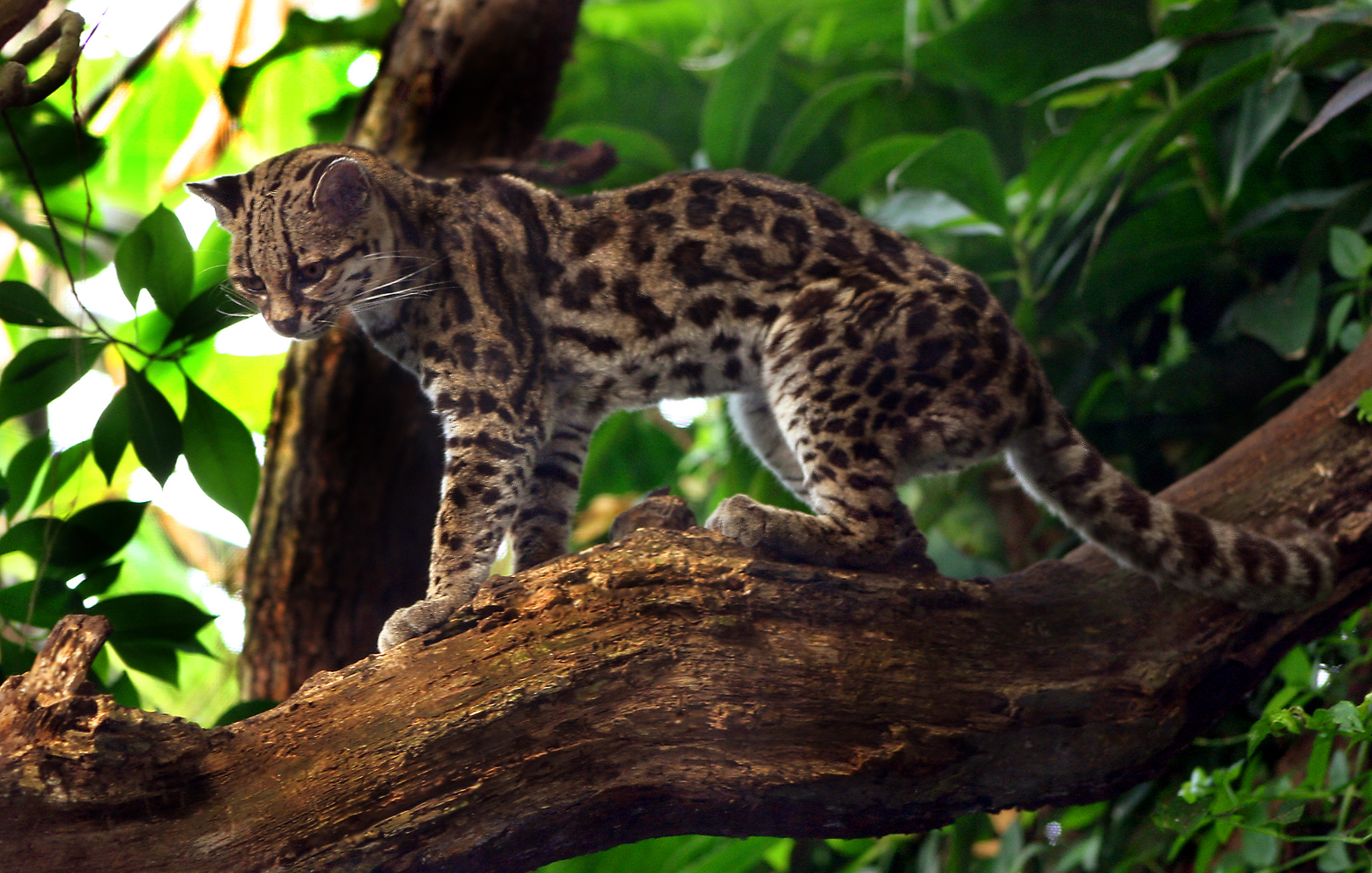
Margay

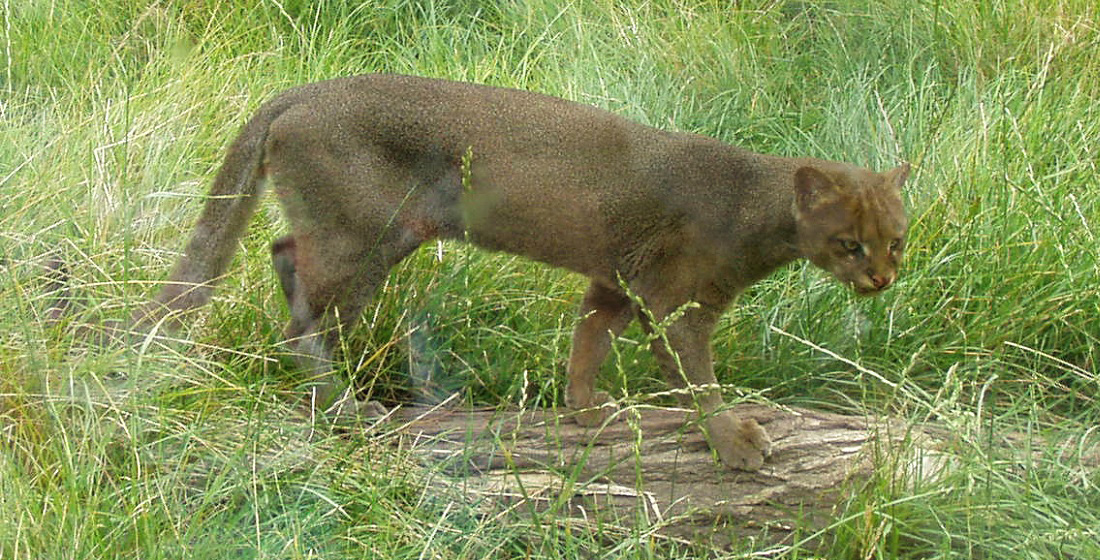
Jaguarundi

Jaguar

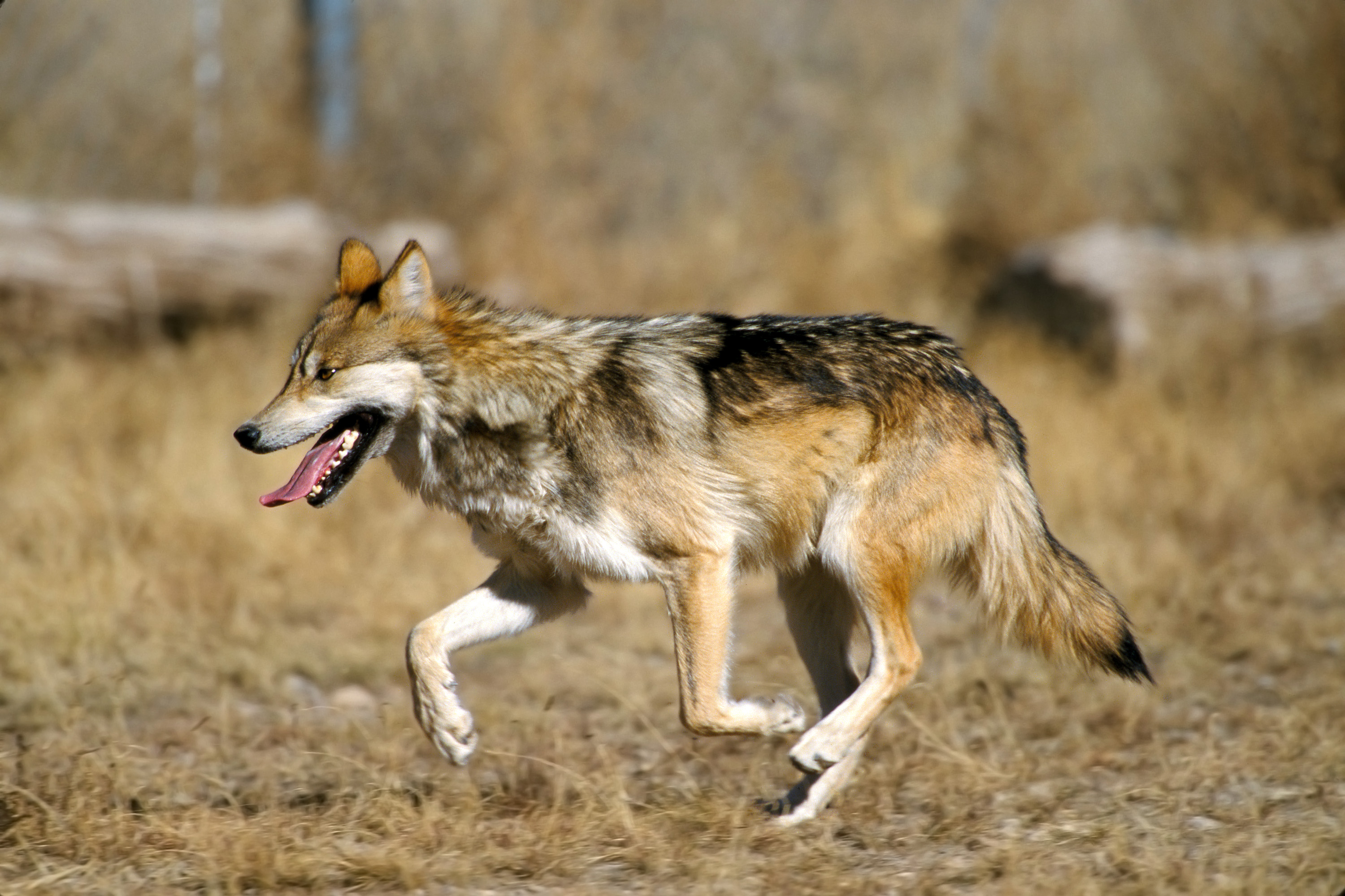
Mexican wolf

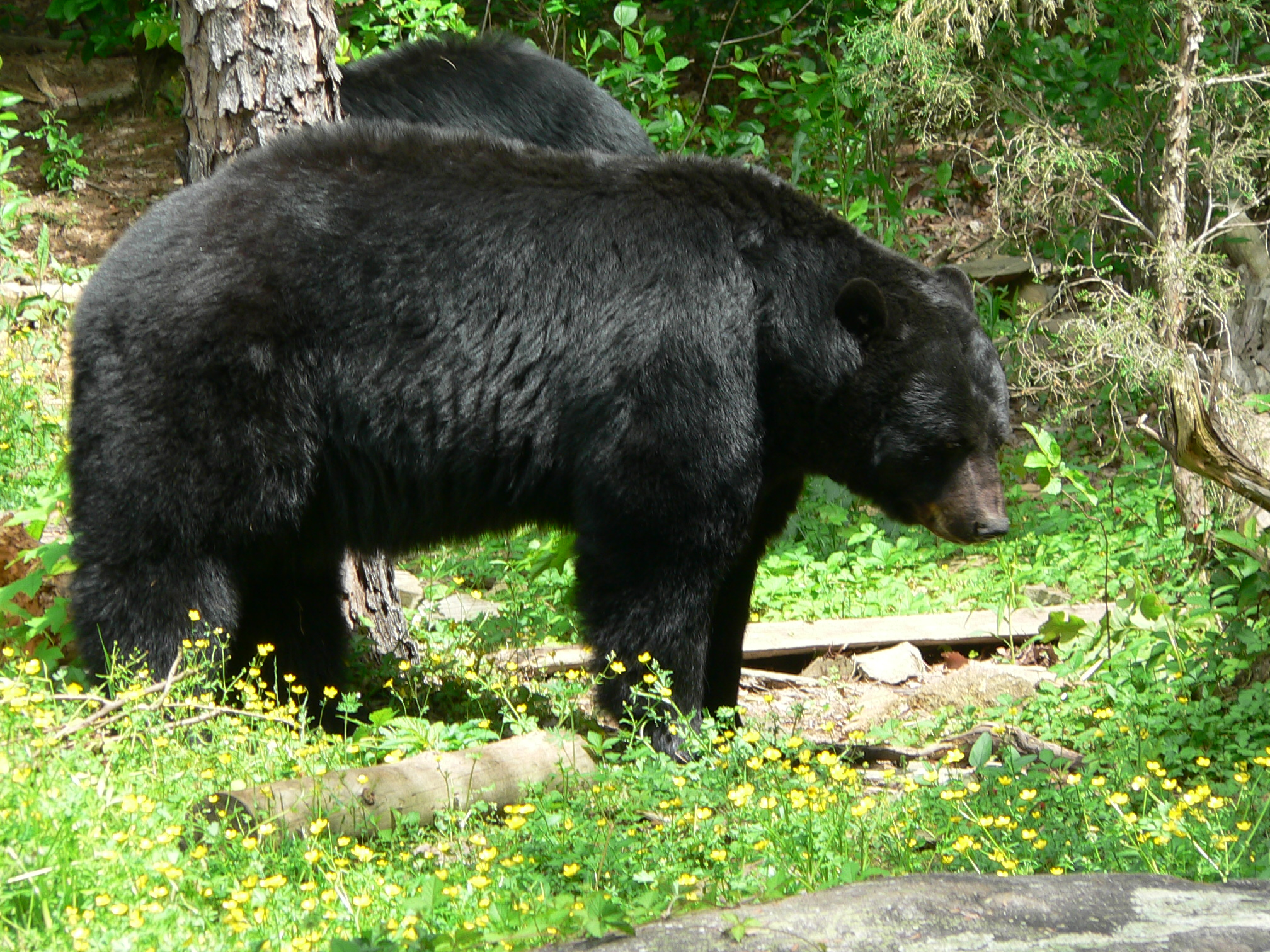
American black bear

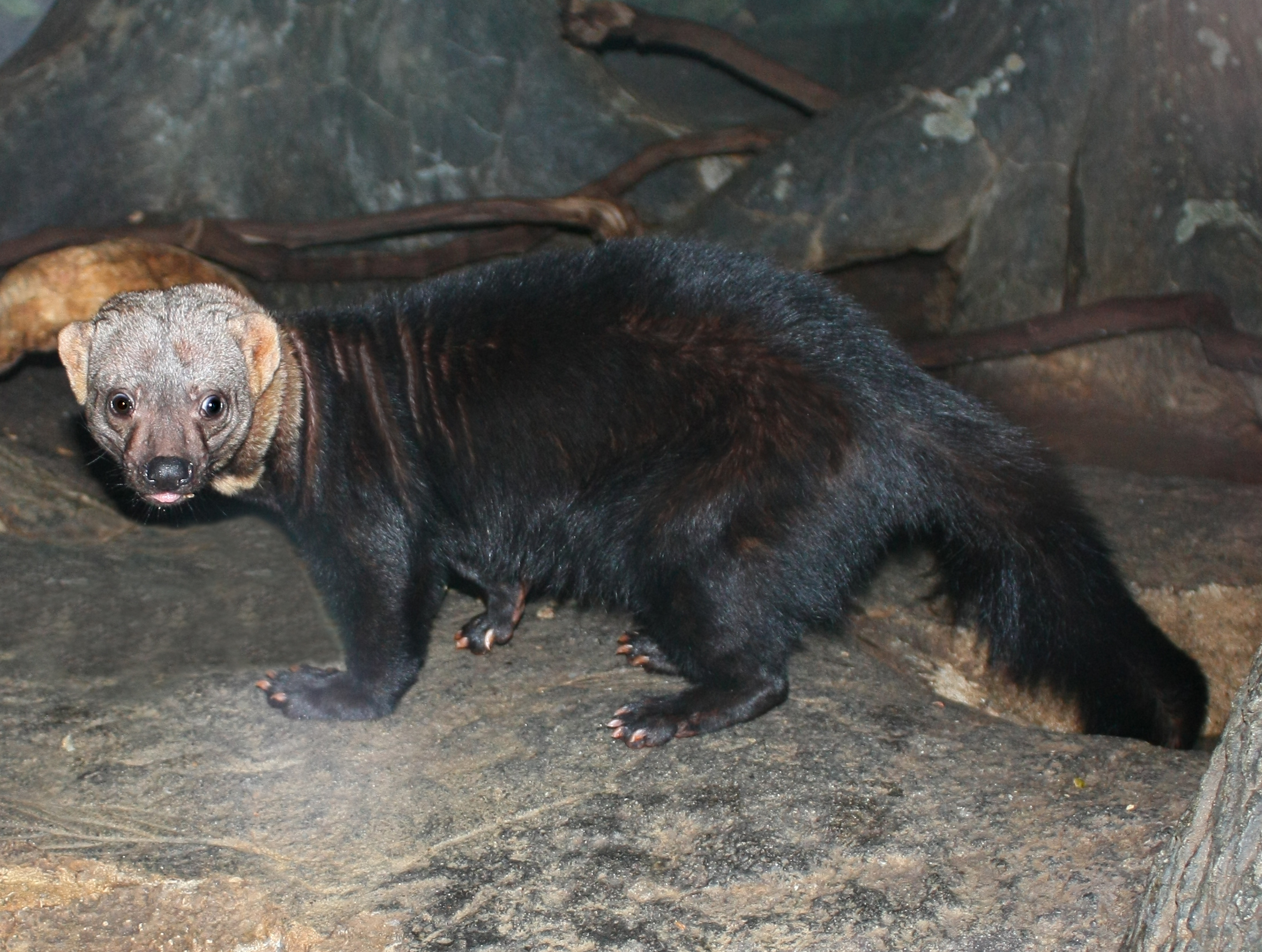
Tayra

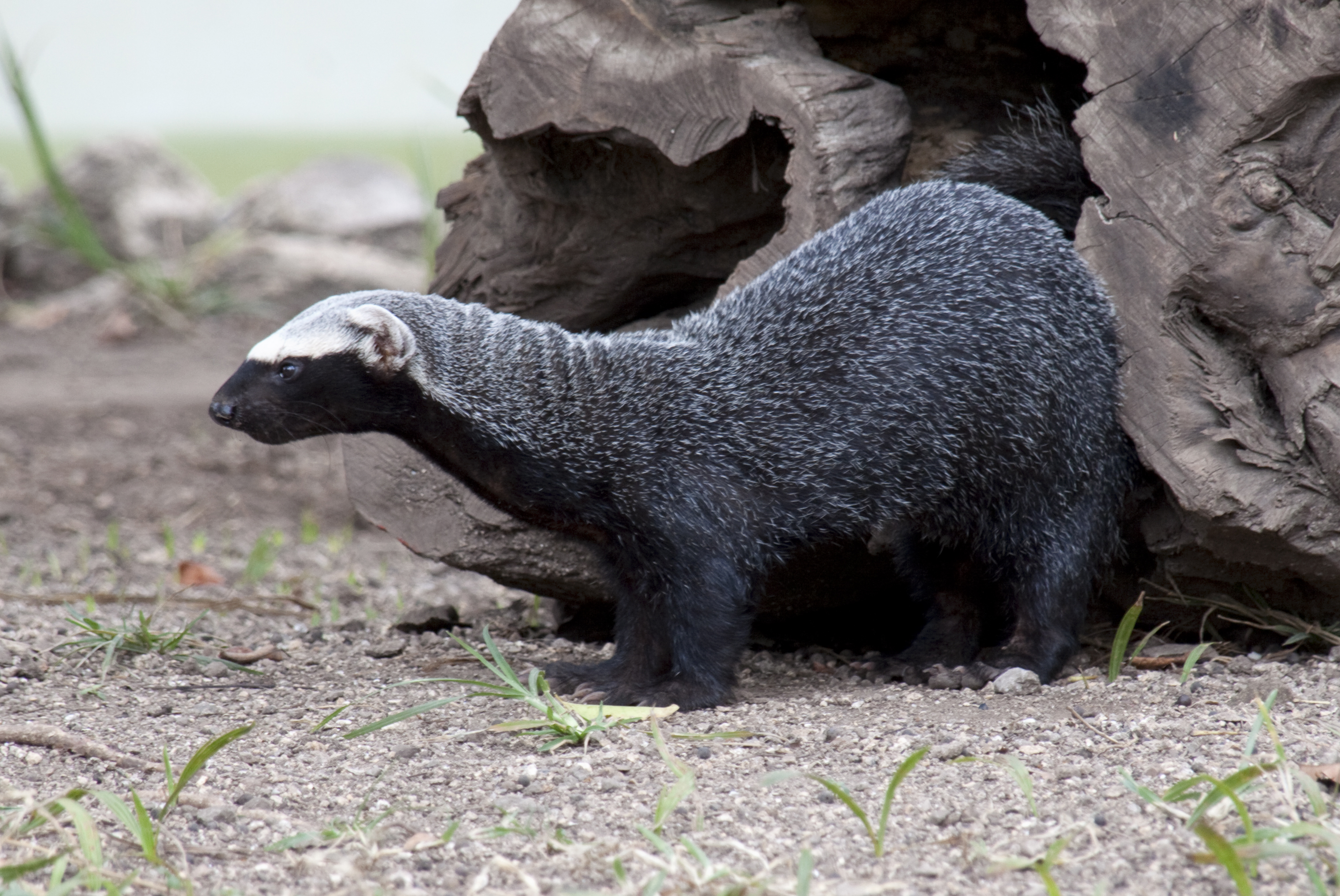
Greater grison

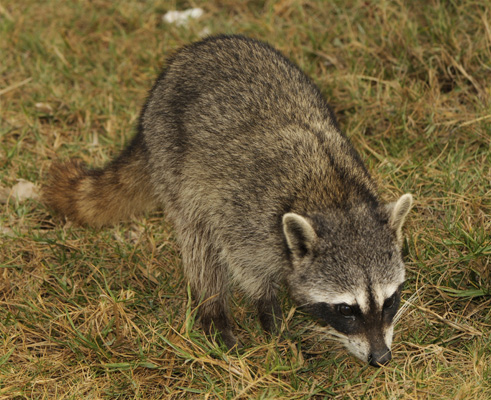
Cozumel raccoon

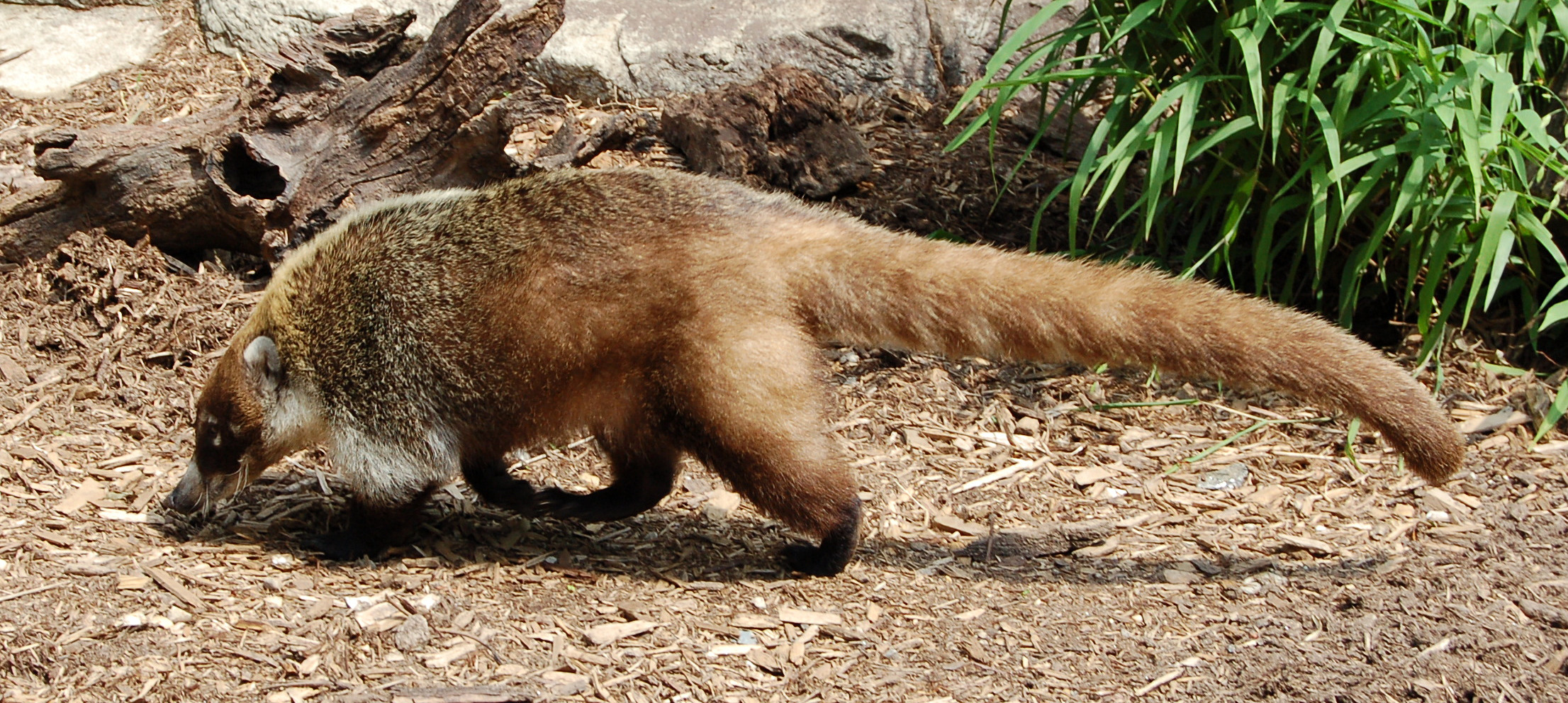
White-nosed coati

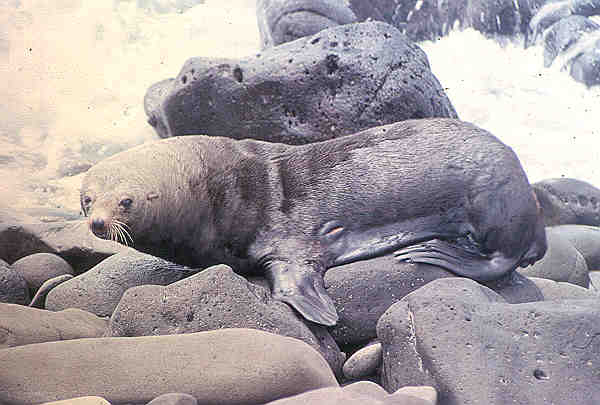
Guadalupe fur seal

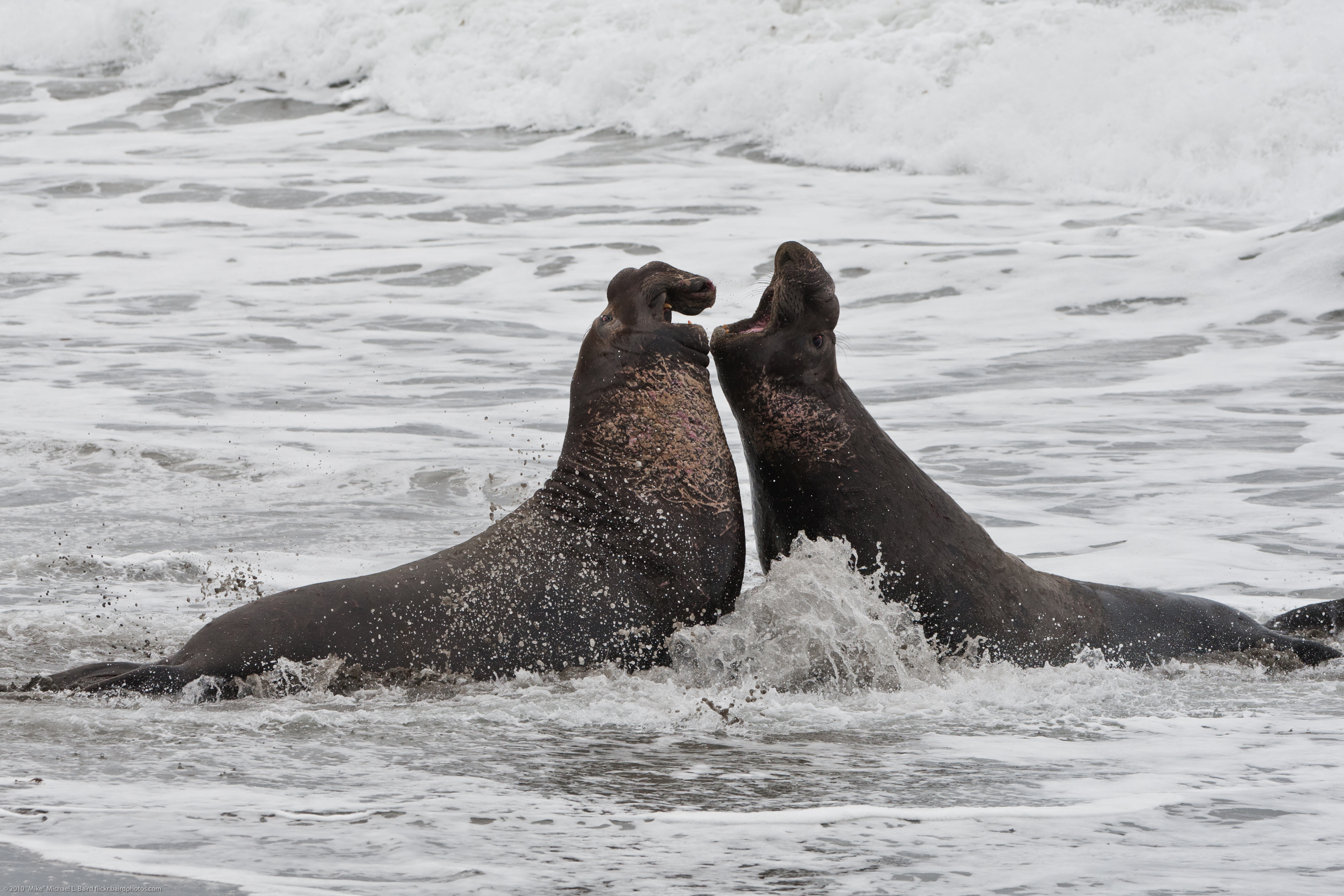
Northern elephant seal

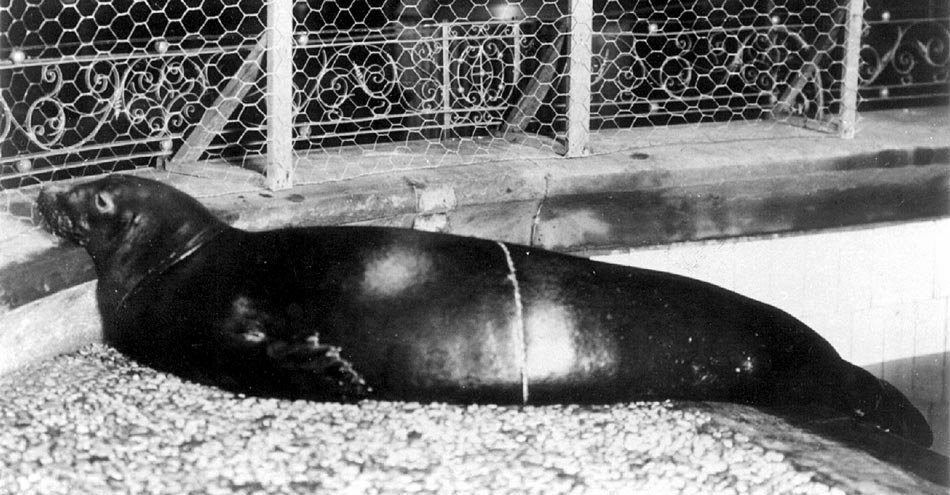
Caribbean monk seal

There are over 260 species of carnivorans, the majority of which feed primarily on meat. They have a characteristic skull shape and dentition. Mexico has more native mephitids than any other country, with two thirds of extant species being present. Only Costa Rica and Panama have more procyonid species (one more) than Mexico (it is tied with Colombia in this respect). Large extinct carnivorans that lived in the area prior to the coming of humans include the saber-toothed cat Smilodon fatalis, the scimitar cat Homotherium serum, American lions, American cheetahs, dire wolves and short-faced bears.

- Suborder: Feliformia
  - Family: Felidae (cats)
    - Subfamily: Felinae
      - Genus: Herpailurus
        - Jaguarundi, H. yagouaroundi LC
      - Genus: Leopardus
        - Ocelot, L. pardalis LC
        - Margay, L. wiedii NT
      - Genus: Lynx
        - Bobcat, L. rufus LC
      - Genus: Puma
        - Cougar, P. concolor LC
    - Subfamily: Pantherinae
      - Genus: Panthera
        - Jaguar, P. onca NT
- Suborder: Caniformia
  - Family: Canidae (dogs, foxes)
    - Genus: Canis
      - Coyote, C. latrans LC
      - Gray wolf, C. lupus LC reintroduced
        - Mexican wolf, C. l. baileyi reintroduced
    - Genus: Urocyon
      - Gray fox, U. cinereoargenteus LC
    - Genus: Vulpes
      - Kit fox, V. macrotis LC
      - Red fox, V. vulpes LC
  - Family: Ursidae (bears)
    - Genus: Ursus
      - American black bear, U. americanus LC
      - Brown bear, U. arctos LC extirpated
        - Mexican grizzly bear, U. a. horribilis EX
  - Family: Mephitidae
    - Genus: Conepatus
      - American hog-nosed skunk, C. leuconotus LC
      - Striped hog-nosed skunk, C. semistriatus LC
    - Genus: Mephitis
      - Hooded skunk, M. macroura LC
      - Striped skunk, M. mephitis LC
    - Genus: Spilogale
      - Southern spotted skunk, S. angustifrons LC
      - Western spotted skunk, S. gracilis LC
      - Eastern spotted skunk, S. putorius LC
      - Pygmy spotted skunk, S. pygmaea VU
  - Family: Mustelidae (mustelids)
    - Genus: Eira
      - Tayra, E. barbara LC
    - Genus: Enhydra
      - Sea otter, E. lutris EN
    - Genus: Galictis
      - Greater grison, G. vittata LC
    - Genus: Lontra
      - North American river otter, L. canadensis LC presence uncertain
      - Neotropical river otter, L. longicaudis NT
    - Genus: Mustela
      - Black-footed ferret, M. nigripes EN extirpated
    - Genus: Neogale
      - Long-tailed weasel, N. frenata LC
    - Genus: Taxidea
      - American badger, T. taxus LC
  - Family: Procyonidae (raccoons)
    - Genus: Bassariscus
      - Ringtail, B. astutus LC
      - Cacomistle, B. sumichrasti LC
    - Genus: Nasua
      - White-nosed coati, N. narica LC
        - Cozumel Island coati, N. n. nelsoni
    - Genus: Potos
      - Kinkajou, P. flavus LC
    - Genus: Procyon
      - Common raccoon, P. lotor LC
        - Tres Marias raccoon, P. l. insularis
      - Cozumel raccoon, P. pygmaeus CR
  - Clade Pinnipedia (seals, sea lions and walruses)
    - Family: Otariidae (eared seals, sea lions)
      - Genus: Arctocephalus
        - Galápagos fur seal, A. galapagoensis EN vagrant
        - Guadalupe fur seal, A. townsendi LC
      - Genus: Callorhinus
        - Northern fur seal, C. ursinus VU
      - Genus: Zalophus
        - California sea lion, Z. californianus LC
    - Family: Phocidae (earless seals)
      - Genus: Mirounga
        - Northern elephant seal, M. angustirostris LC
        - Southern elephant seal, M. leonina LC vagrant
      - Genus: Neomonachus
        - Caribbean monk seal, N. tropicalis EX
      - Genus: Phoca
        - Harbor seal, P. vitulina LC

==== Order: Perissodactyla (odd-toed ungulates) ====
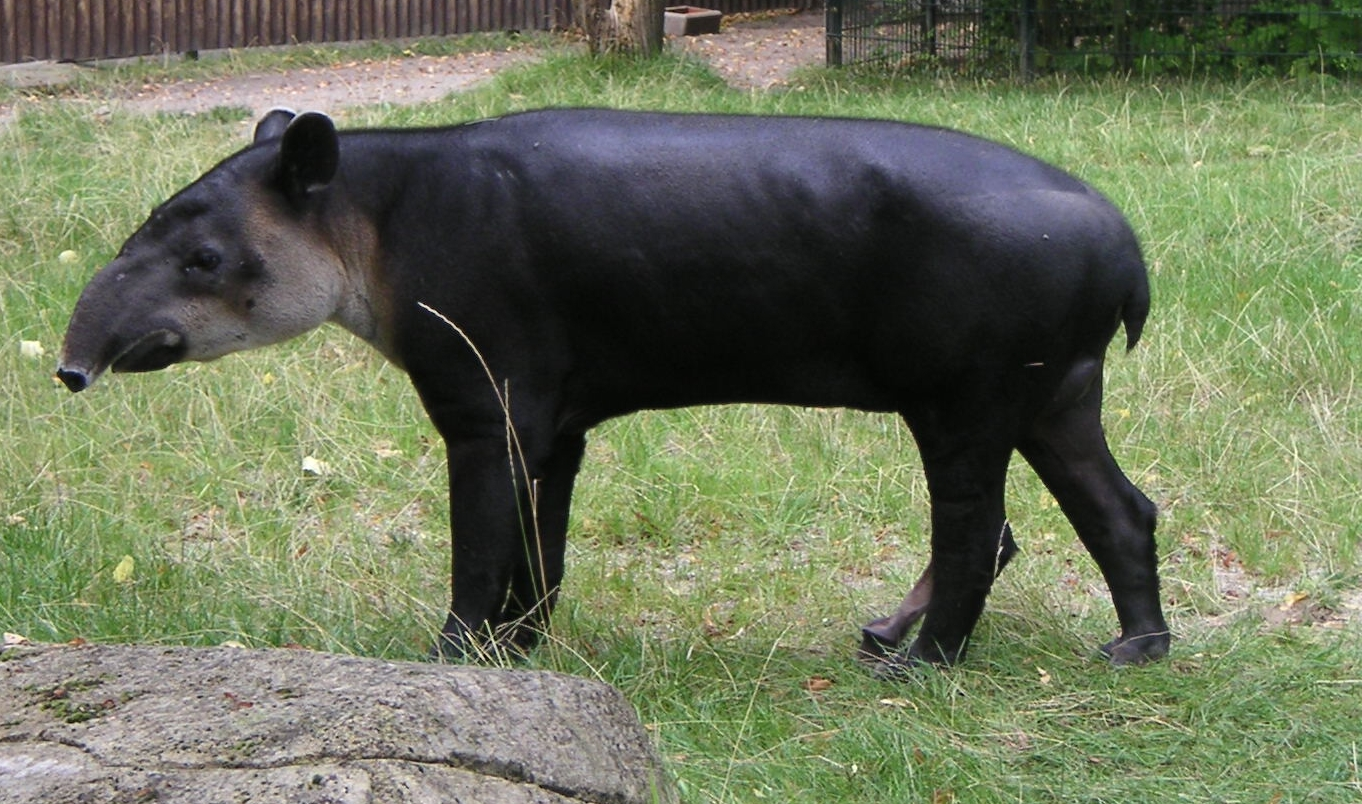
Baird's tapir

The odd-toed ungulates are browsing and grazing mammals. They are usually large to very large, and have relatively simple stomachs and a large middle toe. Tapirids were more widespread before humans appeared, formerly being present in temperate North America as well as the tropical regions they are found in today. Native equids once lived in the region, having evolved in North America over a period of 50 million years, but died out around the time of the first arrival of humans, along with at least one ungulate of South American origin, the notoungulate Mixotoxodon. Sequencing of collagen from a fossil of one recently extinct notoungulate has indicated that this order was closer to the perissodactyls than any extant mammal order.

- Family: Equidae
  - Genus: Equus
    - Wild horse, Equus ferus EN extirpated
      - Domestic horse, E. f. caballus introduced
- Family: Tapiridae (tapirs)
  - Genus: Tapirus
    - Baird's tapir, T. bairdii EN

==== Order: Artiodactyla (even-toed ungulates and cetaceans) ====
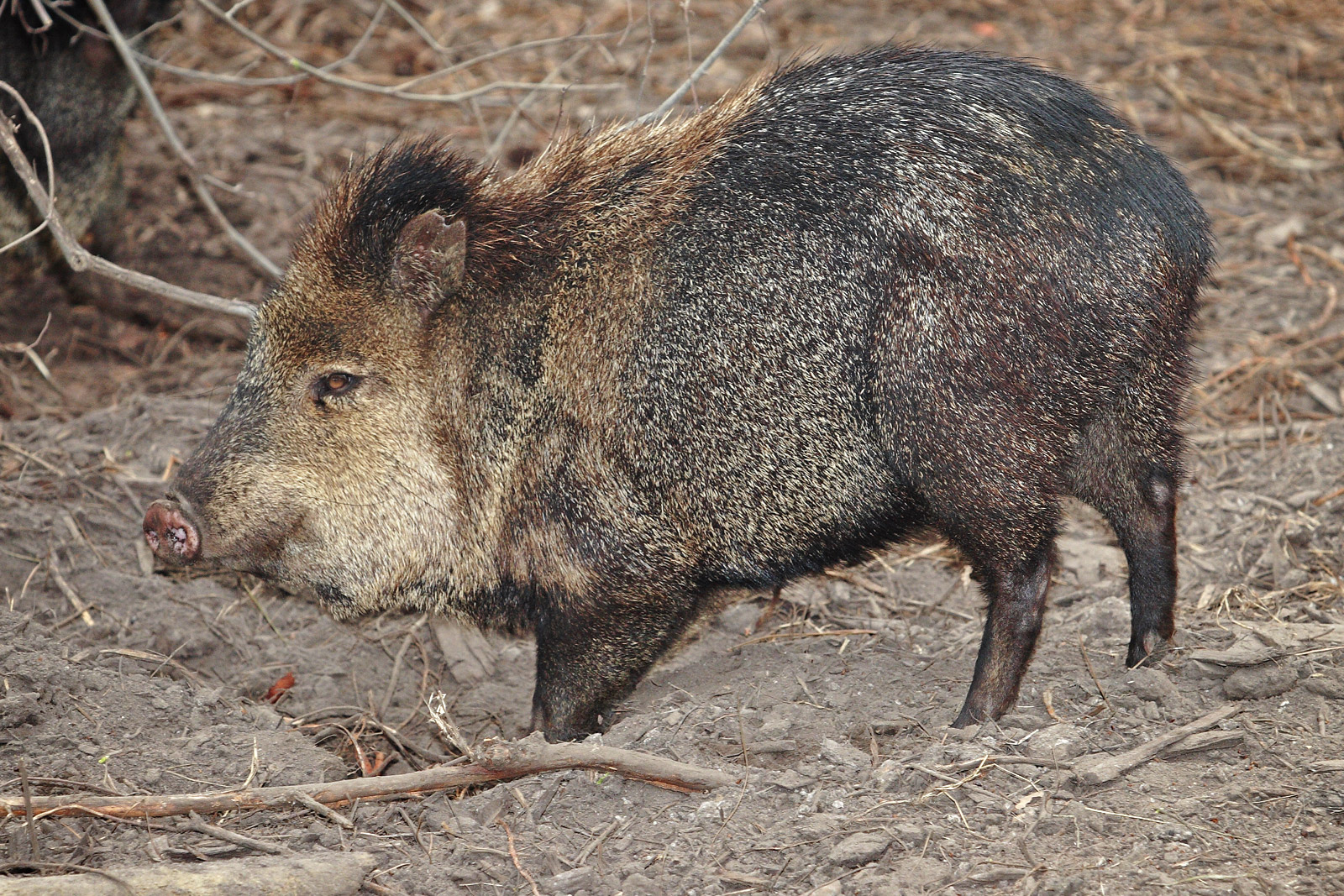
Collared peccary

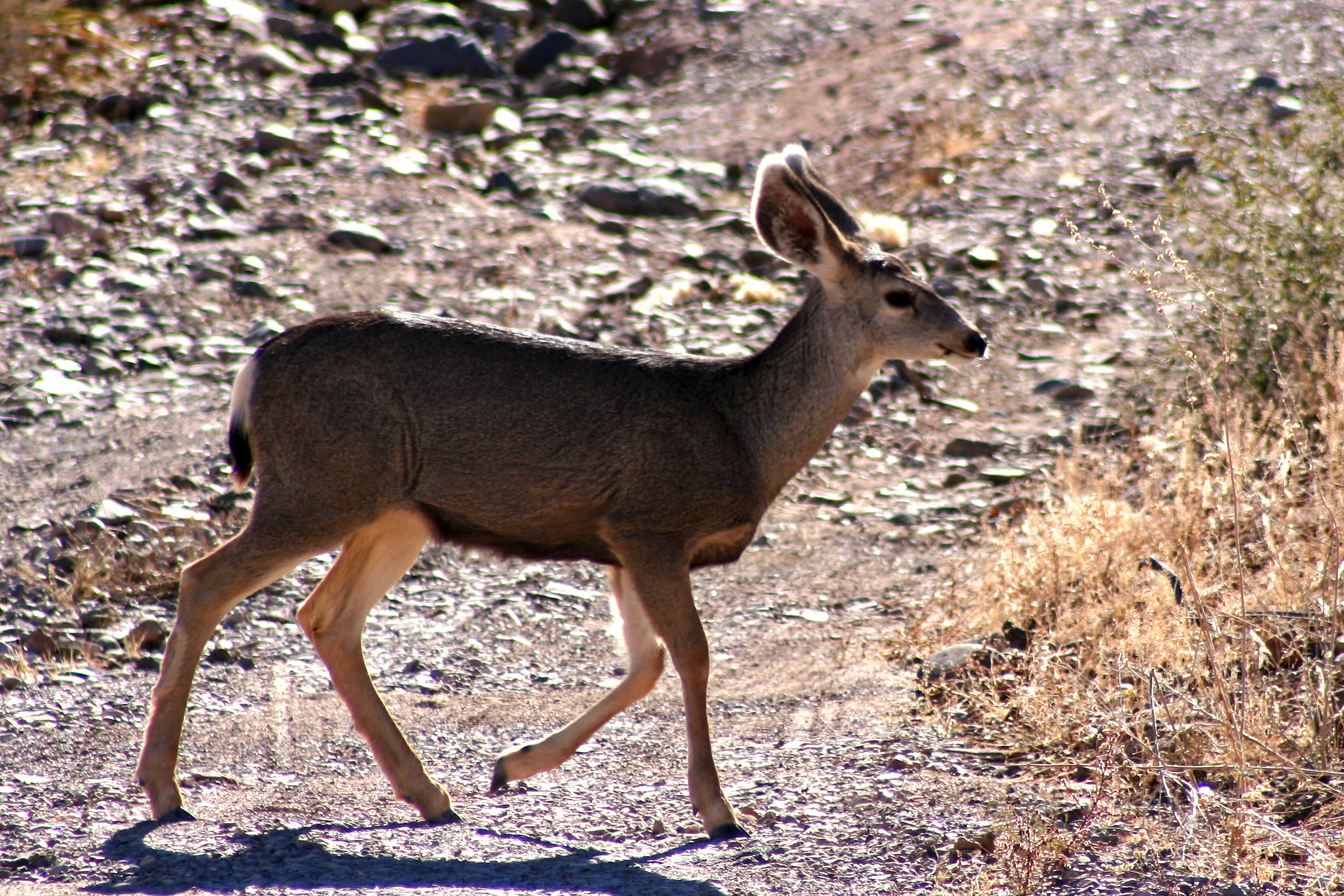
Mule deer

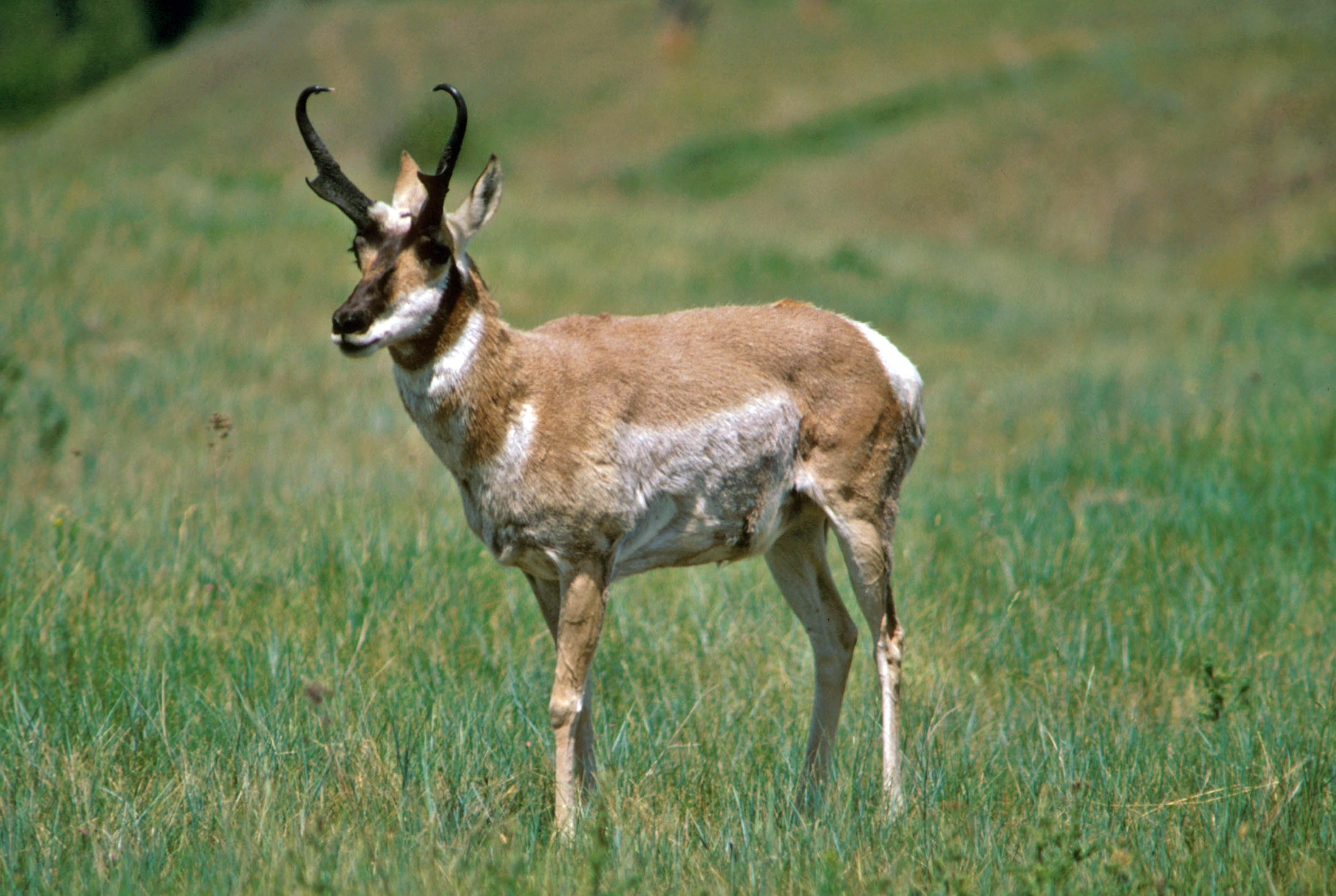
Pronghorn

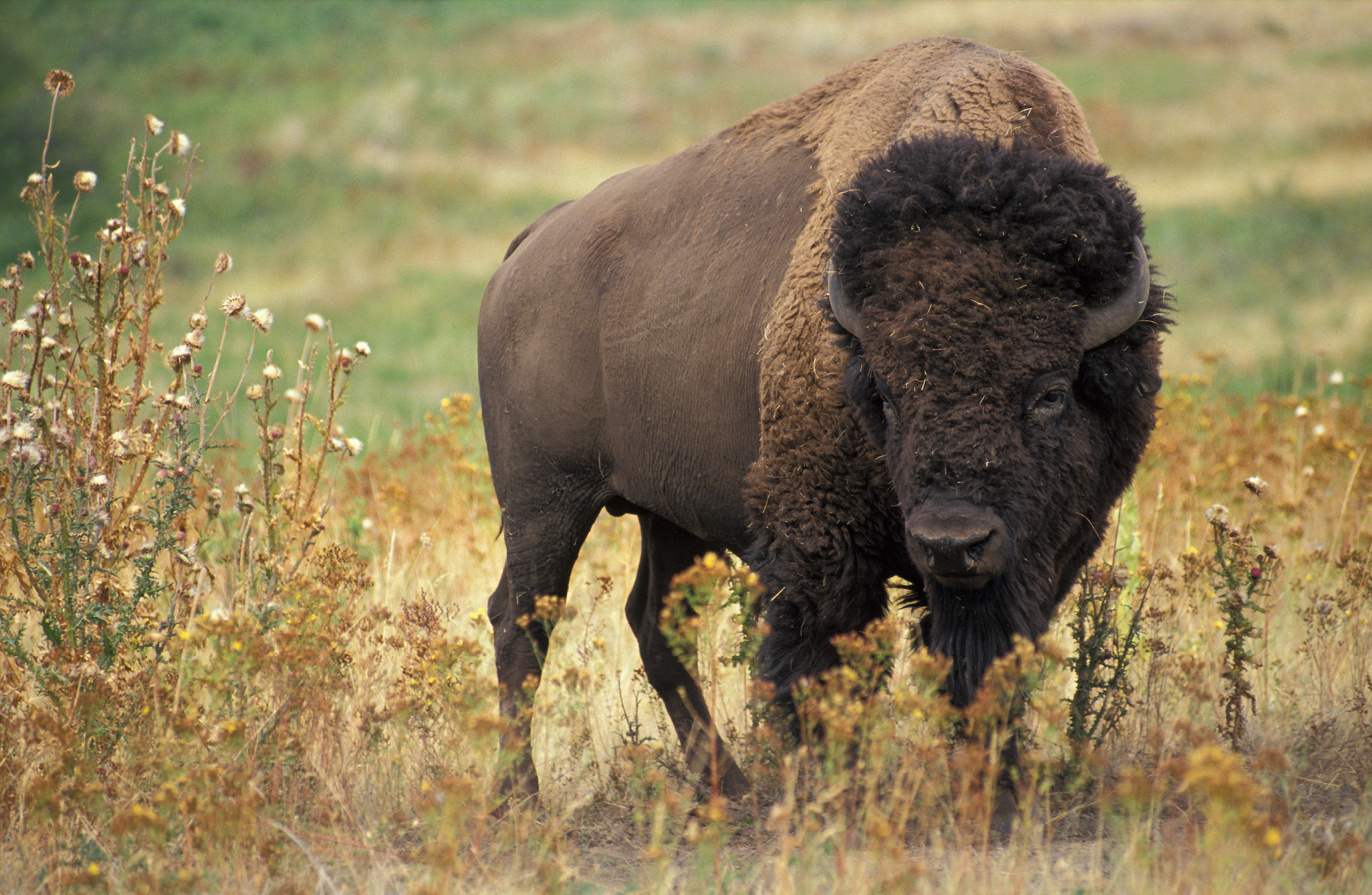
Plains bison

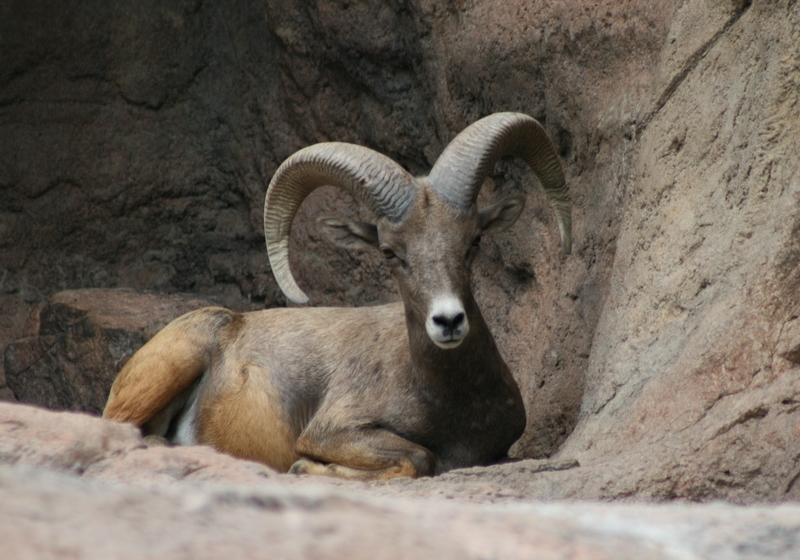
Desert bighorn sheep

The even-toed ungulates are ungulates whose weight is borne about equally by the third and fourth toes, rather than mostly or entirely by the third as in perissodactyls. There are about 220 noncetacean artiodactyl species, including many that are of great economic importance to humans. All of Mexico's extant ungulates are of Nearctic origin. Prior to the arrival of humans, camelids, which evolved in North America, also lived in the region, as did additional antilocaprids (e.g., Capromeryx minor).

- Family: Tayassuidae (peccaries)
  - Genus: Dicotyles
    - Collared peccary, D. tajacu LC
  - Genus: Tayassu
    - White-lipped peccary, T. pecari NT
- Family: Cervidae (deer)
  - Subfamily: Cervinae
    - Genus: Cervus
      - Elk, C. canadensis LC extirpated and reintroduced
        - Merriam's elk, C. c. merriami EX
  - Subfamily: Capreolinae
    - Genus: Mazama
      - Central American red brocket, M. temama DD
    - Genus: Odocoileus
      - Mule deer, O. hemionus LC
      - Yucatan brown brocket, O. pandora VU
      - White-tailed deer, O. virginianus LC
- Family: Antilocapridae (pronghorn)
  - Genus: Antilocapra
    - Pronghorn, A. americana LC reintroduced
      - Mexican pronghorn, A. a. mexicana EN
      - Baja California pronghorn, A. a. peninsularis CR
      - Sonoran pronghorn, A. a. sonoriensis EN
- Family: Bovidae (cattle, antelope, sheep, goats)
  - Subfamily: Bovinae
    - Genus: Bison
      - American bison, B. bison NT reintroduced
        - Plains bison, B. b. bison reintroduced
    - Genus: Boselaphus
      - Nilgai, B. tragocamelus LC introduced
  - Subfamily: Caprinae
    - Genus: Ovis
      - Bighorn sheep, O. canadensis LC
        - Desert bighorn sheep, O. c. nelsoni EN

==== Order: Cetacea (whales, dolphins and porpoises) ====
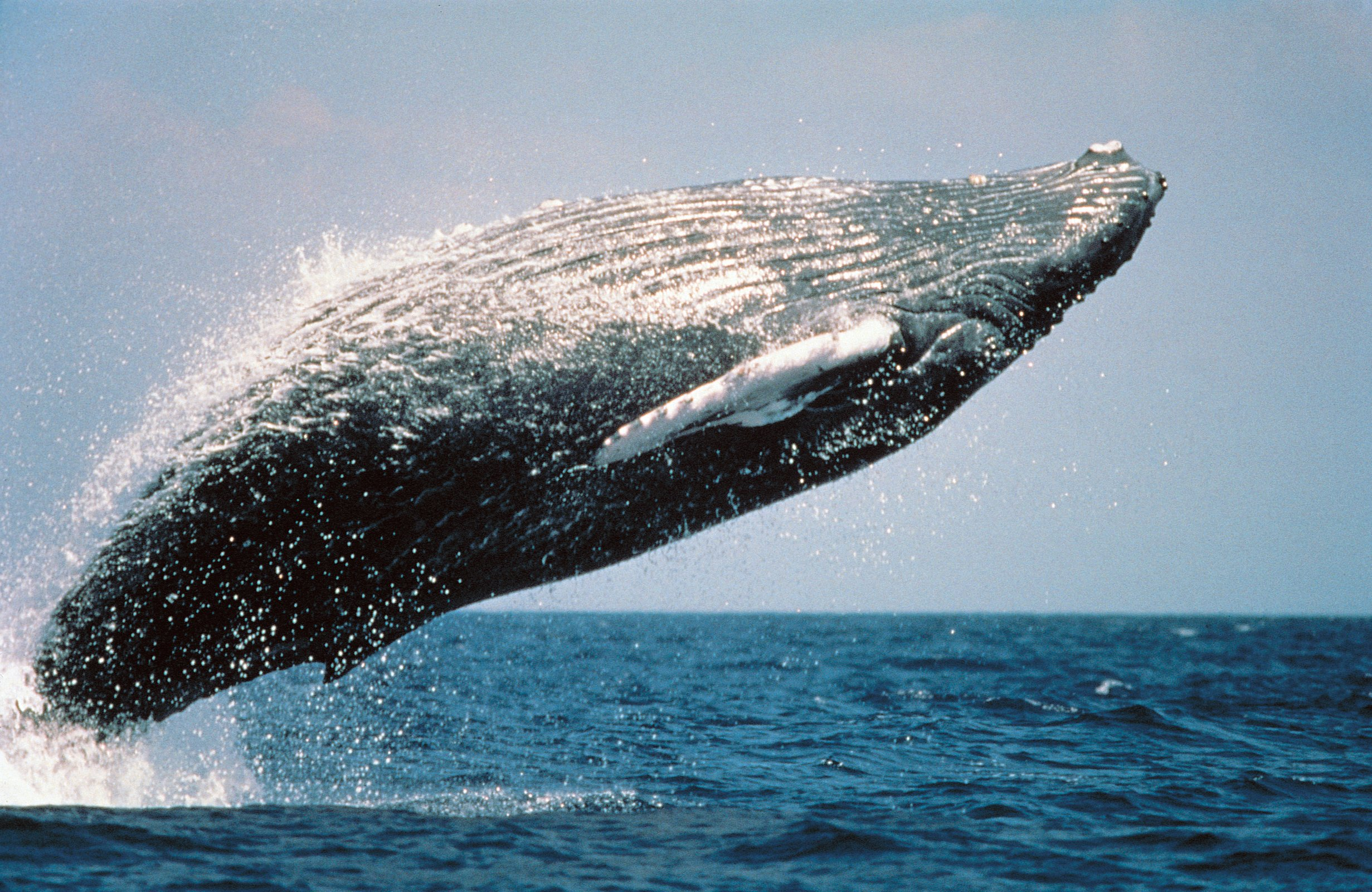
Humpback whale

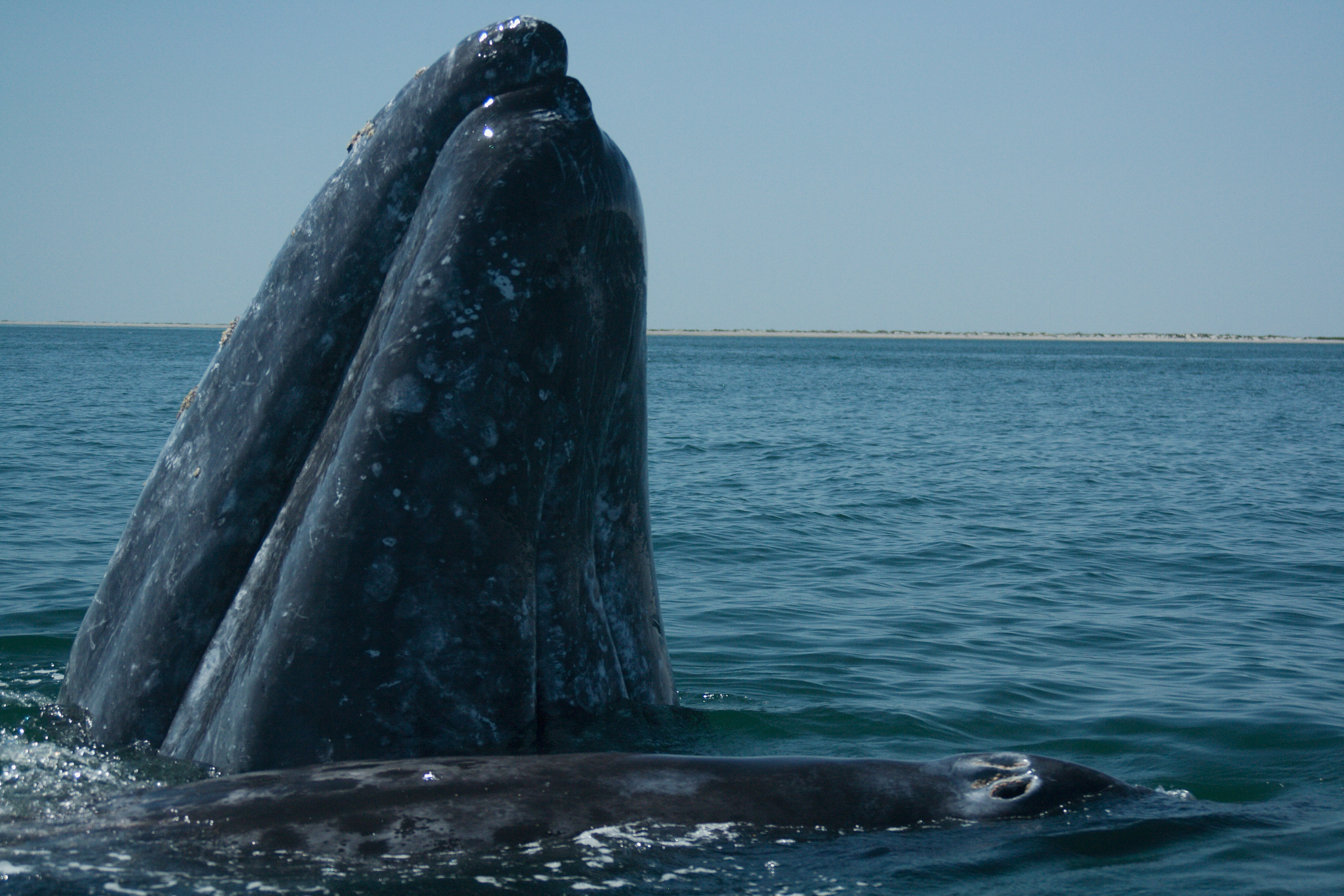
Gray whale

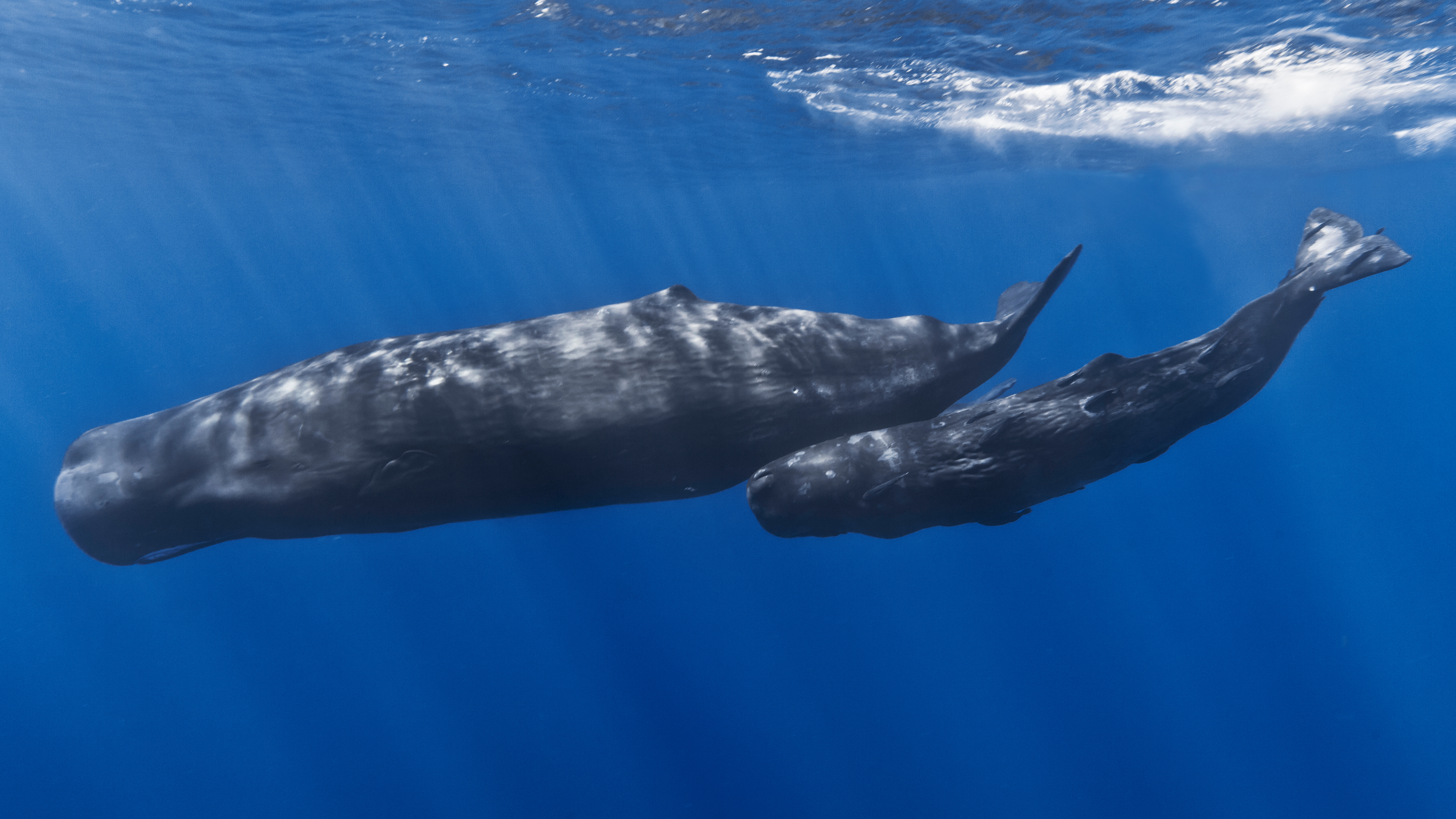
Sperm whales

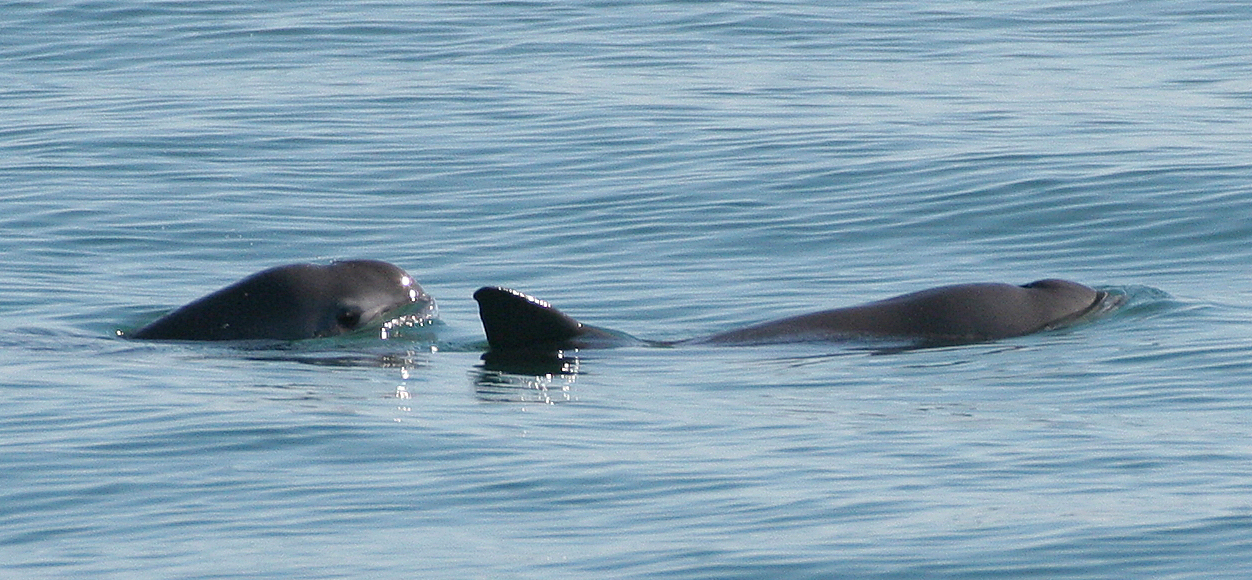
Vaquitas

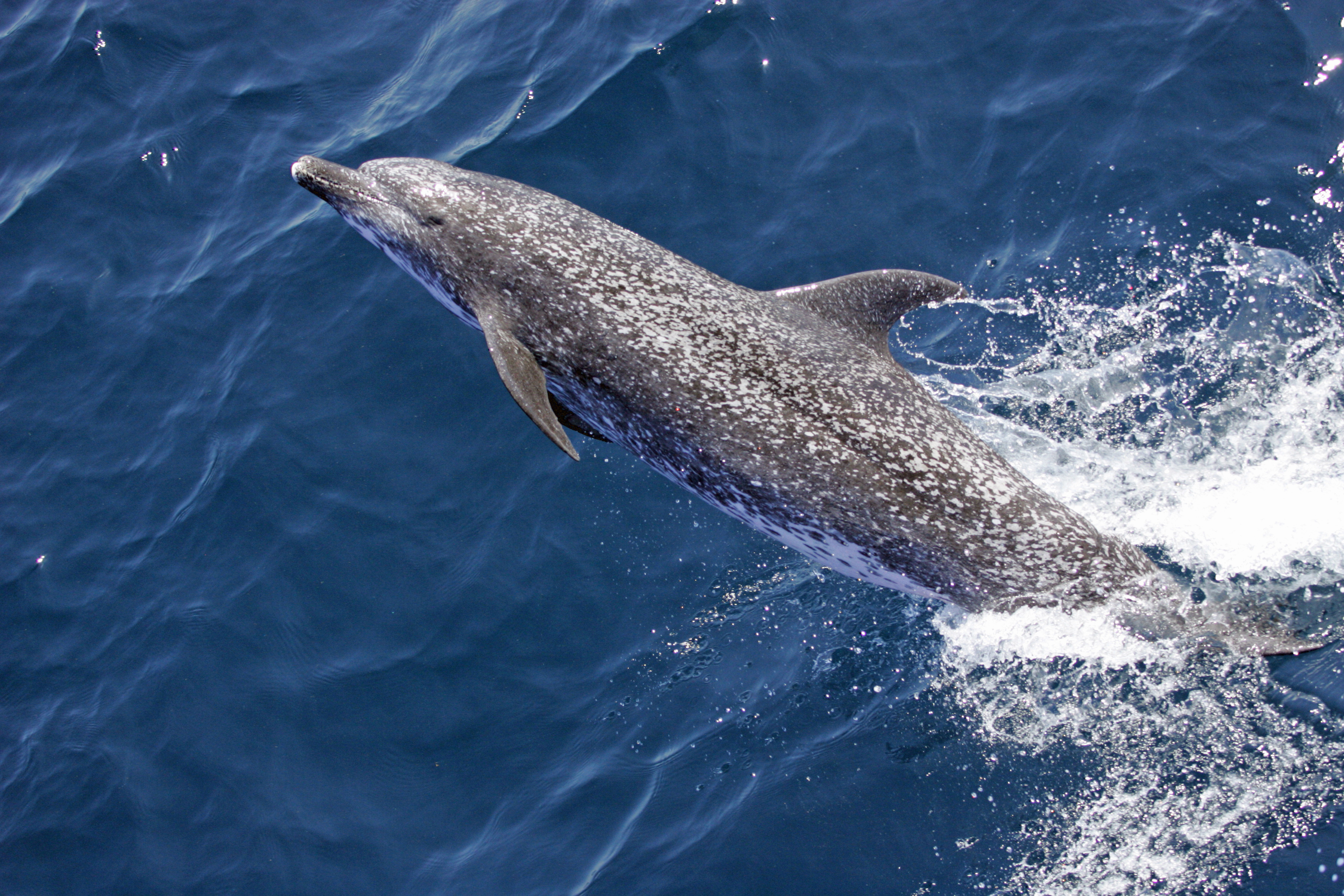
Atlantic spotted dolphin

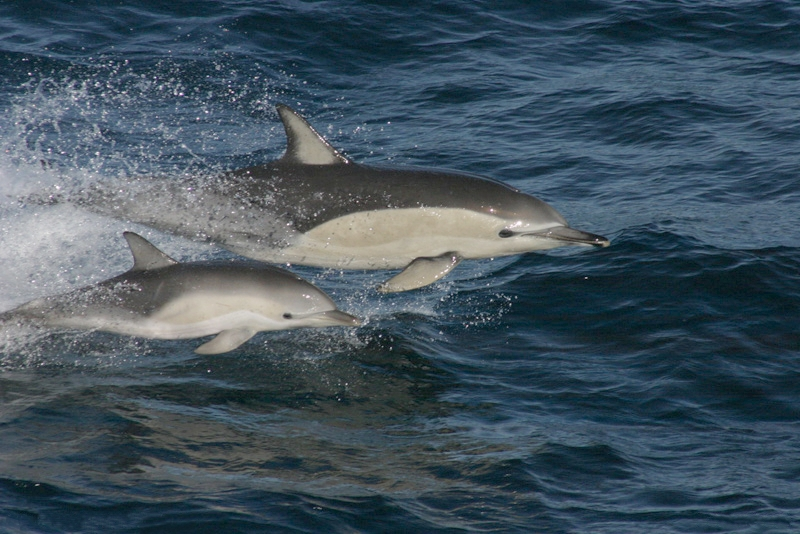
Short-beaked common dolphins

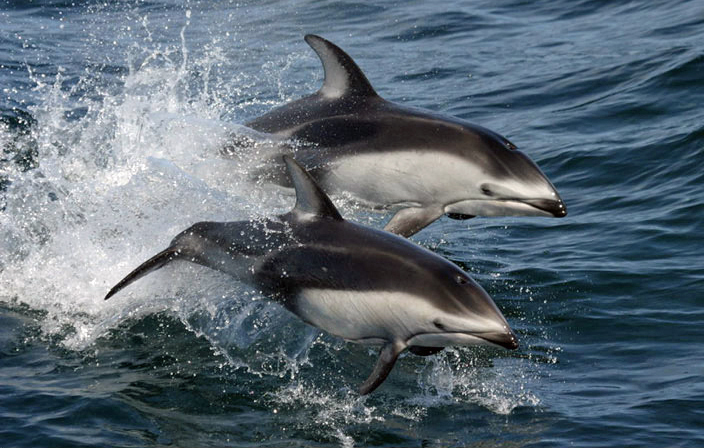
Pacific white-sided dolphins

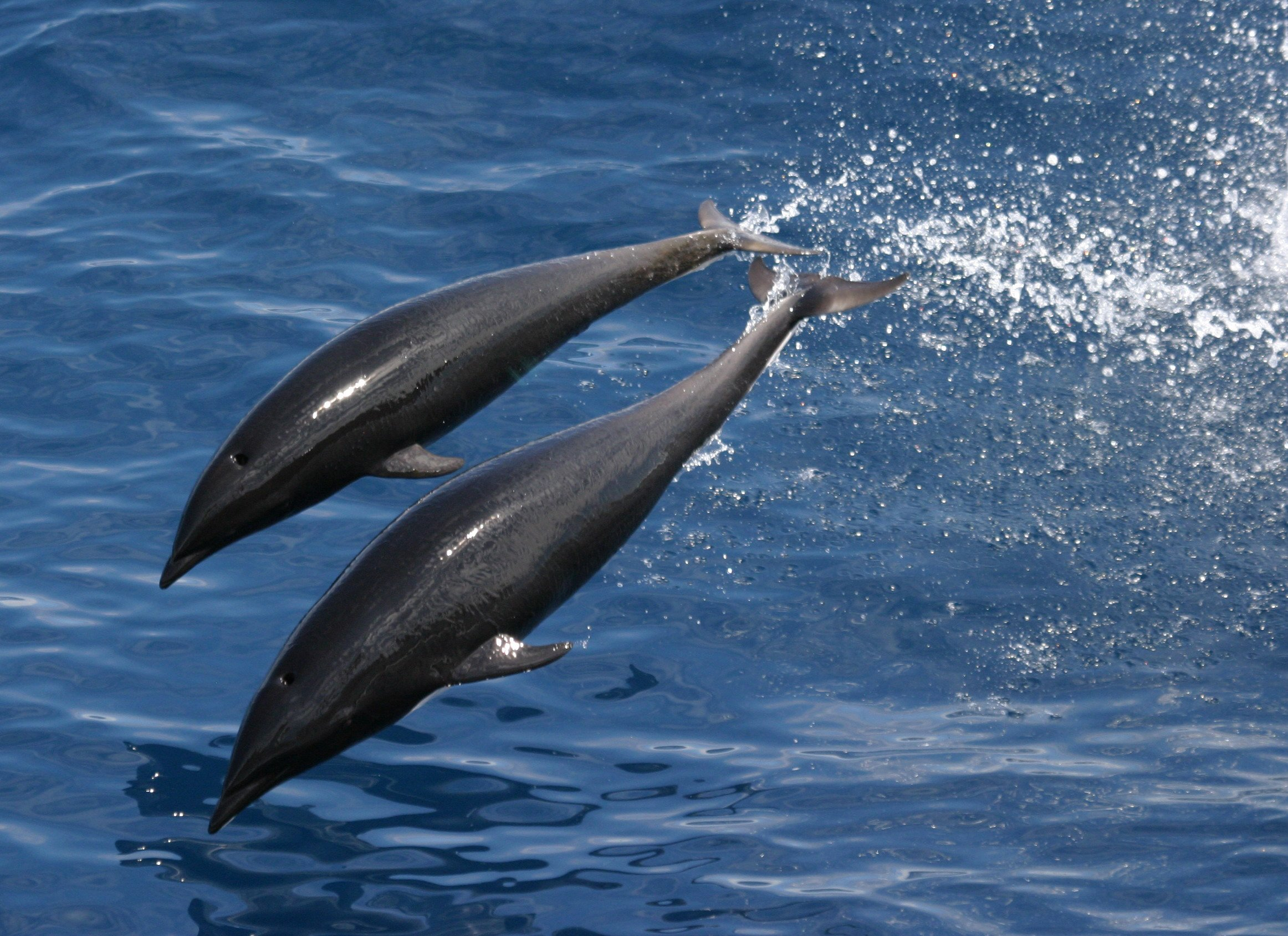
Northern right whale dolphins

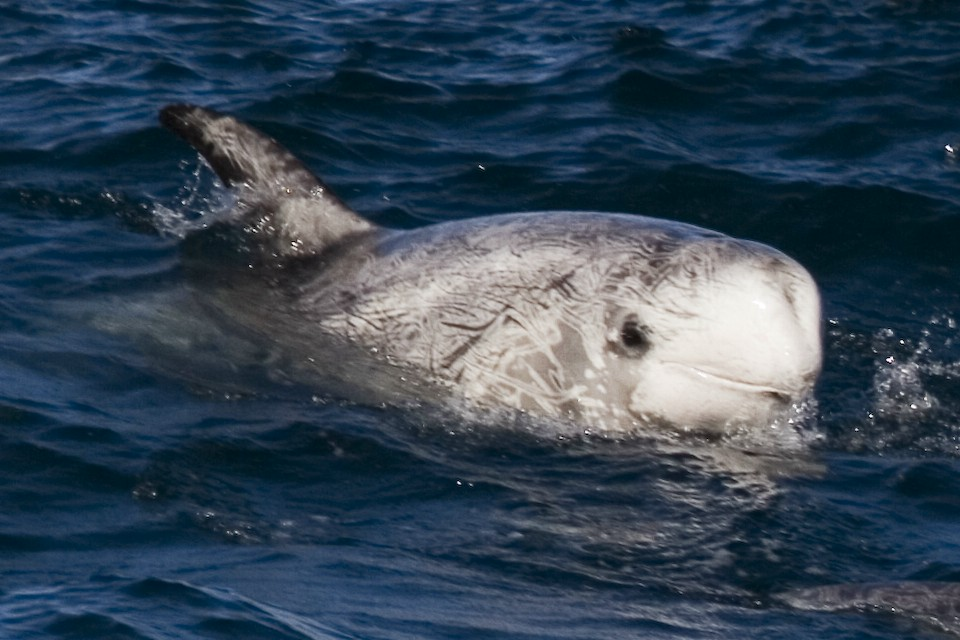
Risso's dolphin

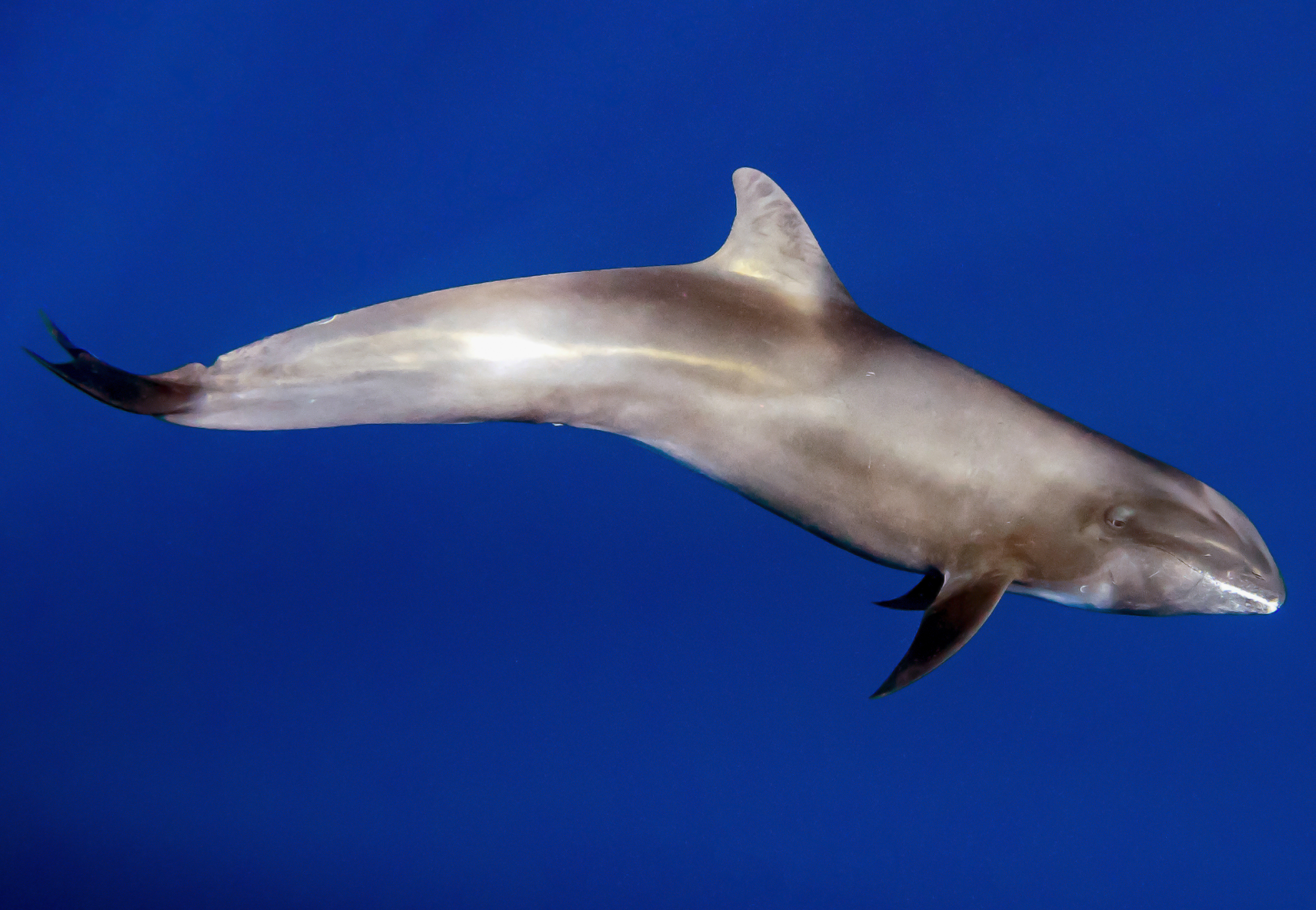
Melon-headed whale

Orcas

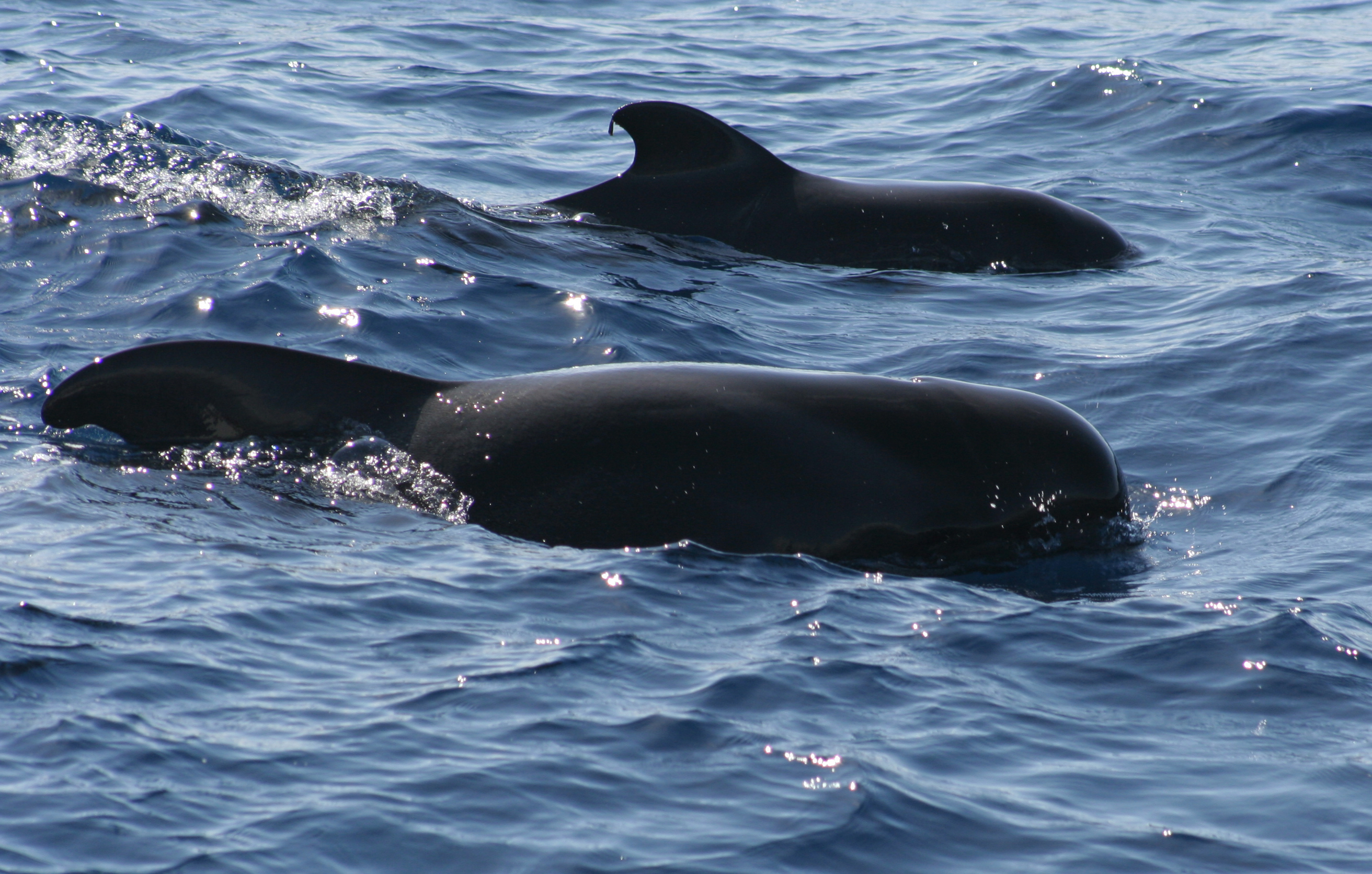
Short-finned pilot whales

The order Cetacea includes whales, dolphins and porpoises. They are the mammals most fully adapted to aquatic life with a spindle-shaped nearly hairless body, protected by a thick layer of blubber, and forelimbs and tail modified to provide propulsion underwater. Their closest extant relatives are the hippos, which are artiodactyls, from which cetaceans descended; cetaceans are thus also artiodactyls. Lagoons on the coast of Baja California Sur provide calving grounds for the eastern Pacific population of gray whales. The vaquita of the northern Gulf of California is the world's smallest and most endangered cetacean.

- Parvorder: Mysticeti
  - Family: Balaenopteridae
    - Subfamily: Balaenopterinae
      - Genus: Balaenoptera
        - Northern minke whale, Balaenoptera acutorostrata LC
        - Sei whale, Balaenoptera borealis EN
        - Bryde's whale, Balaenoptera edeni DD critically endangered population in Gulf of Mexico
        - Blue whale, Balaenoptera musculus EN
        - Fin whale, Balaenoptera physalus
          - Northern fin whale, B. p. physalus VU
    - Subfamily: Megapterinae
      - Genus: Megaptera
        - Humpback whale, Megaptera novaeangliae LC
  - Family: Eschrichtiidae
    - Genus: Eschrichtius
      - Gray whale, Eschrichtius robustus LC
  - Family: Balaenidae
    - Genus: Eubalaena
      - North Pacific right whale, Eubalaena japonica CR extremely rare
      - North Atlantic right whale, Eubalaena glacialis CR possibly seen historically
- Parvorder: Odontoceti
  - Family: Physeteridae (sperm whales)
    - Genus: Physeter
      - Sperm whale, Physeter macrocephalus VU
  - Family: Kogiidae
    - Genus: Kogia
      - Pygmy sperm whale, Kogia breviceps DD
      - Dwarf sperm whale, Kogia sima DD
  - Family: Ziphidae
    - Genus: Ziphius
      - Cuvier's beaked whale, Ziphius cavirostris LC
    - Genus: Berardius
      - Baird's beaked whale, Berardius bairdii DD
    - Subfamily: Hyperoodontinae
      - Genus: Indopacetus
        - Tropical bottlenose whale, Indopacetus pacificus DD
      - Genus: Mesoplodon
        - Blainville's beaked whale, Mesoplodon densirostris DD
        - Gervais' beaked whale, Mesoplodon europaeus DD
        - Ginkgo-toothed beaked whale, Mesoplodon ginkgodens DD
        - Pygmy beaked whale, Mesoplodon peruvianus DD
  - Superfamily: Delphinoidea
    - Family: Phocoenidae (porpoises)
      - Genus: Phocoena
        - Vaquita, P. sinus CR
      - Genus: Phocoenoides
        - Dall's porpoise, Phocoenoides dalli LC
    - Family: Delphinidae (marine dolphins)
      - Genus: Steno
        - Rough-toothed dolphin, Steno bredanensis LC
      - Genus: Tursiops
        - Bottlenose dolphin, Tursiops truncatus LC
      - Genus: Stenella
        - Pantropical spotted dolphin, Stenella attenuata LC
        - Clymene dolphin, Stenella clymene DD
        - Striped dolphin, Stenella coeruleoalba LC
        - Atlantic spotted dolphin, Stenella frontalis DD
        - Spinner dolphin, Stenella longirostris DD
      - Genus: Delphinus
        - Long-beaked common dolphin, Delphinus capensis DD
        - Short-beaked common dolphin, Delphinus delphis LC
      - Genus: Lagenodelphis
        - Fraser's dolphin, Lagenodelphis hosei LC
      - Genus: Lissodelphis
        - Northern right whale dolphin, Lissodelphis borealis LC
      - Genus: Sagmatias
        - Pacific white-sided dolphin, Sagmatias obliquidens LC
      - Genus: Grampus
        - Risso's dolphin, Grampus griseus LC
      - Genus: Peponocephala
        - Melon-headed whale, Peponocephala electra LC
      - Genus: Feresa
        - Pygmy killer whale, Feresa attenuata DD
      - Genus: Pseudorca
        - False killer whale, Pseudorca crassidens DD
      - Genus: Orcinus
        - Orca, Orcinus orca DD
      - Genus: Globicephala
        - Short-finned pilot whale, Globicephala macrorhynchus DD

== See also ==
- List of mammals of North America
- List of prehistoric mammals
- Lists of mammals by region
- Mammal classification
- List of mammals described in the 2000s
