= List of heteromyids =

Species in mammal family Heteromyidae

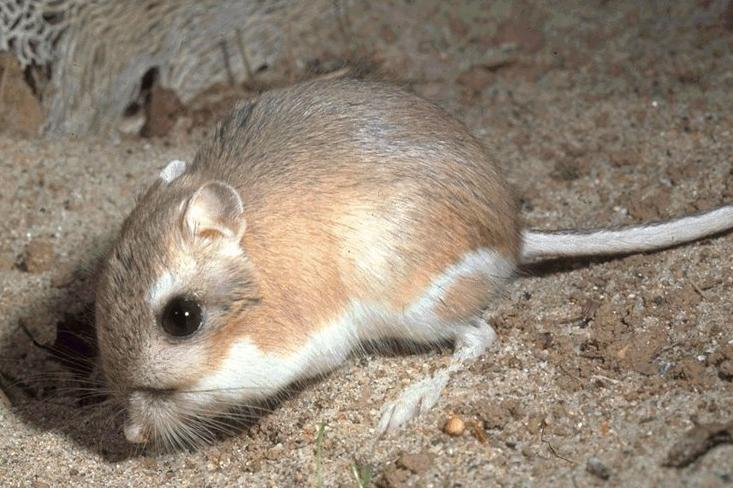
Ord's kangaroo rat (Dipodomys ordii)

Heteromyidae is a family of small mammals in the order Rodentia and part of the Castorimorpha suborder. Members of this family are called heteromyids and include kangaroo rats, kangaroo mice, pocket mice, and spiny pocket mice. They are found in North America, Central America, and the northwest tip of South America, primarily in forests, shrublands, and deserts, though some species can be found in grasslands or rocky areas. They range in size from Merriam's pocket mouse, at 5 cm (2 in) plus a 4 cm (2 in) tail, to Nelson's spiny pocket mouse, at 17 cm (7 in) plus a 20 cm (8 in) tail. Heteromyids are omnivores and primarily eat seeds, leaves, and other vegetation, as well as grain and insects. Almost no heteromyids have population estimates, though four species—the giant kangaroo rat, Jaliscan spiny pocket mouse, Nelson's spiny pocket mouse, and Paraguaná spiny pocket mouse—are categorized as endangered species, while the San Quintin kangaroo rat is categorized as critically endangered with a population of fewer than fifty mature adults.

The sixty-three extant species of Heteromyidae are divided into three subfamilies: Dipodomyinae, containing twenty–two species of kangaroo rats and kangaroo mice in two genera; Heteromyinae, containing a single genus of fourteen spiny pocket mouse species; and Perognathinae, containing twenty-seven pocket mouse species in two genera. A few extinct prehistoric heteromyid species have been discovered, though due to ongoing research and discoveries, the exact number and categorization is not fixed.

== Conventions ==
IUCN Red List categories
Conservation status
- EX: Extinct (0 species)
- EW: Extinct in the wild (0 species)
- CR: Critically endangered (1 species)
- EN: Endangered (4 species)
- VU: Vulnerable (5 species)
- NT: Near threatened (3 species)
- LC: Least concern (49 species)

Other categories
- DD: Data deficient (1 species)
- NE: Not evaluated (0 species)

The author citation for the species or genus is given after the scientific name; parentheses around the author citation indicate that this was not the original taxonomic placement. Conservation status codes listed follow the International Union for Conservation of Nature (IUCN) Red List of Threatened Species. Range maps are provided wherever possible; if a range map is not available, a description of the heteromyid's range is provided. Ranges are based on the IUCN Red List for that species unless otherwise noted.

== Classification ==
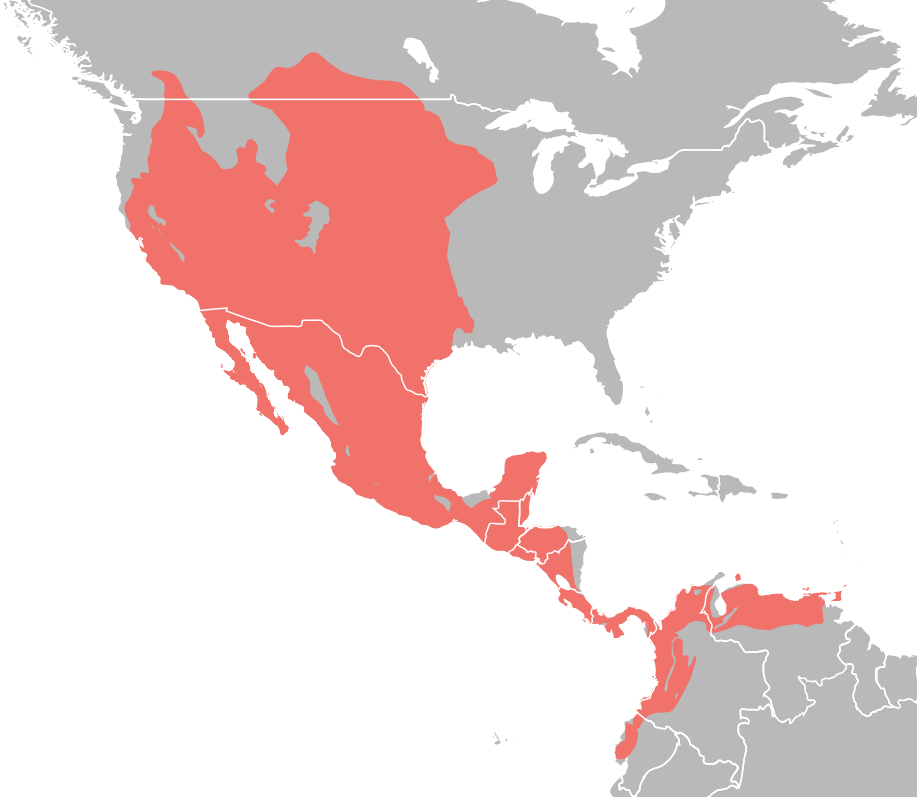
Heteromyidae distribution

Heteromyidae is a family consisting of sixty-three extant species in five genera. These genera are divided between three subfamilies: Dipodomyinae, containing the kangaroo rats and kangaroo mice; Heteromyinae, or the spiny pocket mice; and Perognathinae, or the pocket mice.

Family Heteromyidae

- Subfamily Dipodomyinae
  - Genus Dipodomys (kangaroo rats): twenty species
  - Genus Microdipodops (kangaroo mice): two species
- Subfamily Heteromyinae
  - Genus Heteromys (spiny pocket mice): fourteen species
- Subfamily Perognathinae
  - Genus Chaetodipus (coarse-haired pocket mice): eighteen species
  - Genus Perognathus (silky pocket mice): nine species

- Heteromyidae
  - - Dipodomyinae
      - Dipodomys
      - Microdipodops
  - - Heteromyinae
      Heteromys
    - Perognathinae
      - Perognathus
      - Chaetodipus

== Heteromyids ==
The following classification is based on the taxonomy described by the reference work Mammal Species of the World (2005), with augmentation by generally accepted proposals made since using molecular phylogenetic analysis, as supported by both the IUCN and the American Society of Mammalogists.

=== Subfamily Dipodomyinae ===
Genus Dipodomys – Gray, 1841 – 20 species
Common name	Scientific name and subspecies	Range	Size and ecology	IUCN status and estimated population
Agile kangaroo rat	D. agilis Gambel, 1848 Two subspecies: D. a. agilis; D. a. perplexus	Western United States	Size: 10–13 cm (4–5 in) long, plus 17–20 cm (7–8 in) tail Habitat: Forest and shrubland Diet: Seeds, as well as fruit, leaves, stems, buds, and insects	LC Unknown
Banner-tailed kangaroo rat	D. spectabilis Merriam, 1890 Six subspecies: D. s. baileyi; D. s. cratodon; D. s. intermedius; D. s. perblandus; D. s. spectabilis; D. s. zygomaticus	Southern United States and Mexico	Size: 13–15 cm (5–6 in) long, plus 18–21 cm (7–8 in) tail Habitat: Desert Diet: Seeds, as well as fruit, leaves, stems, buds, and insects	NT Unknown
California kangaroo rat	D. californicus Merriam, 1890 Three subspecies: D. c. californicus; D. c. eximius; D. c. saxatilis	Western United States	Size: 10–13 cm (4–5 in) long, plus 15–22 cm (6–9 in) tail Habitat: Forest, shrubland, and grassland Diet: Seeds, as well as fruit, leaves, stems, buds, and insects	LC Unknown
Chisel-toothed kangaroo rat	D. microps (Merriam, 1904) Thirteen subspecies: D. m. alfredi; D. m. aquilonius; D. m. bonnevillei; D. m. celsus; D. m. centralis; D. m. idahoensis; D. m. leucotis; D. m. levipes; D. m. microps; D. m. occidentalis; D. m. preblei; D. m. russeolus; D. m. subtenuis	Western United States	Size: 11–12 cm (4–5 in) long, plus 13–18 cm (5–7 in) tail Habitat: Shrubland, rocky areas, and desert Diet: Seeds, as well as fruit, leaves, stems, buds, and insects	LC Unknown
Desert kangaroo rat	D. deserti Stephens, 1887 Four subspecies: D. d. aquilus; D. d. arizonae; D. d. deserti; D. d. sonoriensis	Western United States and western Mexico	Size: 13–16 cm (5–6 in) long, plus 19–21 cm (7–8 in) tail Habitat: Desert Diet: Seeds, as well as fruit, leaves, stems, buds, and insects	LC Unknown
Dulzura kangaroo rat	D. simulans (Merriam, 1904) Two subspecies: D. s. peninsularis; D. s. simulans	Western United States and western Mexico	Size: 11–13 cm (4–5 in) long, plus 16–19 cm (6–7 in) tail Habitat: Forest, shrubland, grassland, and desert Diet: Seeds, as well as fruit, leaves, stems, buds, and insects	LC Unknown
Fresno kangaroo rat	D. nitratoides Merriam, 1894 Three subspecies: D. n. brevinasus; D. n. exilis; D. n. nitratoides (Tipton kangaroo rat)	Western United States	Size: 7–12 cm (3–5 in) long, plus 13–15 cm (5–6 in) tail Habitat: Shrubland, grassland, and desert Diet: Seeds, as well as fruit, leaves, stems, buds, and insects	VU Unknown
Giant kangaroo rat	D. ingens (Merriam, 1904)	Western United States	Size: 13–15 cm (5–6 in) long, plus 17–20 cm (7–8 in) tail Habitat: Savanna and grassland Diet: Seeds, as well as fruit, leaves, stems, buds, and insects	EN Unknown
Gulf Coast kangaroo rat	D. compactus True, 1889 Two subspecies: D. c. compactus; D. c. sennetti	Southern United States	Size: 9–12 cm (4–5 in) long, plus 10–14 cm (4–6 in) tail Habitat: Savanna, shrubland, grassland, and coastal marine Diet: Seeds, as well as fruit, leaves, stems, buds, and insects	LC Unknown
Heermann's kangaroo rat	D. heermanni Conte, 1853 Nine subspecies: D. h. arenae; D. h. berkeleyensis; D. h. dixoni; D. h. goldmani; D. h. heermanni; D. h. jolonensis; D. h. morroensis (Morro Bay kangaroo rat); D. h. swarthi; D. h. tularensis	Western United States	Size: 9–12 cm (4–5 in) long, plus 16–20 cm (6–8 in) tail Habitat: Forest, savanna, shrubland, grassland, and desert Diet: Seeds, as well as fruit, leaves, stems, buds, and insects	LC Unknown
Merriam's kangaroo rat	D. merriami Mearns, 1890 Nineteen subspecies: D. m. ambiguus; D. m. annulus; D. m. arenivagus; D. m. atronasus; D. m. brunensis; D. m. collinus; D. m. frenatus; D. m. insularis; D. m. margaritae; D. m. mayensis; D. m. melanurus; D. m. merriami; D. m. mitchelli; D. m. olivaceus; D. m. parvus (San Bernardino kangaroo rat); D. m. platycephalus; D. m. quintinensis; D. m. trinidadensis; D. m. vulcani	Southwestern United States and Mexico	Size: 7–10 cm (3–4 in) long, plus 12–19 cm (5–7 in) tail Habitat: Shrubland and desert Diet: Seeds, as well as fruit, leaves, stems, buds, and insects	LC Unknown
Narrow-faced kangaroo rat	D. venustus (Merriam, 1904) Three subspecies: D. v. elephantinus; D. v. sanctiluciae; D. v. venustus	Western United States	Size: 11–13 cm (4–5 in) long, plus 17–20 cm (7–8 in) tail Habitat: Forest and shrubland Diet: Seeds, as well as fruit, leaves, stems, buds, and insects	LC Unknown
Nelson's kangaroo rat	D. nelsoni Merriam, 1907	Northern Mexico	Size: 12–14 cm (5–6 in) long, plus 12–20 cm (5–8 in) tail Habitat: Shrubland and desert Diet: Seeds, as well as fruit, leaves, stems, buds, and insects	LC Unknown
Ord's kangaroo rat	D. ordii Woodhouse, 1853 32 subspecies: D. o. celeripes; D. o. chapmani; D. o. cinderensis; D. o. cineraceus; D. o. columbianus; D. o. cupidineus; D. o. durranti; D. o. evexus; D. o. extractus; D. o. fetosus; D. o. fremonti; D. o. inaquosus; D. o. longipes; D. o. luteolus; D. o. marshalli; D. o. medius; D. o. monoensis; D. o. montanus; D. o. nexilis; D. o. obscurus; D. o. oklahomae; D. o. ordii; D. o. pallidus; D. o. palmeri; D. o. panguitchensis; D. o. priscus; D. o. pullus; D. o. richardsoni; D. o. sanrafaeli; D. o. terrosus; D. o. uintensis; D. o. utahensis	Western North America	Size: 7–16 cm (3–6 in) long, plus about 13 cm (5 in) tail Habitat: Shrubland and grassland Diet: Seeds, as well as fruit, leaves, stems, buds, and insects	LC Unknown
Ornate kangaroo rat	D. ornatus Merriam, 1894	Central Mexico	Size: 10–11 cm (4 in) long, plus 15–20 cm (6–8 in) tail Habitat: Desert Diet: Seeds, as well as fruit, leaves, stems, buds, and insects	LC Unknown
Panamint kangaroo rat	D. panamintinus (Merriam, 1894) Five subspecies: D. p. argusensis; D. p. caudatus; D. p. leucogenys; D. p. mohavensis; D. p. panamintinus	Western United States	Size: About 12 cm (5 in) long, plus about 17 cm (7 in) tail Habitat: Savanna, shrubland, and desert Diet: Seeds, as well as fruit, leaves, stems, buds, and insects	LC Unknown
Phillips's kangaroo rat	D. phillipsii Gray, 1841 Four subspecies: D. p. oaxacae; D. p. ornatus; D. p. perotensis; D. p. phillipsii	Central Mexico	Size: 8–12 cm (3–5 in) long, plus 14–19 cm (6–7 in) tail Habitat: Shrubland and desert Diet: Seeds, as well as fruit, leaves, stems, buds, and insects	LC Unknown
San Quintin kangaroo rat	D. gravipes Huey, 1925	Western Mexico	Size: 12–14 cm (5–6 in) long, plus 16–18 cm (6–7 in) tail Habitat: Desert Diet: Seeds, as well as fruit, leaves, stems, buds, and insects	CR 5–50
Stephens's kangaroo rat	D. stephensi (Merriam, 1907)	Western United States	Size: 11–12 cm (4–5 in) long, plus 16–18 cm (6–7 in) tail Habitat: Grassland and shrubland Diet: Seeds, as well as fruit, leaves, stems, buds, and insects	VU Unknown
Texas kangaroo rat	D. elator Merriam, 1894	Southern United States	Size: 9–14 cm (4–6 in) long, plus 16–20 cm (6–8 in) tail Habitat: Savanna and desert Diet: Seeds, as well as fruit, leaves, stems, buds, and insects	VU Unknown

Genus Microdipodops – Merriam, 1891 – two species
Common name	Scientific name and subspecies	Range	Size and ecology	IUCN status and estimated population
Dark kangaroo mouse	M. megacephalus Merriam, 1891 Thirteen subspecies: M. m. albiventer; M. m. ambiguus; M. m. atrirelictus; M. m. californicus; M. m. leucotis; M. m. medius; M. m. megacephalus; M. m. nasutus; M. m. nexus; M. m. oregonus; M. m. paululus; M. m. polionotus; M. m. sabulonis	Western United States (in red)	Size: About 7 cm (3 in) long, plus 6–11 cm (2–4 in) tail Habitat: Shrubland and desert Diet: Grains and insects	LC Unknown
Pale kangaroo mouse	M. pallidus Merriam, 1901 Five subspecies: M. p. ammophilus; M. p. pallidus; M. p. purus; M. p. restrictus; M. p. ruficollaris	Western United States (in blue)	Size: About 7 cm (3 in) long, plus 7–10 cm (3–4 in) tail Habitat: Desert Diet: Grains and insects	LC Unknown

=== Subfamily Heteromyinae ===
Genus Heteromys – Desmarest, 1817 – fourteen species
Common name	Scientific name and subspecies	Range	Size and ecology	IUCN status and estimated population
Desmarest's spiny pocket mouse	H. desmarestianus Gray, 1868 Twelve subspecies: H. d. chiriquensis; H. d. crassirostris; H. d. desmarestianus; H. d. fuscatus; H. d. goldmani; H. d. panamensis; H. d. planifrons; H. d. repens; H. d. subaffinis; H. d. temporalis; H. d. underwoodi; H. d. zonalis	Southern Mexico, Central America, and northwestern South America	Size: 13–14 cm (5–6 in) long, plus 14–15 cm (6 in) tail Habitat: Forest Diet: Seeds, leaves, twigs, and succulent plants	LC Unknown
Ecuadoran spiny pocket mouse	H. teleus Anderson & Jarrín-Valladares, 2002	Ecuador	Size: About 14 cm (6 in) long, plus about 15 cm (6 in) tail Habitat: Forest Diet: Seeds, leaves, twigs, and succulent plants	VU Unknown
Gaumer's spiny pocket mouse	H. gaumeri Allen & Chapman, 1897	Eastern Mexico and northern Central America	Size: 12–13 cm (5 in) long, plus 14–16 cm (6 in) tail Habitat: Forest Diet: Seeds, leaves, twigs, and succulent plants	LC Unknown
Jaliscan spiny pocket mouse	H. spectabilis (Genoways, 1971)	Central Mexico	Size: 10–11 cm (4 in) long, plus 12–15 cm (5–6 in) tail Habitat: Forest Diet: Seeds, leaves, twigs, and succulent plants	EN Unknown
Mexican spiny pocket mouse	H. irroratus Gray, 1868 Seven subspecies: H. i. alleni; H. i. bulleri; H. i. guerrerensis; H. i. irroratus; H. i. jaliscensis; H. i. texensis; H. i. torridus	Southern United States and Mexico	Size: 11–13 cm (4–5 in) long, plus 9–17 cm (4–7 in) tail Habitat: Shrubland Diet: Seeds, leaves, twigs, and succulent plants	LC Unknown
Mountain spiny pocket mouse	H. oresterus Harris Jr., 1932	Costa Rica	Size: 14–16 cm (6 in) long, plus 16–18 cm (6–7 in) tail Habitat: Forest Diet: Seeds, leaves, twigs, and succulent plants	LC Unknown
Nelson's spiny pocket mouse	H. nelsoni Merriam, 1902	Eastern Mexico and Guatemala	Size: 15–17 cm (6–7 in) long, plus 18–20 cm (7–8 in) tail Habitat: Forest Diet: Seeds, leaves, twigs, and succulent plants	EN Unknown
Overlook spiny pocket mouse	H. catopterius Anderson & Gutiérrez, 2009	Venezuela	Size: About 13 cm (5 in) long, plus about 17 cm (7 in) tail Habitat: Forest Diet: Seeds, leaves, twigs, and succulent plants	LC Unknown
Painted spiny pocket mouse	H. pictus Thomas, 1893 Four subspecies: H. p. annectens; H. p. hispidus; H. p. pictus; H. p. plantinarensis	Mexico	Size: About 11 cm (4 in) long, plus 9–17 cm (4–7 in) tail Habitat: Forest and shrubland Diet: Seeds, leaves, twigs, and succulent plants	LC Unknown
Panamanian spiny pocket mouse	H. adspersus Peters, 1874	Panama	Size: 12–13 cm (5 in) long, plus 10–15 cm (4–6 in) tail Habitat: Forest and shrubland Diet: Seeds, leaves, twigs, and succulent plants	LC Unknown
Paraguaná spiny pocket mouse	H. oasicus Anderson, 2003	Northern Venezuela	Size: About 12 cm (5 in) long, plus about 12 cm (5 in) tail Habitat: Forest Diet: Seeds, leaves, twigs, and succulent plants	EN Unknown
Salvin's spiny pocket mouse	H. salvini Thomas, 1893 Three subspecies: H. s. crispus; H. s. salvini; H. s. vulcani	Eastern Mexico and Central America	Size: 10–12 cm (4–5 in) long, plus 8–16 cm (3–6 in) tail Habitat: Forest Diet: Seeds, leaves, twigs, and succulent plants	LC Unknown
Southern spiny pocket mouse	H. australis Thomas, 1901 Three subspecies: H. a. australis; H. a. conscius; H. a. pacificus	Panama and northwestern South America	Size: 12–13 cm (5 in) long, plus 13–14 cm (5–6 in) tail Habitat: Forest Diet: Seeds, leaves, twigs, and succulent plants	LC Unknown
Trinidad spiny pocket mouse	H. anomalus (Thompson, 1815) Four subspecies: H. a. anomalus; H. a. brachialis; H. a. hershkovitzi; H. a. jesupi	Northern South America	Size: 12–14 cm (5–6 in) long, plus 15–16 cm (6 in) tail Habitat: Forest Diet: Seeds, leaves, twigs, and succulent plants	LC Unknown

=== Subfamily Perognathinae ===
Genus Chaetodipus – Merriam, 1889 – eighteen species
Common name	Scientific name and subspecies	Range	Size and ecology	IUCN status and estimated population
Bailey's pocket mouse	C. baileyi (Merriam, 1894) Two subspecies: C. b. baileyi; C. b. insularis	Southwestern United States and Mexico	Size: 8–10 cm (3–4 in) long, plus 10–13 cm (4–5 in) tail Habitat: Desert Diet: Seeds, as well as vegetation and insects	LC Unknown
Baja pocket mouse	C. rudinoris (Elliot, 1903) Six subspecies: C. r. extimus; C. r. fornicatus; C. r. hueyi; C. r. knekus; C. r. mesidios; C. r. rudinoris	Western United States and western Mexico	Size: 8–10 cm (3–4 in) long, plus 10–13 cm (4–5 in) tail Habitat: Rocky areas and desert Diet: Seeds, as well as vegetation and insects	LC Unknown
California pocket mouse	C. californicus (Merriam, 1889) Eight subspecies: C. c. bensoni; C. c. bernardinus; C. c. californicus; C. c. dispar; C. c. femoralis; C. c. marinensis; C. c. mesopolius; C. c. ochrus	Western United States and western Mexico	Size: 8–10 cm (3–4 in) long, plus 10–15 cm (4–6 in) tail Habitat: Shrubland, grassland, and desert Diet: Seeds, as well as vegetation and insects	LC Unknown
Cerralvo Island pocket mouse	C. siccus (Osgood, 1907)	Western Mexico	Size: About 7 cm (3 in) long, plus about 9 cm (4 in) tail Habitat: Shrubland Diet: Seeds, as well as vegetation and insects	LC Unknown
Chihuahuan pocket mouse	C. eremicus (Mearns, 1898) Two subspecies: C. e. atrodorsalis; C. e. eremicus	Southern United States and Mexico	Size: 7–9 cm (3–4 in) long, plus 7–10 cm (3–4 in) tail Habitat: Shrubland and desert Diet: Seeds, as well as vegetation and insects	LC Unknown
Dalquest's pocket mouse	C. ammophilus Osgood, 1907	Western Mexico	Size: About 7 cm (3 in) long, plus about 9 cm (4 in) tail Habitat: Desert Diet: Seeds, as well as vegetation and insects	NT Unknown
Desert pocket mouse	C. penicillatus (Woodhouse, 1852) Six subspecies: C. p. angustirostris; C. p. penicillatus; C. p. pricei; C. p. seri; C. p. sobrinus; C. p. stephensi	Southwestern United States and Mexico	Size: 7–9 cm (3–4 in) long, plus 8–13 cm (3–5 in) tail Habitat: Shrubland and desert Diet: Seeds, as well as vegetation and insects	LC Unknown
Goldman's pocket mouse	C. goldmani (Osgood, 1900)	Western Mexico	Size: About 8 cm (3 in) long, plus about 11 cm (4 in) tail Habitat: Forest and shrubland Diet: Seeds, as well as vegetation and insects	NT Unknown
Hispid pocket mouse	C. hispidus (Baird, 1858) Four subspecies: C. h. hispidus; C. h. paradoxus; C. h. spilotus; C. h. zacatecae	United States and Mexico	Size: 9–12 cm (4–5 in) long, plus 9–12 cm (4–5 in) tail Habitat: Shrubland and grassland Diet: Seeds, as well as vegetation and insects	LC Unknown
Lined pocket mouse	C. lineatus (Dalquest, 1951)	Central Mexico	Size: About 7 cm (3 in) long, plus about 9 cm (4 in) tail Habitat: Desert Diet: Seeds, as well as vegetation and insects	DD Unknown
Little desert pocket mouse	C. arenarius (Merriam, 1894) Eleven subspecies: C. a. albescens; C. a. albulus; C. a. ambiguus; C. a. ammophilus; C. a. arenarius; C. a. helleri; C. a. mexicalis; C. a. paralios; C. a. sabulosus; C. a. siccus; C. a. sublucidus	Western Mexico	Size: 6–7 cm (2–3 in) long, plus 8–9 cm (3–4 in) tail Habitat: Desert Diet: Seeds, as well as vegetation and insects	LC Unknown
Long-tailed pocket mouse	C. formosus (Merriam, 1889) Seven subspecies: C. f. cinerascens; C. f. formosus; C. f. incolatus; C. f. infolatus; C. f. melanurus; C. f. mesembrinus; C. f. mohavensis	Western United States and western Mexico	Size: 7–9 cm (3–4 in) long, plus 8–13 cm (3–5 in) tail Habitat: Shrubland, rocky areas, and desert Diet: Seeds, as well as vegetation and insects	LC Unknown
Narrow-skulled pocket mouse	C. artus (Osgood, 1900)	Western Mexico	Size: 8–10 cm (3–4 in) long, plus 9–10 cm (4 in) tail Habitat: Desert Diet: Seeds, as well as vegetation and insects	LC Unknown
Nelson's pocket mouse	C. nelsoni (Merriam, 1894) Two subspecies: C. n. canescens; C. n. nelsoni	Southern United States and Mexico	Size: 7–9 cm (3–4 in) long, plus 8–12 cm (3–5 in) tail Habitat: Shrubland, rocky areas, and desert Diet: Seeds, as well as vegetation and insects	LC Unknown
Rock pocket mouse	C. intermedius (Merriam, 1889) Eight subspecies: C. i. ater; C. i. beardi; C. i. crinitus; C. i. intermedius; C. i. lithophilus; C. i. minimus; C. i. phasma; C. i. rupestris	Southwestern United States and Mexico	Size: 7–8 cm (3 in) long, plus 8–12 cm (3–5 in) tail Habitat: Grassland, rocky areas, and desert Diet: Seeds, as well as vegetation and insects	LC Unknown
San Diego pocket mouse	C. fallax (Merriam, 1889) Six subspecies: C. f. anthonyi; C. f. fallax; C. f. inopinus; C. f. majusculus; C. f. pallidus; C. f. xerotrophicus	Western United States and western Mexico	Size: 8–9 cm (3–4 in) long, plus 8–12 cm (3–5 in) tail Habitat: Shrubland and desert Diet: Seeds, as well as vegetation and insects	LC Unknown
Sinaloan pocket mouse	C. pernix (Allen, 1898) Two subspecies: C. p. pernix; C. p. rostratus	Western Mexico	Size: About 8 cm (3 in) long, plus about 8 cm (3 in) tail Habitat: Shrubland Diet: Seeds, as well as vegetation and insects	LC Unknown
Spiny pocket mouse	C. spinatus (Merriam, 1889) Eighteen subspecies: C. s. broccus; C. s. bryanti; C. s. evermanni; C. s. guardiae; C. s. lambi; C. s. latijugularis; C. s. lorenzi; C. s. macrosensis; C. s. magdalenae; C. s. margaritae; C. s. occultus; C. s. oribates; C. s. peninsulae; C. s. prietae; C. s. pullus; C. s. rufescens; C. s. seorsus; C. s. spinatus	Western United States and western Mexico	Size: 7–10 cm (3–4 in) long, plus 8–13 cm (3–5 in) tail Habitat: Rocky areas and desert Diet: Seeds, as well as vegetation and insects	LC Unknown

Genus Perognathus – Wied-Neuwied, 1839 – nine species
Common name	Scientific name and subspecies	Range	Size and ecology	IUCN status and estimated population
Arizona pocket mouse	P. amplus Osgood, 1900 Four subspecies: P. a. amplus; P. a. cineris; P. a. pergracilis; P. a. taylori	Southwestern United States and western Mexico	Size: About 7 cm (3 in) long, plus about 8 cm (3 in) tail Habitat: Forest, grassland, and desert Diet: Seeds, as well as vegetation and insects	LC Unknown
Great Basin pocket mouse	P. parvus (Peale, 1848) Twelve subspecies: P. p. bullatus; P. p. clarus; P. p. columbianus; P. p. idahoensis; P. p. laingi; P. p. lordi; P. p. mollipilosus; P. p. olivaceus; P. p. parvus; P. p. trumbullensis; P. p. xanthanotus; P. p. yakimensis	Western United States and southwestern Canada	Size: Unknown Habitat: Forest, shrubland, grassland, and desert Diet: Seeds, as well as vegetation and insects	LC Unknown
Little pocket mouse	P. longimembris (Coues, 1875) Sixteen subspecies: P. l. aestivus; P. l. arizonensis; P. l. bangsi; P. l. bombycinus; P. l. brevinasus; P. l. gulosus; P. l. internationalis; P. l. kinoensis; P. l. longimembris; P. l. nevadensis; P. l. pacificus (Pacific pocket mouse); P. l. panamintinus; P. l. pimensis; P. l. salinensis; P. l. tularensis; P. l. venustus	Western United States and western Mexico	Size: About 6 cm (2 in) long, plus about 7 cm (3 in) tail Habitat: Shrubland, grassland, and desert Diet: Seeds, as well as vegetation and insects	LC Unknown
Merriam's pocket mouse	P. merriami Allen, 1892 Two subspecies: P. m. gilvus; P. m. merriami	Southern United States and northern Mexico	Size: 5–6 cm (2 in) long, plus 4–7 cm (2–3 in) tail Habitat: Shrubland, grassland, and desert Diet: Seeds, as well as vegetation and insects	LC Unknown
Olive-backed pocket mouse	P. fasciatus Wied-Neuwied, 1839 Two subspecies: P. f. callistus; P. f. fasciatus	Northern-central United States and southern-central Canada	Size: About 7 cm (3 in) long, plus about 7 cm (3 in) tail Habitat: Shrubland and grassland Diet: Seeds, as well as vegetation and insects	LC Unknown
Plains pocket mouse	P. flavescens Merriam, 1889 Eight subspecies: P. f. apache; P. f. caryi; P. f. cockrumi; P. f. copei; P. f. flavescens; P. f. melanotis; P. f. perniger; P. f. relictus	Central United States and northern Mexico	Size: About 7 cm (3 in) long, plus about 6 cm (2 in) tail Habitat: Shrubland, grassland, and desert Diet: Seeds, as well as vegetation and insects	LC Unknown
San Joaquin pocket mouse	P. inornatus Merriam, 1889 Three subspecies: P. i. inornatus; P. i. neglectus; P. i. psammophilus	Western United States	Size: About 7 cm (3 in) long, plus about 8 cm (3 in) tail Habitat: Savanna, grassland, and desert Diet: Seeds, as well as vegetation and insects	LC Unknown
Silky pocket mouse	P. flavus Baird, 1855 Fourteen subspecies: P. f. bimaculatus; P. f. bunkeri; P. f. flavus; P. f. fuliginosus; P. f. fuscus; P. f. goodpasteri; P. f. hopiensis; P. f. medius; P. f. mexicanus; P. f. pallescens; P. f. parviceps; P. f. piperi; P. f. sanluisi; P. f. sonoriensis	Southern-central United States and Mexico	Size: About 6 cm (2 in) long, plus about 5 cm (2 in) tail Habitat: Shrubland, grassland, and desert Diet: Seeds, as well as vegetation and insects	LC Unknown
White-eared pocket mouse	P. alticolus Rhoads, 1894 Two subspecies: P. a. alticolus; P. a. inexpectatus	Western United States	Size: 7–8 cm (3 in) long, plus 7–9 cm (3–4 in) tail Habitat: Forest, shrubland, grassland, and desert Diet: Seeds, as well as vegetation and insects	VU Unknown

== Sources ==
- Chernasky, Amy; Motis, Anna; Burgin, Connor, eds. (2023). All the Mammals of the World. Lynx Nature Books. ISBN 978-84-16728-66-4.
- Nowak, Ronald M. (1999). Walker's Mammals of the World. Vol. 2 (6th ed.). Johns Hopkins University Press. ISBN 978-0-8018-5789-8.
- Patton, James L. (2005). Wilson, Don E.; Reeder, DeeAnn M. (eds.). Mammal Species of the World. Vol. 2 (3rd ed.). Johns Hopkins University Press. ISBN 978-0-8018-8221-0.
