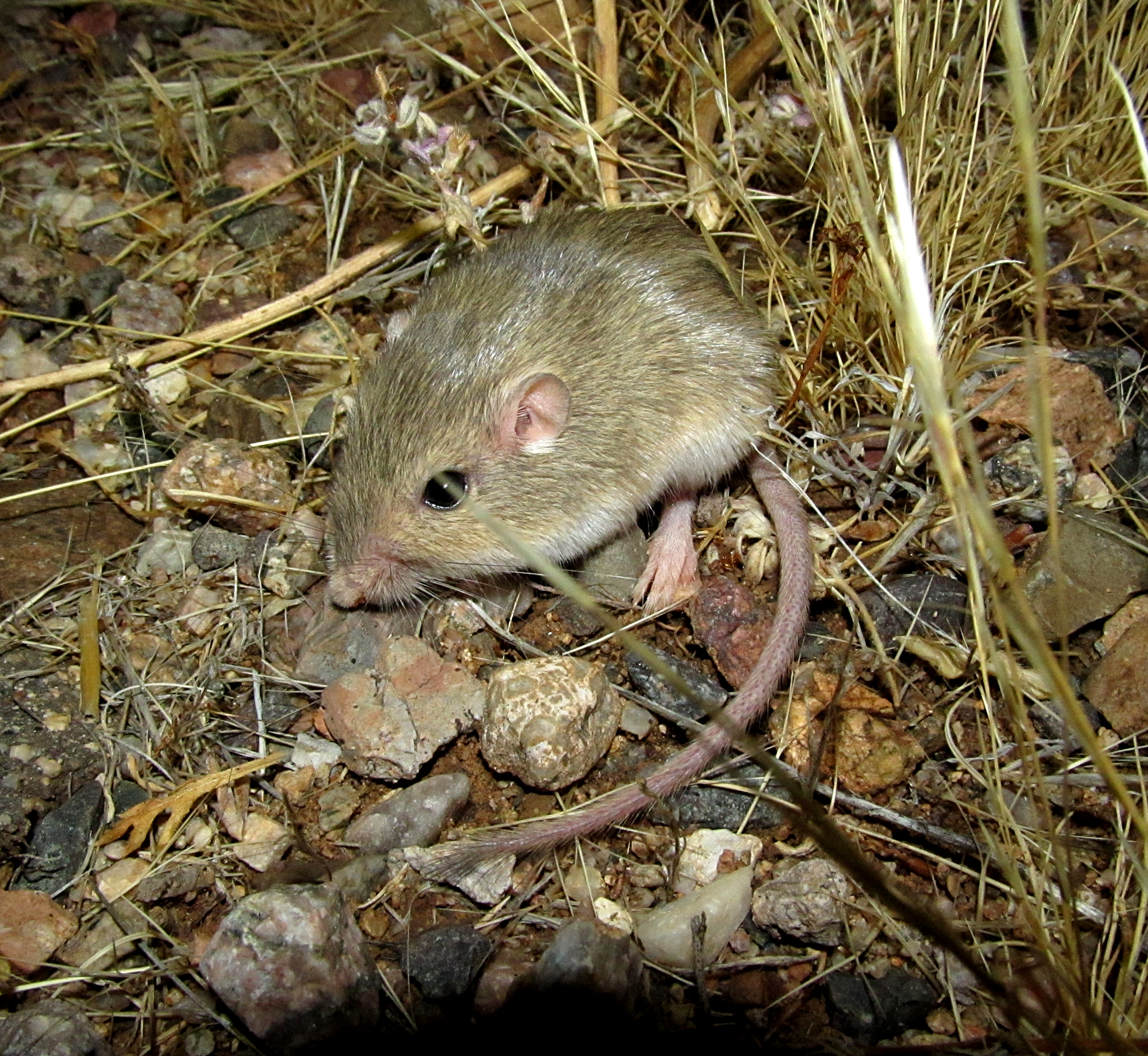
- Silky pocket mouse (Perognathus flavus)

Scientific classification
- Kingdom: Animalia
- Phylum: Chordata
- Class: Mammalia
- Infraclass: Placentalia
- Order: Rodentia
- Family: Heteromyidae
- Subfamily: Perognathinae; Coues, 1875

Genera
- Chaetodipus; Perognathus

= Perognathinae =

Pocket mice Temporal range: Early Miocene–Recent

Subfamily of rodents

Perognathinae is a subfamily of rodents consisting of two genera of pocket mice. Most species live in complex burrows within the deserts and grasslands of western North America. They feed mostly on seeds and other plant parts, which they carry in their fur-lined cheek pouches to their burrows.

== Description ==
There are about 26 members of the subfamily Perognathinae divided into two genera. They are all small rodents. Adaptations include partially fused vertebrae in the neck, short forelimbs, and much enlarged bullae (bubble-shaped bones in the skull). The dental formula is 1/1, 0/0, 1/1, 3/3 making twenty teeth in total. The molars have two-lobed cusps. The upper incisors are grooved and the enamel on the molars is quickly worn away by chewing leaving the dentine exposed. The cheek teeth have roots.

Fur-lined cheek pouches are a feature across the family Heteromyidae. They have openings near the mouth and extend backwards along the sides of the neck. The fur on the animal's body is in general short and fine and often matches in colour the soil of the region in which the animal lives, being some shade of buff, pale brown, reddish-brown or grey.

== Distribution ==
Pocket mice are distributed from southwestern Canada through the western and Great Plains regions of the United States to central Mexico. They are creatures of open country, mostly specialising in prairies, arid lands and desert fringes.

== Behaviour ==
Pocket mice are adapted for life in deserts and other arid environments where they largely feed on dry seeds. They carry most of the seeds they find back to their burrows in exterior cheek folds lined with fur rather than in cheek pouches inside the mouth as do hamsters. This is because carrying the food in the mouth would involve wetting it and moisture needs to be conserved as much as possible in dry environments. Most species store the seeds they gather in special chambers in the burrow where they absorb moisture from the humid air.

It has been found that there is little hoarding done in the winter but that food is most commonly stored in the autumn and spring. Heteromyds use sight and olfactory clues to locate possible food and then use their fore-feet to manipulate objects. Pocket mice hunt around under vegetation or debris for individual food items. It has been found that they forage more efficiently than kangaroo rats and this is thought to be due to the fact that they handle their finds more and are better able to distinguish between food and non-food items.

These animals excavate long burrow systems with passages, chambers and multiple entrances. They are largely nocturnal, feeding and moving about at night and resting deep in their burrows during the day. Here it is cooler and more humid which conserves moisture and the animals may temporarily block the entrances to augment this. They are able to concentrate their urine to a viscous consistency which further reduces water loss. Under extreme conditions, some are able to aestivate in chambers under ground.

Pocket mice normally run around on four limbs but can also move with leaps.

== Ecology ==
Pocket mice are eaten by foxes, coyotes, snakes and birds. They have acute hearing and can detect the approaching swoop of an owl or the movements of a snake. Many can leap to avoid the predators as they seek the safety of their burrows.

In the Sonoran Desert there are many closely related species of heteromyid mice and rats. Each has its own niche in the environment which means that they do not unnecessarily compete with each other for the limited available resources. Bailey's pocket mouse climbs into plants and bushes in order to find seeds and berries still attached to the plant. It is the only species able to eat the wax found inside the seeds of the jojoba plant. The desert pocket mouse forages across the open desert floor and gathers seeds that have fallen to the ground.

== Taxonomy ==
Perognathinae is the sister group of Heteromyinae; the two are estimated to have split about 22–23 million years (Ma) ago. The most recent common ancestor of extant Perognathinae species is thought to have lived 20–21 Ma ago, when the two genera split. The most recent common ancestors of extant members of Chaetodipus and Perognathus are thought to have lived 14–15 and 17–18 Ma ago, respectively.

- Subfamily Perognathinae – pocket mice
  - Genus Chaetodipus
    - Little desert pocket mouse, Chaetodipus arenarius
    - Narrow-skulled pocket mouse, Chaetodipus artus
    - Bailey's pocket mouse, Chaetodipus baileyi
    - California pocket mouse, Chaetodipus californicus
    - Dalquest's pocket mouse, Chaetodipus dalquesti
    - Chihuahuan pocket mouse, Chaetodipus eremicus
    - San Diego pocket mouse, Chaetodipus fallax
    - Long-tailed pocket mouse, Chaetodipus formosus
    - Goldman's pocket mouse, Chaetodipus goldmani
    - Hispid pocket mouse, Chaetodipus hispidus
    - Rock pocket mouse, Chaetodipus intermedius
    - Lined pocket mouse, Chaetodipus lineatus
    - Nelson's pocket mouse, Chaetodipus nelsoni
    - Desert pocket mouse, Chaetodipus penicillatus
    - Sinaloan pocket mouse, Chaetodipus pernix
    - Baja pocket mouse, Chaetodipus rudinoris
    - Spiny pocket mouse, Chaetodipus spinatus
  - Genus Perognathus
    - White-eared pocket mouse, Perognathus alticola
    - Arizona pocket mouse, Perognathus amplus
    - Olive-backed pocket mouse, Perognathus fasciatus
    - Plains pocket mouse, Perognathus flavescens
    - Silky pocket mouse, Perognathus flavus
    - San Joaquin pocket mouse, Perognathus inornatus
    - Little pocket mouse, Perognathus longimembris
    - Merriam's pocket mouse, Perognathus merriami
    - Great Basin pocket mouse, Perognathus parvus
