= Spiny pocket mice =

Spiny pocket mice may refer to various rodent species of the family Heteromyidae of southern North America and northwestern South America:

- Heteromys sp. in subfamily Heteromyinae
- Spiny pocket mouse, Chaetodipus spinatus, in subfamily Perognathinae
