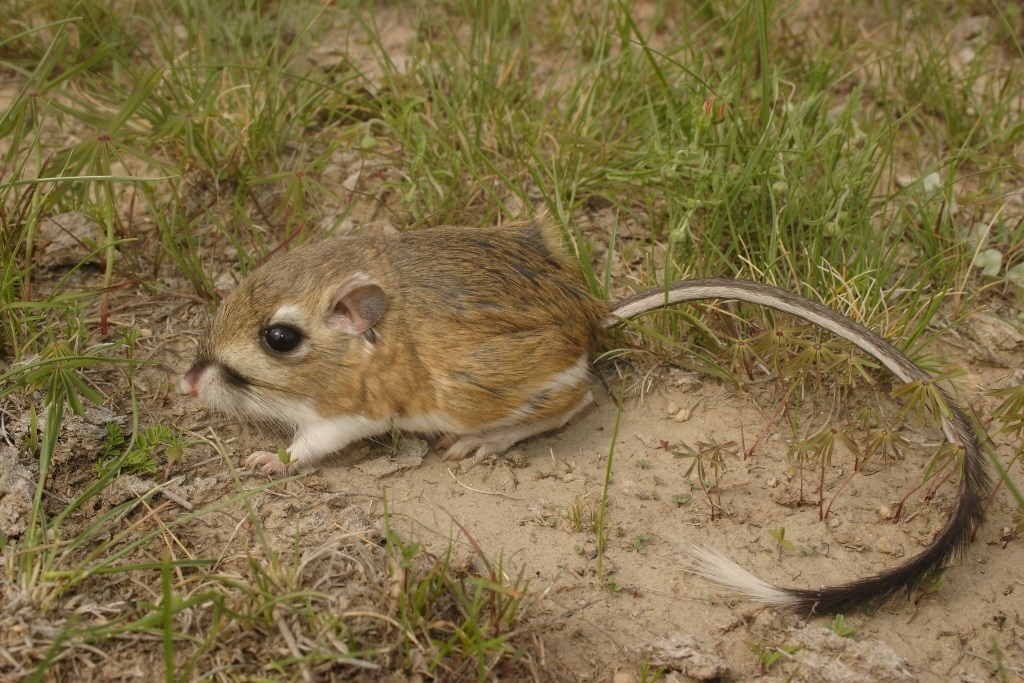

Conservation status
- Least Concern (IUCN 3.1)

Scientific classification
- Kingdom: Animalia
- Phylum: Chordata
- Class: Mammalia
- Order: Rodentia
- Family: Heteromyidae
- Genus: Dipodomys
- Species: D. ornatus

Binomial name
- Dipodomys ornatus Merriam, 1894
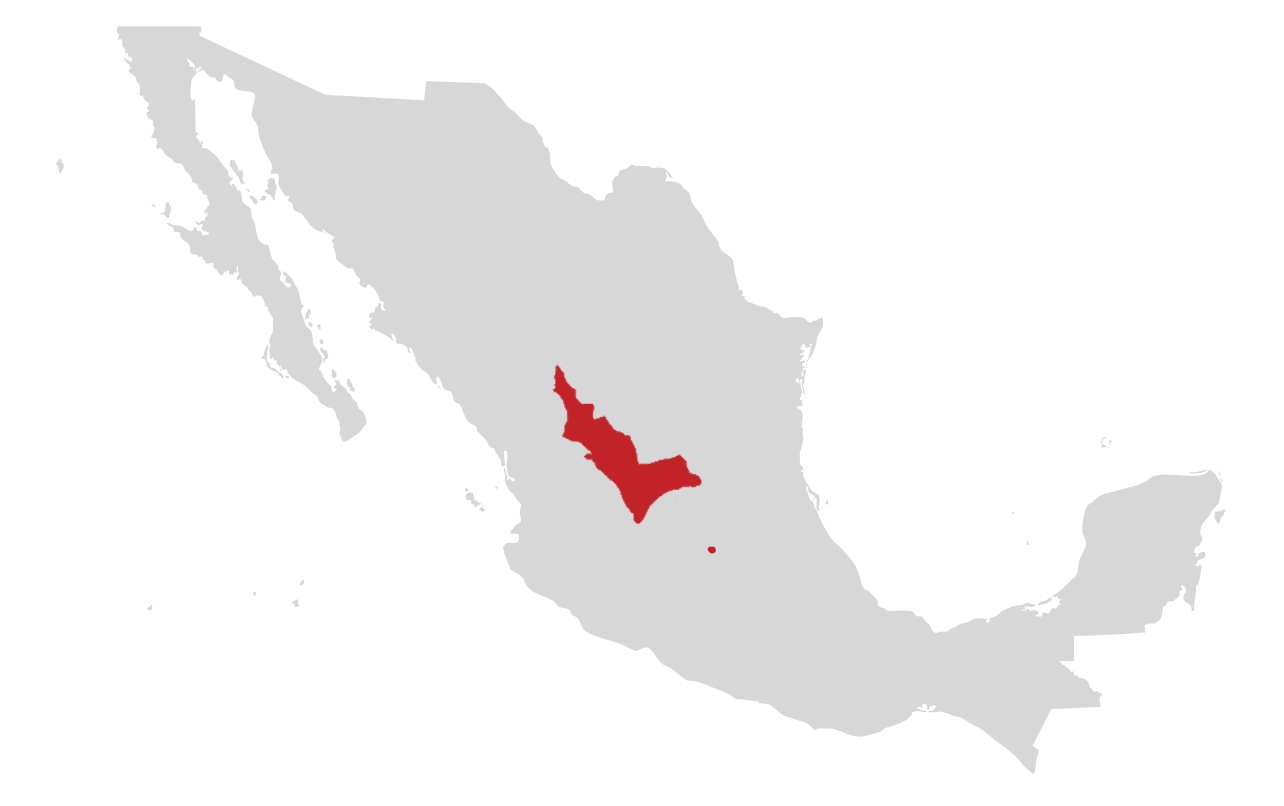
- Distribution of D. ornatus

Synonyms
- Dipodomys phillipsii subsp. ornatus Merriam, 1894

= Dipodomys ornatus =

Species of rodent

Dipodomys ornatus, commonly known as the ornate kangaroo rat or plateau kangaroo rat, is a species of kangaroo rat in the family Heteromyidae. Found in Mexico, Dipodmys ornatus was originally thought to be a subspecies of Phillips's kangaroo rat, D. phillipsi, and was described as such in 1894 by Clinton Hart Merriam. It was recognized as a subspecies until 2012.

== Distribution and habitat ==
Throughout Mexico, D. ornatus is found in primarily central areas; Aguascalientes, Durango, Guanajuato, Jalisco, San Luis Potosí, and Zacatecas. They are located in areas with cacti, namely the prickly pear species, along with catclaw.

== Description ==
Members of the species Dipodomys ornatus exhibit sexual dimorphism in that males and females vary in size, with the males being marginally longer; in both genders, the species' black and white and somewhat long tail can be compared to its body, which is mostly colored like cinnamon. It is four-toed on its hindfeet, and, on average, it is medium-sized compared to other kangaroo rat species (being 252–302 mm long).
