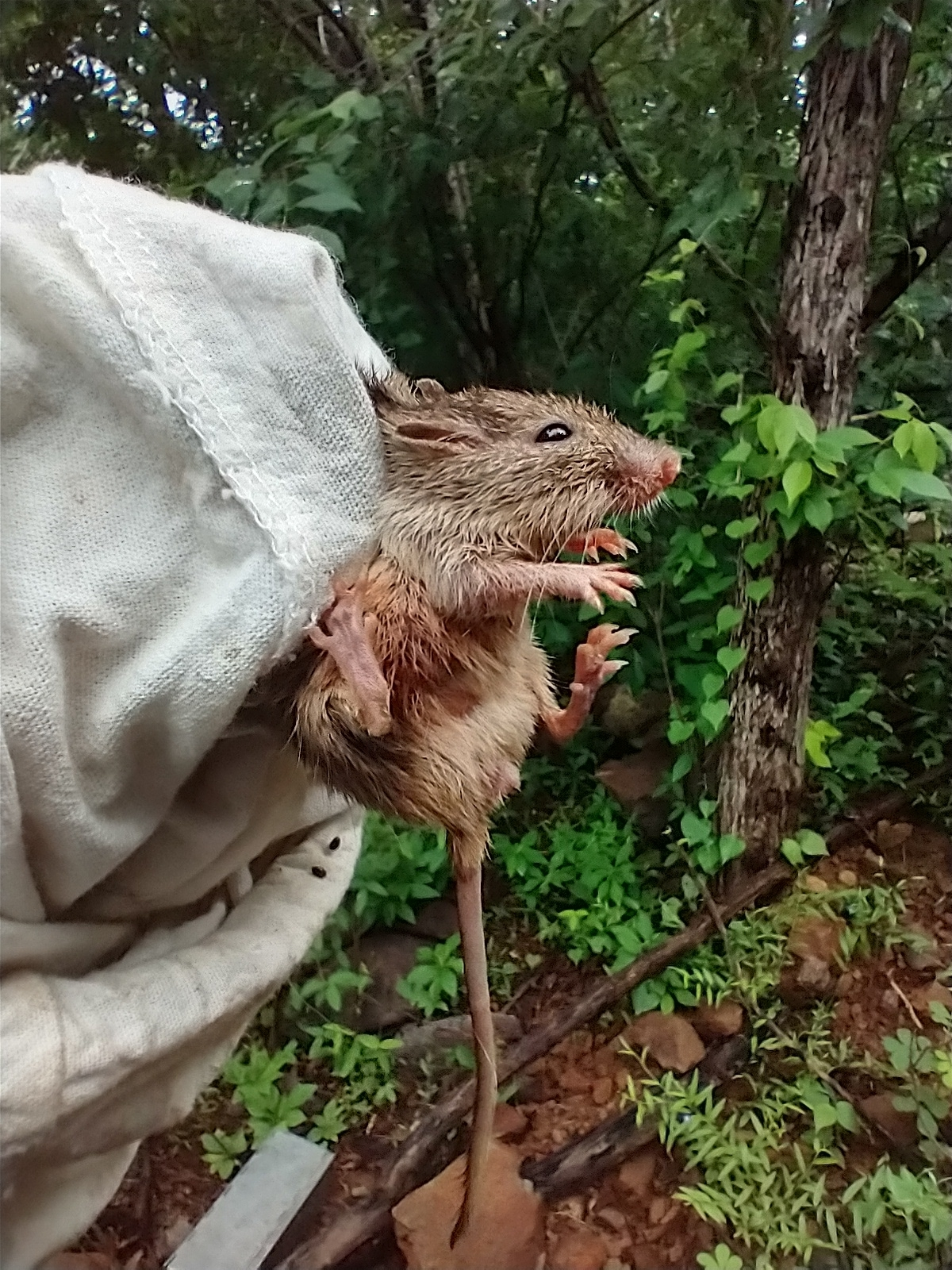
- A narrow-skulled pocket mouse in Sinaloa, Mexico

Conservation status
- Least Concern (IUCN 3.1)

Scientific classification
- Kingdom: Animalia
- Phylum: Chordata
- Class: Mammalia
- Order: Rodentia
- Family: Heteromyidae
- Genus: Chaetodipus
- Species: C. artus

Binomial name
- Chaetodipus artus (Osgood, 1900)

= Narrow-skulled pocket mouse =

Species of rodent

The narrow-skulled pocket mouse (Chaetodipus artus) is a species of rodent in the family Heteromyidae. It is endemic to western Mexico, living west of the Sierra Madre Occidental crest.

== Description ==
The narrow-skulled pocket mouse is a medium-sized species growing to a length of about 185 mm (7.3 in) including a tail of about 96 mm (3.8 in). Males are slightly larger than females. The skull is smaller and narrower than that of Goldman's pocket mouse (Chaetodipus goldmani) which is native to the same parts of Mexico. Apart from the skull, other features which distinguish it from Goldman's pocket mouse include a less hairy but more scaly tail with a wider dorsal stripe, a smaller total length, darker ears and darker, less-grizzled dorsal fur. In the drainage of the Rio Septentrion this species has a darker coat than elsewhere. The reason for this may lie in the fact that the soil is darker in this area and pale individuals are more easily spotted by diurnal predators. It feeds on seeds.

== Distribution and habitat ==
The narrow-skulled pocket mouse is endemic to Mexico and is found in the states of Chihuahua, Sonora, Durango and Sinaloa. It is found in different habitats in different parts of its range. In Chihuahua it is restricted to rocky areas and canyons while in Durango it occurs in humid tropical forests on the western foothills of the Sierra Madre Occidental. In Sonora it occurs among mesquite (Prosopis juliflora) in sandy areas near the Rio Mayo, in the bottoms of gullies and on the verges of cultivated land and in northern Sinaloa it occurs at higher altitudes in more humid, short-tree woodland. Where it co-occurs with Goldman's pocket mouse it usually occupies more riverine habitats while Goldman's pocket mouse occupies drier places away from the rivers. Other mammals sharing its habitat include the painted spiny pocket mouse (Liomys pictus), the Sinaloan pocket mouse (Chaetodipus pernix), the southern grasshopper mouse (Onychomys torridus), the white-throated woodrat (Neotoma albigula), the cactus mouse (Peromyscus eremicus) and the antelope jackrabbit (Lepus alleni).

== Conservation status ==
The narrow-skulled pocket mouse is common throughout much of its wide range and its total population size is presumed to be large. It is found in some protected areas but when it moves into agricultural land, it is at risk of rodenticides being used to poison it. The International Union for Conservation of Nature has rated it as being of "least concern".
