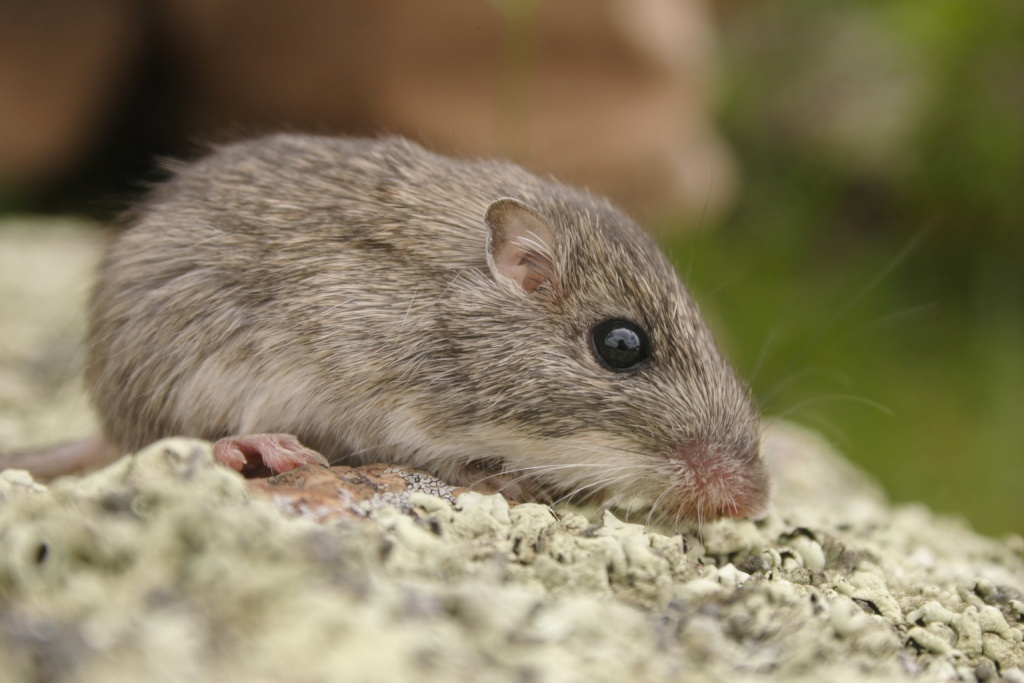

Conservation status
- Least Concern (IUCN 3.1)

Scientific classification
- Kingdom: Animalia
- Phylum: Chordata
- Class: Mammalia
- Order: Rodentia
- Family: Heteromyidae
- Genus: Chaetodipus
- Species: C. eremicus

Binomial name
- Chaetodipus eremicus (Mearns, 1898)

Synonyms
- C. pencillatus eremicus

= Chihuahuan pocket mouse =

Species of rodent

The Chihuahuan pocket mouse (Chaetodipus eremicus) is a species of heteromyid rodent found in the southwestern United States and Mexico. It was formerly considered a subspecies of the desert pocket mouse (C. pencillatus), but was determined to be a distinct species in 1996, following analysis of its mitochondrial DNA.

== Description ==
Chihuahuan pocket mice are moderately sized rodents, with a total adult length of 16 to 18 centimetres (6.3 to 7.1 in), including the tail, and weighing 15 to 23 grams (0.5 to 0.8 oz). The fur is buff sprinkled with black over the back and sides, and white on the tail and underparts. The hairs on the rump are long and slender, but there are no spines, such as are present on the otherwise very similar rock pocket mouse. The tail is long, measuring 8 to 11 cm (3.1 to 4.3 in), and ends in a large tuft of white fur.

The mice are herbivorous, mainly feeding on the seeds of plants such as broomweed, mesquite, and creosotebush, although they will also eat grasses when seeds are in short supply. They are nocturnal, spending the day in burrows comprising a central chamber from which numerous tunnels fan out to separate openings on the surface. The multiple openings to the burrow are closed during the day. They are most active during the spring, and may enter torpor for a few days at a time during the winter months. Breeding occurs from February to August, with most young being born around May. Litters typically consist of three or four young.

== Distribution and habitat ==
The Chihuahuan desert mouse inhabits the Chihuahuan Desert from western Texas and southern New Mexico in the United States, through northern and central Mexico as far as San Luis Potosí. It inhabits desert scrubland, preferring areas with soft or sandy soil, although it may occasionally be found in grassland or by river banks. The dominant vegetation in its habitat normally consists of plants such as mesquite, creosotebush, catclaw, and prickly pears. Two subspecies are recognised:

- Chaetodipus eremicus eremicus - majority of range
- Chaetodipus eremicus atrodorsalis - San Luis Potosí
