= Goldman's pocket mouse =

Conservation status
- Near Threatened (IUCN 3.1)

Scientific classification
- Kingdom: Animalia
- Phylum: Chordata
- Class: Mammalia
- Order: Rodentia
- Family: Heteromyidae
- Genus: Chaetodipus
- Species: C. goldmani

Binomial name
- Chaetodipus goldmani (Osgood, 1900)

Species of rodent

Goldman's pocket mouse (Chaetodipus goldmani) is a species of rodent in the family Heteromyidae. It is endemic to Mexico, where it is threatened by the increasing conversion of its dry, scrubby habitat into agricultural land. As a result, the International Union for Conservation of Nature has assessed its conservation status as being "near threatened".

== Description ==
A medium-sized rodent, Goldman's pocket mouse has a head-and-body length of 88 mm (3.5 in) and a tail length of 106 mm (4.2 in). The ears are black with white flecks, with the hind edges being whitish; there is a pale spot just below the ear. The upper parts of this mouse are brown, the rump being a little darker than the back, while the underparts are creamy-white. The tail is dark above and pale below. A population inhabiting an area of lava fields near Moctezuma, Sonora is darker than other populations. Other pocket mice inhabiting this part of Mexico with which Goldman's pocket mouse could be confused include the Sinaloan pocket mouse (Chaetodipus pernix), which is smaller, and Bailey's pocket mouse (Chaetodipus baileyi), which has darker dorsal fur.

== Distribution and habitat ==
The species is endemic to Mexico, where its range extends from northeastern and southeastern Sonora, through southwestern Chihuahua to northern Sinaloa in the strip of land to the west of the Sierra Madre Occidental. It occurs in dry thorny, scrubby areas, in arroyos, in sandy areas with mesquite and on cultivated land.

== Ecology ==
Little is known of the diet of this mouse, but it is known that it consumes grass seeds. Nor have its reproductive habits been studied but they are likely to be similar to C. pernix which breeds between October and April with a litter size of typically seven.

== Status ==
C. goldmani is not common, and the population trend is thought to be downwards. The chief threat it faces is the conversion of its natural habitat to agricultural land. It is able to adapt to farmland but suffers from the increasing use there of rodenticides to control pests. For these reasons, the International Union for Conservation of Nature has assessed the conservation status of this mouse as "near threatened".
