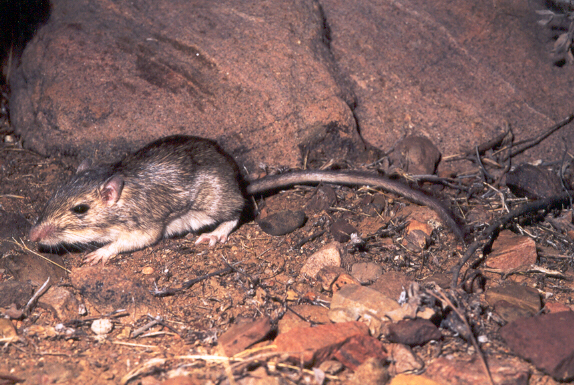
- Chaetodipus baileyi

Scientific classification
- Kingdom: Animalia
- Phylum: Chordata
- Class: Mammalia
- Infraclass: Placentalia
- Order: Rodentia
- Family: Heteromyidae
- Subfamily: Perognathinae
- Genus: Chaetodipus; Merriam, 1889

Type species
- Perognathus spinatus Merriam, 1889

Species
- Chaetodipus arenarius Chaetodipus artus Chaetodipus baileyi Chaetodipus californicus Chaetodipus dalquesti Chaetodipus eremicus Chaetodipus fallax Chaetodipus formosus Chaetodipus goldmani Chaetodipus hispidus Chaetodipus intermedius Chaetodipus lineatus Chaetodipus nelsoni Chaetodipus penicillatus Chaetodipus pernix Chaetodipus rudinoris Chaetodipus spinatus
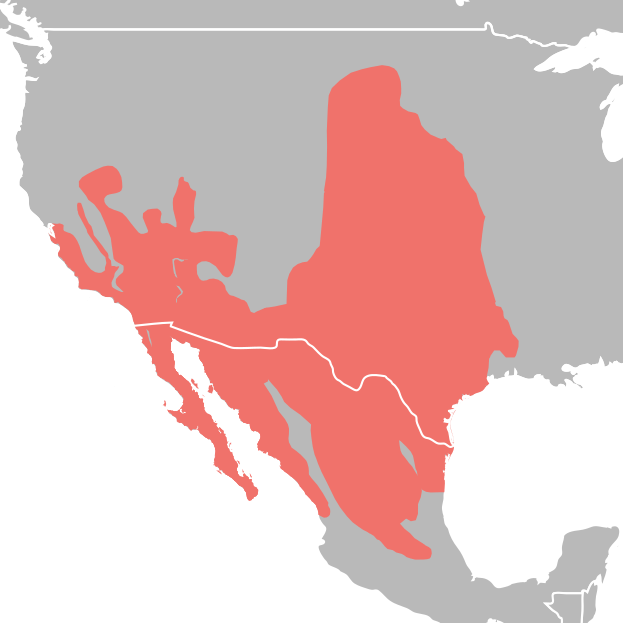
- Chaetodipus distribution

= Chaetodipus =

Genus of mammals

Chaetodipus is a genus of pocket mice containing 17 species endemic to the United States and Mexico. Like other members of their family such as pocket mice in the genus Perognathus, they are more closely related to pocket gophers than to true mice.

== Characteristics ==
Members of this genus range in size from 80 to 125 mm (head and body) and weigh 15–47 grams (Nowak, 1999). Unlike the silky pocket mice (genus Perognathus), most species of the genus Chaetodipus have harsh pelage with some bordering on spiny hair. They tend to be found in arid habitats where they feed on seeds, vegetation, and insects (Nowak, 1999). Females give birth to a litter of 2–9 young after a gestation period of just under a month. The longest recorded life span is 8 years and 4 months (Nowak, 1999).

== Species ==
- Chaetodipus arenarius – Little desert pocket mouse
- Chaetodipus artus – Narrow-skulled pocket mouse
- Chaetodipus baileyi – Bailey's pocket mouse
- Chaetodipus californicus – California pocket mouse
- Chaetodipus dalquesti – Dalquest's pocket mouse
- Chaetodipus eremicus – Chihuahuan pocket mouse
- Chaetodipus fallax – San Diego pocket mouse
- Chaetodipus formosus – Long-tailed pocket mouse
- Chaetodipus goldmani – Goldman's pocket mouse
- Chaetodipus hispidus – Hispid pocket mouse
- Chaetodipus intermedius – Rock pocket mouse
- Chaetodipus lineatus – Lined pocket mouse
- Chaetodipus nelsoni – Nelson's pocket mouse
- Chaetodipus penicillatus – Desert pocket mouse
- Chaetodipus pernix – Sinaloan pocket mouse
- Chaetodipus rudinoris – Baja pocket mouse
- Chaetodipus spinatus – Spiny pocket mouse

Sometimes members of the genus Chaetodipus are placed in the genus Perognathus.
