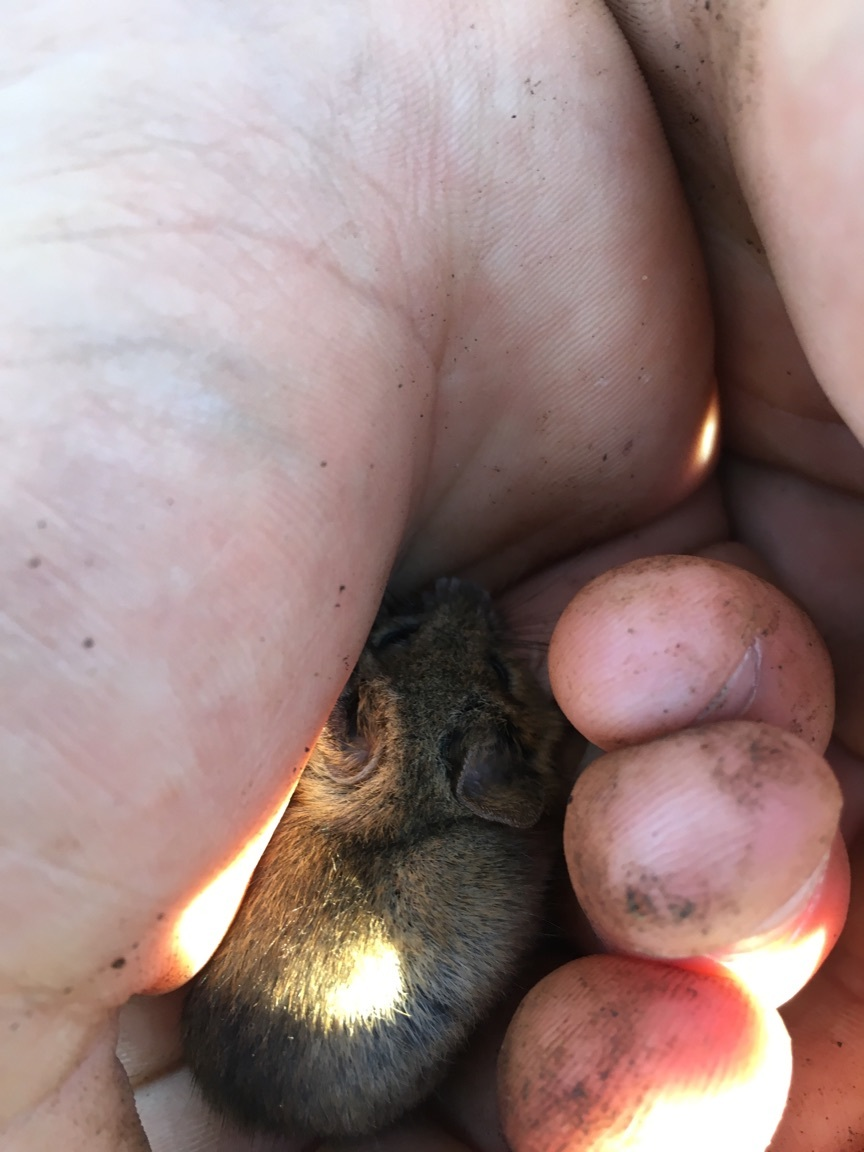
- In Pleasanton, California, US

Conservation status
- Least Concern (IUCN 3.1)

Scientific classification
- Kingdom: Animalia
- Phylum: Chordata
- Class: Mammalia
- Order: Rodentia
- Family: Heteromyidae
- Genus: Chaetodipus
- Species: C. californicus

Binomial name
- Chaetodipus californicus (Merriam, 1889)

= California pocket mouse =

Species of rodent

The California pocket mouse (Chaetodipus californicus) is a species of nocturnal and primarily solitary rodent in the family Heteromyidae.

== Distribution ==
Chaetodipus californicus is native to California in the western United States and northern Baja California state in north-western Mexico. It is found in habitats, such as California chaparral and woodlands, in Southern California throughout the Southern Sierra Nevada, Southern California Coast Ranges, and the Transverse Ranges; and in Southern California and northern Baja California in the Peninsular Ranges.

Eight known subspecies of C. californicus exist throughout its distribution. They are C. c. californicus, C. c. femoralis, C. c. dispar, C. c. mesopolius, C. c. ochrus, C. c. bernandinus, C. c. bensoni, and C. c. merinensis. They can be found around Berkeley in Alameda Co.; Dulzura, San Diego Co.; Carpenteria, Santa Barbara Co.; Sierra San Pedro Martir, Baja California; Santiago Springs, Kern Co.; San Bernardino Mountains in San Bernardino Co.; Soledad, Monterey Co.; and Indian Harbor, Monterey Co. The distribution boundaries for the Southern subspecies are less well known than the Northern ones. Despite their being relatively widespread over the majority of central and southern California, the known habitat of the Californian pocket mouse is shrinking due to climate change and other human activities such as residential development.

== Description ==
The dental formula of Chaetodipus californicus is 1.0.1.31.0.1.3 × 2 = 20 teeth in total.

Its fur is brown on top and tan underneath with distinct white hairs, or spines, near the rump. The tail is dark on top, light underneath and tufted at the end. Females and males are about the same size, showing no sexual dimorphism. C. californicus is often mistaken for C. fallax (San Diego pocket mouse) which shares some of the same habitat but has smaller and rounder ears. Its total tail length is 190–235 mm, tail length is 102–143 mm, and weight is 18-29 g.

== Diet ==
The California pocket mouse is mainly a granivore, feeding mainly on seeds. However, it also eats insects and leaves. Like all members of the Family Heteromyidae, C. californicus has external cheek pouches which it uses to store seeds.

== See also ==
- California chaparral and woodlands
- Fauna of the California chaparral and woodlands
