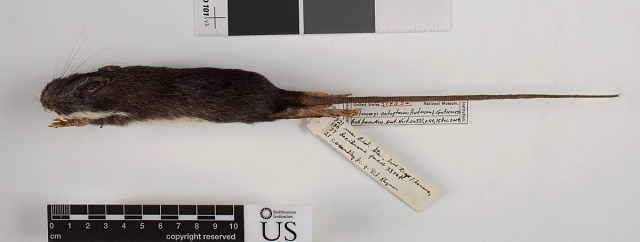

Conservation status
- Least Concern (IUCN 3.1)

Scientific classification
- Kingdom: Animalia
- Phylum: Chordata
- Class: Mammalia
- Infraclass: Placentalia
- Order: Rodentia
- Family: Heteromyidae
- Genus: Heteromys
- Species: H. catopterius

Binomial name
- Heteromys catopterius Anderson & Gutiérrez, 2009

= Overlook spiny pocket mouse =

Species of rodent

The overlook spiny pocket mouse (Heteromys catopterius) is a species of heteromyid rodent endemic to Venezuela.
