= Ecuadoran spiny pocket mouse =

Conservation status
- Vulnerable (IUCN 3.1)

Scientific classification
- Kingdom: Animalia
- Phylum: Chordata
- Class: Mammalia
- Order: Rodentia
- Family: Heteromyidae
- Genus: Heteromys
- Species: H. teleus

Binomial name
- Heteromys teleus Anderson & Jarrín, 2002

Species of rodent

The Ecuadoran spiny pocket mouse (Heteromys teleus) is a species of rodent in the family Heteromyidae. It is endemic to central western Ecuador, where it is found at elevations from sea level to 2000 m on the coastal plain and western slopes of the Andes. The species is nocturnal and lives in dry tropical evergreen forests of the southernmost extension of the Choco; it creates well-defined runways, and is often found near streams. It is threatened by deforestation and fragmentation of its remaining habitat.
