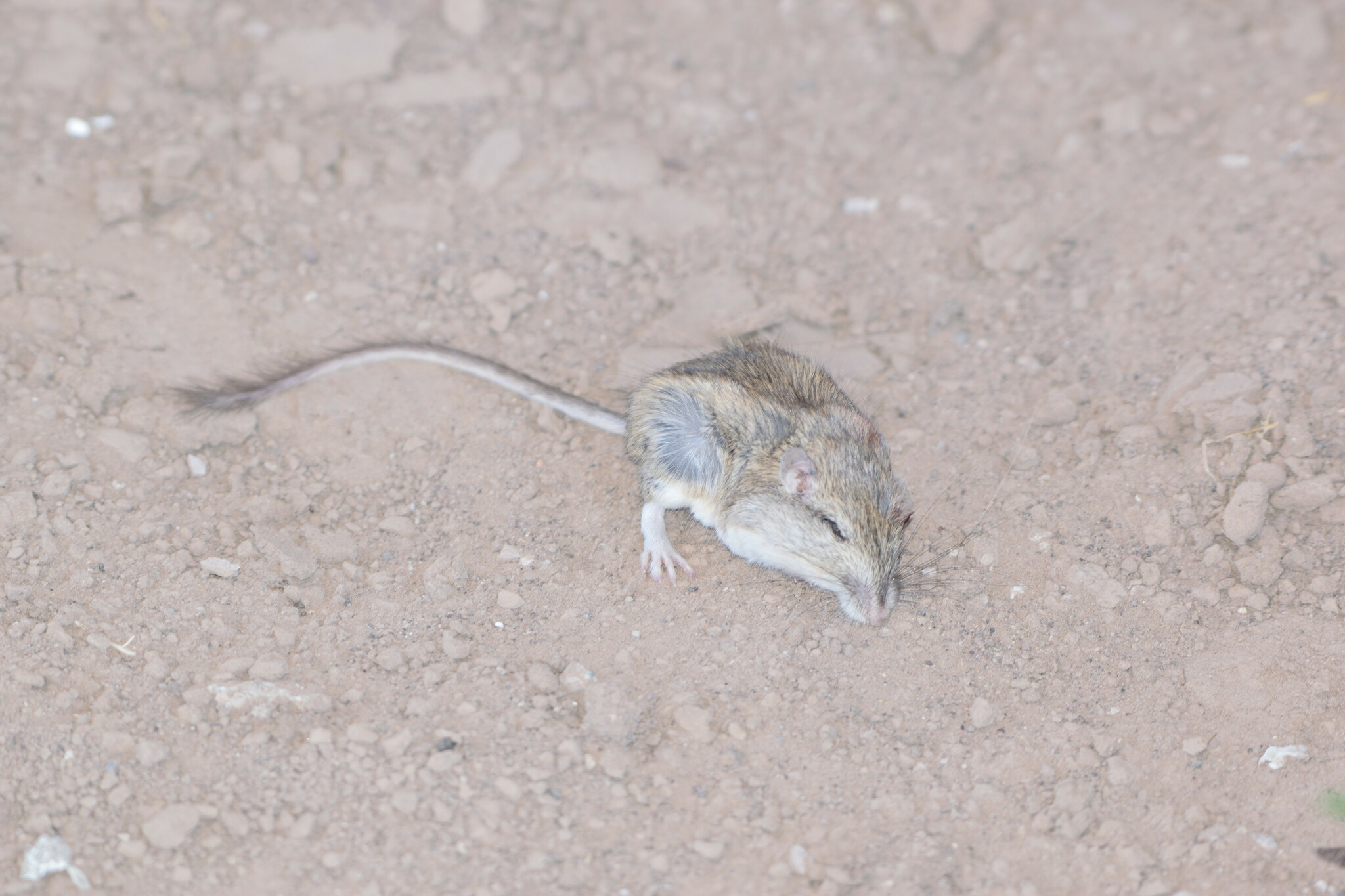

Conservation status
- Least Concern (IUCN 3.1)

- Secure (NatureServe)

Scientific classification
- Kingdom: Animalia
- Phylum: Chordata
- Class: Mammalia
- Order: Rodentia
- Family: Heteromyidae
- Genus: Chaetodipus
- Species: C. rudinoris

Binomial name
- Chaetodipus rudinoris (Elliot, 1903)

= Baja pocket mouse =

Species of rodent

The Baja pocket mouse (Chaetodipus rudinoris) is a species of rodent in the family Heteromyidae. The species occurs in southern California, Baja California and on islands in the Gulf of California.

== Subspecies ==
The Baja pocket mouse has six recognised subspecies. The Montserrat Island pocket mouse (Chaetodipus rudinoris fornicatus) became extinct in 1975 (last sighting).

- Chaetodipus rudinoris rudinoris
- Chaetodipus rudinoris extimus
- †Chaetodipus rudinoris fornicatus (Monserrat Island pocket mouse)
- Chaetodipus rudinoris hueyi
- Chaetodipus rudinoris knekus
- Chaetodipus rudinoris mesidios
