= Long-tailed pocket mouse =

Conservation status
- Least Concern (IUCN 3.1)

Scientific classification
- Kingdom: Animalia
- Phylum: Chordata
- Class: Mammalia
- Order: Rodentia
- Family: Heteromyidae
- Genus: Chaetodipus
- Species: C. formosus

Binomial name
- Chaetodipus formosus (Merriam, 1889)

Species of rodent

The long-tailed pocket mouse (Chaetodipus formosus) is a species of rodent in the family Heteromyidae. It is found in Arizona, California, Nevada and Utah in the United States and Baja California in Mexico.

A long-tailed pocket mouse on Mt. Charleston, Nevada.
