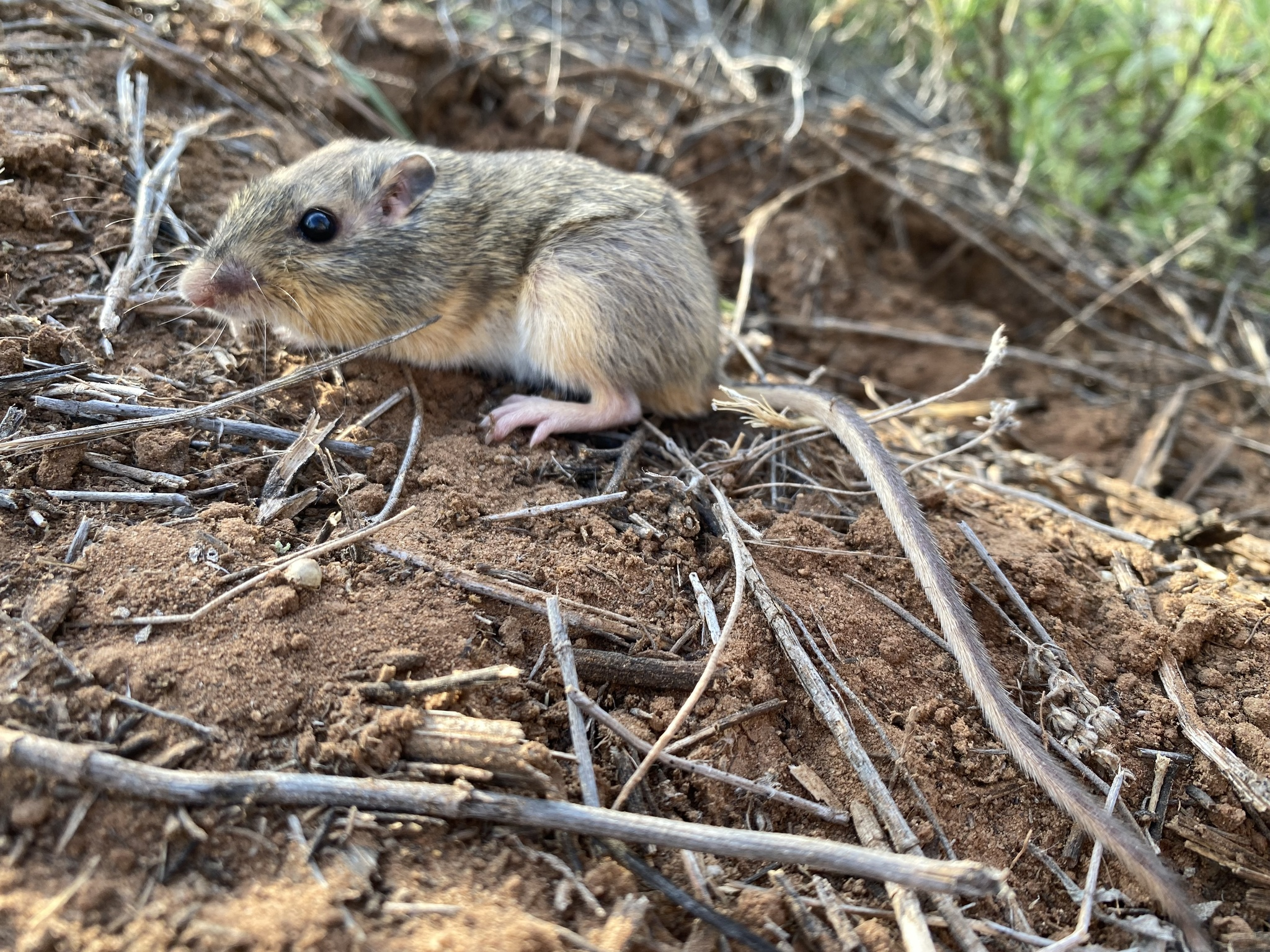

Conservation status
- Least Concern (IUCN 3.1)

Scientific classification
- Kingdom: Animalia
- Phylum: Chordata
- Class: Mammalia
- Order: Rodentia
- Family: Heteromyidae
- Genus: Chaetodipus
- Species: C. hispidus

Binomial name
- Chaetodipus hispidus (Baird, 1858)

= Hispid pocket mouse =

Species of rodent

The hispid pocket mouse (Chaetodipus hispidus) is a large pocket mouse native to the Great Plains region of North America. It is a member of the genus Chaetodipus.

== Distribution ==
The hispid pocket mouse occurs across the Great Plains from southern North Dakota to central Mexico, and west from the Missouri River to the foot of the Rocky Mountains. It is not found in far-eastern portions of the states Kansas or Missouri.

== Description ==
This mouse is one of the largest pocket mice. Its pelage is bristley (hispidus means "bristley"), yellowish with black hairs interspersed above. It has a distinct, buffy lateral line and white underparts.

Biological statistics (adult)
Length	190–237 mm
Tail	90–115 mm
Hind foot	23–30 mm
Ear	12–14 mm
Weight	35–60 g

== Subspecies ==
There are four recognized subspecies:

- Chaetodipus hispidus hispidus Baird, 1858:421. Type locality "Charco Escondido (Tamaulipas), Mexico, (24 leagues W. of Matamoros.)"
- Chaetodipus hispidus paradoxus Merriam, 1889:24. Type locality "Trego County, Kansas." (latirostris Rhodes, conditi Allen are synonyms.)
- Chaetodipus hispidus spilotus Merriam, 1889:25. Type locality "Gainesville, Cook (Cooke) County, Texas." (maximus Elliot is a synonym).
- Chaetodipus hispidus zacatecae Osgood, 1900:45. Type locality "Valparaiso, Zacatecas, Mexico."

== Behavior and habitat ==
Hispid pocket mice inhabit a variety of upland habitats, but are most abundant in areas with sandy soils and patches of bare ground. They are also found in areas with rocky, loamy soils. Hispid pocket mice are not found in rocky prairie, and seem to avoid sand dunes and riparian zones. These mice prefer a vegetation mix of short- to mid-grasses, shrubs, forbs, cacti and/or yucca.

Essentially granivores, the diet of the hispid pocket mouse consists primarily of seeds it selectively gathers, though these mice do consume some insects and leaves.

Burrows are always dug in friable soil and have two to three entrances, often plugged. Unlike other pocket mice the hispid pocket mouse often leaves a conspicuous mound of earth about the burrow entrance (like the mounds of pocket gophers, but significantly smaller).

Hispid pocket mice are solitary.

== Reproduction ==
Not much is known about the reproduction of this species. Adult males have been recorded with enlarged testes from March through October, and pregnant females have been trapped in July and August. The length of the breeding season suggests females can bear two or more litters a year.
