= Lined pocket mouse =

Conservation status
- Data Deficient (IUCN 3.1)

Scientific classification
- Kingdom: Animalia
- Phylum: Chordata
- Class: Mammalia
- Order: Rodentia
- Family: Heteromyidae
- Genus: Chaetodipus
- Species: C. lineatus

Binomial name
- Chaetodipus lineatus (Dalquest, 1951)

Species of rodent

The lined pocket mouse (Chaetodipus lineatus) is a species of rodent in the family Heteromyidae. This pocket mouse is endemic to a small area of central Mexico.

== Description ==
The lined pocket mouse is smaller than most pocket mice in the genus Chaetodipus, averaging 165 mm (6.5 in) in total length including a tail of 92 mm (3.6 in). It resembles Nelson's pocket mouse (Chaetodipus nelsonii) in size and general appearance but lacks the stiff spines that that species has among the hairs on its rump. Its coloring is also distinctive; the dorsal surface is gray faintly lined with buff giving a drab appearance, the sides are gray and the underparts are white, with a fine buff line delineating the margin between sides and belly.

== Distribution and habitat ==
The lined pocket mouse is found only in the states of San Luis Potosi and Zacatecas in central Mexico where it inhabits desert plains with xerophile scrub at altitudes between 1,600 and 2,400 metres (5,200 and 7,900 ft) above sea level.

== Behavior ==
The lined pocket mouse lives in a burrow and is nocturnal. The entrance of the burrow is usually at the base of a plant, in a crevice or in some other concealed location. When it emerges after dark, the pocket mouse moves slowly around staying under cover as much as possible. If it needs to cross an open space it moves much more rapidly. It feeds on seeds such as those of the prickly pear (Opuntia) which fall to the ground, but it does not eat the pulp of the cactus fruit.

== Status ==
The lined pocket mouse has a restricted range, is relatively uncommon and its population trend is unknown. The International Union for Conservation of Nature is unable to assess its conservation status and lists it as "data deficient".
