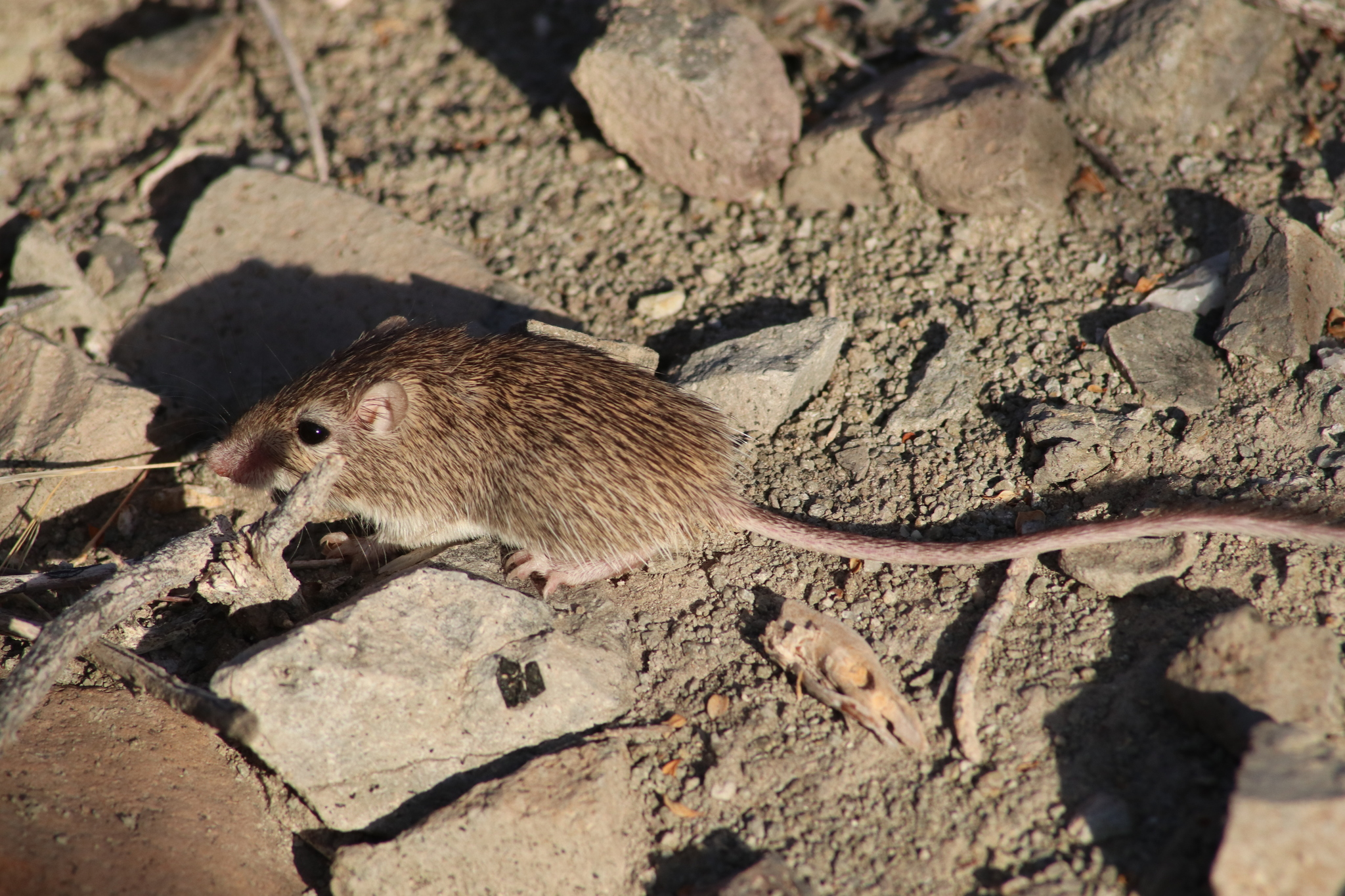

Conservation status
- Least Concern (IUCN 3.1)

Scientific classification
- Kingdom: Animalia
- Phylum: Chordata
- Class: Mammalia
- Order: Rodentia
- Family: Heteromyidae
- Genus: Chaetodipus
- Species: C. arenarius

Binomial name
- Chaetodipus arenarius (Merriam, 1894)

= Little desert pocket mouse =

Species of rodent

The little desert pocket mouse (Chaetodipus arenarius) is a species of small rodent in the family Heteromyidae. It is endemic to the Baja California peninsula of Mexico.

== Description ==
The little desert pocket mouse reaches a length of about 154 mm (6.1 in) including a tail of 86 mm (3.4 in), with males being slightly larger than females. The fur is soft and fairly silky, with none of the spines found in some related species, although there may be a few soft bristles on the rump. The ears are dark, featuring a tiny patch of white hairs at their base. The color of the dorsal surface ranges from pale gray or pale buff to dark brown, and some may have dark-tipped guard hairs that create a grizzled appearance. The upper half of the tail matches the dorsal color, while the underparts of the body, the feet, and the lower side of the tail are white or cream-colored. There may be a buff-colored line separating the upper parts from the underparts, but this line is faint or absent in some populations.

== Distribution and habitat ==
The little desert pocket mouse is endemic to Mexico. Its range includes the Baja California peninsula, Jacques Cousteau Island and Magdalena Island. Its typical habitat is arid flat areas with scant vegetation and loose, dry, sandy soils but it is also found on slopes and ridges, and even the floors of dried-up riverbeds.

== Ecology ==
Very little is known about the natural history and behavior of this pocket mouse. It lives in a burrow and seems to have an affinity for sandy soils. Its breeding habits are not known but a female specimen containing two embryos was caught in March. Its main predator is the American barn owl (Tyto alba).

== Status ==
Although the population trend of the little desert pocket mouse has not been evaluated, it is common in suitable habitat within its range and does not appear to face any specific threat. In view of this and its presumed large total population, the International Union for Conservation of Nature has assessed its conservation status as being of "least concern".
