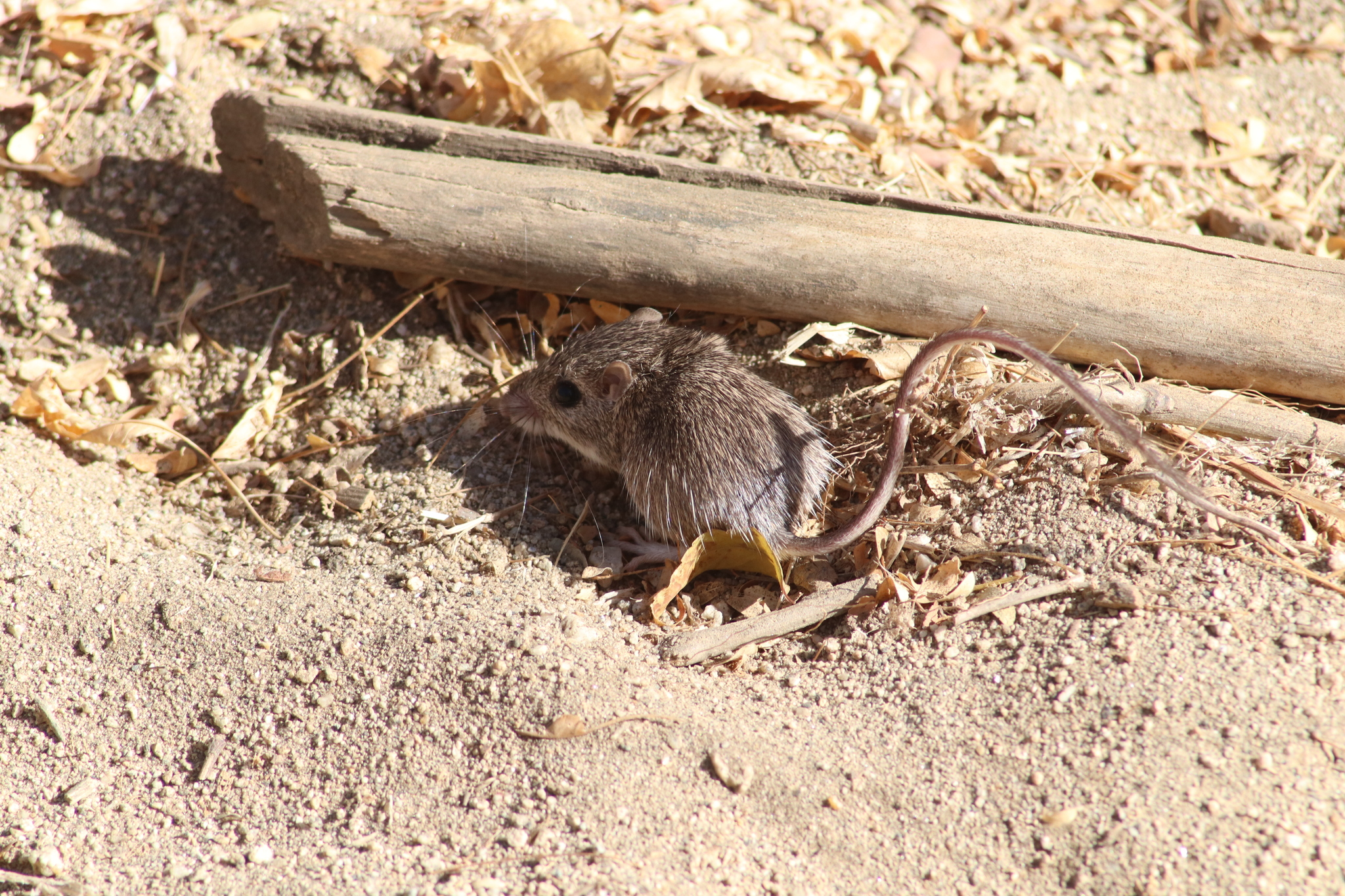

Conservation status
- Vulnerable (IUCN 3.1)

Scientific classification
- Kingdom: Animalia
- Phylum: Chordata
- Class: Mammalia
- Order: Rodentia
- Family: Heteromyidae
- Genus: Chaetodipus
- Species: C. dalquesti

Binomial name
- Chaetodipus dalquesti (Roth, 1976)

= Dalquest's pocket mouse =

Species of rodent

Dalquest's pocket mouse (Chaetodipus dalquesti) is a species of rodent in the family Heteromyidae, although it is now generally treated as a subspecies of Chaetodipus ammophilus. It is endemic to Mexico. The pocket mouse is named after Walter W. Dalquest (1917-2000), an American zoologist associated with the American Museum of Natural History and Harvard's Museum of Comparative Zoology.
