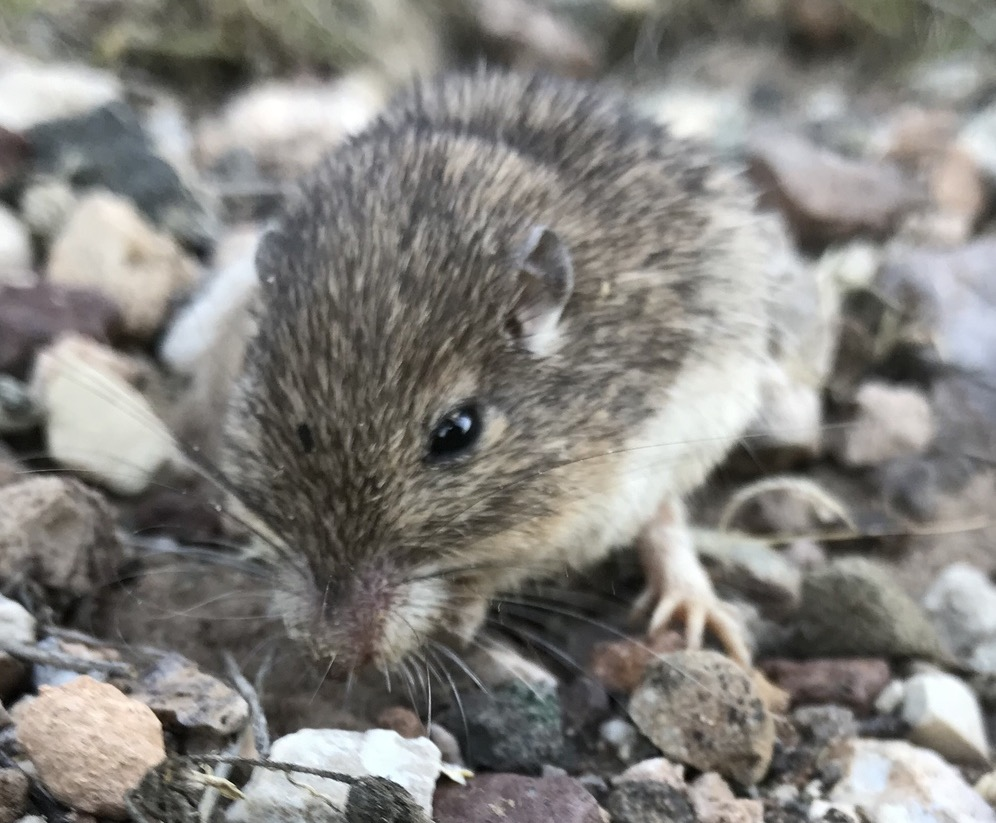

Conservation status
- Least Concern (IUCN 3.1)

Scientific classification
- Kingdom: Animalia
- Phylum: Chordata
- Class: Mammalia
- Order: Rodentia
- Family: Heteromyidae
- Genus: Chaetodipus
- Species: C. nelsoni

Binomial name
- Chaetodipus nelsoni (Merriam, 1894)

= Nelson's pocket mouse =

Species of rodent

Nelson's pocket mouse (Chaetodipus nelsoni) is a species of rodent in the family Heteromyidae. It is found in Mexico and in New Mexico and Texas in United States. It is named in honor of the American naturalist Edward William Nelson.

== Description ==
Nelson's pocket mouse is a medium-sized, long-tailed pocket mouse growing to a total length of 180 mm (7.1 in) including a tail of 102 mm (4.0 in). The external cheek pouches are lined with fur, the ears are small and oval in shape and the body is slender. The front feet are small while the hind feet are larger, and the fur on the rump contains numerous dark-tipped, grooved spines. The color of the back and sides is brown, the hairs having a dark gray base, a grayish-fawn centre and black tips. There is a pale area round the eye. The underparts are whitish with a narrow fawn line separating the color zones. The tail has sparse hairs on the front half and a crest of hairs on the back half which has a tufted tip. It closely resembles the lined pocket mouse (Chaetodipus lineatus) but that species lacks the stiff spines on the rump.

== Distribution and habitat ==
Nelson's pocket mouse is endemic to western Texas, south eastern New Mexico and central and northern Mexico. It is present in the Lower Sonoran life zone at altitudes up to about 2,025 m (6,644 ft), the actual maximum limit being the lower boundary of the pine-oak-juniper woodlands. Its typical habitat is desert with sparse, scrubby vegetation. It is found on rocky slopes where cactus, creosote bush. desert spoon and Agave lechuguilla grow, on sandy flat areas, in rock piles, in old walls, around old buildings and in bare overgrazed pasture. It is the most common pocket mouse in most of its range. There are two subspecies, C. n. canescens from the northern half of the range and C. n. nelsoni from the southern half.

== Behavior ==
Nelson's pocket mouse is a nocturnal species and does not hibernate in winter. It excavates a shallow burrow with several openings in which it spends the day and rears its young. After nightfall it emerges to forage, tending to move from the base of one plant to another, seldom staying long on open ground and running (rather than hopping) only when startled. It feeds mostly on seeds which it gathers and packs into its cheek pouches. It also consumes other parts of plants and may also eat insects. It breeds in spring and summer when litters of about three young are born after a gestation period of about thirty days.

== Status ==
The population of Nelson's pocket mouse varies with the seasons. It is quite abundant in late summer but numbers have dwindled by the following spring as only about 14% of individuals live to be one year old. There are several national parks or other protected areas within its distribution range and no particular threats have been identified, so the IUCN has assessed this pocket mouse as being of "least concern".
