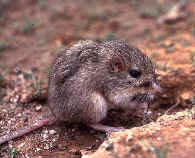

Conservation status
- Least Concern (IUCN 3.1)

- Secure (NatureServe)

Scientific classification
- Kingdom: Animalia
- Phylum: Chordata
- Class: Mammalia
- Order: Rodentia
- Family: Heteromyidae
- Genus: Chaetodipus
- Species: C. penicillatus

Binomial name
- Chaetodipus penicillatus (Woodhouse, 1852)

= Desert pocket mouse =

Species of rodent

The desert pocket mouse (Chaetodipus penicillatus) is a North American species of heteromyid rodent found in the southwestern United States and Mexico. True to its common name, the medium-sized desert pocket mouse prefers sandy, sparsely vegetated desert environments.

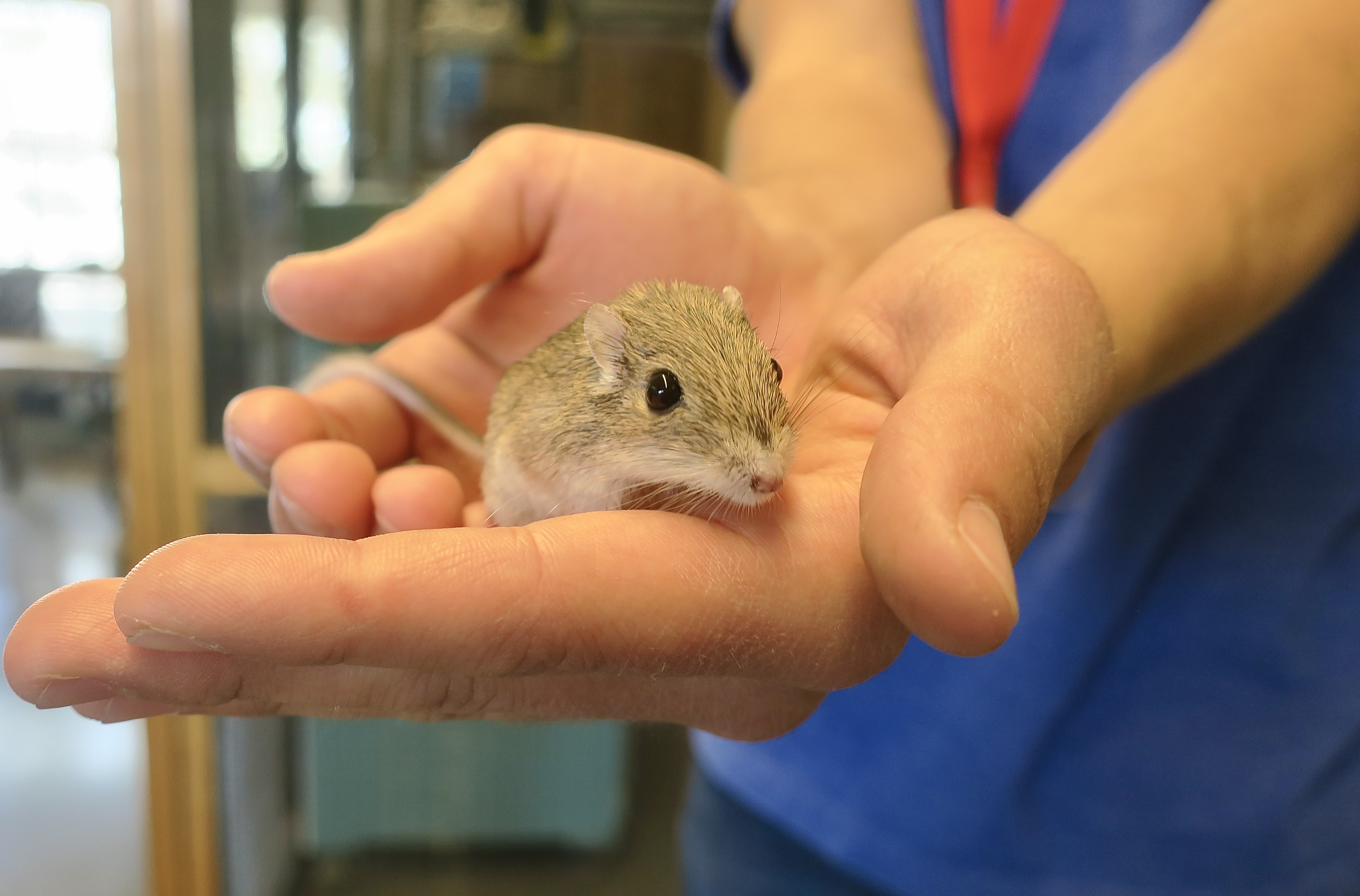
A desert pocket mouse being handled at Liberty Wildlife Center, AZ.

== Description ==
Chaetodipus penicillatus is a medium-sized pocket mouse. The total length of adults usually does not exceed 180 mm. Coloration is grayish brown to yellowish gray and may be sprinkled with black. The pelage is coarse. This species lacks rump spines but has numerous, elongate rump hairs which are darker dorsally and lighter laterally. There is no lateral line. The underparts of the body and tail are whitish. The tail is heavily crested and is longer than the head and body, with average tail length being 109 mm. The soles of the hind feet are whitish and average hind foot length is 25 mm.

== Geographic range and habitat ==
Chaetodipus penicillatus occurs in the southwestern United States and northern Mexico. The northern limit of its range is southern Nevada. It extends southwest into California and the northern Baja Peninsula and northwestern Mexico. Eastward it stretches into the southwesternmost parts of Colorado. From southern Nevada and southwestern Colorado the range of C. penicillatus proceeds southeast into Arizona, through southern New Mexico and southwestern Texas, and into northeastern Mexico. The desert pocket mouse prefers various arid, open desert environments, usually where the vegetation is rather sparse. These may include desert wash, desert succulent shrub, desert scrub, and alkali desert scrub. It prefers soft alluvial, sandy, or silty soils along stream bottoms, desert washes, and valleys, rather than rocky terrain. These pocket mice live in soils that may be vegetated with creosote bush, palo verde, burroweed, mesquite, cholla and other cacti, and short, sparse grass, as well as in lower edges of alluvial fan with yucca, mesquite, grama, and prickly poppy.

Six subspecies are currently recognised:

- C. pencillatus pencillatus - south-central Arizona
- C. pencillatus angustirostris - southern California, eastern Baja California
- C. pencillatus pricei - southern Arizona, Sonora
- C. pencillatus seri - Tiburón Island
- C. pencillatus sobrinus - southern Nevada
- C. pencillatus stephensi - eastern California

== Behavior ==
Chaetodipus penicillatus may be active all year round in some areas, though it is inactive in the winter in southern Arizona. This species is mainly nocturnal. It is aggressively solitary, with a home range of less than 1 acre. Pocket mice can burrow into hard-crusted soils by actually physically chewing their way through the hard portions of the soil. Their burrows, however, are usually excavated in silty, sandy, or gravelly soil and are used for refuges, seed storage, and neonatal care. The average lifespan of C. penicillatus is around one year.

== Dietary habits ==
Chaetodipus penicillatus forages beneath a canopy of shrubs on sandy or gravely soils. It feeds primarily on seeds of forbs, grasses, and shrubs, although green vegetation and insects may supplement the diet. Seeds of mesquite, creosote bush, and broomweed have been found in the cheek pouches of desert pocket mice. Seeds are also stored in burrows and in dispersed caches throughout their territories. Although there is no direct evidence, this species probably acquires all of the water it needs from its food.

== Reproduction ==
The mouse's breeding season is in the spring; adult females can give birth to one or more litters of two to five young during the spring and summer. Gestation lasts on average of 23 days. Incisors appear 9 days after birth, eyes open on day 14, and ears open no sooner than day 14. Many young females reach sexual maturity early and became pregnant while still in their juvenile pelage. Population has a turnover rate as high as 95%.
