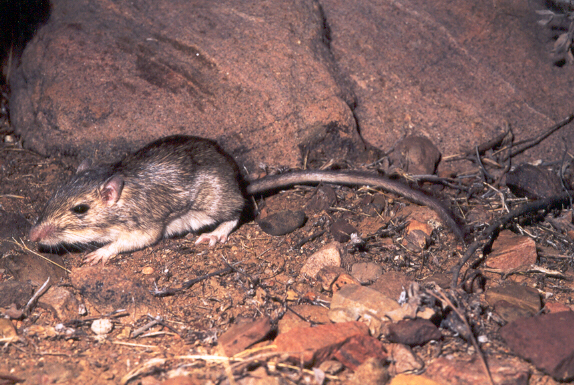

Conservation status
- Least Concern (IUCN 3.1)

- Secure (NatureServe)

Scientific classification
- Kingdom: Animalia
- Phylum: Chordata
- Class: Mammalia
- Order: Rodentia
- Family: Heteromyidae
- Genus: Chaetodipus
- Species: C. baileyi

Binomial name
- Chaetodipus baileyi (Merriam, 1894)

= Bailey's pocket mouse =

Species of rodent

Bailey's pocket mouse (Chaetodipus baileyi) is a species of rodent of the subfamily Perognathinae, family Heteromyidae. It is found in Baja California, Sinaloa and Sonora in Mexico and in California, Arizona and New Mexico in the United States.

== Description ==
Bailey's pocket mouse has an adult length of between 176 and 240 mm (6.9 and 9.4 in), males being larger than females. Males average 28.2 g (1.0 oz) while females average 24.5 g (0.86 oz).

== Taxonomy ==
Bailey's pocket mouse was first described by Clinton Hart Merriam in 1894 using a specimen collected by Vernon Bailey in Magdalena, Mexico on 3 November 1889.

== Ecology ==
This pocket mouse lives in a burrow and is nocturnal. When it ventures into the open to search for food it is cautious, remaining as far as possible under cover or in the shadow of plants. When the risk of predation by owls is high it tries to avoid crossing open ground between shrubs, especially on moonlit nights. Pocket mice feed on seeds which they carry in fur lined pouches on the outside of their cheeks, taking them back to their burrow for storage; this arrangement is advantageous to the mouse as it prevents the seeds from getting wet as would happen if they were carried in the mouth. Bailey's pocket mouse is the only known animal to be able to digest the wax found inside the jojoba nut and is the only rodent from the Sonoran Desert that is able to eat the seeds, because they are poisonous to most other mammals.

In the 1970s, researchers removed kangaroo rats from an ecosystem in the Chihuahuan Desert, and for many years, no other small rodents moved in to fill the niche they left. In 1995, twenty years after the experimental removal, Bailey's pocket mouse moved into the area and filled the gap, almost completely replacing the missing kangaroo rats.

== Status ==
Bailey's pocket mouse varies in abundance between about two and eighty animals per hectare, depending on the amount of rainfall and hence on its food supply. No particular threats to this species have been identified, and the International Union for Conservation of Nature has listed its conservation status as being of "least concern".
