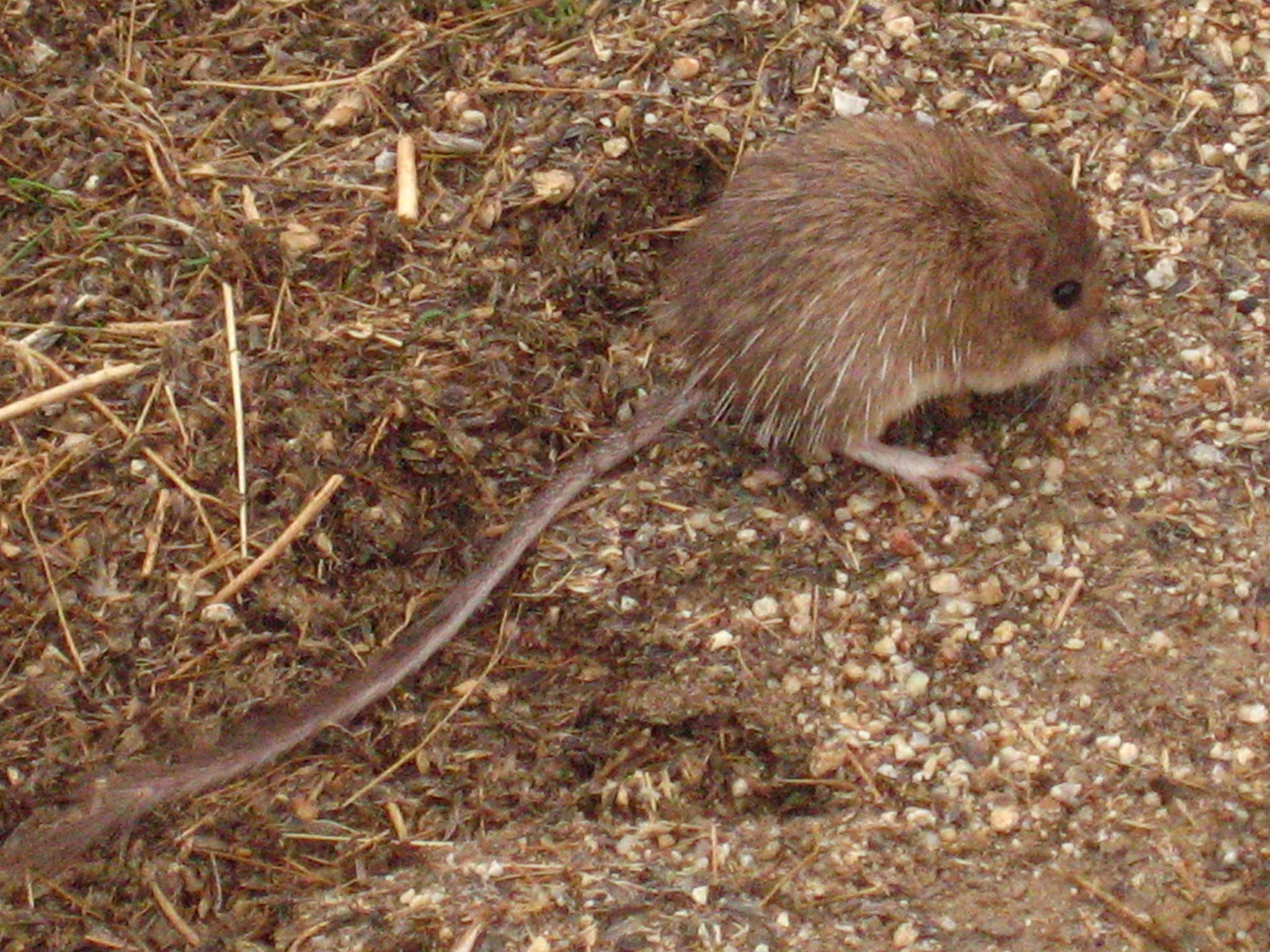
- In Riverside County, California, US

Conservation status
- Least Concern (IUCN 3.1)

Scientific classification
- Kingdom: Animalia
- Phylum: Chordata
- Class: Mammalia
- Order: Rodentia
- Family: Heteromyidae
- Genus: Chaetodipus
- Species: C. fallax

Binomial name
- Chaetodipus fallax (Merriam, 1889)

= San Diego pocket mouse =

Species of rodent

The San Diego pocket mouse (Chaetodipus fallax) is a rodent species in the family Heteromyidae. It occupies the northern region of Baja California near San Diego extending into Mexico.

== Description ==
The San Diego pocket mouse occupies the northern region of Baja California near San Diego extending into Mexico. This moderately sized mouse is characterized by dark brown fur covering the top of its body with white fur on its underside. Its length ranges from 170 to 200 mm and its weight is approximately 17–22 g. The San Diego pocket mouse is a homoeothermic endotherm with both hypsodont and lophodont teeth. Similar species include C. californicus, which shares the same habitat.

== Reproduction ==
The San Diego pocket mouse is often a solitary animal, which makes it difficult to study its reproductive history. Many individuals mate in the spring, but others have been known to mate throughout the year. Reproduction occurs 1–3 times a year. There is significant evidence that correlates reproductive events with rainfall. An average litter is composed of 2–6 individuals with an average gestation period of 24–26 days. Females serve as the primary caregivers for their offspring, nursing young and protecting them inside their burrows.

=== Lifespan ===
San Diego pocket mice have a lifespan ranging from four months to two years in the wild. Mortalities often result from predation, which increases in the spring when mice are actively foraging, reproducing and defending territories. In captive studies without predation, individuals have been known to live up to six years.

== Behavior ==
The San Diego pocket mouse is built for slow quadrupedal locomotion. At higher speeds, the pocket mouse "gallops" by hitting the ground with both feet and using its tail for balance. The mice forage at night in attempt to avoid predators. Food is gathered in cheek pouches and stored in separate burrow chambers. Burrows serve as the primary habitat for the mouse in the winter during a period of decreased activity. Burrows are divided into separate chambers with one for sleeping and the rest for storing food. Verbal communication may be utilized to indicate the presence of danger in some cases when a mouse squeaks. Large eyes and ears help individuals sense their surroundings.

== Home range ==
Males often occupy a home range of 3,500 square metres (38,000 sq ft) while females occupy a range of 2,500 square metres (27,000 sq ft). Territories are often defended to protect habitat from intruders with the exception of potential mates during the breeding season. A typical home range is composed of rocks, sand and herbaceous vegetation for cover. Some common plants seen in these habitats include Yucca and desert scrub.

== Diet ==
San Diego pocket mice are granivores and predominantly forage on seeds. Their cheeks have fur-lined pouches for storing seeds. These mice can subsist on seeds alone and are capable of surviving without drinking additional water. In this case, San Diego pocket mice are able to obtain their water through food or metabolic by-products. In high temperatures, San Diego pocket mice consume seeds with high moisture to compensate for evaporative cooling and water loss during warmer weather. If seeds are in short supply, individuals have been known to eat leaves, stems and insects to replace their normal diet.

== Predation ==
The San Diego pocket mouse is subject to predation by a variety of predators, including: foxes, coyotes, badgers, owls and snakes. To avoid predation, mice are characterized by a dark pelage that keeps them camouflaged while they are active at night. A varied hopping style deployed by the mice also makes it difficult for predators to catch the mice.

== Impact on the ecosystem ==
The San Diego pocket mouse has a significant impact on the ecosystem in its ability to aerate the soil through burrowing. The method in which the mice forage for seeds and store them in their cheek pouches is beneficial for seed dispersal in plants. San Diego pocket mice are also host to a number of ticks and fleas. They are also subject to competition with other rodents that share the same niche. Some rodents are able to coexist as rodents that require more moisture consume higher moisture seeds and leave drier seeds for rodents that require more moisture through drinking.

== Conservation status ==
On the ICUN Red List, the San Diego pocket mouse is classified as a species of least concern. The San Diego pocket mouse is under no immediate threat.
