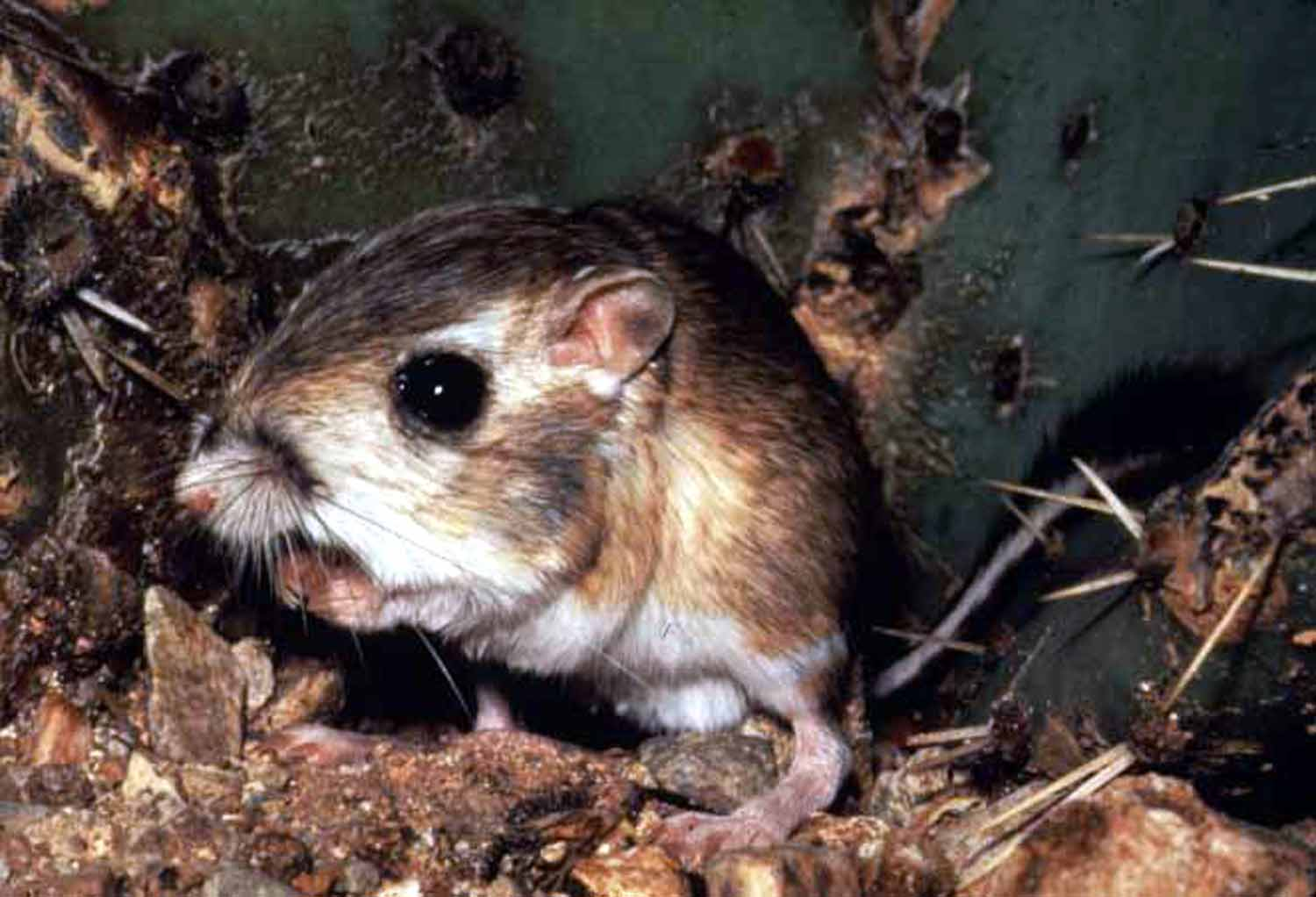
- Fresno kangaroo rat (Dipodomys nitratoides)

Scientific classification
- Kingdom: Animalia
- Phylum: Chordata
- Class: Mammalia
- Order: Rodentia
- Superfamily: Geomyoidea
- Family: Heteromyidae; Gray, 1868

Type genus
- Heteromys Desmarest, 1817

Subfamilies
- Dipodomyinae; Heteromyinae; Perognathinae
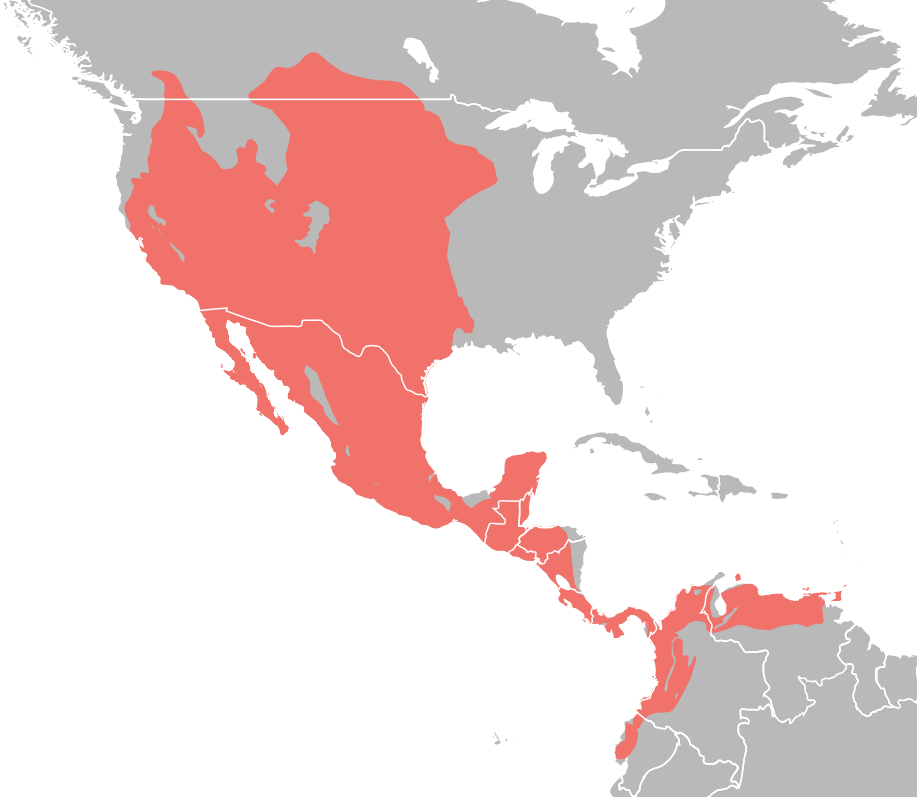
- Heteromyidae distribution

= Heteromyidae =

Heteromyids Temporal range: Early Miocene–Recent

Family of rodents

Heteromyidae is a family of rodents consisting of kangaroo rats, kangaroo mice, pocket mice and spiny pocket mice. Most heteromyids live in complex burrows within the deserts and grasslands of western North America, though species within the genus Heteromys are also found in forests and their range extends as far south as northern South America. They feed mostly on seeds and other plant parts, which they carry in their fur-lined cheek pouches to their burrows.

Although they are very different in physical appearance, the closest relatives of the heteromyids are pocket gophers in the family Geomyidae.

== Description ==
There are about fifty-nine members of the family Heteromyidae divided among six genera. They are all small rodents, the largest being the giant kangaroo rat (Dipodomys ingens) with a body length of 15 cm (6 in) and a tail a little longer than this. In many species the tail is tufted and is mainly used for balance. Other adaptations include partially fused vertebrae in the neck, short fore limbs and much enlarged bullae (bubble-shaped bones in the skull). The skulls vary widely across the group but they are all thin and papery and do not have the robust cranial crests and ridges found on the skulls of members of the family Geomyidae. The skull has other peculiarities. There is an extra hole that penetrates the rostrum, distinctive occluded teeth and the masseter muscle, which moves the lower jaw, is set far forward on the snout, an arrangement found in squirrels, beavers, pocket gophers, heteromyids and a few other groups. The dental formula is 1.0.1.31.0.1.3 × 2 = 20 teeth in total. In the kangaroo rats, the teeth continue to grow all the time, being worn away as the animal chews. The molars have two-lobed cusps. The upper incisors are grooved and the enamel on the molars is quickly worn away by chewing leaving the dentine exposed. In the kangaroo rats they are unrooted but in the pocket mice they have roots.

Fur-lined cheek pouches are a feature across the family Heteromyidae. They have openings near the mouth and extend backwards along the sides of the neck. The fur on the animal's body is in general short and fine and often matches in colour the soil of the region in which the animal lives, being some shade of buff, pale brown, reddish-brown or grey. The spiny pocket mice have coarser fur and spiky bristles on the back near the tail.

== Distribution ==
Heteromyids are endemic to the western United States, Mexico, Central America and northwestern South America. They are creatures of open country, mostly specialising in prairies, arid lands and desert fringes, but the spiny pocket mice are found in both wet and dry tropical forests in Central and northwestern South America. During the Oligocene, the extent of arid lands across the United States was greater than it is today and these animals occurred more widely. Fossils of kangaroo rats are known from the Pliocene.

== Behaviour ==
The kangaroo rats, kangaroo mice and pocket mice are adapted for life in deserts and other arid environments where they largely feed on dry seeds. Kangaroo rats have no need to drink because they are able to extract sufficient water from metabolising their food, obtaining half a gram of water from each gram of seeds eaten. They carry most of the seeds they find back to their burrows in exterior cheek folds lined with fur rather than in cheek pouches inside the mouth as do hamsters. This is because carrying the food in the mouth would involve wetting it and moisture needs to be conserved as much as possible in dry environments. Most species store the seeds they gather in special chambers in the burrow where they absorb moisture from the humid air. Others, such as Merriam's kangaroo rat, bury them in shallow caches in the open air.

It has been found that there is little hoarding done in the winter but that food is most commonly stored in the autumn and spring. Heteromyids use sight and olfactory clues to locate possible food and then use their fore-feet to manipulate objects. Kangaroo mice make greater use of clumped food where wind or water has concentrated seeds in shallow depressions or around rocks while pocket mice hunt around under vegetation or debris for individual food items. It has been found that pocket mice forage more efficiently than kangaroo rats and this is thought to be due to the fact that they handle their finds more and are better able to distinguish between food and non-food items.

These animals excavate long burrow systems with passages, chambers and multiple entrances. They are largely nocturnal, feeding and moving about at night and resting deep in their burrows during the day. Here it is cooler and more humid which conserves moisture and the animals may temporarily block the entrances to augment this. They are able to concentrate their urine to a viscous consistency which further reduces water loss. Under extreme conditions, some are able to aestivate in chambers under ground.

Kangaroo rats have large hind feet with long metatarsals and no first digits. With these they bound around not using their fore feet at all for locomotion. Pocket mice are smaller and can also move with leaps but they normally run around on four limbs. Members of the genus Heteromys, the spiny pocket mice, move around on all fours and do not leap at all.

== Ecology ==
Kangaroo rats and pocket mice form a part of the diet of many predatory creatures. They are eaten by foxes, coyotes, snakes and birds. They have acute hearing and can detect the approaching swoop of an owl or the movements of a snake. Many can leap to avoid the predators as they seek the safety of their burrows. The largest kangaroo rats can leap 2.75 metres (9 ft) in a single bound.

In the Sonoran Desert there are many closely related species of heteromyid mice and rats. Each has its own niche in the environment which means that they do not unnecessarily compete with each other for the limited available resources. Bailey's pocket mouse climbs into plants and bushes in order to find seeds and berries still attached to the plant. It is the only species able to eat the wax found inside the seeds of the jojoba plant. Merriam's kangaroo rat primarily moves rapidly from one bush to another gathering seed but overlooking anything lying on the desert floor. The desert pocket mouse forages across the open desert floor and gathers seeds that have fallen to the ground.

== Taxonomy ==
- Family Heteromyidae
  - Subfamily Heteromyinae — spiny pocket mice
    - Genus Heteromys
      - Panamanian spiny pocket mouse, Heteromys adspersus
      - Trinidad spiny pocket mouse, Heteromys anomalus
      - Southern spiny pocket mouse, Heteromys australis
      - Overlook spiny pocket mouse, Heteromys catopterius
      - Desmarest's spiny pocket mouse, Heteromys desmarestianus
      - Gaumer's spiny pocket mouse, Heteromys gaumeri
      - Goldman's spiny pocket mouse, Heteromys goldmani
      - Mexican spiny pocket mouse, Heteromys irroratus
      - Nelson's spiny pocket mouse, Heteromys nelsoni
      - Cloud-dwelling spiny pocket mouse, Heteromys nubicolens
      - Paraguaná spiny pocket mouse, Heteromys oasicus
      - Mountain spiny pocket mouse, Heteromys oresterus
      - Painted spiny pocket mouse, Heteromys pictus
      - Salvin's spiny pocket mouse, Heteromys salvini
      - Jaliscan spiny pocket mouse, Heteromys spectabilis
      - Ecuadoran spiny pocket mouse, Heteromys teleus
  - Subfamily Dipodomyinae — kangaroo rats and mice
    - Genus Dipodomys — kangaroo rats
      - Agile kangaroo rat, Dipodomys agilis
      - California kangaroo rat, Dipodomys californicus
      - Gulf Coast kangaroo rat, Dipodomys compactus
      - Desert kangaroo rat, Dipodomys deserti
      - Texas kangaroo rat, Dipodomys elator
      - San Quintin kangaroo rat, Dipodomys gravipes
      - Heermann's kangaroo rat, Dipodomys heermanni
      - Giant kangaroo rat, Dipodomys ingens
      - Merriam's kangaroo rat, Dipodomys merriami
      - Chisel-toothed kangaroo rat, Dipodomys microps
      - Nelson's kangaroo rat, Dipodomys nelsoni
      - Fresno kangaroo rat, Dipodomys nitratoides
      - Ord's kangaroo rat, Dipodomys ordii
      - Panamint kangaroo rat, Dipodomys panamintinus
      - Phillips's kangaroo rat, Dipodomys phillipsii
      - Dulzura kangaroo rat, Dipodomys simulans
      - Banner-tailed kangaroo rat, Dipodomys spectabilis
      - Stephens's kangaroo rat, Dipodomys stephensi
      - Narrow-faced kangaroo rat, Dipodomys venustus
    - Genus Microdipodops — kangaroo mice
      - Pale kangaroo mouse, Microdipodops pallidus
      - Dark kangaroo mouse, Microdipodops megacephalus
  - Subfamily Perognathinae — pocket mice
    - Genus Perognathus
      - White-eared pocket mouse, Perognathus alticola
      - Arizona pocket mouse, Perognathus amplus
      - Olive-backed pocket mouse, Perognathus fasciatus
      - Plains pocket mouse, Perognathus flavescens
      - Silky pocket mouse, Perognathus flavus
      - San Joaquin pocket mouse, Perognathus inornatus
      - Little pocket mouse, Perognathus longimembris
      - Merriam's pocket mouse, Perognathus merriami
      - Great Basin pocket mouse, Perognathus parvus
    - Genus Chaetodipus
      - Little desert pocket mouse, Chaetodipus arenarius
      - Narrow-skulled pocket mouse, Chaetodipus artus
      - Bailey's pocket mouse, Chaetodipus baileyi
      - California pocket mouse, Chaetodipus californicus
      - Dalquest's pocket mouse, Chaetodipus dalquesti
      - Chihuahuan pocket mouse, Chaetodipus eremicus
      - San Diego pocket mouse, Chaetodipus fallax
      - Long-tailed pocket mouse, Chaetodipus formosus
      - Goldman's pocket mouse, Chaetodipus goldmani
      - Hispid pocket mouse, Chaetodipus hispidus
      - Rock pocket mouse, Chaetodipus intermedius
      - Lined pocket mouse, Chaetodipus lineatus
      - Nelson's pocket mouse, Chaetodipus nelsoni
      - Desert pocket mouse, Chaetodipus penicillatus
      - Sinaloan pocket mouse, Chaetodipus pernix
      - Baja pocket mouse, Chaetodipus rudinoris
      - Spiny pocket mouse, Chaetodipus spinatus

Hafner et al. (2007) summarized the molecular and morphological data to date and proposed the following taxonomy:

- Heteromyidae
  - Dipodomyinae
    - Dipodomys
    - Microdipodops
  - - Heteromys
    - Perognathinae
      - Perognathus
      - Chaetodipus

Finding that the formerly recognized genus Liomys is paraphyletic, they subsumed it into Heteromys. Most authorities prior to this (Alexander and Riddle, 2005; Patton, 2005) treated Liomys as a separate genus.
