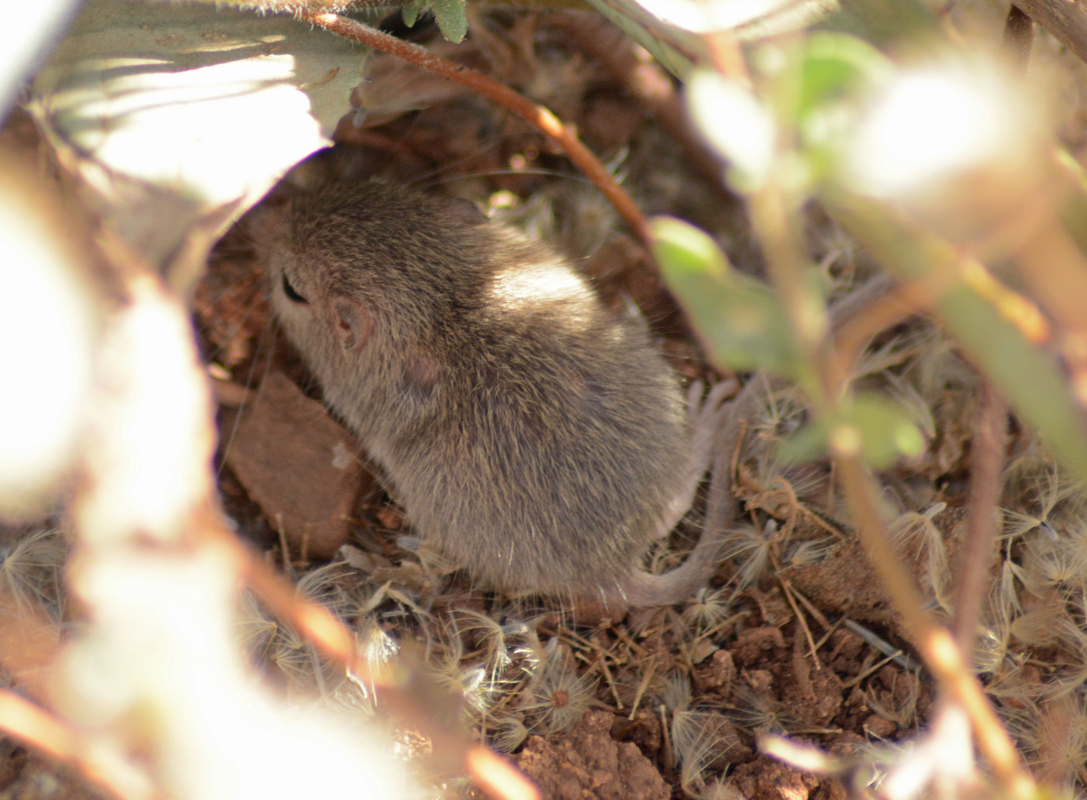

Conservation status
- Least Concern (IUCN 3.1)

Scientific classification
- Kingdom: Animalia
- Phylum: Chordata
- Class: Mammalia
- Order: Rodentia
- Family: Heteromyidae
- Genus: Chaetodipus
- Species: C. pernix

Binomial name
- Chaetodipus pernix (J. A. Allen, 1898)

= Sinaloan pocket mouse =

Species of rodent

The Sinaloan pocket mouse (Chaetodipus pernix) is one of 17 species of pocket mice in the genus Chaetodipus. Two subspecies of C. pernix are recognized, C. p. pernix and C. p. rostratus, all are endemic to Mexico.

This small mouse lives among shrubs and has a wide range of coat colors.

== Range and habitat ==
State of Sinaloa in Mexico

C. pernix mostly lives in the coastal plain of Sinaloa state within Mexico, which extends from southern Sonora to northern Nayarit. Their habitat consists mostly of small trees, shrubs, and cacti. Sinaloan pocket mice are found on sandy soil, living under low bushes or dense networks of vines and grasses. Their habitat does not contain any rock material, unlike in its sister species, the rock pocket mouse.

== Description ==
The Sinaloan pocket mouse is one of the smallest in the genus Chaetodipus with a total length of less than 200mm. Their skull is narrow with an elongated nose and medium-sized ears. C. pernix has a thinly haired tail that is longer than the body length. Their coat color is variable (usually yellowish-brown), but always darker on the back and lighter on the sides and belly. Their diet consists of grains and seeds. The average litter size is seven.

Color polymorphism

Coat color is a genetic polymorphism. Many different coat colors are seen between species of pocket mice and even within the same population because of differences in their genotype. Multiple aspects of the environment put selective pressures on pocket mice to adapt their coat colors. Variation in coat color between pocket mice can be a selective advantage for two main reasons: concealment and regulation of physiological processes.

Concealment offers a large selective advantage for pocket mice that are able to successfully hide from potential predators, also known as Crypsis. Pocket mice generally show two forms of crypsis: camouflage and countershading. Camouflage is seen when an organism's coloring helps it blend into its background or environment. Evidence of camouflage is seen between different populations of pocket mice that live in two different environments. The Sinaloan pocket mouse usually has a yellow-brown coat with black hairs because they live in a sandy environment under shrubs, while the Rock pocket mouse usually has a grey or black coat color and lives among rocks. Mice who show a very different coat color than their environment are more susceptible to predation because they can be seen easier than mice that blend in with their environment. Countershading is another type of camouflage and is seen when an organism's pigmentation is darker on the upper side of the body and lighter on the underside of the body. Sinaloan pocket mice almost always have a lighter belly and sides compared to the darker color of their back. The selective advantage of this color patterning is again, concealment from predators, mostly owls in this case. Countershading helps the pocket mouse to reduce the appearance of their shadow in sunny environments. Living in the sunny desert, this color pattern has a large selective advantage. Mice whose shadows were easily seen by owls flying overhead would more likely become prey, than mice whose shadows weren't as obvious.

Coat color in pocket mice can also be a selective advantage because it can help regulate physiological processes of the body. Light coat colors have a selective advantage in hot, sunny environments because they can help regulate body temperature. A dark coat in a sunny environment would attract sunlight and cause the mouse to overheat more easily, requiring more energy from the mouse to try and lower their body temperature. A light coat color requires less energy input to regulate body temperature and therefore has a selective advantage over dark coat color which requires more energy.

The selective advantage of coat color for concealment and regulation of body temperature likely caused geographic variation of coat color as well. For both concealment and body temperature regulation, the mice better adapted to their environment will likely survive better and produce more offspring. This means that the mouse that blends in with its environment the best, in a way that uses the least amount of energy will have a selective advantage. Going along with this, mice in different environments require different coat colors to blend in most effectively. Geographic variation between environments is another selective pressure that helped color polymorphism evolve between pocket mice. Pocket mice that live in sunny environments with an abundance of sand will have a selective advantage with light colored yellow or brown coats. In contrast, pocket mice that live on rocks in environments with less sun are more likely to have a selective advantage with darker colored grey or black coats.

Genetic basis

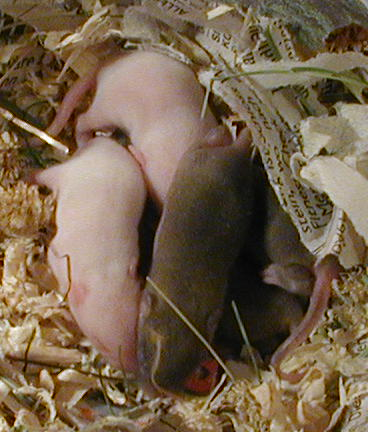
9 day old mice show variation in coat color because of differences in genotype.

The genetic difference for varying coat colors is controlled largely by two proteins in pocket mice: eumelanin and pheomelanin. Production of eumelanin gives hair a black or brown color, while pheomelanin gives hair a red color. Melanocytes are pigment producing cells, which are controlled by genes. Differences in gene expression cause melanocytes to produce varying levels and types of pigment.

Eumelanin is produced when the G protein-coupled receptor called melanocortin-1-receptor (MC1R) is activated. Pheomelanin production is controlled by the agouti-signaling protein, which is an inverse agonist of MC1R. Therefore, Agouti expression causes decreased levels of eumelanin production, which allows increased levels of pheomelanin expression. Variation in the environment can cause proteins to be expressed differently in the genome, producing variation in coat color between two different environments.
