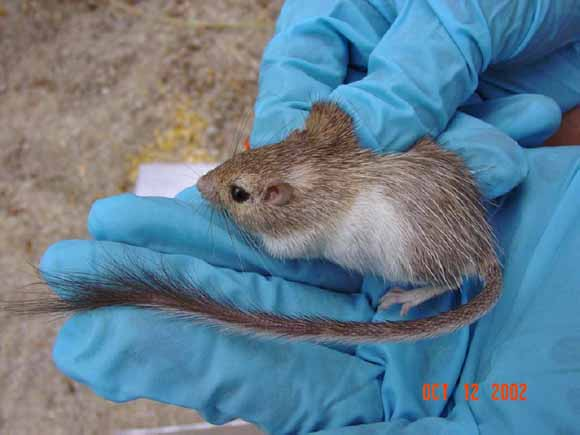

Conservation status
- Least Concern (IUCN 3.1)

Scientific classification
- Kingdom: Animalia
- Phylum: Chordata
- Class: Mammalia
- Order: Rodentia
- Family: Heteromyidae
- Genus: Chaetodipus
- Species: C. spinatus

Binomial name
- Chaetodipus spinatus (Merriam, 1889)

Synonyms
- Perognathus spinatus

= Spiny pocket mouse =

Species of rodent

The spiny pocket mouse (Chaetodipus spinatus) is a species of rodent in the family Heteromyidae and order Rodentia. It is found in Baja California in Mexico and in Arizona, California, and Nevada.

== Description ==
The spiny pocket mouse is characterized by long, flexible hairs and spines on its back which differentiate it from pocket mice in other genera. Their ears are small and round. They have long tails that are 126% of the length of their head and body. Their coat colors vary among islands but are generally brown on the tops of their bodies and tan on their sides. A spiny pocket mouse weighs about 13–18 g (0.46–0.63 oz). Their body length ranges from 164 to 225 mm (6.5 to 8.9 in).

== Distribution and habitat ==
Spiny pocket mice are found in Southern Nevada, and in the islands of the Gulf of California at elevations up to 900 m (3,000 ft). They also range from southeast California to the south by the cape of Baja California Peninsula (Mexico), where they are native. Because of its wide distribution and absence in agricultural areas, the spiny pocket mouse population faces little risk of extinction.

== Diet ==
This mouse's diet varies according to the habitat it lives in. Their diet probably consists of seeds and green vegetation at times of rainfall. Since water is scarce in its habitat, it likely obtains most of its water from food.

== Ecology ==
The spiny pocket mouse is nocturnal, allowing it to live in rough, rocky desert landscapes by taking refuge during the hot days. "They sleep, breed, and raise their young in burrows." Their main predator are feral cats.
