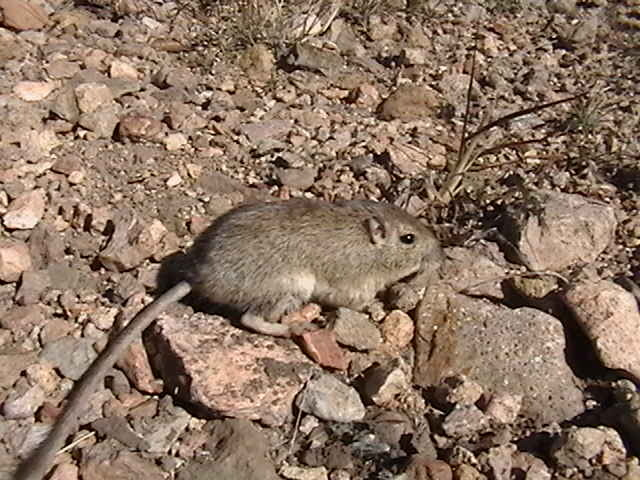

Conservation status
- Least Concern (IUCN 3.1)

Scientific classification
- Kingdom: Animalia
- Phylum: Chordata
- Class: Mammalia
- Infraclass: Placentalia
- Order: Rodentia
- Family: Heteromyidae
- Genus: Chaetodipus
- Species: C. intermedius

Binomial name
- Chaetodipus intermedius (Merriam, 1889)

= Rock pocket mouse =

Species of rodent

The rock pocket mouse (Chaetodipus intermedius) is one of 19 species of pocket mice in the genus Chaetodipus. It is sometimes grouped in the genus Perognathus.

== Description ==
Found mainly in rocky outcrops in the deserts of the southwestern United States and Mexico, the rock pocket mouse is medium-sized (length ~18 cm, weight ~12–18g) and nocturnal. It eats mainly plant seeds and makes small burrows in soil close to or under rocks to evade owls, its main predator. The breeding season spans a few months, starting in February or March, and the litter size is typically between three and six. As with most pocket mice, the tail is longer than the body (~10 cm).

== Taxonomy ==
Historically, rock pocket mice have been subdivided into as many as ten subspecies (Benson 1933; Dice and Blossom 1937) based on geographical distribution and coat colour. Most rock pocket mouse populations have light, tawny fur consistent with the colour of the desert rocks on which they live. However, darker coloured rock pocket mice are found living amid black, basaltic rock formations.

== Example of natural selection ==
In 2003, scientists led by Michael W. Nachman sampled DNA from both light- and dark-colored rock pocket mice from areas in Pinacate Peaks, Mexico and New Mexico, USA. In the Pinacate mice, they discovered a perfect association between different versions of the Melanocortin-1 receptor (Mc41r6) gene and coat color. Subsequent studies demonstrated that there is strong selective pressure maintaining Mc1r allele and coat color frequencies across the short geographic distances between the light- and dark-colored rock islands.

Thus melanism in rock pocket mice is considered a fabulous example of adaptation by natural selection. Changes in the Mc1r gene sequence are not responsible for the color difference in the mice sampled from New Mexico, however, leading the researchers to conclude that the almost identical dark coat colors developed multiple times in rock pocket mice, an example of convergent evolution.

The rock pocket mouse is used as an example of natural selection in the California Department of Education's 2016 Science Framework. In 2011, a short documentary on the mice was produced by the Howard Hughes Medical Institute (HHMI).

== Etymology ==
The "Chaetodipus" of Chateodipus intermedius comes from the Greek "chaeto" (bristle) and "dipus" (two-footed), referring to the hairy feet of the pocket mice that allow them to navigate rocky terrain. "Intermedius" alludes to their two fur color alleles and ability to live in both light and dark rocky regions.

== See also ==
- Heteromyidae
- Perognathus
- Peppered moth evolution
