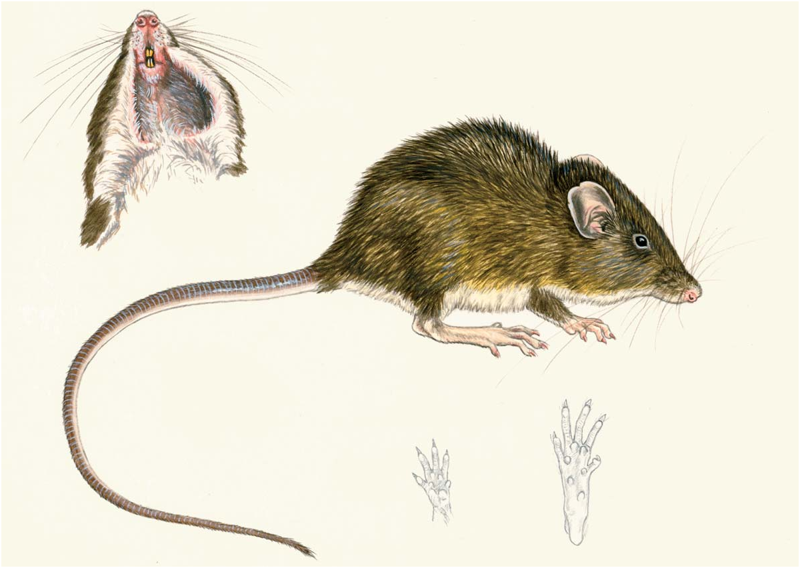

Scientific classification
- Kingdom: Animalia
- Phylum: Chordata
- Class: Mammalia
- Order: Rodentia
- Family: Heteromyidae
- Genus: Heteromys
- Species: H. nubicolens

Binomial name
- Heteromys nubicolens Anderson, 2006

= Cloud-dwelling spiny pocket mouse =

Species of rodent

The cloud-dwelling spiny pocket mouse (Heteromys nubicolens) is a species of rodent (Rodentia) that is endemic to the high elevations of Cordillera de Tilarán and Cordillera de Guanacaste within Costa Rica. It is contained within the Heteromys desmarestianus species complex.

== Taxonomy and etymology ==
The cloud-dwelling spiny pocket mouse (Heteromys nubicolens) is contained within the subfamily Heteromyinae (spiny pocket mice), which represents a monophyletic grouping within the rodent family Heteromyidae. It was officially designated as a species in 2006 and is in valid taxonomic standing with the Integrated Taxonomic Information System (ITIS). This mouse gets both its common and scientific name from its range distribution within the cloud forests of northwestern Costa Rica. Nubicolens, or cloud-dwelling, is derived from the Lain nubes (cloud) and colo (dwell or inhabit).

Originally, H. nubicolens was thought to be contained within Heteromys desmarestianus. However, recent morphological, karyological, and genetic information has revealed that H. desmarestianus represents a species complex consisting of at least 11 distinct haplotype groups. Three of these haplotypes have been designated as unique species—Heteromys goldmani, Heteromys oresterus, and H. nubicolens—while the remaining eight are thought to represent variants of H. desmarestianus due to geographical variation. Limited taxonomic sampling has prevented the complete determination of phylogenetic relationships within the Heteromys genus.

== Description ==
=== Fur coloration and texture ===
The dorsal fur of the cloud-dwelling spiny pocket mouse is dark brown, with faint grizzling and thin ochraceous hairs intermixed among spines. The grizzling is less pronounced along the midline, creating a slight dark dorsal stripe. The ventral fur is pure white and lacks spines. Their ears are dark brown to grey and their tail is strongly bicoloured along most of its length but becomes uniformly dark at the distal end. Limb coloration extends from the body coloration, with dorsal surfaces exhibiting dark fur and ventral surfaces exhibiting white fur.

=== Morphology ===
H. nubicolens ranges in length from 291 to 358 mm (11.5 to 14.1 in) with head-to-tail length ranging from 104 to 183 mm (4.1 to 7.2 in). Its mass ranges from 60 to 136 g (2.1 to 4.8 oz). The tail length is typically longer than the head-to-body length. Its hind feet are relatively large with a naked planar surface. It has a dental formula of I1/1, C0/0, P1/1, M3/3, totaling 20 teeth.

=== Geographical variation ===
Within the genus Heteromys, it has been noted that lower elevation populations sometimes exhibit increased spininess than higher elevation populations. However, it is not certain whether this trend is also seen in H. nubicolens.

=== Comparisons to similar species ===
Due to their close geographic range and phylogenetic relatedness, H. nubicolens is most easily confused with H. desmarestianus. Outwardly, the two species are nearly identical with both displaying dark brown dorsal fur and white ventral fur. However, H. nubicolens can be differentiated by its larger size and distinct cranial morphology. On average, H. nubicolens exhibits larger cranial proportions than H. desmarestianus; however, H. desmarestianus exhibits a wider interorbital distance and braincase. In Peñas Blancas Valley where the two species are thought to overlap, H. desmarestianus has pronounced ochraceous hairs around the neck region, creating a 'collar' of sorts that can also be used to differentiate it from H. nubicolens.

Alongside size and cranial morphology, H. nubicolens also differs from H. desmarestianus and other species within this complex by the absence of an ochraceous lateral line, less grizzling in the fur, a larger tail to head-and-body length, and the presence of a grey dorsal stripe due to a reduction in ochraceous hairs along the midline. However, none of these features are distinctive enough to allow for a confident identification.

In comparison to other species within Heteromys, the dark brown grizzled fur of H. nubicolens helps differentiate it from most other species which typically possess either pale brown grizzled fur or slate grey fur that lacks grizzling. Further, size and cranial features, along with distinct geographic ranges can be helpful in distinguishing between species within Heteromys.

=== Hybridization ===
No interspecies hybridization has been confirmed in H. nubicolens. However, two specimens collected near Río Colorado exhibit cranial morphology that is intermediate of H. nubicolens and H. desmarestianus, suggesting the possibility of hybridization between these two species along their narrow range overlap. However, genetic studies are needed to confirm hybridization within the Heteromys genus.

== Geographic range ==
The cloud-dwelling spiny pocket mouse (H. nubicolens) is endemic to the Cordillera de Tilarán and Cordillera de Guanacaste within Costa Rica where it ranges in elevation from 750 to 1,840 m (2,460 to 6,040 ft). Populations of H. nubicolens have been discovered in three highland areas—Monteverde, Volcán Rincón de la Vieja-Volcán Santa María, and Cerro Cacao—but populations may exist elsewhere in areas lacking survey efforts. These populations are separated by areas of intervening lowlands, which likely causes geographic isolation.

== Habitat ==
The cloud-dwelling spiny pocket mouse (H. nubicolens) inhabits the forest floor within higher elevation forests ranging from 750 m to 1840 m, depending on the specific population. Species within Heteromys tend to prefer wetter forests, in contrast to their sister genus, Liomys, that show a preference for semiarid and subtropical forests. H. nubicolens appears to have a moderate tolerance for anthropogenically disturbed habitats, but is not found within highly disturbed areas such as those affected by agriculture or development. Further, it can be found within both primary forests and secondary forests over 20 years old. However, higher capture rates within secondary forests suggest they occur more commonly in these habitats over primary forests. These mice show no difference in distribution between naturally regenerated and reforested secondary forests, suggesting they fare equally well in either habitat. Variation in elevation range based on locale suggests that temperature and precipitation may both play a role in the distribution of H. nubicolens.

== Diet ==
No information is known about the dietary habits of H. nubicolens. However, H. desmarestianus is mainly a graminivore, but will occasionally also eat insects, fruits, small vertebrates, and plant matter. Further, many other species of Heteromys have also been documented eating seeds, fruits, and insects, along with fungus. This suggests that H. nubicolens is likely a generalist graminivore.

== Behavior ==
The only behavior reported specifically to H. nubicolens is that they are passive and make no audible vocalizations when handled. Contrarily, H. desmarestianus has been shown to be very vocal and actively struggles when handled.

H. desmarestianus has been documented as a good climber, although it primarily travels along the forest floor by hopping. Further, it digs burrows into the ground or rotten logs where it will hoard seeds and nuts it collected in its cheek pouches. Given the similarities between H. nubicolens and H. desmarestianus, it is likely that H. nubicolens exhibits similar behavioral traits.

== Communication ==
When handled, H. nubicolens does not produce any audible vocalizations. Further, the closely related species H. desmarestianus has been reported to make limited audible vocalizations in the wild. Given this, it is unlikely that H. nubicolens produces prominent vocalizations. However, more research is needed to confirm communication methods in H. nubicolens.

== Reproduction ==
=== Mating systems ===
Adults within H. nubicolens have a home range of approximately 0.15 hectares (0.37 acres) and are not known to shift their home ranges significantly, even over the course of several months. Immatures have a smaller home range of approximately 0.10 hectares. It is not known how tolerant individuals within H. nubicolens are of conspecific range overlap or how dominance hierarchies work.

=== General behavior ===
Breeding can occur at any time throughout the year. Females within H. desmarestianus may become reproductively inactive during long dry periods; however, it is not known if this is also true for H. nubicolens. Further, although H. desmarestianus has been observed producing up to five litters averaging approximately three offspring per year, the exact litter size and composition of H. nubicolens is not known presently.

=== Parental care ===
Typically, parental care within rodents is maternal. However, some rodent species have been documented exhibiting biparental care where both the male and female contribute to offspring care. There is no information on parental care within H. nubicolens.

=== Development ===
There is no documented information on the ontogeny of H. nubicolens. However, research on H. desmarestianus—the sister taxa to H. nubicolens—shows that gestation lasts around 27 or 28 days and newborns weigh an average of 3.0 grams. Weaning and parent-offspring separation occur within four weeks of being born. It is uncertain whether this is also applicable to H. nubicolens.

== Longevity and mortality ==
Species within Heteromyidae have been reported to live between two and five years, depending on the species. It is possible that H. nubicolens also falls within this range.

== Predation, parasitism, and commensalism ==
H. nubicolens is known to be parasitized by both lice and ticks. One louse species of the genus Fahrenholzia is thought to be host-specific to H. nubicolens.

Several commensalism relationships have also been noted for H. nubicolens. A species of tineid moth (Amydria selvae) is phoretic to H. nubicolens, meaning it uses the mouse for dispersal. Further, both nymph and adult Epichernes vickeriae (Pseudoscorpiones: Chernetidae) have been found on H. nubicolens, suggesting they complete their entire lifecycle within the nests of this mouse.

== Ecosystem roles ==
The presumed seed hoarding behaviours of H. nubicolens likely make it an important seed disperser within its ecosystem. It is also likely that H. nubicolens serves as a food source for predatory species within the area. However, no predation events have been reportedly observed.

== Economic importance ==
=== Positive ===
It is possible that H. nubicolens distributes seeds of economically important plants. However, further research is required to confirm or deny this.

=== Negative ===
No negative impacts have been reported.

== Cultural significance ==
There is no reported cultural significance of H. nubicolens.

== Conservation status ==
Preliminary research suggests that H. nubicolens does not require any species conservation protection, however, more studies on its distribution and population size are required to make a formal decision based on IUCN criteria. Further, much of the known range of H. nubicolens is contained within extensive private and governmental reserves.

Due to its preference for moderate to low disturbance, closed-canopy forests, H. nubicolens is at risk of deforestation and increased urbanization.

== Genetic data ==
Karyotyping of H. nubicolens shows that it has a diploid number of 2n = 60 and a fundamental number of FN = 86. The unique Barcode Index Number (BIN) can be found on the Biodiversity of Life Database (BOLD) under the accession number AAC7365. Sequences specimens are housed at the Royal Ontario Museum in Canada.
