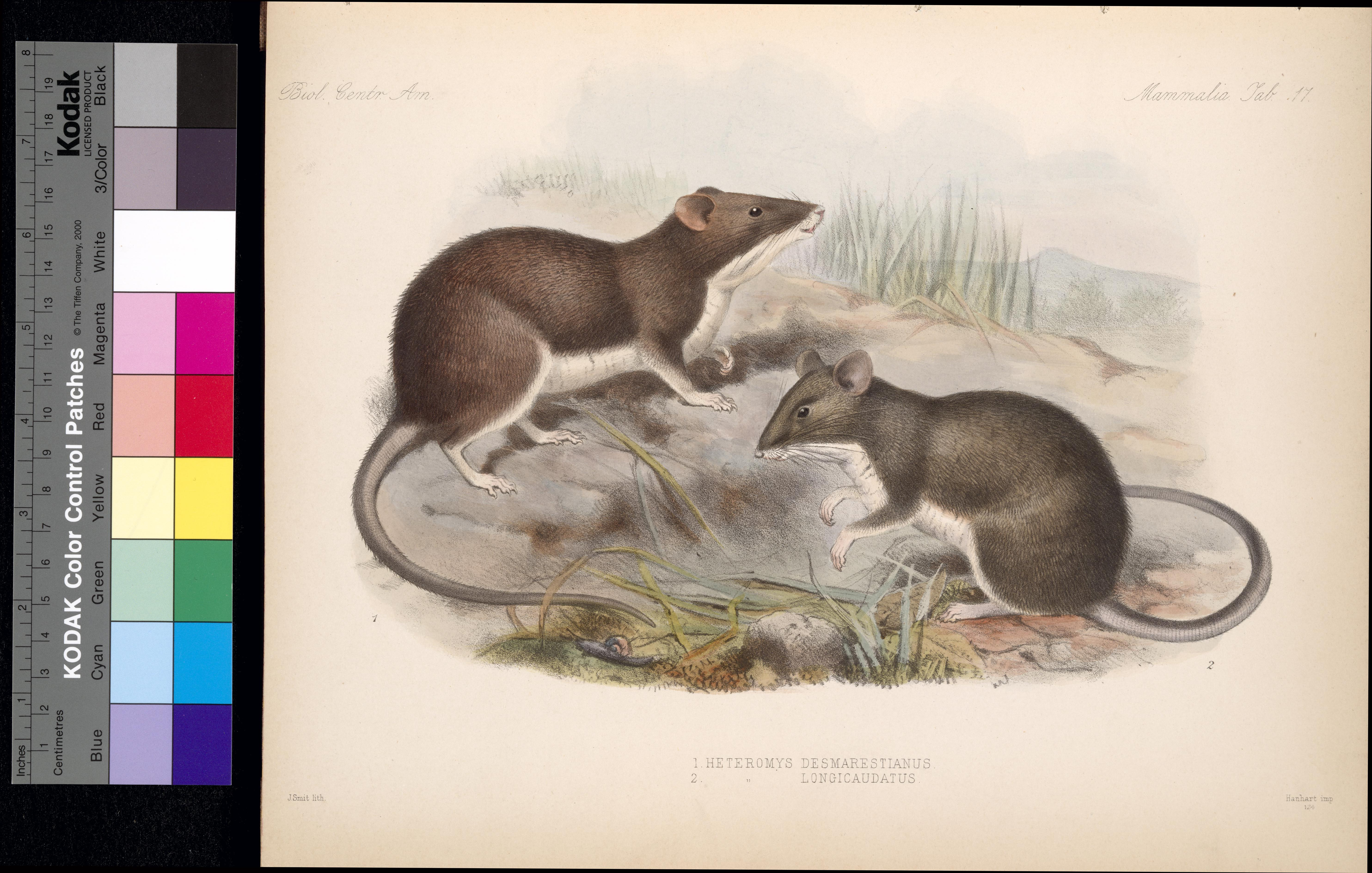
- Heteromys desmarestianus

Scientific classification
- Kingdom: Animalia
- Phylum: Chordata
- Class: Mammalia
- Infraclass: Placentalia
- Order: Rodentia
- Family: Heteromyidae
- Subfamily: Heteromyinae
- Genus: Heteromys; Desmarest, 1817

Type species
- Mus anomalus Thompson, 1815
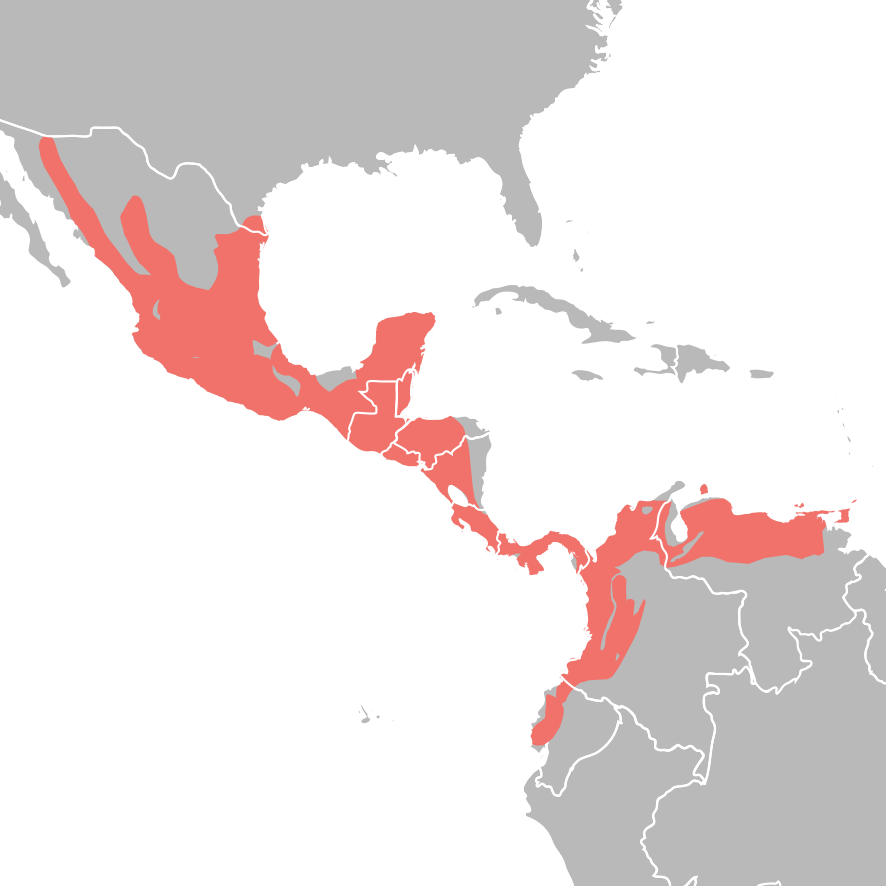
- Heteromys distribution

= Heteromys =

Genus of rodents

Heteromys is a genus of rodents in the family Heteromyidae, commonly known as spiny pocket mice. It is the only extant genus in the subfamily Heteromyinae which also includes the extinct genera Diprionomys and Metaliomys. Heteromys was recently enlarged by inclusion of the members of formerly recognized heteromyine genus Liomys, which was found to be paraphyletic.

== Distribution ==
Heteromyines are distributed from southern Texas to Ecuador and Venezuela, and include all but one of the castorimorph species of South America. Like all of South America's other non-caviomorph rodents, they arrived in the continent relatively recently as part of the Great American Interchange. They inhabit mainly forests; some are also found in scrubland.

== Taxonomy ==
The genus Heteromys comprises the following species of spiny pocket mice:

- Panamanian spiny pocket mouse (H. adspersus)
- Trinidad spiny pocket mouse (H. anomalus)
- Southern spiny pocket mouse (H. australis)
- Overlook spiny pocket mouse (H. catopterius)
- Desmarest's spiny pocket mouse (H. desmarestianus)
- Gaumer's spiny pocket mouse (H. gaumeri)
- Goldman's spiny pocket mouse (H. goldmani)
- Mexican spiny pocket mouse (H. irroratus)
- Nelson's spiny pocket mouse (H. nelsoni)
- Cloud-dwelling spiny pocket mouse (H. nubicolens)
- Paraguaná spiny pocket mouse (H. oasicus)
- Mountain spiny pocket mouse (H. oresterus)
- Painted spiny pocket mouse (H. pictus)
- Salvin's spiny pocket mouse (H. salvini)
- Jaliscan spiny pocket mouse (H. spectabilis)
- Ecuadoran spiny pocket mouse (H. teleus)
