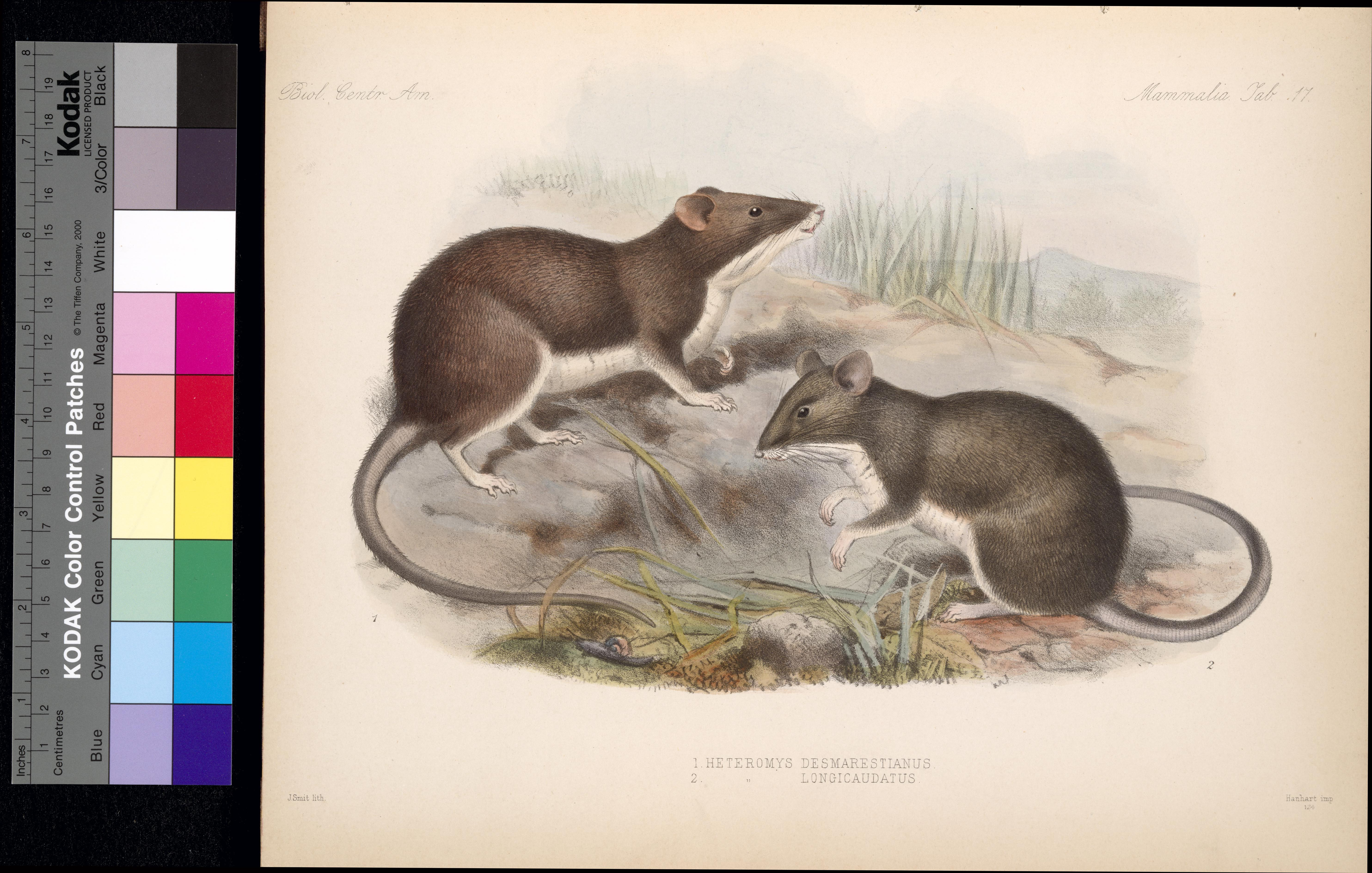
- Heteromys desmarestianus

Scientific classification
- Kingdom: Animalia
- Phylum: Chordata
- Class: Mammalia
- Infraclass: Placentalia
- Order: Rodentia
- Family: Heteromyidae
- Subfamily: Heteromyinae; Gray, 1868

Genera
- †Diprionomys Kellogg, 1910; Heteromys Desmarest 1817; †Metaliomys Korth & De Blieux, 2010
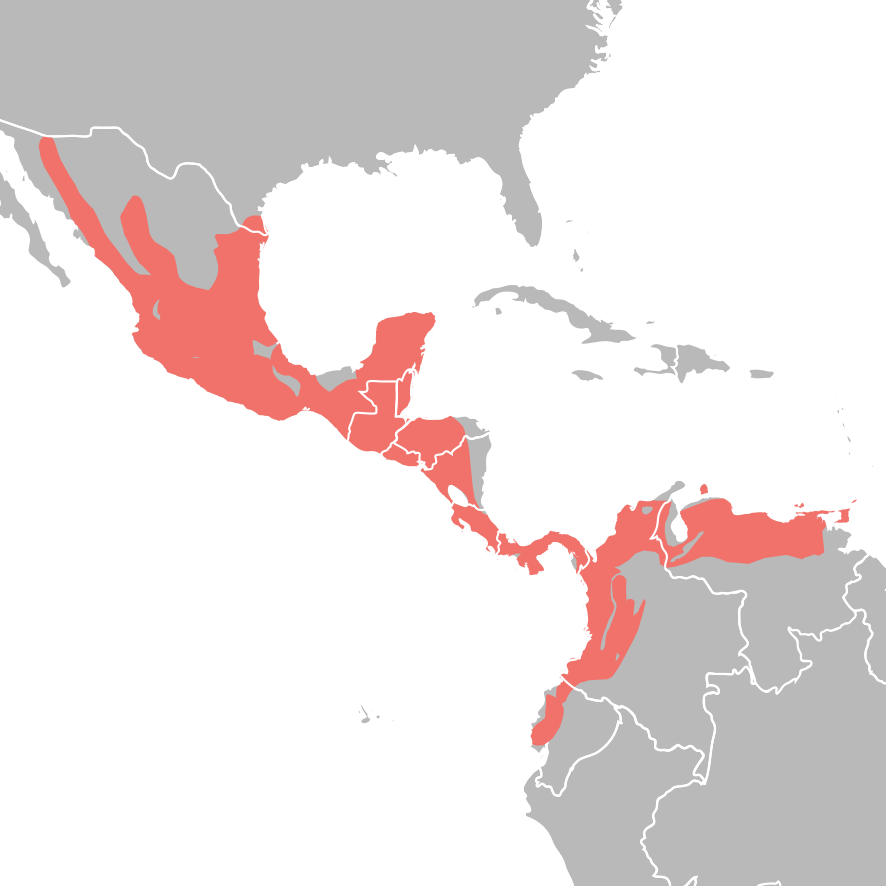
- Extant Heteromyinae distribution

= Heteromyinae =

Heteromyinae Temporal range: Middle Miocene–Recent

Subfamily of rodents

Heteromyinae is a subfamily of rodents in the family Heteromyidae, commonly known as spiny pocket mice. It contains a single extant genus, Heteromys, as well as the extinct genera Diprionomys and Metaliomys. Heteromys was recently enlarged by inclusion of the members of formerly recognized heteromyine genus Liomys, which was found to be paraphyletic.

== Taxonomy ==
Heteromyinae is the sister group of Perognathinae; the two are estimated to have split about 22-23 million years (Ma) ago. The most recent common ancestor of extant heteromyines is thought to have lived 12-15 Ma ago; the basal species in the subfamily is H. salvini.
