= Jaliscan spiny pocket mouse =

Conservation status
- Endangered (IUCN 3.1)

Scientific classification
- Kingdom: Animalia
- Phylum: Chordata
- Class: Mammalia
- Order: Rodentia
- Family: Heteromyidae
- Genus: Heteromys
- Species: H. spectabilis

Binomial name
- Heteromys spectabilis (Genoways, 1971)

Species of rodent

The Jaliscan spiny pocket mouse (Heteromys spectabilis) is a species of heteromyid rodent endemic to Mexico. The specific name spectabilis means "striking", and refers to the animal's relatively bright coloration. It was formerly placed in the genus Liomys, which is now recognized to be paraphyletic and has been subsumed into Heteromys.

The Jaliscan spiny pocket mouse is a relatively large member of its genus, measuring 12 to 14 cm (4.7 to 5.5 in) in head-body length, with a tail about the same length again. Adult males weigh about 68 g (2.4 oz) on average, while females are significantly smaller, weighing 51 g (1.8 oz) on average. The fur is reddish brown over the back and flanks, and consists of fine soft hair beneath, and almost entirely hidden by, a dense coat of stiff spines. The flanks are also marked with a bright ochre stripe running lengthways down the body, while the underparts are white.

The mouse is found only in southeast Jalisco in Mexico. It inhabits xerophytic areas and oak forest at altitudes between 950 and 1,615 m (3,117 and 5,299 ft), and is common among low brush or grass, as well as in agricultural land. Little else is known of its biology, although one captured female was observed to be pregnant with five embryos in September. There are no recognised subspecies.

One of the major threats to the survival of this species is habitat loss caused by the timber extraction from the pine-oak forests in this region. Even though this species has been declared endangered and protected by the Mexican law, they are rapidly decreasing in number with a limited severely fragmented distribution.

The closest living relative of the Jaliscan spiny pocket mouse is the painted spiny pocket mouse. The common ancestor of these two species split in response to changing climate, with the painted species becoming restricted to the coastal regions of western Mexico, and the Jaliscan species to the interior.
