= Panamanian spiny pocket mouse =

Conservation status
- Least Concern (IUCN 3.1)

Scientific classification
- Kingdom: Animalia
- Phylum: Chordata
- Class: Mammalia
- Order: Rodentia
- Family: Heteromyidae
- Genus: Heteromys
- Species: H. adspersus

Binomial name
- Heteromys adspersus Peters, 1874
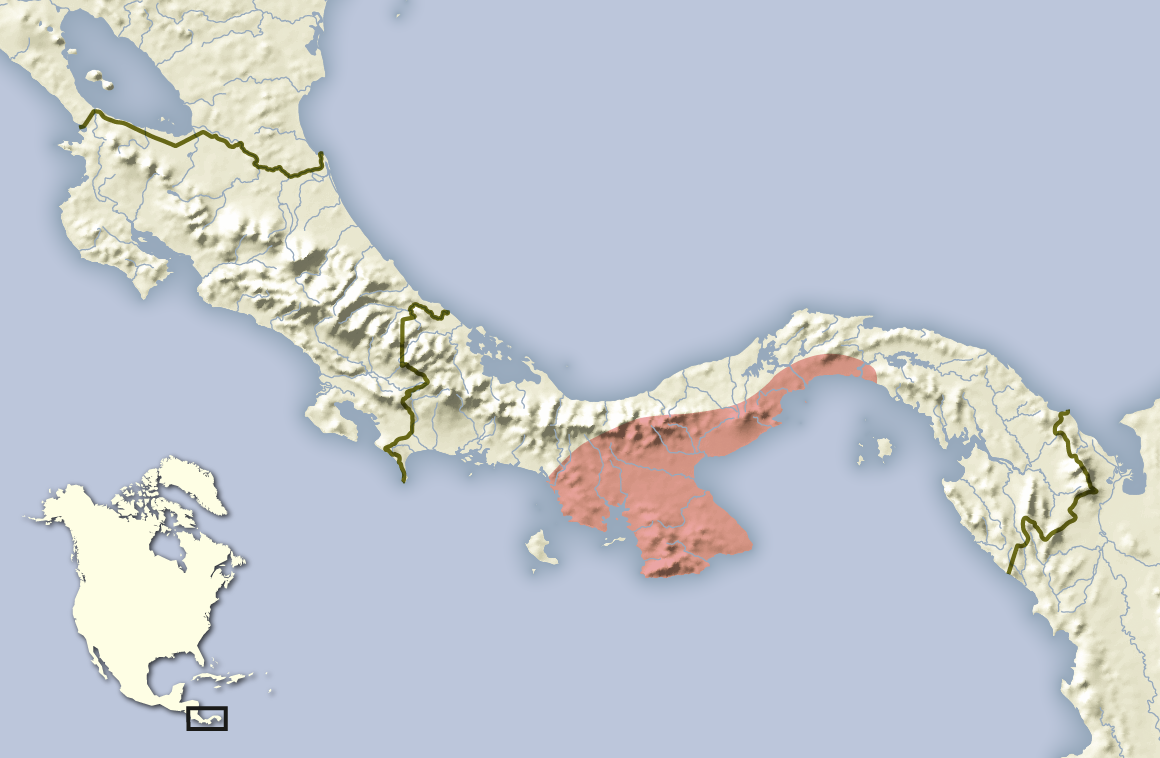

Species of rodent

The Panamanian spiny pocket mouse (Heteromys adspersus), also known as Peter's spiny pocket mouse, is a species of heteromyid rodent endemic to Panama. It is very closely related to Salvin's spiny pocket mouse, and has been placed in the same species group by some authors. It was formerly placed in the genus Liomys, which is now recognized to be paraphyletic and has been subsumed into Heteromys.

== Description ==
The Panamanian spiny pocket mouse is very similar in appearance to other species of its genus. Adults range from 22 to 28 centimetres (8.7 to 11.0 in) in total length, including a tail 10 to 15 centimetres (3.9 to 5.9 in) in length, with males being larger than females. The animal has chocolate to greyish brown fur, with yellowish underparts and limbs. Over the flanks and upper parts of the body, the brown fur is interspersed with darker spines and occasional orange hairs. The tail has a moderate covering of hair, and is darker on the upper than on the lower surface.

== Distribution and habitat ==
Panamanian spiny pocket mice are found only in southern and western Panama, along the Pacific coast between David and Chepo, and inland as far as the headwaters of rivers flowing into the Atlantic. It inhabits hilly scrubland, secondary forests and semi-arid savannah country below about 600 metres (2,000 ft).

== Behaviour and biology ==
Panamanian spiny pocket mice are nocturnal, and feed mainly on the nuts of palm trees such as Bactris and Attalea, although they also eat other plant material and some insects. They spend the day sleeping in burrows, which have multiple entrances and are also used to store seeds. They locate their food primarily by scent, and are able to carry seeds in their cheek pouches. They are solitary, inhabiting home ranges averaging just 0.56 hectares (1.4 acres). Although aggressive when kept together in captivity, in the wild they may reach population densities of up to 11 per hectare (4.5/acre), with significant overlap between home ranges.

Breeding takes place between December and May, in the dry and early wet seasons. Females give birth to one or two litters of two to four pups each year. Few individuals survive for more than a year in the wild, although a maximum lifespan of eighteen months has been recorded.
