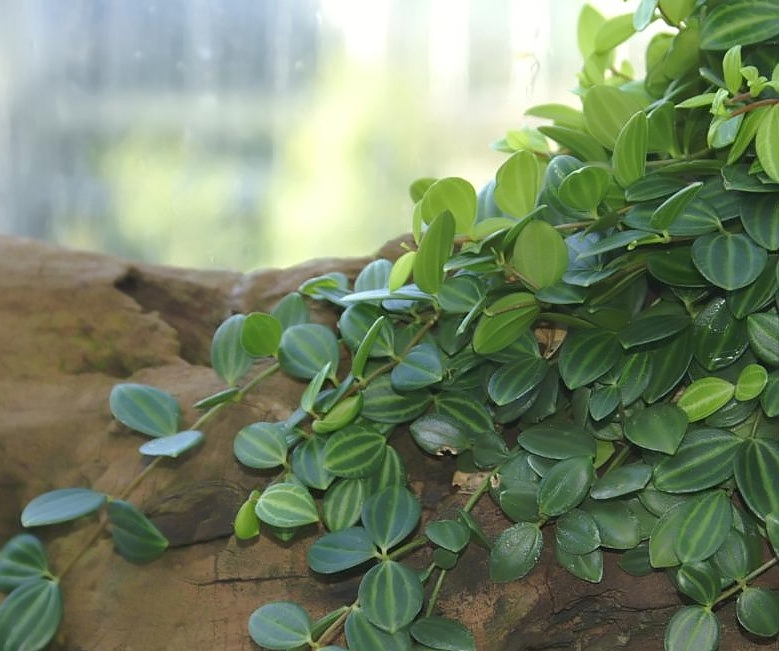

Scientific classification
- Kingdom: Plantae
- Clade: Tracheophytes
- Clade: Angiosperms
- Clade: Magnoliids
- Order: Piperales
- Family: Piperaceae
- Genus: Peperomia
- Species: P. quadrangularis

Binomial name
- Peperomia quadrangularis (J.V.Thomps.) A.Dietr.

Synonyms
- List: Peperomia allenii Trel.; Peperomia angulata Kunth; Peperomia angulata var. orbicans Dahlst.; Peperomia angulata var. parvifolia C.DC.; Peperomia atabapoensis Steyerm.; Peperomia carlo-wrightii Trel.; Peperomia muscosa Link; Peperomia pirrisana Trel.; Piper angulatum (Kunth) Poir.; Piper muscosum (Link) Schult.; Piper quadrangulare J.V.Thomps.; Piper quadrangulum Willd. ex Miq.

= Peperomia quadrangularis =

Species of plant

Peperomia quadrangularis, commonly known as the beetle peperomia, is a species of plant in the genus Peperomia of the family Piperaceae. Its native range is in tropical America, including areas in northern South America, Central America and the West Indies.

As a houseplant it is often sold under the synonym Peperomia angulata with lighter variants labelled "rocca verde" and darker "rocca scuro", and sometimes abbreviated (e.g. "Peperomia rocca scuro").

== Description ==
Peperomia quadrangularis is a small herby plant, often found growing on top of trees or rocks. The latin name points to the stems which are quadrangular, one to two millimetre thick, and feature tiny hairs. Leaves are elliptic, obovate, or orbicular, 10 to 22 mm wide and 12 to 30 mm long, with obtuse or only slightly pointed apex. The leaves grow typically opposite, although adventitious roots can sometimes take the place of a leaf.
