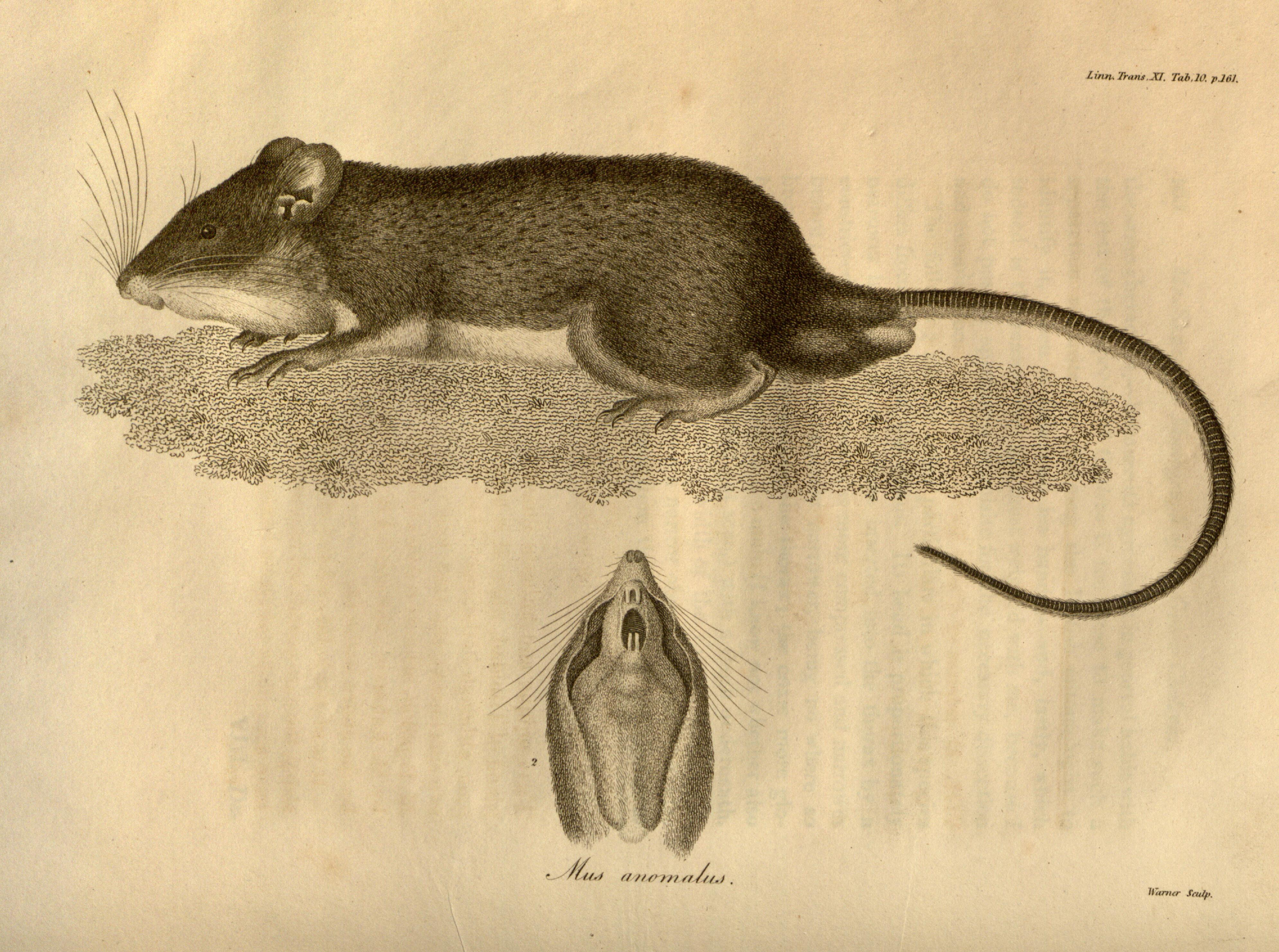

Conservation status
- Least Concern (IUCN 3.1)

Scientific classification
- Kingdom: Animalia
- Phylum: Chordata
- Class: Mammalia
- Order: Rodentia
- Family: Heteromyidae
- Genus: Heteromys
- Species: H. anomalus

Binomial name
- Heteromys anomalus (Thompson, 1815)

= Trinidad spiny pocket mouse =

Species of rodent

The Trinidad spiny pocket mouse (Heteromys anomalus) is a species of rodent in the family Heteromyidae. It is found in Colombia, Trinidad and Tobago, and Venezuela.
