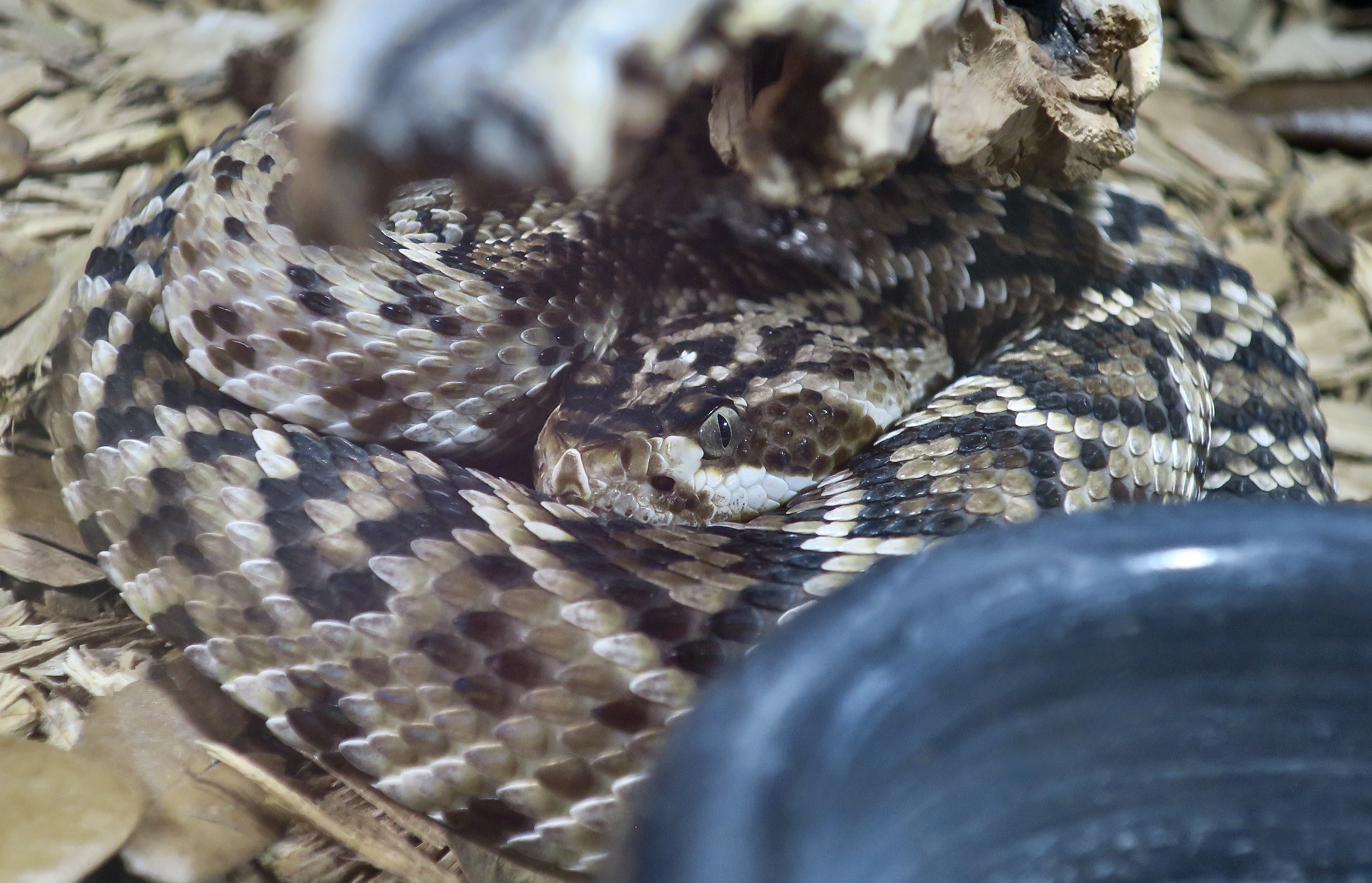

Scientific classification
- Kingdom: Animalia
- Phylum: Chordata
- Order: Squamata
- Suborder: Serpentes
- Family: Viperidae
- Genus: Crotalus
- Species: C. molossus
- Subspecies: C. m. oaxacus

Trinomial name
- Crotalus molossus oaxacus Gloyd, 1948

= Crotalus molossus oaxacus =

Subspecies of Mexican Black-tailed Rattlesnake

Crotalus molossus oaxacus, or the Oaxacan black-tailed rattlesnake, is a subspecies of black-tailed rattlesnake which is native to its namesake, Oaxaca, Mexico. As with all rattlesnakes, it is venomous. While it is currently recognised as a subspecies, it has been suggested to be further researched and reviewed as a species by Muñoz-Mora et al. due to its being the basal and most divergent clade of the species, splitting around 7.5 million years ago in the Miocene.

== Prey/diet ==
Crotalus molossus oaxacus is known to eat a variety of rodents, such as the Northern Pygmy Mouse and the Mexican spiny pocket mouse.

== Reproduction ==
Crotalus molossus oaxacus is known to be ovoviviparous.
