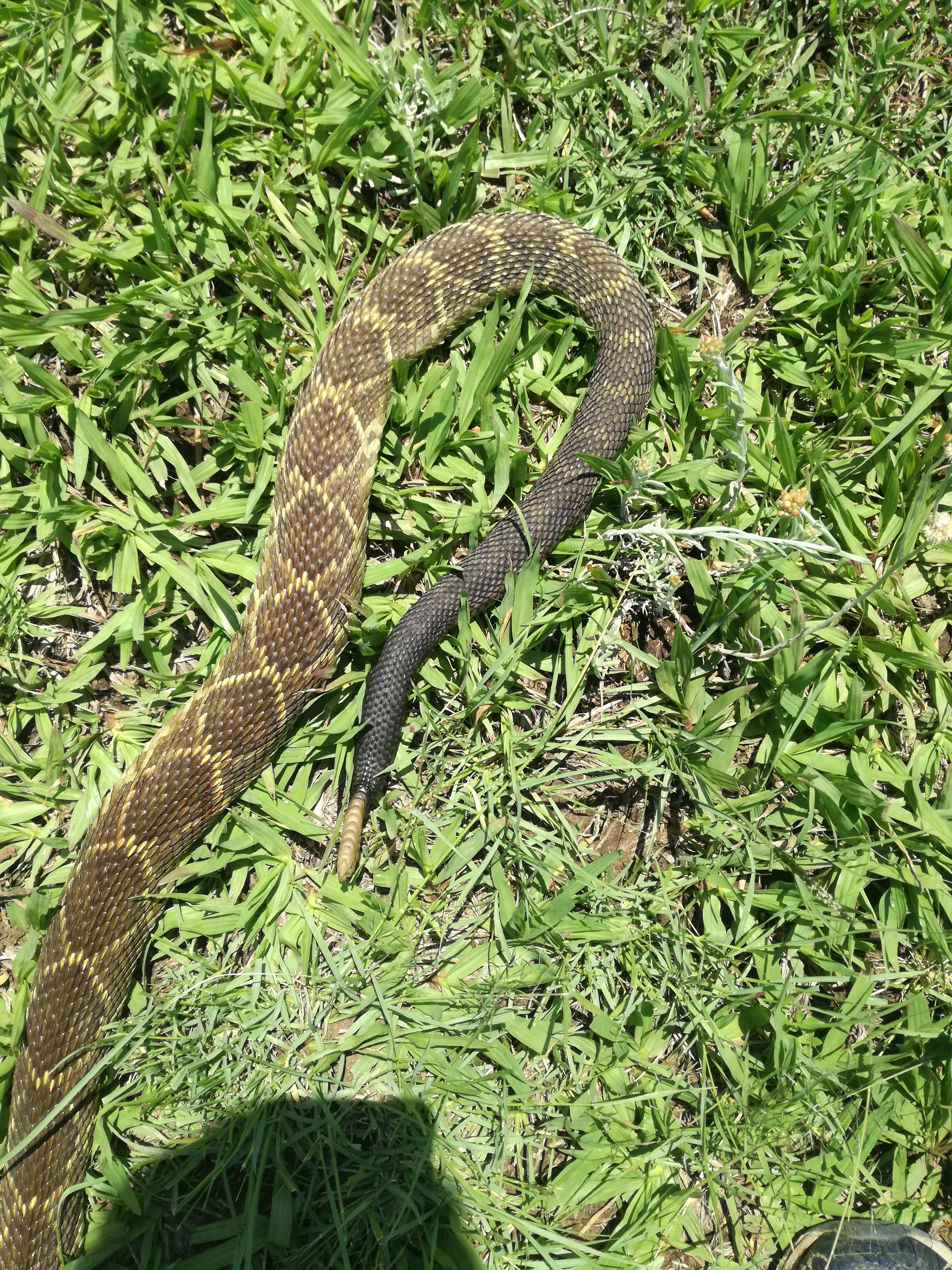

Scientific classification
- Kingdom: Animalia
- Phylum: Chordata
- Order: Squamata
- Suborder: Serpentes
- Family: Viperidae
- Genus: Crotalus
- Species: C. molossus
- Subspecies: C. m. nigrescens

Trinomial name
- Crotalus molossus nigrescens Gloyd, 1936

= Crotalus molossus nigrescens =

Subspecies of South American rattlesnake

Crotalus molossus nigrescens, or the Mexican black-tailed rattlesnake, is a subspecies of black-tailed rattlesnake from Southern America. The name nigrescens comes from the Latin word "to become dark in colour". As with all rattlesnakes, it is venomous.

== Description ==
The subspecies can be distinguished from its sister subspecies by its specific scale counts (less scale rows and less ventral scutes) and its colouring. it has around 20 distinguishable diamond splotches, lined with yellow, which do not join (they do in Crotalus molossus molossus) and it is noticeably darker. It is a light olive brown, gradually darkening towards the tail. Its head is also black, with a few light coloured scales. Its underside is also a light cream colour.

== Range ==
Crotalus molossus nigrescens is known to be present through Mexico's highlands, specifically southern Chihuahua to northern Oaxaca.

== Reproduction ==
Crotalus molossus nigrescens is known to be ovoviviparous.
