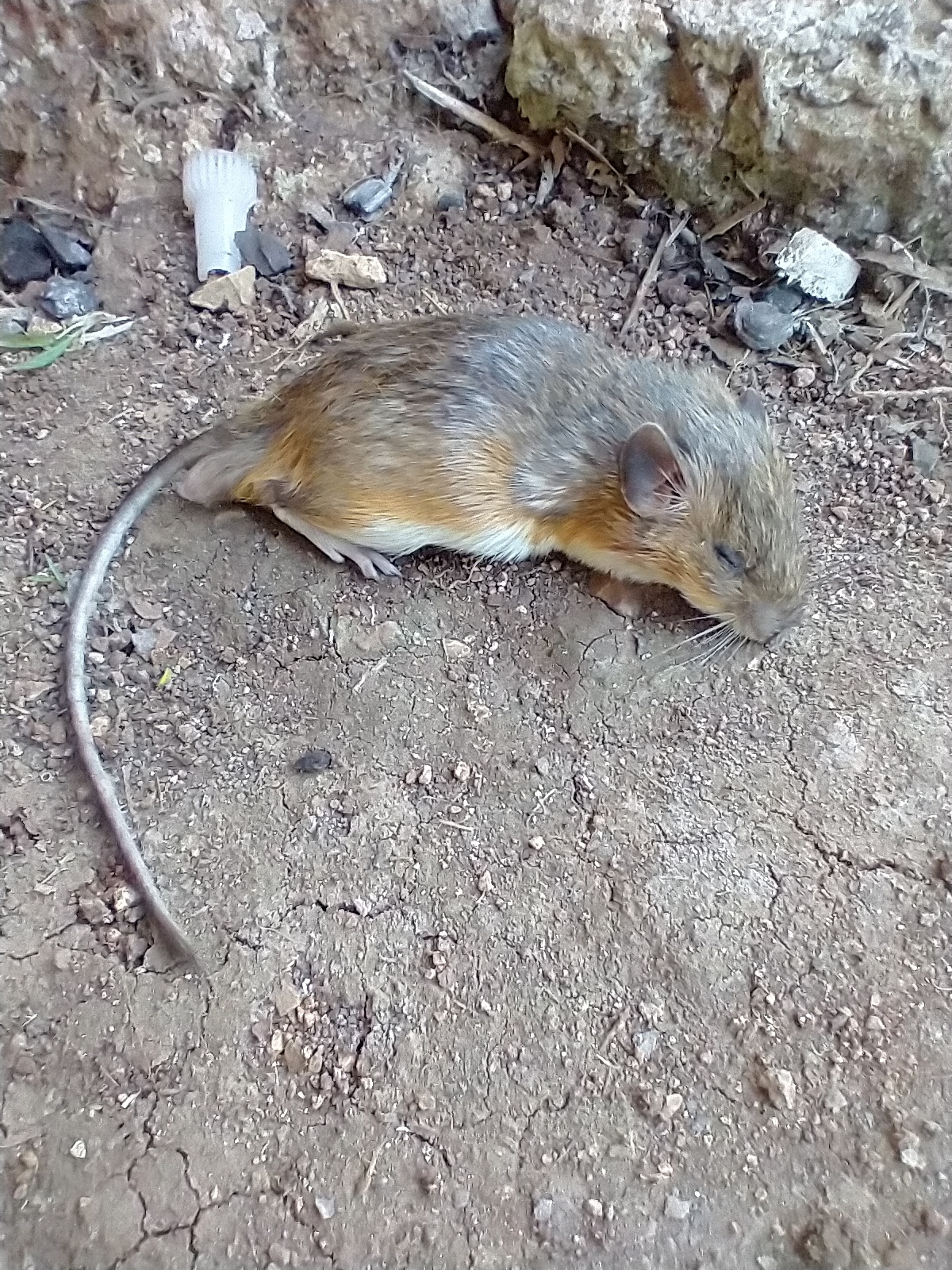

Conservation status
- Least Concern (IUCN 3.1)

Scientific classification
- Kingdom: Animalia
- Phylum: Chordata
- Class: Mammalia
- Order: Rodentia
- Family: Heteromyidae
- Genus: Heteromys
- Species: H. gaumeri

Binomial name
- Heteromys gaumeri J. A. Allen & Chapman, 1897

= Gaumer's spiny pocket mouse =

Species of rodent

Gaumer's spiny pocket mouse (Heteromys gaumeri) is a species of rodent in the family Heteromyidae. It ranges over northern Belize and Guatemala and the Yucatán Peninsula of Mexico, where it lives in lowland semideciduous forest and thorn scrub. The species is nocturnal and terrestrial; it is solitary and strongly territorial. It is named after physician and biologist George F. Gaumer, who lived in the Yucatán from 1885 to 1929.
