= Goldman's spiny pocket mouse =

Scientific classification
- Kingdom: Animalia
- Phylum: Chordata
- Class: Mammalia
- Order: Rodentia
- Family: Heteromyidae
- Genus: Heteromys
- Species: H. goldmani

Binomial name
- Heteromys goldmani Merriam, 1902

Species of rodent

Goldman's spiny pocket mouse (Heteromys goldmani) is a species of rodent in the family Heteromyidae. It has been reported to be a subspecies of Heteromys desmarestianus. It is found in Guatemala and Mexico. Its natural habitat is subtropical or tropical moist lowland forests.
