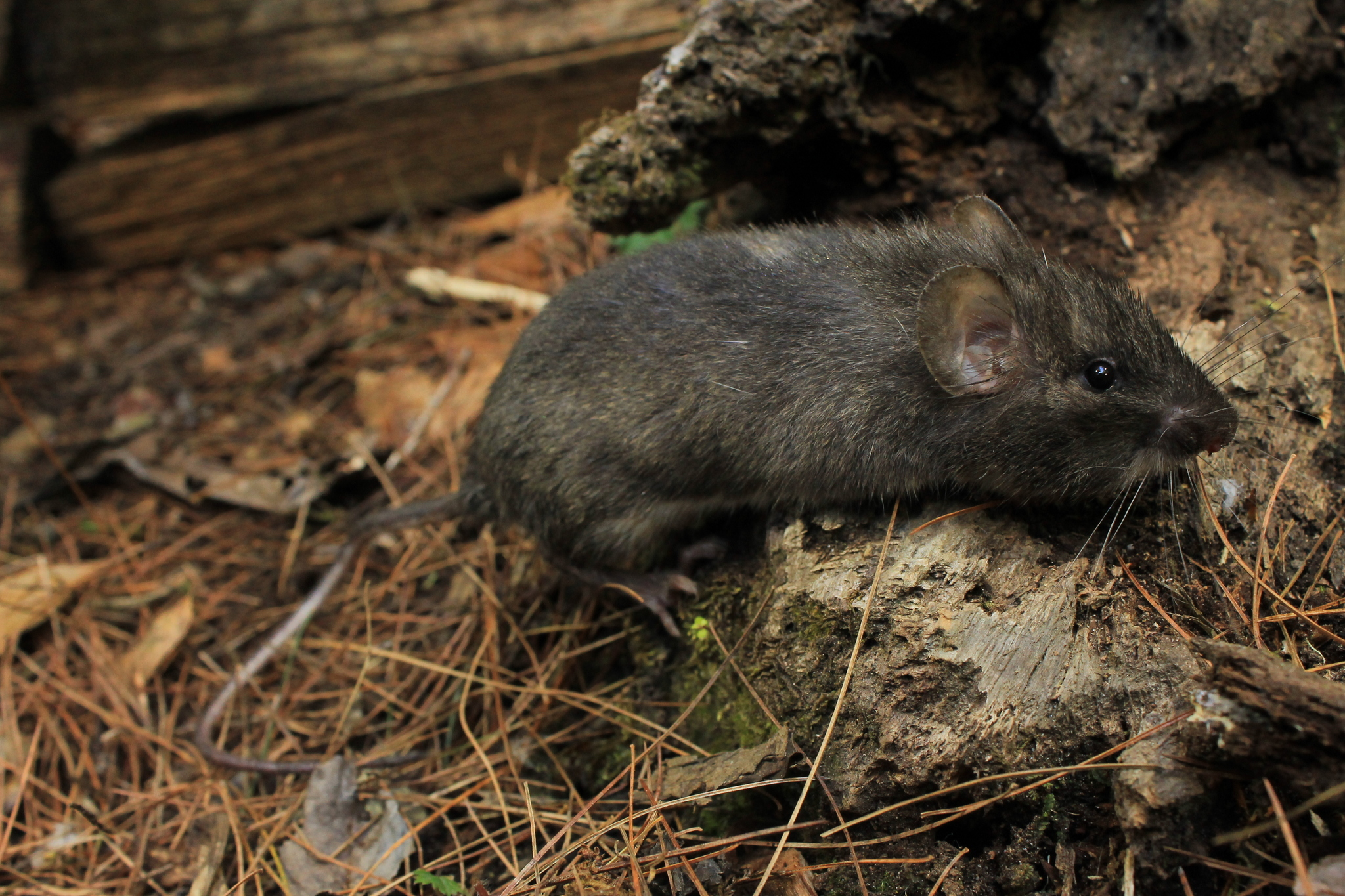

Conservation status
- Endangered (IUCN 3.1)

Scientific classification
- Kingdom: Animalia
- Phylum: Chordata
- Class: Mammalia
- Order: Rodentia
- Family: Heteromyidae
- Genus: Heteromys
- Species: H. nelsoni

Binomial name
- Heteromys nelsoni Merriam, 1902

= Nelson's spiny pocket mouse =

Species of mouse

Nelson's spiny pocket mouse (Heteromys nelsoni) is a species of rodent in the family Heteromyidae. It is found in Mexico and Guatemala. Its natural habitat is subtropical or tropical moist lowland forests. It is threatened by habitat loss.
