= Diprionomys =

Diprionomys Temporal range: Late Miocene

Scientific classification
- Kingdom: Animalia
- Phylum: Chordata
- Class: Mammalia
- Order: Rodentia
- Family: Heteromyidae
- Subfamily: Heteromyinae
- Genus: †Diprionomys; Kellogg, 1910

Species
- †D. agrarius (Wood, 1935); †D. minimus (Kellogg, 1910); †D. parvus (Kellogg, 1910)

Extinct genus of mammals

Diprionomys is an extinct genus of Heteromyidae that existed in the United States during the Late Miocene period.
