= Mountain spiny pocket mouse =

Conservation status
- Least Concern (IUCN 3.1)

Scientific classification
- Kingdom: Animalia
- Phylum: Chordata
- Class: Mammalia
- Infraclass: Placentalia
- Order: Rodentia
- Family: Heteromyidae
- Genus: Heteromys
- Species: H. oresterus

Binomial name
- Heteromys oresterus W. P. Harris, 1932

Species of rodent

The mountain spiny pocket mouse (Heteromys oresterus), also known as the soft-haired pocket mouse is a species of rodent in the family Heteromyidae endemic to Costa Rica.

== Morphology ==
The mountain spiny pocket mouse is a dark gray rodent with a white underbelly. The ears are black with white edging. The tail is black on top and at the base with a white underside (excluding the base) and a white tip. Collected adult specimens have ranged from 30.4 — 35.3cm long and weighted between 64.0 and 98.0g.

The mountain spiny pocket mouse is distinguished from other Heteromys species by the bristles of its coat which are soft in H. oresterus but stiff and spiny in the other species.

== Habitat and natural history ==
The mountain spiny pocket mouse is endemic to the Talamanca Range of Costa Rica and can be found at altitudes between 1,900 and 2,600 feet. It inhabits wet oak forests.

Little is known about the ecology or natural history of H. oresterus specifically. Heteromys pocket mice are nocturnal rodents which feed on seeds and dig burrows under rocks and foliage. Females birth litters of 3-5 pups.

== Description ==
The mountain spiny pocket mouse was described by William P. Harris Jr. in 1932 based on a specimen collected from El copey de dota in the Cartago Province of Costa Rica. The type specimen is held at the University of Michigan Museum of Zoology. While Harris does not specify the etymology of the species name in this publication, it may be derived from the Greek oresteros (ὀρέστερος) meaning "of the mountains."
