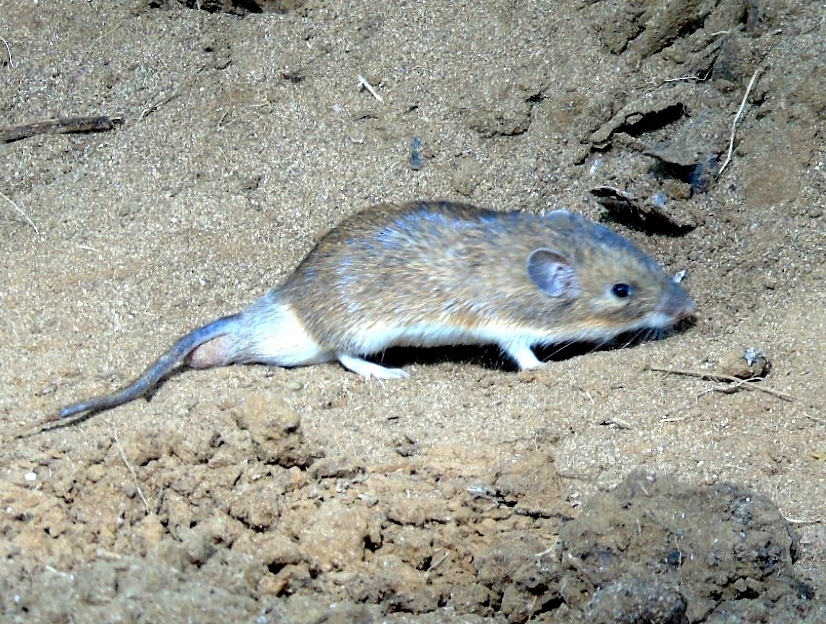

Conservation status
- Least Concern (IUCN 3.1)

Scientific classification
- Kingdom: Animalia
- Phylum: Chordata
- Class: Mammalia
- Order: Rodentia
- Family: Heteromyidae
- Genus: Heteromys
- Species: H. pictus

Binomial name
- Heteromys pictus Thomas, 1893
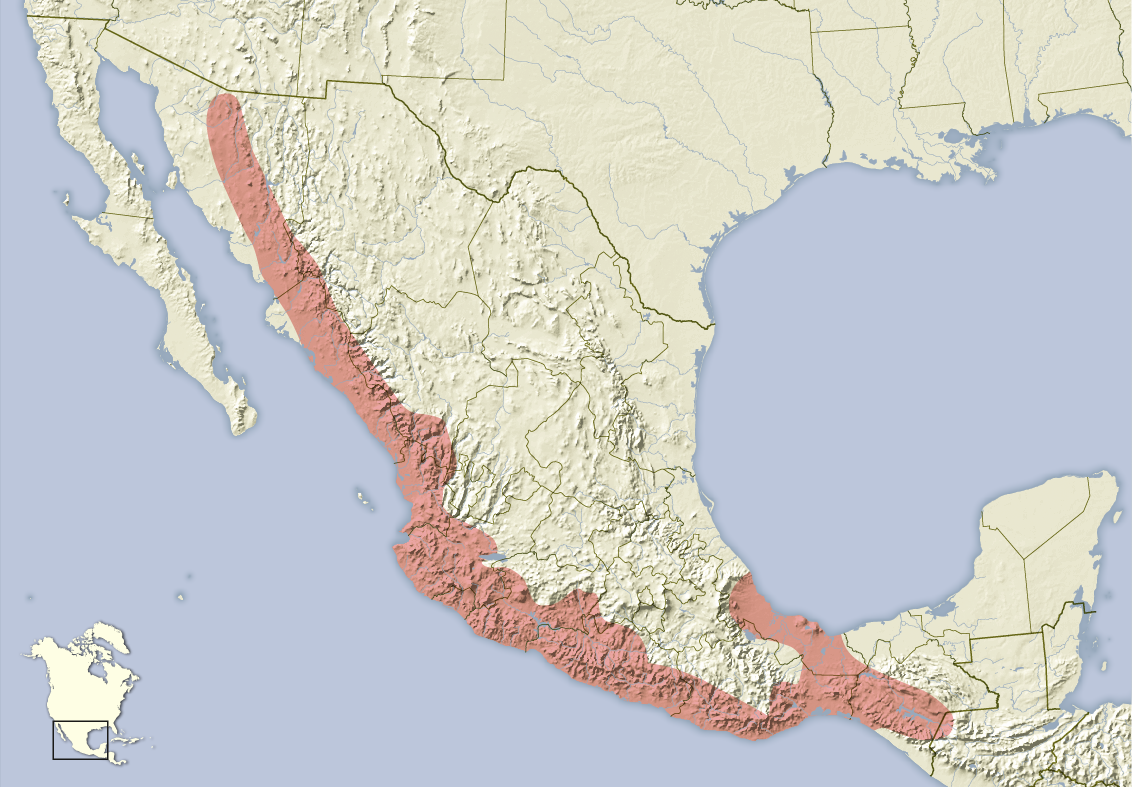

= Painted spiny pocket mouse =

Species of rodent

The painted spiny pocket mouse (Heteromys pictus) is a species of rodent in the family Heteromyidae. It is found in Mexico and the northern tip of Guatemala. It was formerly placed in the genus Liomys, which is now recognized to be paraphyletic and has been subsumed into Heteromys.

== Description ==
The painted spiny pocket mouse is a medium-sized species and grows to a head and body length of about 12 cm (4.7 in) with a tail as long again, males being slightly larger than females. The pelage is composed of a mixture of stiff spines with soft, slender hairs, but because the hairs do not curl upward, the spines are the prominent feature of the coat. The upper parts of the head and body are reddish-brown and the underparts are white. The lateral line that separates the dorsal and ventral colors is some shade of dark or pale ochre. Immature pocket mice are grey and their coat consists mainly of soft hairs.

== Distribution and habitat ==
The painted spiny pocket mouse is found in Mexico and Guatemala at altitudes of up to 1,000 metres (3,300 ft). Its range includes western Mexico, from the state of Sonora southwards to the state of Chiapas, the eastern Mexican state of Veracruz, and the extreme northwestern corner of Guatemala. Its typical habitat is dry deciduous woodland or bushy scrubland and it occurs near streams in otherwise arid regions, often in places with cactus and acacia. In regions where their ranges overlap, it occurs in moister, lower habitats than the Mexican spiny pocket mouse (Heteromys irroratus).

== Behavior ==
The painted spiny pocket mouse is nocturnal and solitary, with individuals just coming together for breeding. It lives in a burrow and engages in such activities as sand bathing, collecting seeds in its cheek pouches, caching food, scratching and caring for its coat. The diet mainly consists of seeds (large ones being preferred), green vegetation and small invertebrates such as spiders, moths, crickets and beetles.

Breeding takes place throughout most of the year, though few pregnant females were recorded between December and February and male mice had smaller testicles during that period. Litter sizes range from two to six and the average gestation period is 25 days. The litter may stay together for one to two months but separates when there is a high level of aggression among the littermates.

== Status ==
The painted spiny pocket mouse has a wide range and is common in parts of that range. The IUCN lists it as being of "least concern" as, although its population trend is downward due to forest clearance, it is not declining at a rate so fast as to warrant a more threatened category.
