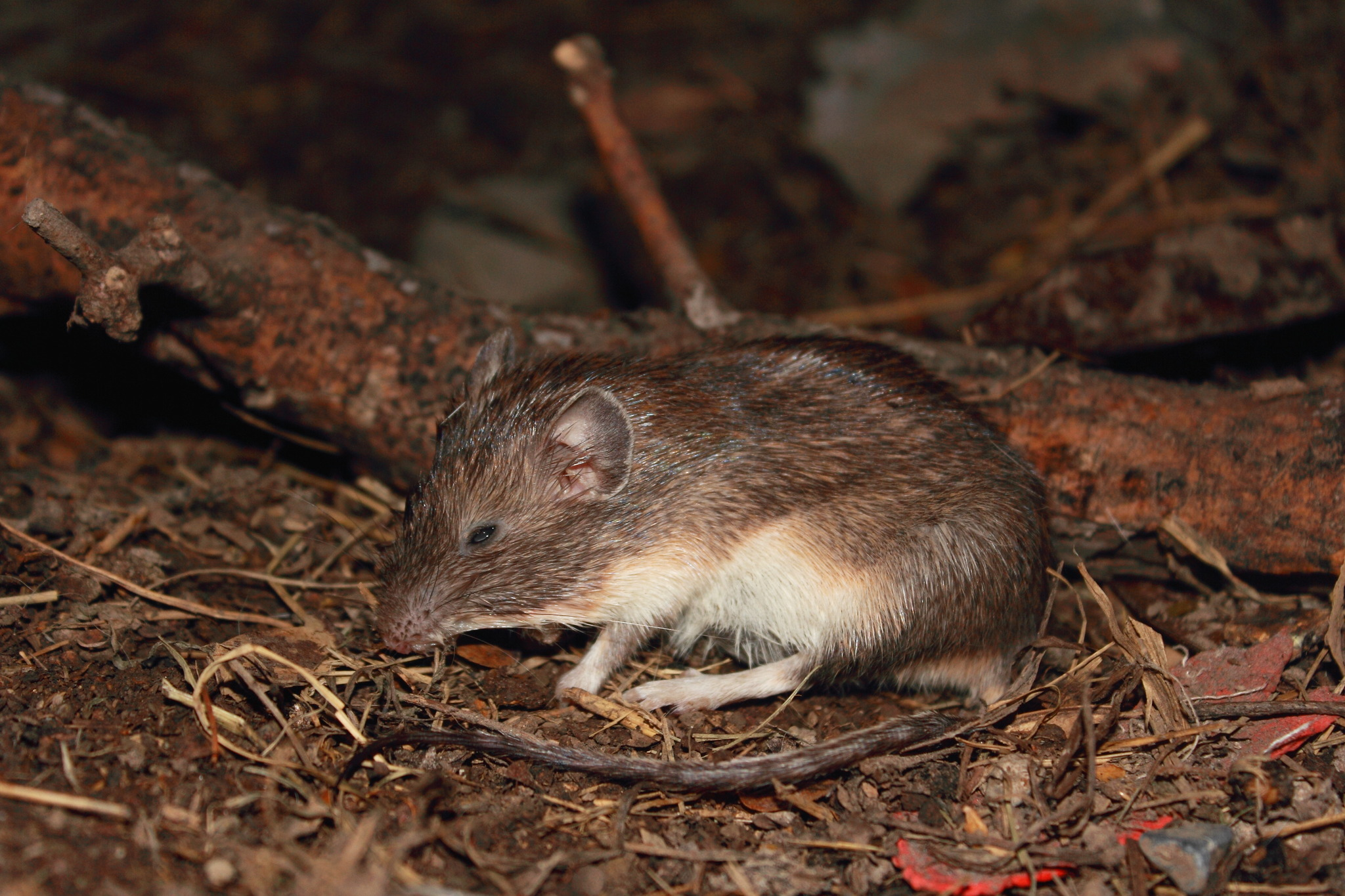
- Heteromys irroratus texensis

Conservation status
- Least Concern (IUCN 3.1)

Scientific classification
- Kingdom: Animalia
- Phylum: Chordata
- Class: Mammalia
- Order: Rodentia
- Family: Heteromyidae
- Genus: Heteromys
- Species: H. irroratus

Binomial name
- Heteromys irroratus J. E. Gray, 1868
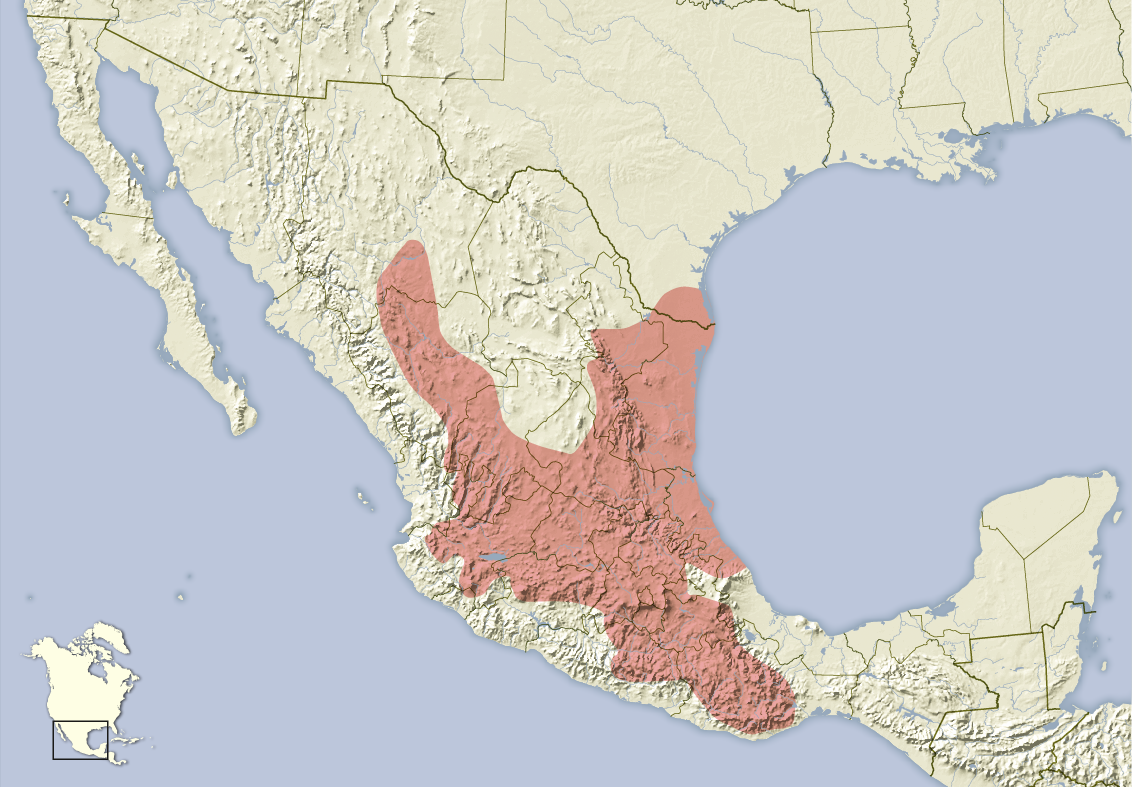

= Mexican spiny pocket mouse =

Species of rodent

The Mexican spiny pocket mouse (Heteromys irroratus) is a species of rodent in the family Heteromyidae. It is native to Mexico and Texas in the United States where it is found in dry, scrubby habitats. The IUCN has assessed it as being of "least concern". It was formerly placed in the genus Liomys, which is now recognized to be paraphyletic and has been subsumed into Heteromys.

== Description ==
There are seven subspecies of Mexican spiny pocket mouse and there is considerable differences in color and size between different populations. In general it is a medium-sized member of its genus Heteromys, growing to a head and body length of about 12 cm (4.7 in) with a tail of about the same length. The pelage is composed of a mixture of stiff spines with soft hairs, but because the hairs lie flat, the spines are the more noticeable part of the coat. The upper parts of the head and body are greyish-brown and the underparts whitish. There is a pinkish or buff lateral line separating the two colors. Juveniles are grey and initially lack spines which grow through the coat later. The soles of the feet are haired and the Mexican spiny pocket mouse is unique in its genus in possessing five rather than six tubercles on the hind foot.

== Distribution and habitat ==
The Mexican spiny pocket mouse is endemic to parts of Texas and Mexico. Its range extends from just north of the Rio Grande southwards to the Mexican Plateau, its southernmost limit being Zapotitlán in the state of Oaxaca. It is found in dry shrubland at altitudes of up to 3,000 metres (9,800 ft). In regions where their ranges overlap, it occurs in drier, upland habitats than the painted spiny pocket mouse (Liomys pictus). It is not normally present in areas with less than 50 centimetres (20 in) of annual rainfall.

== Parasites ==
The Mexican spiny pocket mouse is parasitized by the mouse botfly, Cuterebra fontinella.

== Behavior ==
Four different methods of locomotion are used by the Mexican spiny pocket mouse. The fastest is a kangaroo-like leaping gait, during which the mouse can cover 1.5 metres (5 feet) in a second. This pocket mouse is nocturnal and spends the day in a burrow, the entrance of which may be covered with leaves or an earth mound. The diet consists largely of seeds, particularly of hackberry (Celtis sp.), mesquite and other trees and shrubs. These are stored in cheek pouches and carried back to the burrow. In laboratory studies it was found that this pocket mouse was unable to maintain its body weight unless it had access to water. Reproduction takes place during much of the year but seems to peak between August and November. Litter sizes range from two to eight with four young being typical.

== Status ==
The Mexican spiny pocket mouse has a wide range and is common in suitable habitats within that range. The population size seems to be stable and no particular threats have been identified so the International Union for Conservation of Nature lists its conservation status as being of "least concern".
