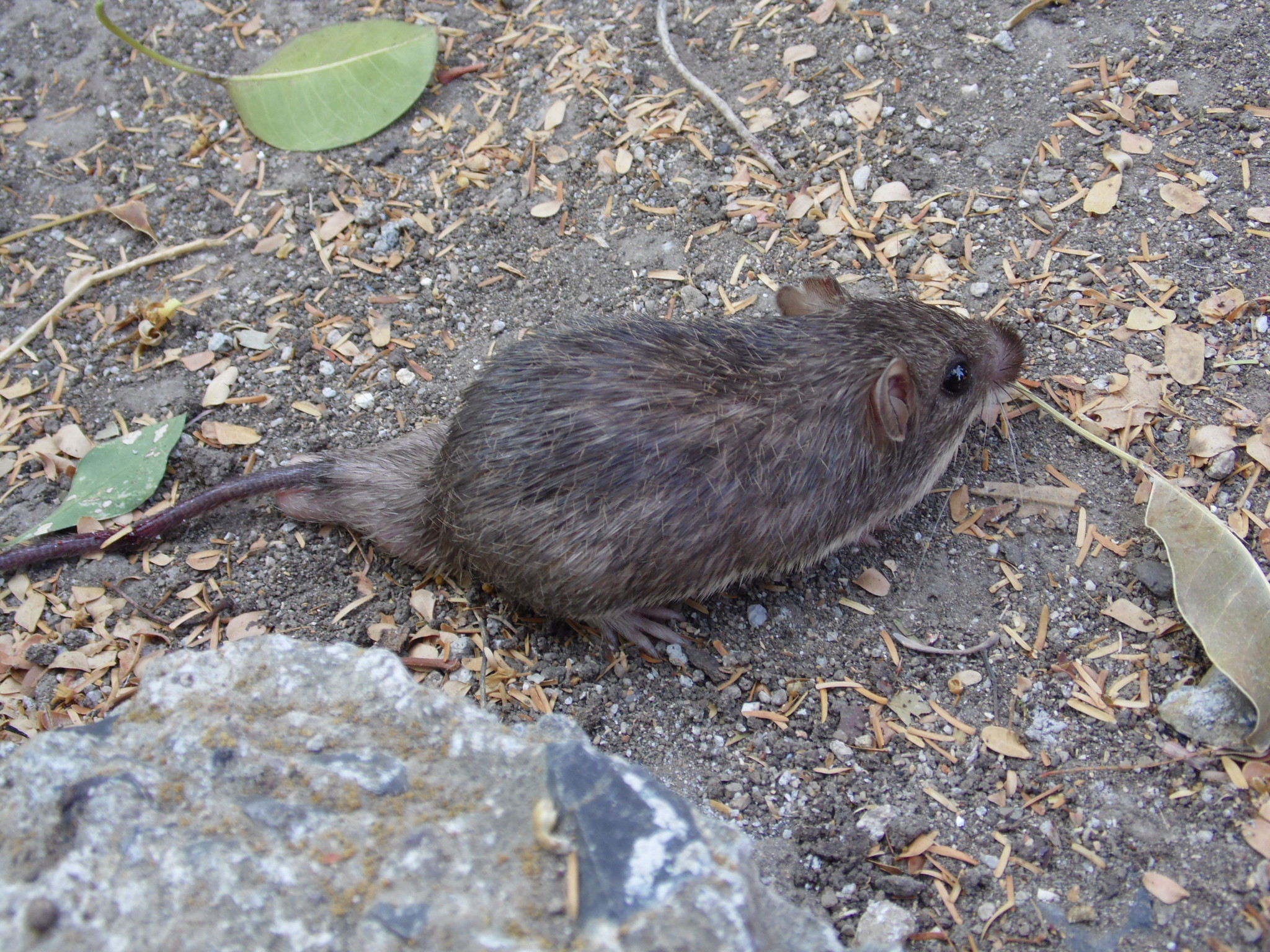

Conservation status
- Least Concern (IUCN 3.1)

Scientific classification
- Kingdom: Animalia
- Phylum: Chordata
- Class: Mammalia
- Order: Rodentia
- Family: Heteromyidae
- Genus: Heteromys
- Species: H. salvini

Binomial name
- Heteromys salvini Thomas, 1893
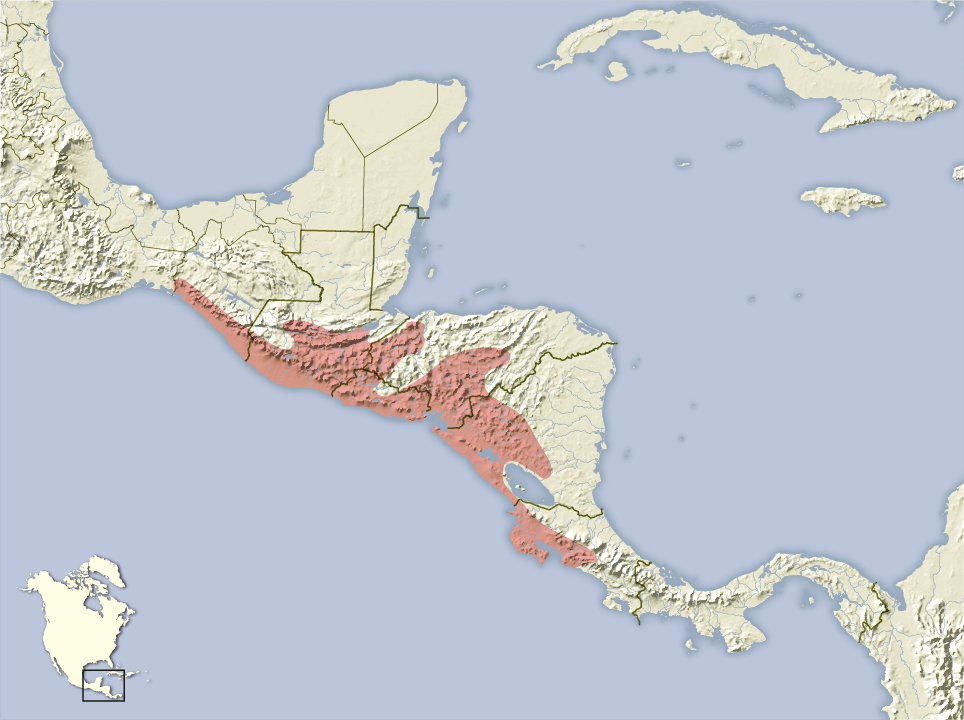

Synonyms
- Liomys salvini

= Salvin's spiny pocket mouse =

Species of rodent

Salvin's spiny pocket mouse (Heteromys salvini) is a small to medium-sized rodent in the family Heteromyidae. It was formerly placed in the genus Liomys, which is now recognized to be paraphyletic and has been subsumed into Heteromys.

== Physical characteristics ==
Like other pocket mice, it has external, fur-lined pouches in its cheeks for carrying seeds and other materials. Although the darkness of the fur can vary quite a bit geographically, it is always grey or grey-brown dorsally with cream-colored underparts, forelegs, and feet. The darker dorsal fur is meshed with dark spiny hairs and lighter, cream-colored hairs. The tail is approximately equal to the body length, bi-color, and nearly hairless (although it may have a short terminal hair cluster). In regions of overlap, H. salvini can be distinguished from other species by the lack of orange side stripes and a lack of dark forelimbs.

=== Average size ===
- Head and body length: 103–140 mm (4.1–5.5 in)
- Tail length: 97–144 mm (3.8–5.7 in)
- Hind foot length: 26–30 mm (1.0–1.2 in)
- Ear length: 12–16 mm (0.47–0.63 in)

== Distribution ==
It occupies much of the Pacific coast and adjacent mountains of Central America (from Costa Rica to Guatemala) and southernmost Mexico, usually from the lowlands to elevations of 1500 meters 1,500 meters (4,900 ft).

== Habitat ==
Heteromys salvini reaches its greatest abundance in a geographic range that is mostly semiarid tropical lowland forest. It is a nocturnal species that lives in a variety of niches, including underground and in bushes, trees, rock clusters, and log shelters, but is most commonly found in brushy, weedy fields that provide shelter to its burrows and protection from predation.

== Diet ==
Although H. salvini eat some insects, they are mainly seed-eaters. In Costa Rica, it favors the seeds of the buttercup tree during the dry season. During other seasons these mice eat the seeds of many other species, including plants, corn, wheat, beans, castor beans, and the poisonous seeds of the guanacaste tree. Because they are not often satisfied with a single meal, they can be found with cheek pouches full of seeds that are stowed away in their burrows and used when food resources are scarce. Because they are nocturnal, they often locate seeds by sense of odor. They have also reportedly been known to locate seeds that are buried in dung.

== Reproduction ==
Reproduction occupies 6 months out of the year (January–June) with an average of 2 litters annually and 4 offspring per litter. During this time females undergo a remarkable increase in weight. Because they are a precocial species, their life spans are short, resulting in a high turnover rate in the population. Most individuals will survive for only one year; a few individuals will live to be 15 to 18 months old.

== Behavior ==
This species is less social than other pocket mice. In dry forest systems, home ranges of 0.20 ha overlap, but intolerance and aggression is shown to members of the same sex. This results in the clumping of female home ranges around male home ranges. Larger individuals are dominant over smaller individuals, and adults are dominant over the young of the year. Aggression does not vary according to season.
