= Metaliomys =

Metaliomys sevierensis Temporal range: Late Miocene

Scientific classification
- Domain: Eukaryota
- Kingdom: Animalia
- Phylum: Chordata
- Class: Mammalia
- Order: Rodentia
- Family: Heteromyidae
- Genus: †Metaliomys; Korth & De Blieux, 2010
- Species: †M. sevierensis

Binomial name
- †Metaliomys sevierensis Korth & De Blieux, 2010

Extinct genus of mammal

Metaliomys is an extinct genus of Heteromyidae that existed in the United States during the Late Miocene period. The only species is Metaliomys sevierensis.
