= John Vaughan Thompson =

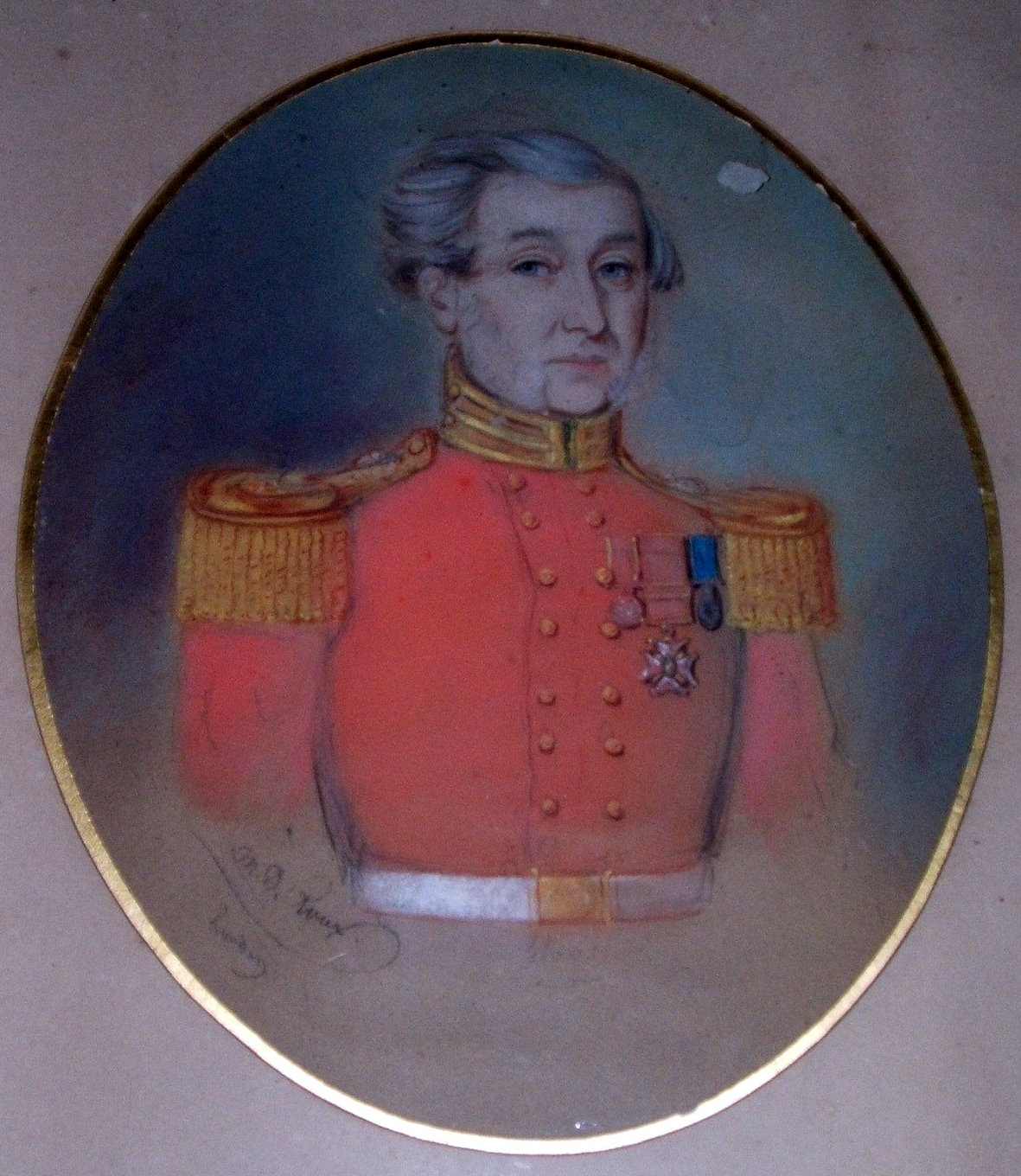
- Doctor John Vaughan Thompson wearing the uniform of an officer in the Royal Army Medical Corps. Painting by D. Roux, London, circa August 1835.
- Born: 19 November 1779; Brooklyn, New York, United States
- Died: 21 January 1847 (aged 67); Sydney, Australia
- Resting place: Headstone was at Gloucester St., Cemetery NO. 451 later removed to La Perouse, Sydney.
- Education: University of Edinburgh (1797–1798)
- Known for: Pentacrinus Europæus, Crab metamorphosis, Barnacles, Polyzoa
- Spouses: Martha Solomon (married 1817–1832); Deborah Cox (married 1835)
- Children: 8 children

John Vaughan Thompson FLS (19 November 1779 – 21 January 1847) was a British military surgeon, marine biologist, zoologist, botanist, and published naturalist.

== Early years ==
John Vaughan Thompson was born in British controlled Brooklyn on Long-Island in the Province of New York, North America on 19 November 1779. The family returned to England some time after the American victory in the American War of Independence.

He studied medicine at the University of Edinburgh (1797–1798), reading anatomy, surgery, midwifery, and botany, before joining the Army in 1799.

== Work ==
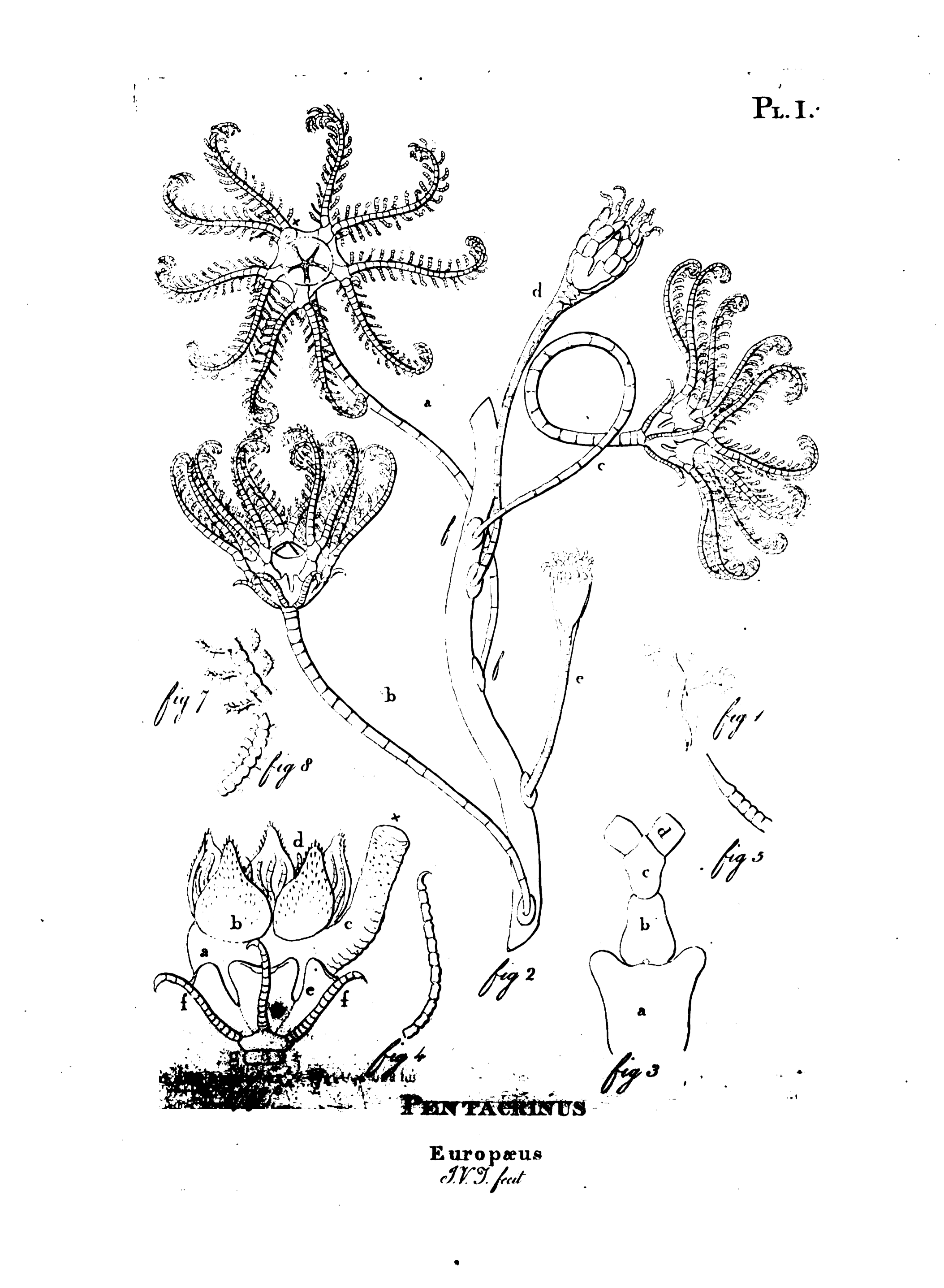
Pentacrinus europaeus, a crinoid (1827)

He grew up around Berwick-upon-Tweed where he wrote his first book A Catalogue of Plants Growing in the Vicinity of Berwick Upon Tweed which was published in 1807. In each of his military postings such as the West Indies and Guiana (1800–1809), Mauritius and Madagascar (1812–1816), he continued his natural history studies with two of his papers being read before the Linnean Society on London in 1807, the first On the genus Kaempferia in April 1807 and the second An Account of Some New Species of Piper in June; both of these were submitted on his behalf by Francis Mackenzie, 1st Baron Seaforth F.R.S and L.S.

In 1816, he was posted to County Cork in Ireland as Surgeon to the forces and later as Deputy Inspector General of Hospitals. While in Cork he published several works including researches and illustrations" (1828) which is listed as having been taken by Charles Darwin on his famous Second voyage of HMS Beagle.

== Selected works ==
- A Catalogue of Plants Growing in the Vicinity of Berwick Upon Tweed, 1807
- An Account of Some New Species of Piper, with a Few Cursory Observations on the Genus, 1807
- Description of a New Species of The Genus Mus, Belonging to the Section of Pouched Rats, 1812
- A Catalogue of The Exotic Plants cultivated in the Mauritius..., Nov. 1816
- Memoir of the Pentacrinus Europaeus: a recent species discovered in the cove of Cork, July 1, 1823, 1827
- Zoological Researches and Illustration, 1828
- Pentacrinus Europaeus and the Star Fish, 1829
- Contributions Towards the Natural History of the Dodo (Didus Ineptus Lin.), a Bird which Appears to Have Become Extinct Towards the End of the Seventeenth Century Or Beginning of the Eighteenth Century, 1829
- Zoological Researches, and Illustrations Or Natural History Nondescript Or Imperfectly Known Animals: in a Series of Memoirs, 1830
  - Memoir V of Zoological Researches: On Polyzoa, a New Animal Discovered as an Inhabitant of Some Zoophites
- The Pestilential Cholera Unmasked, and Its Real Nature and Treatment Developed: with More Effectual Means of Prevention, Proofs of Its Contagious Nature, and a Sketch of Its History and Progress. To which is Prefixed an Outline of the Symptoms, and of the Indian Or Ordinary Plan of Treatment, 1832
- Discovery of the Metamorphosis in the Second Type of the Cirripedes, Viz. the Lepades: Completing the Natural History of These Singular Animals, and Confirming Their Affinity with the Crustacea. Proceedings of the Royal Society of London 3: 356-358, 1835
- Memoir on the Star-fish of the Genus Comatula, Demonstrative of the Pentacrinus Europaeus Being the Young of Our Indigenous Species, 1836
- Statement of the Case of Jas. Mitchell, Esq., Late Surgeon, on the Civil Establishment of New South Wales, 1838
- Figures and Descriptions of Canadian Organic Remains, Decade IV Page 67 "Genus Comatula", 1859

== Death ==
In 1835 he was transferred to Sydney, Australia, as Deputy Inspector General of Hospitals in New South Wales, a position he held till he retired in 1844. He died at his home in Sydney on 21 January 1847.
