= Desmarest's spiny pocket mouse =

Conservation status
- Least Concern (IUCN 3.1)

Scientific classification
- Kingdom: Animalia
- Phylum: Chordata
- Class: Mammalia
- Order: Rodentia
- Family: Heteromyidae
- Genus: Heteromys
- Species: H. desmarestianus

Binomial name
- Heteromys desmarestianus J. E. Gray, 1868

Species of rodent

Desmarest's spiny pocket mouse (Heteromys desmarestianus) is a species of rodent in the family Heteromyidae. It is found in Colombia, Costa Rica, El Salvador, Guatemala, Honduras, Mexico, Nicaragua, and Panama.
