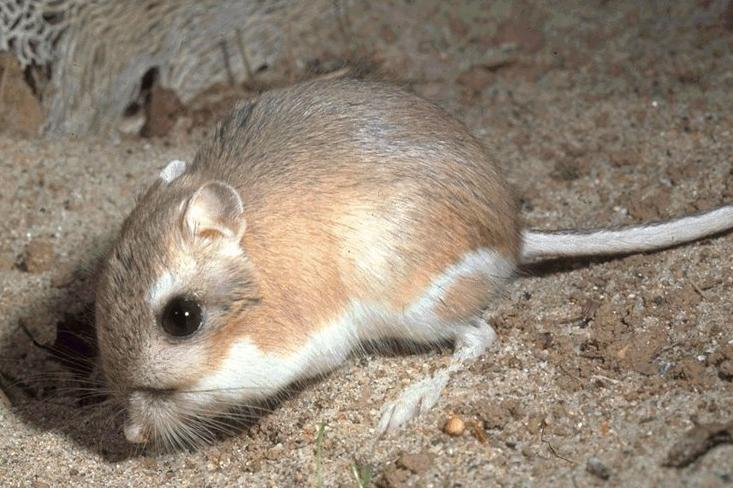
- Kangaroo rat

Scientific classification
- Kingdom: Animalia
- Phylum: Chordata
- Class: Mammalia
- Order: Rodentia
- Family: Heteromyidae
- Subfamily: Dipodomyinae; Gervais, 1853

Genera
- Dipodomys; Microdipodops; †Aurimys

= Dipodomyinae =

Dipodomyinae Temporal range: Late Miocene – Recent

Subfamily of rodents

Dipodomyinae is a subfamily of heteromyid rodents, the kangaroo rats and mice. Dipodomyines, as implied by both their common and scientific names, are bipedal; they also jump exceptionally well. Kangaroo rats and mice are native to desert and semidesert ecosystems of western North America from southern Canada to central Mexico. They are generally herbivorous foragers, and dig and live in burrows.

== Taxonomy ==
Dipodomyinae is the sister group of a Perognathinae-Heteromyinae clade; the two are estimated to have split about 22-24 million years (Ma) ago. The most recent common ancestor of extant dipodomyines is thought to have lived 15-16 Ma ago, when the two genera split. The most recent common ancestors of extant members of Dipodomys and Microdipodops are thought to have lived 10-11 and 7-8 Ma ago, respectively.

- Subfamily Dipodomyinae
  - Genus Dipodomys — kangaroo rats
    - Agile kangaroo rat, Dipodomys agilis
    - California kangaroo rat, Dipodomys californicus
    - Gulf Coast kangaroo rat, Dipodomys compactus
    - Desert kangaroo rat, Dipodomys deserti
    - Texas kangaroo rat, Dipodomys elator
    - Big-eared kangaroo rat, Dipodomys elephantinus
    - San Quintin kangaroo rat, Dipodomys gravipes
    - Heermann's kangaroo rat, Dipodomys heermanni
    - Giant kangaroo rat, Dipodomys ingens
    - Merriam's kangaroo rat, Dipodomys merriami
    - Chisel-toothed kangaroo rat, Dipodomys microps
    - Nelson's kangaroo rat, Dipodomys nelsoni
    - Fresno kangaroo rat, Dipodomys nitratoides
    - Ord's kangaroo rat, Dipodomys ordii
    - Panamint kangaroo rat, Dipodomys panamintinus
    - Phillips's kangaroo rat, Dipodomys phillipsii
    - Dulzura kangaroo rat, Dipodomys simulans
    - Banner-tailed kangaroo rat, Dipodomys spectabilis
    - Stephens's kangaroo rat, Dipodomys stephensi
    - Narrow-faced kangaroo rat, Dipodomys venustus
  - Genus Microdipodops — kangaroo mice
    - Pale kangaroo mouse, Microdipodops pallidus
    - Dark kangaroo mouse, Microdipodops megacephalus
