= List of threatened mammals of the United States =

According to the International Union for Conservation of Nature (IUCN), 65 mammal species in the United States are threatened or nearly threatened with extinction. The IUCN has classified each of these species into one of four conservation statuses: near threatened NT, vulnerable VU, endangered EN, and critically endangered CR. Also included in the list are 5 species that became extinct EX since the 1500s.

== Order Artiodactyla (even-toed ungulates and cetaceans) ==
Family Balaenidae (bowhead and right whales)

- North Atlantic right whale (Eubalaena glacialis) CR^{IUCN}
- North Pacific right whale (Eubalaena japonica) EN^{IUCN}
  - Northeast Pacific subpopulation CR^{IUCN}

Family Balaenopteridae (rorquals)

- Sei whale (Balaenoptera borealis) EN^{IUCN}
- Blue whale (Balaenoptera musculus) EN^{IUCN}
- Fin whale (Balaenoptera physalus) VU^{IUCN}
- Humpback whale (Megaptera novaeangliae) LC^{IUCN}
  - Oceania subpopulation EN^{IUCN}

Family Bovidae (bovids)

- Aoudad (Ammotragus lervia) VU^{IUCN} (introduced from North Africa)
- Blackbuck (Antilope cervicapra) LC^{IUCN} (introduced from India)
- American bison (Bison bison) NT^{IUCN}

Family Cervidae (deer)

- Hog deer (Axis porcinus) EN^{IUCN} (introduced from South Asia)
- Reindeer (Rangifer tarandus) VU^{IUCN}
- Philippine deer (Rusa marianna) VU^{IUCN} (introduced from Philippines)
- Sambar deer (Rusa unicolor) VU^{IUCN} (introduced from South Asia)

Family Monodontidae (narwhal and beluga whale)

- Beluga whale (Delphinapterus leucas) LC^{IUCN}
  - Cook Inlet subpopulation CR^{IUCN}
- Narwhal (Monodon monoceros) LC^{IUCN} (Occasional vagrant from Arctic Ocean north of Canada, Greenland, and Russia)

Family Physeteridae (sperm whale)

- Sperm whale (Physeter macrocephalus) VU^{IUCN}

== Order Carnivora (carnivorans) ==
Family Canidae (canids)

- Red wolf (Canis rufus) CR^{IUCN}
- Island fox (Urocyon littoralis) NT^{IUCN}

Family Felidae (cats)

- Jaguar (Panthera onca) NT^{IUCN}

Family Mephitidae (skunks)

- Eastern spotted skunk (Spilogale putorius) VU^{IUCN}

Family Mustelidae (mustelids)

- Sea otter (Enhydra lutris) EN^{IUCN}
- Black-footed ferret (Mustela nigripes) EN^{IUCN}
- Sea mink (Neogale macrodon) EX^{IUCN} since 1860s

Family Odobenidae (walrus)

- Walrus (Odobenus rosmarus) VU^{IUCN}

Family Otariidae (eared seals)

- Northern fur seal (Callorhinus ursinus) VU^{IUCN}
- Steller sea lion (Eumetopias jubatus) NT^{IUCN}
  - Western Steller sea lion (E. j. jubatus) EN^{IUCN}

Family Phocidae (earless seals)

- Hooded seal (Cystophora cristata) VU^{IUCN} (Occasional vagrant from Canada, Greenland, and Norway)
- Hawaiian monk seal (Neomonachus schauinslandi) EN^{IUCN}
- Caribbean monk seal (Neomonachus tropicalis) EX^{IUCN} since 1950s

Family Ursidae (bears)

- Polar bear (Ursus maritimus) VU^{IUCN}

== Order Chiroptera (bats) ==
Family Emballonuridae (sac-winged bats)

- Pacific sheath-tailed bat (Emballonura semicaudata) EN^{IUCN}

Family Molossidae (free-tailed bats)

- Florida bonneted bat (Eumops floridanus) VU^{IUCN}

Family Phyllostomidae (leaf-nosed bats)

- Mexican long-tongued bat (Choeronycteris mexicana) NT^{IUCN}
- Greater long-nosed bat (Leptonycteris nivalis) EN^{IUCN}
- Lesser long-nosed bat (Leptonycteris yerbabuenae) NT^{IUCN}
- Red fruit bat (Stenoderma rufum) NT^{IUCN}

Family Pteropodidae (megabats)

- Mariana fruit bat (Pteropus mariannus) EN^{IUCN}
- Samoa flying fox (Pteropus samoensis) NT^{IUCN}
- Guam flying fox (Pteropus tokudae) EX^{IUCN} since 1960s

Family Vespertilionidae (vesper bats)

- Gray bat (Myotis grisescens) NT^{IUCN}
- Indiana bat (Myotis sodalis) NT^{IUCN}

== Order Eulipotyphla (hedgehogs, shrews, moles, and solenodons) ==
Family Nesophontidae (West Indies shrews)

- Puerto Rican nesophontes (Nesophontes edithae) EX^{IUCN} since 1500s

Family Soricidae (shrews)

- Pribilof Island shrew (Sorex pribilofensis) EN^{IUCN}

== Order Lagomorpha (lagomorphs) ==
Family Leporidae (rabbits and hares)

- Columbia Basin pygmy rabbit (Brachylagus idahoensis) LC^{IUCN}
- White-sided jackrabbit (Lepus callotis) NT^{IUCN}
- European rabbit (Oryctolagus cuniculus) NT^{IUCN} (introduced from Western Europe)
- Appalachian cottontail (Sylvilagus obscurus) NT^{IUCN}
- Robust cottontail (Sylvilagus robustus) VU^{IUCN}
- New England cottontail (Sylvilagus transitionalis) VU^{IUCN}

== Order Rodentia (rodents) ==
Family Cricetidae (true hamsters, voles, lemmings, and New World rats and mice)

- Red tree vole (Arborimus longicaudus) NT^{IUCN}
- California red tree mouse (Arborimus pomo) NT^{IUCN}
- Beach vole (Microtus breweri) VU^{IUCN}
- Allegheny woodrat (Neotoma magister) NT^{IUCN}
- Florida mouse (Podomys floridanus) VU^{IUCN}
- Salt marsh harvest mouse (Reithrodontomys raviventris) EN^{IUCN}

Family Geomyidae (gophers)

- Desert pocket gopher (Geomys arenarius) NT^{IUCN}

Family Heteromyidae (heteromyids)

- Texas kangaroo rat (Dipodomys elator) VU^{IUCN}
- Giant kangaroo rat (Dipodomys ingens) EN^{IUCN}
- Fresno kangaroo rat (Dipodomys nitratoides) VU^{IUCN}
- Banner-tailed kangaroo rat (Dipodomys spectabilis) NT^{IUCN}
- Stephens's kangaroo rat (Dipodomys stephensi) EN^{IUCN}
- White-eared pocket mouse (Perognathus alticolus) EN^{IUCN}

Family Sciuridae (squirrels)

- San Joaquin antelope squirrel (Ammospermophilus nelsoni) EN^{IUCN}
- Utah prairie dog (Cynomys parvidens) EN^{IUCN}
- Palmer's chipmunk (Neotamias palmeri) EN^{IUCN}
- Idaho ground squirrel (Urocitellus brunneus) VU^{IUCN}
- Townsend's ground squirrel (Urocitellus townsendii) VU^{IUCN}
- Washington ground squirrel (Urocitellus washingtoni) NT^{IUCN}
- Mohave ground squirrel (Xerospermophilus mohavensis) NT^{IUCN}

== Order Sirenia (sea cows) ==
Family Dugongidae (dugong and Steller's sea cow)

- Steller's sea cow (Hydrodamalis gigas) EX^{IUCN} since 1760s

Family Trichechidae (manatees)

- West Indian manatee (Trichechus manatus) VU^{IUCN}
  - Florida manatee (T. m. latirostris) EN^{IUCN}
  - Antillean manatee (T. m. manatus) EN^{IUCN}

== See also ==
- List of mammals of the United States
