= Laurence M. Huey =

American zoologist

Laurence Markham Huey
- Huey photographing a tarantula colony, Baja California, 1925. From the photographic collection of the San Diego Natural History Museum Research Library.
- Born: September 6, 1892; San Diego, California
- Died: June 11, 1963 (aged 70); San Diego, California
- Scientific career
- Fields: Ornithology, Mammalogy
- Workplaces: San Diego Natural History Museum

Laurence Markham Huey (1892–1963) was an American zoologist and the Curator of Birds and Mammals at the San Diego Natural History Museum from 1923 to 1961. His main research field was the study of mammals and birds of California and Baja California. He also did field work on mammals and birds in Utah and Arizona, in particular at the Organ Pipe Cactus National Monument.

== Career ==
Huey was born on 6 September 1892 in Tijuana River Valley, San Diego, California. Of humble origins (Huey left school at 8th grade), he worked in a planing mill at age 15 and began his self-education in natural history. At 16, he became a Junior Member of the San Diego Society of Natural History.

During a trip to Coronado Island in 1913 he met the ornithologist and mammalogist Donald Ryder Dickey with whom he worked for the next ten years. In 1923 he became curator of mammals and birds at the San Diego Natural History Museum until he retired in 1961. From January 1946 to February 1947 he served as acting director of the museum.

Huey published over 200 articles, several of them in the ornithological journals The Auk and The Condor as well as in the Journal of Mammalogy, and the Transactions of the San Diego Society of Natural History. He described mammal species and subspecies from several families, including Dipodomys gravipes, Peromyscus crinitus pallidissimus, Perognathus alticolus inexpectatus, Dipodomys panamintinus argusensis, Perognathus longimembris internationalis, and Sylvilagus bachmani howelli. He also described some bird taxa, including Nyctanassa violacea bancrofti, Cardinalis cardinalis seftoni, Egretta tricolor occidentalis, and Megascops kennicottii cardonensis. Overall he is named as author or co-author of 84 species and subspecies.

== Professional Societies ==
At age 16, Huey became a junior member of the San Diego Society of Natural History and in 1923 became a charter member of the Fellows of the Society. He later served terms as president and secretary. He was a member of the American Ornithologists' Union from 1920 (an elective member from 1932). Other professional memberships included the Cooper Ornithological Society, the Wilson Ornithological Society, the American Society of Mammalogists, the Society of Systematic Zoology, and the Biological Society of Washington.

He died in San Diego, California on 11 June 1963.
