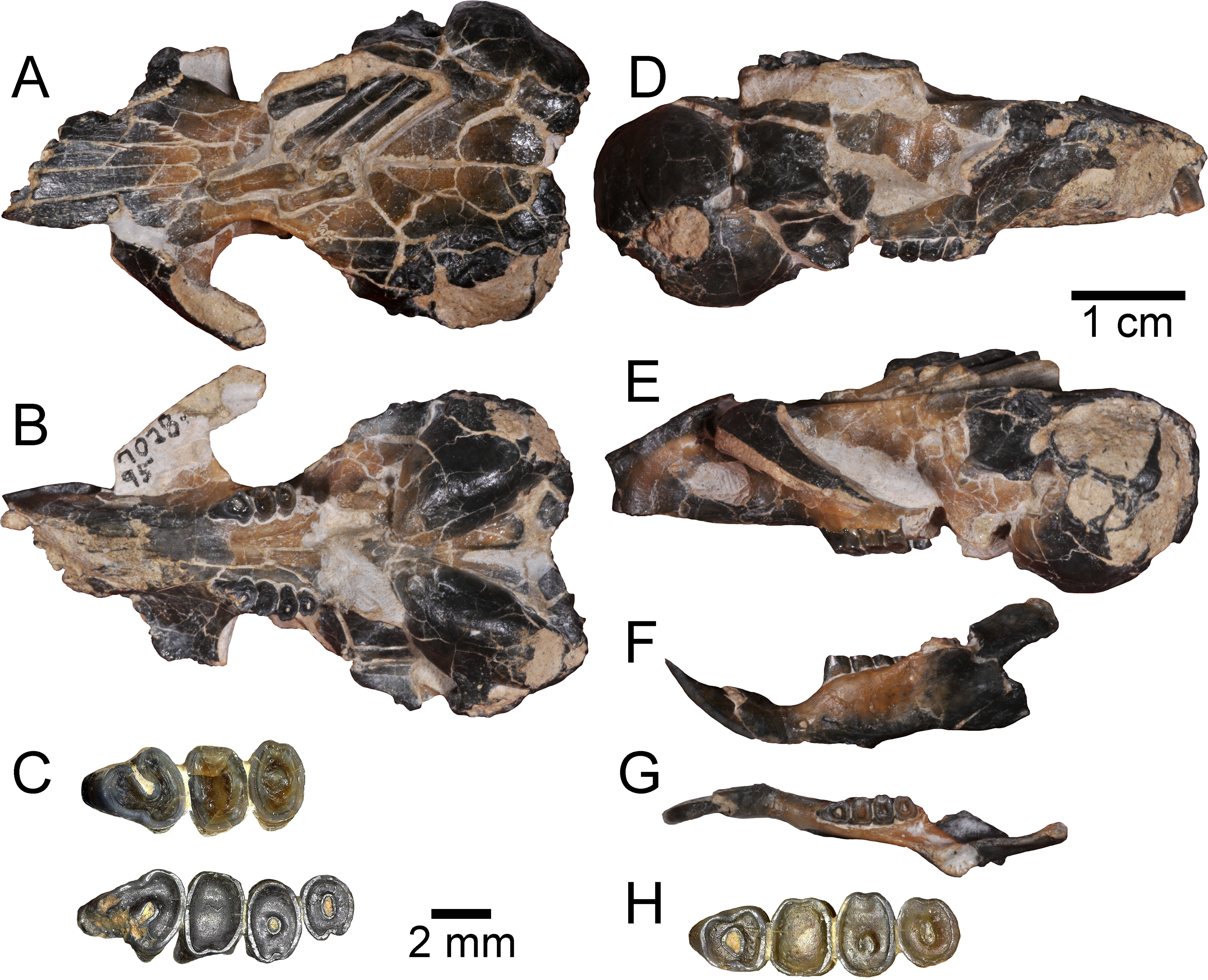
- Skull and teeth of Aurimys xeros

Scientific classification
- Kingdom: Animalia
- Phylum: Chordata
- Class: Mammalia
- Infraclass: Placentalia
- Order: Rodentia
- Family: Heteromyidae
- Subfamily: Dipodomyinae
- Genus: †Aurimys; Samuels et al., 2023

Type species
- † Aurimys xeros Samuels et al., 2023

= Aurimys =

Extinct genus of rodent

Aurimys is an extinct genus of rodent from the Early Miocene of North America containing one species, Aurimys xeros. It was described in 2023 from a specimen found in the Johnson Canyon Member of the John Day Formation in Oregon, United States. The material of the type specimen consists of a mostly complete skull, some foot bones, and a caudal vertebra. The skull, which is about 48.50 millimeters (1.909 in) in length, was noted for its prominent auditory bullae. Based on the skull's size, it is estimated to have been the largest member of its family, the Heteromyidae. In life, it is believed to have been omnivorous, with a diet consisting mainly of plants, and, unlike its living relatives, quadrupedal. It is one of numerous mammals known from the Johnson Canyon Member.

== Discovery and naming ==
Aurimys was described in 2023 by the paleontologists Joshua X. Samuels, Jonathan Calede, and Robert Hunt Jr. from remains found at the Johnson Canyon Member of the John Day Formation in Oregon, United States. The authors estimated the specimen to be 22.746 ± 0.146 years old, based on radiometric dating of nearby sanidine. They wrote that the radiometry, in addition to biostratigraphic and magnetostratigraphic factors, definitively supported an Early Miocene age, corresponding to the late or latest Arikareean in the North American land mammal ages chronology. The type species, which the researchers identified as the only species in the genus, was named Aurimys xeros. The genus name comes from the Greek words auri (lit. 'ear'), in reference to the prominent auditory bullae surrounding parts of the middle and inner ear) of dipodomyines (members of the subfamily to which Aurimys was assigned), and mys (lit. 'mouse'), while the specific epithet, xeros, is the Greek word for 'arid', in reference to the preferred habitats of dipodomyines. Aurimys xeros is the 57th species of rodent known from the John Day Formation.

== Description ==
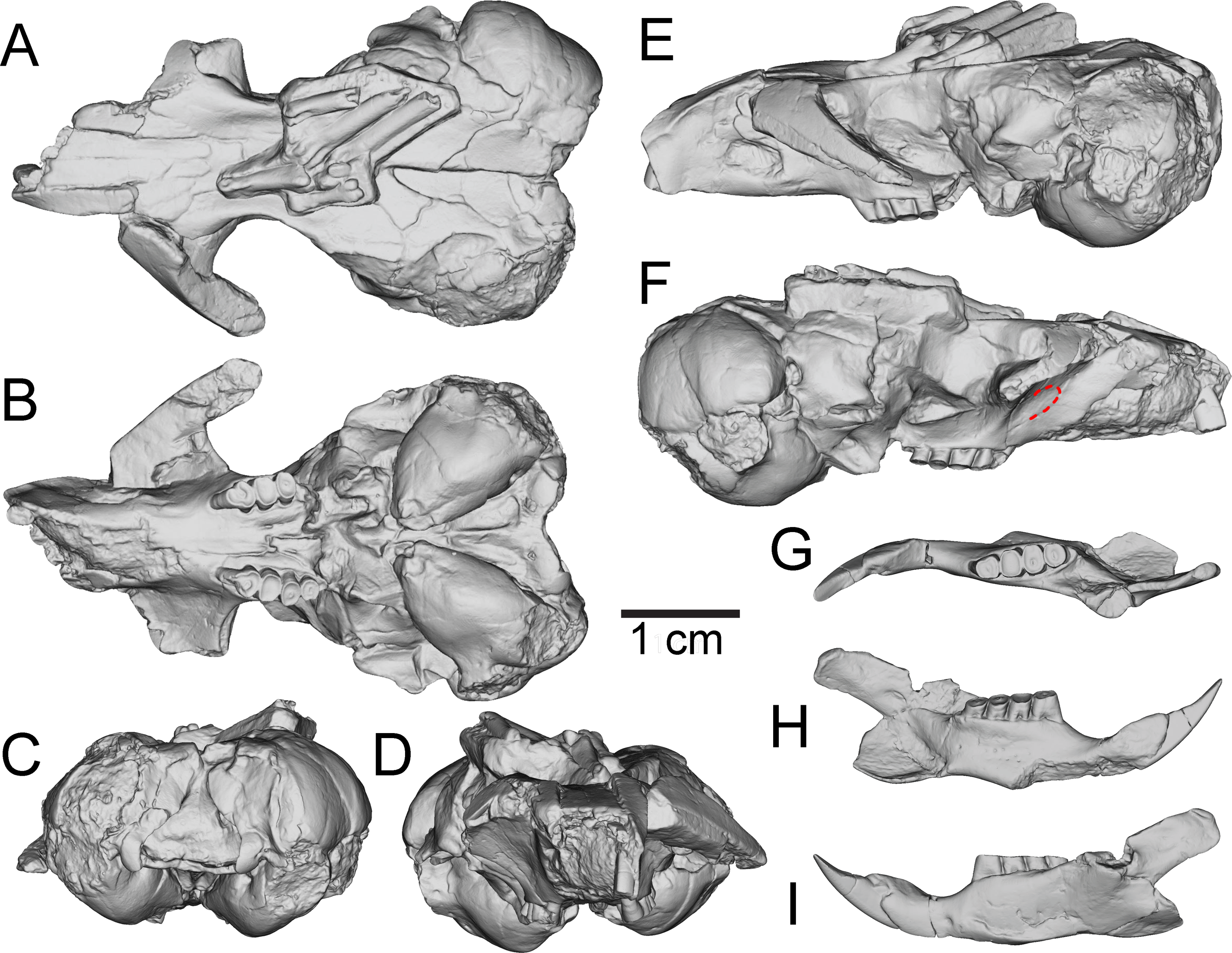
Reconstructions of the skull of Aurimys based on micro-CT data

The type specimen of Aurimys consists of a skull with some foot bones (three incomplete metatarsals and two complete proximal phalanges) and a caudal vertebra preserved on top of it. The proximal phalanges are complete and fairly slender, while the rest of the postcranial material is poorly preserved and cannot be morphologically compared with that of other dipodomyines. The large size and robustness of the caudal vertebra suggest a position near the front of the tail, but the poor preservation prevents a more definitive assessment. The skull is mostly complete but slightly fractured throughout, missing the frontal ends of both nasal bones, most of the right premaxilla at the tip of the upper jaw, parts of the zygomatic arches (part of the cheekbone), parts of both auditory bullae, parts of the basioccipital, most of the digastric process of the mandible, and the coronoid process of the mandible. The lower dentition is fully intact and the upper dentition is mostly so, but both are heavily worn. The entire skull is 48.50 millimeters (1.909 in) in length.

Samuels and colleagues wrote that the skull's most prominent feature was its inflated auditory bullae and adjacent mastoid (the back part of the temporal bone). They described the cranium as "dominated" by the ear regions, with each almost as large as the braincase and extending past the occipital bone (bone at the lower-rear of the skull). The ear canal is large and round. The skull contains many preserved foramina (openings to allow the passage of soft tissue). No cavities of any kind are present in front of the bullae or between the bullae and the basioccipital.

The rostrum narrows towards the front on all sides. The nasals descend in the same direction, themselves extending past the premaxillae and the edge of the eye sockets. The top of the skull, made up of the frontal and parietal bones, is mostly flat, with prominent ridges above the orbits. The interparietal bone, above the occipital bone, is wide but constrained by the inflated auditory bullae. The front and upper part of the temporal bone is located above the auditory bullae and diminishes to a thin bar at its furthest rear. The basioccipital is extremely narrowed.

The upper incisor is convex on its front side and has no central groove. It is wider front-to-back than left-to-right. The upper cheek teeth are medium-sized and rooted, with a continuous layer of enamel over their crowns. The upper cheek teeth decrease in size from the front of the mouth; the first premolar is larger than the molars. Wear has led to the loss of some morphological features, but others are preserved: all are evidently bilophodont, possessing four interconnected cusps that join to form a central peak. The lower incisor shares the convexity and front-to-back direction of width of the upper incisor. The lower cheek teeth are also medium-sized and rooted, and they too decrease in size with position, barring the premolar, which is slightly smaller than the first molar. Most are visibly bilophodont, with the exception of the heavily worn first molar, which is indeterminant. The angle of the mandible is large and inclined towards the center of the body.

== Classification ==
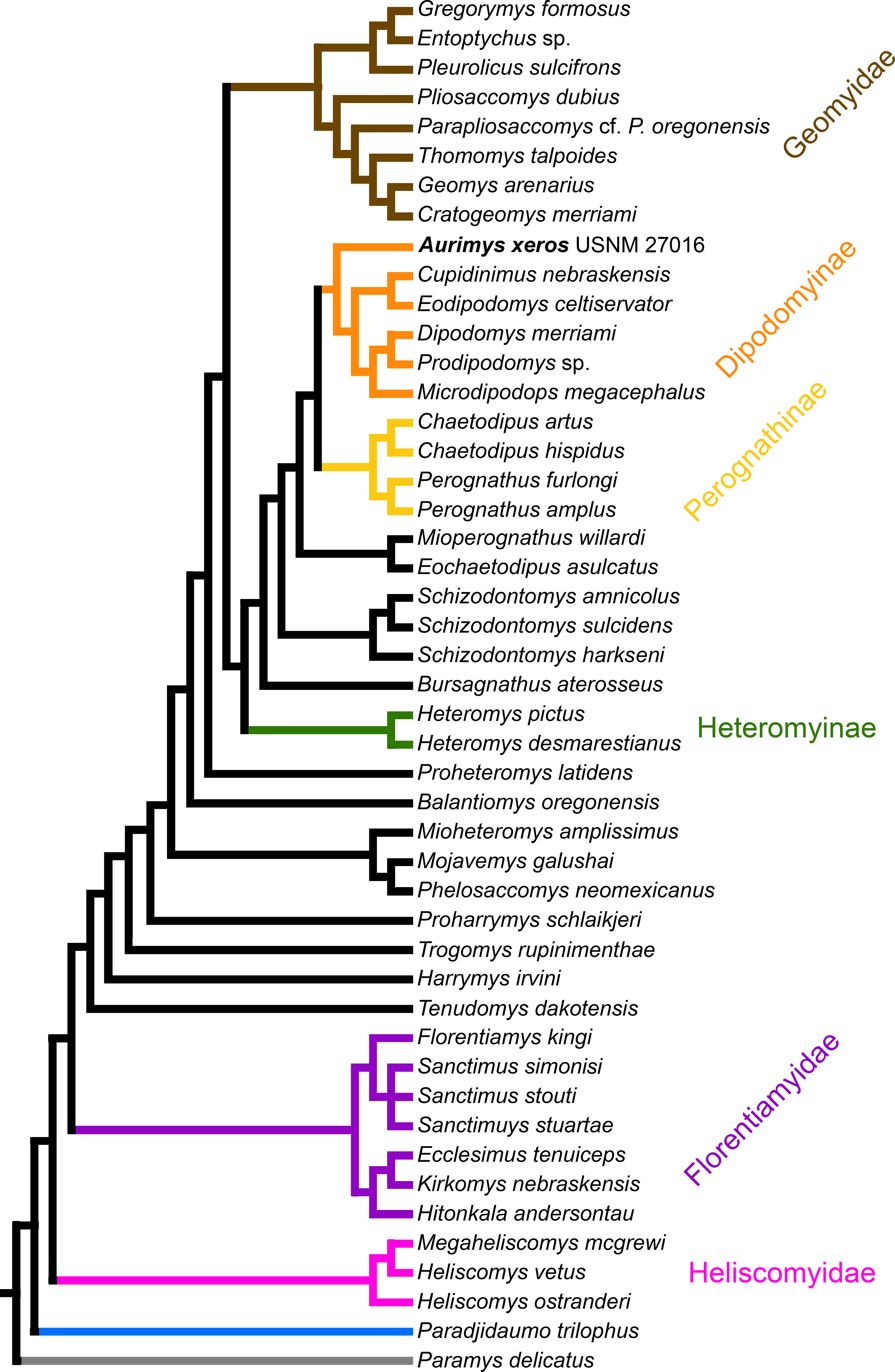
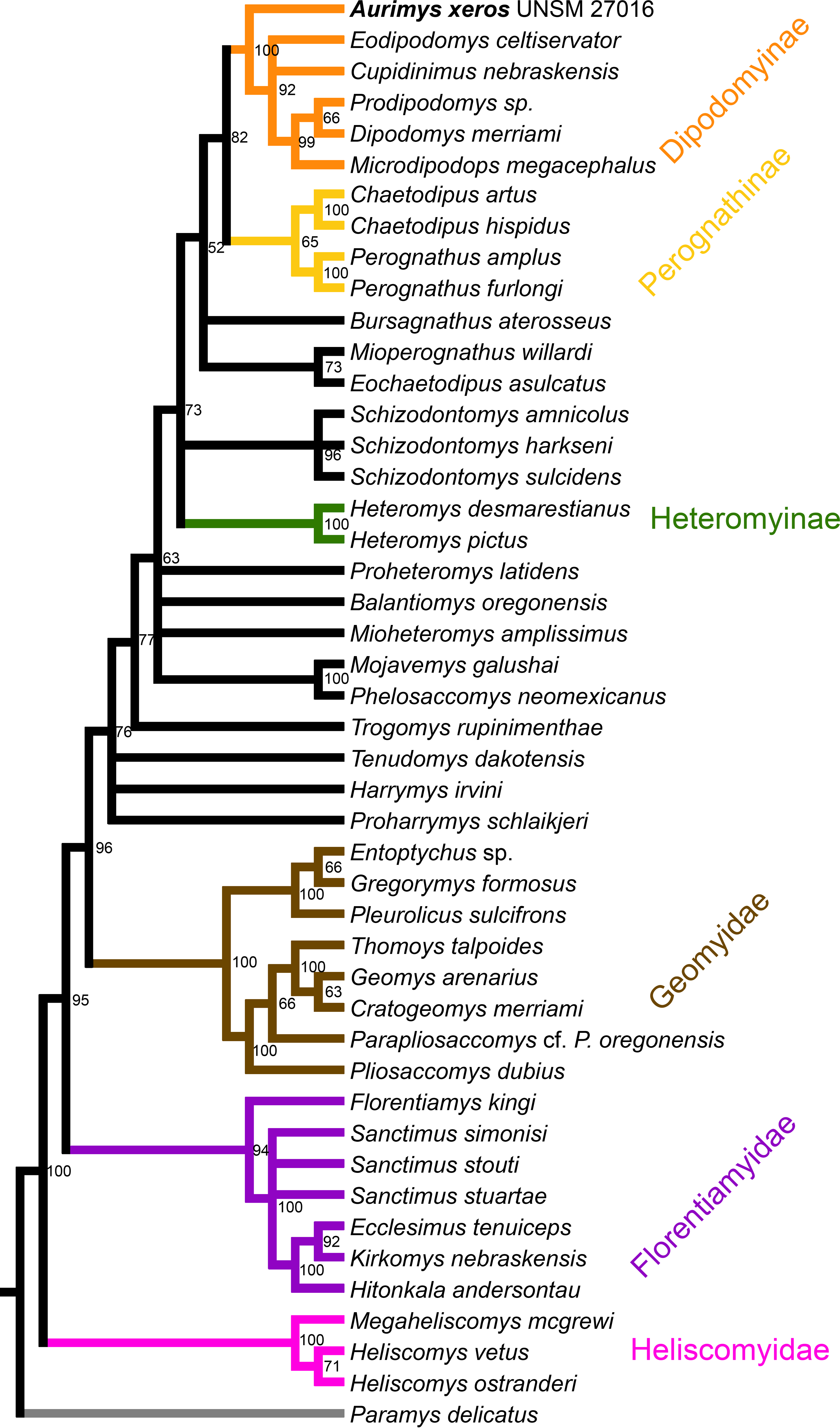
Results of parsimony (left) and Bayesian (right) analyses of the phylogeny of Aurimys

Samuels and colleagues placed Aurimys in the subfamily Dipodomyinae of the family Heteromyidae. Heteromyidae contains pocket mice, kangaroo rats, and their relatives, and is represented by around 60 living species. Aurimys represents the largest known member of its family. The researchers sampled representatives from several related families, all proposed subfamilies of Heteromyidae, and every genus of Dipodomyinae in order to classify Aurimys and better understand relationships within Heteromyidae, including those between extinct and living taxa. Two more distantly related rodents were used as outgroups: Paramys delicatus, one of the oldest rodents in North America, and Paradjidaumo trilophus, possibly a sister taxon to Geomorpha — the clade containing Heteromyidae and Geomyidae (pocket gophers). Relationships were evaluated through both parsimony and Bayesian analyses. Despite differences in overall results, both analyses placed Aurimys as the earliest diverging member of a clade containing all extinct and living members of Dipodomyinae. This placement was supported by a 2023 study of rodent skull morphology published as part of an undergraduate research thesis and in a 2025 consensus tree of Geomorpha published in the Journal of Systematic Palaeontology.

Aurimys contains features found in extinct and living dipodomyines and of the perognathines, another subfamily of Heteromyidae, in a unique combination. The inflation of both the auditory bullae and mastoid is a characteristic only seen in dipodomyines, while the fusion of the buccinator and masticator foramina, both associated with the cheek area, is a feature absent in both modern subfamilies, but present in the extinct Schizodontomys, Mioheteromys, Balantiomys, and Proheteromys. The tapering of the rostrum and the upward projection of the frontal bone between the premaxilla and jugal are common in modern heteromyids, including dipodomyines, but neither are consistently present in their fossil relatives.

Another distinguishing feature of the type specimen of Aurimys is the structure of the zygomatic arches at their point of connection with the upper jaw: alongside the premolars rather than in front of them, as they are in living perognathines and some living dipodomyines, and in front of the endpoints of the nasals and premaxillae rather than alongside or behind them, as they are in all other evaluated perognathines and dipodomyines except Eochaetodipus. There is no bony rim above the eye sockets as in some early heteromyids, but unlike that in Schizodontomys and in the living subfamilies of Heteromyidae. The reduced squamous part of the temporal bone bears resemblance to that of living perognathines and Schizodontomys but not to that of living heteromyines and dipodomyines. The interparietal is somewhat constricted in response to the large auditory bullae as in the extinct Eodipodomys and Cupidinimus, but not to the extent seen in living dipodomyines and unlike in Schizodontomys and perognathines, which lack this constriction altogether.

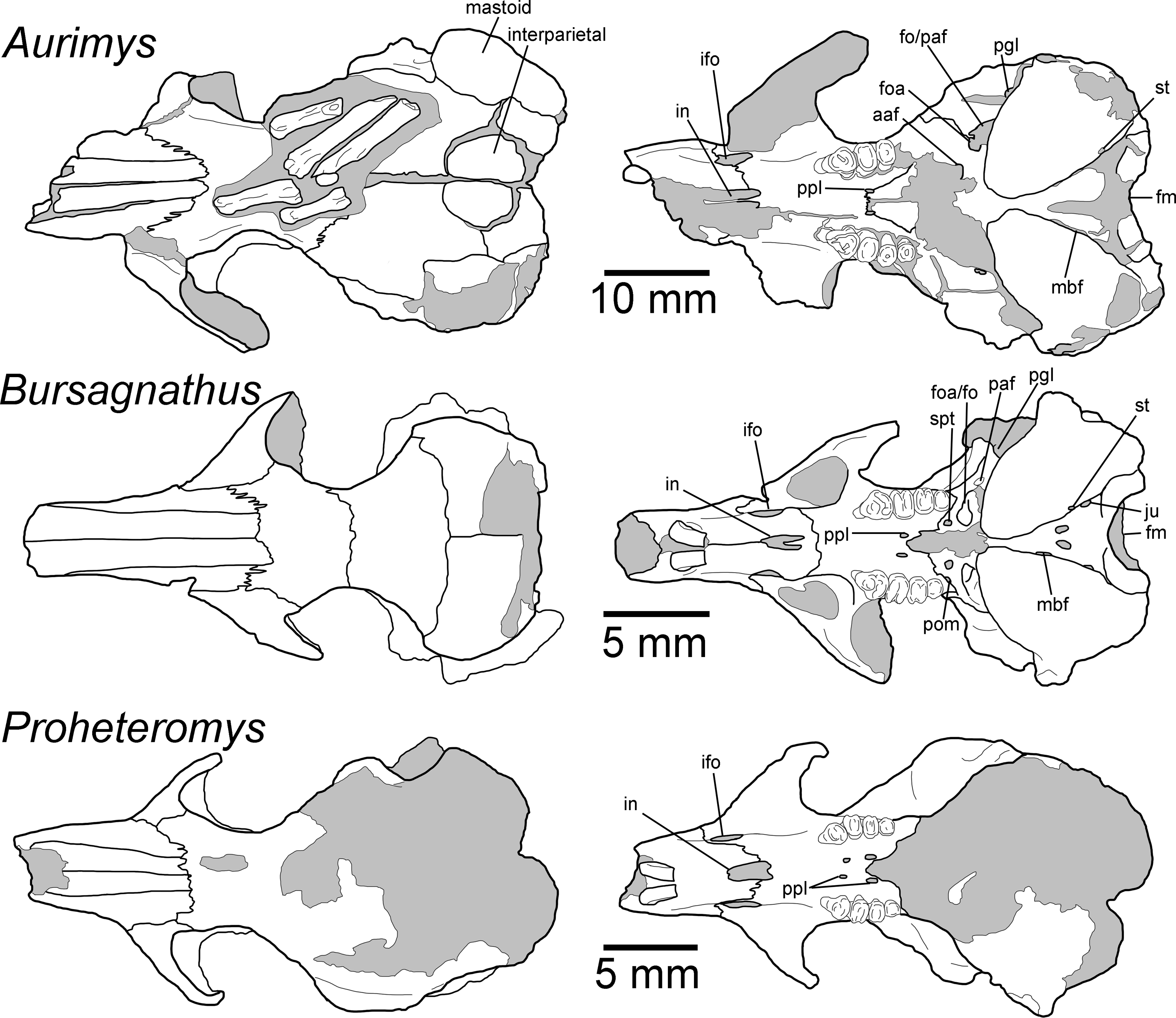
Comparison of the skull of Aurimys with those of select relatives

The lack of a central groove in the upper incisors is similar to early dipodomyines and perognathines, but dissimilar to later members of both groups. The continuous layer of enamel on the teeth is similar to that of living perognathines and some living dipodomyines. The presence of a small foramen between the third molar and the coronoid process is seen in living dipodomyines but is absent in all other living heteromyids. The teeth of Aurimys are larger than those of the largest living heteromyids, and the width of the proximal phalanx of its third digit is wider than that of any of the heteromyids studied, extinct or living. Samuels and colleagues interpreted Aurimys as walking on all fours, in contrast to the bipedal hopping locomotion of living dipodomyines. They speculated that ancestral dipodomyines were large-bodied and quadrupedal, with bipedalism and hopping arising before the diversification of their living representatives.

== Paleoecology ==
Samuels and colleagues proposed that Aurimys had an omnivorous diet consisting mainly of plant matter as do living dipodomyines and perognathines, with which Aurimys shares numerous morphological features. They suggested that future study of Aurimys and other fossil heteromyids could shed more light on the ancestral ecology of the family. Other mammals recovered from the Johnson Canyon Member include Paroreodon (an oreodont); Paratylopus cameloides (a camel); Hesperhys (a peccary); an unidentified dromomerycid; Parablastomeryx (a moschid deer); Archaeohippus and Anchitherium (equids); Moropus oregonensis (a small chalicothere); Diceratherium and a small species of Menoceras (rhinoceroses); Miotapirus harrisonensis (a tapir); Schizodontomys and Mylagaulodon (rodents); Cynarctoides and Desmocyon thomsoni (small canids); and temnocyonines belonging to the extinct carnivoran family Amphicyonidae.

== See also ==
- List of the Cenozoic life of Oregon
