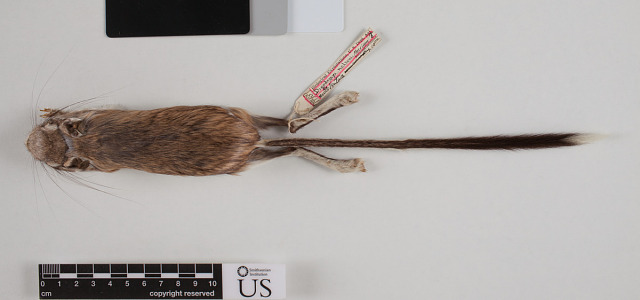

Conservation status
- Least Concern (IUCN 3.1)

Scientific classification
- Kingdom: Animalia
- Phylum: Chordata
- Class: Mammalia
- Order: Rodentia
- Family: Heteromyidae
- Genus: Dipodomys
- Species: D. nelsoni

Binomial name
- Dipodomys nelsoni Merriam, 1907

= Nelson's kangaroo rat =

Species of rodent

Nelson's kangaroo rat (Dipodomys nelsoni) is a species of rodent in the family Heteromyidae which is endemic to the central plateau of Mexico.

== Description ==
Nelson's kangaroo rat reaches a length of about 315 mm (12.4 in) including a tail of about 188 mm (7.4 in) and is one of the largest species in the genus. The upper parts are pale brown with some dark-tipped hairs on the head, along the spine and on the rump, and the underparts are white. The tail has a white stripe on either side along two thirds of its length, and the terminal third is bushy, black with a white tip. Nelson's kangaroo rat is similar in appearance to the banner-tailed kangaroo rat (Dipodomys spectabilis) but is smaller in size, weighing on average 87 grams (3.1 oz) to the banner-tail's 125 grams (4.4 oz).

== Distribution and habitat ==
Nelson's kangaroo rat is endemic to the Mexican Altiplano, a large upland area between the mountain ranges of the Sierra Madre Occidental and the Sierra Madre Oriental. Its typical habitat is rolling grassland or semiarid areas with scattered trees and shrubs such as Acacia, Prosopis juliflora, Larrea tridentata, Fouquieria splendens, cactus, Yucca and Agave.

== Ecology ==
Nelson's kangaroo rat creates a complex burrow system with several entrances which are surrounded by a distinctive large, low-domed mound. Some burrows are alongside roads and the entrances can be found in the sides of banks or ditches. Other burrows are surrounded by a strip of bare ground twenty metres (yards) or so wide. An attempt to dig out a burrow was largely unsuccessful with passages disappearing laterally and down through the subsurface rock layer, and no nests, food or fecal pellets being found in the excavated part of the burrow.

The diet of this species consists of plant foods including seeds. Breeding takes place throughout the year but mostly in the spring and summer. Captures of pregnant females suggest that litters consist of two young.

== Status ==
Nelson's kangaroo rat has a wide range in central Mexico where it is generally uncommon, being present at an estimated density of 9–20 individuals per hectare. The total population is presumed to be large and it faces no particular threats so the International Union for Conservation of Nature (IUCN) has listed it as being of "least concern".
