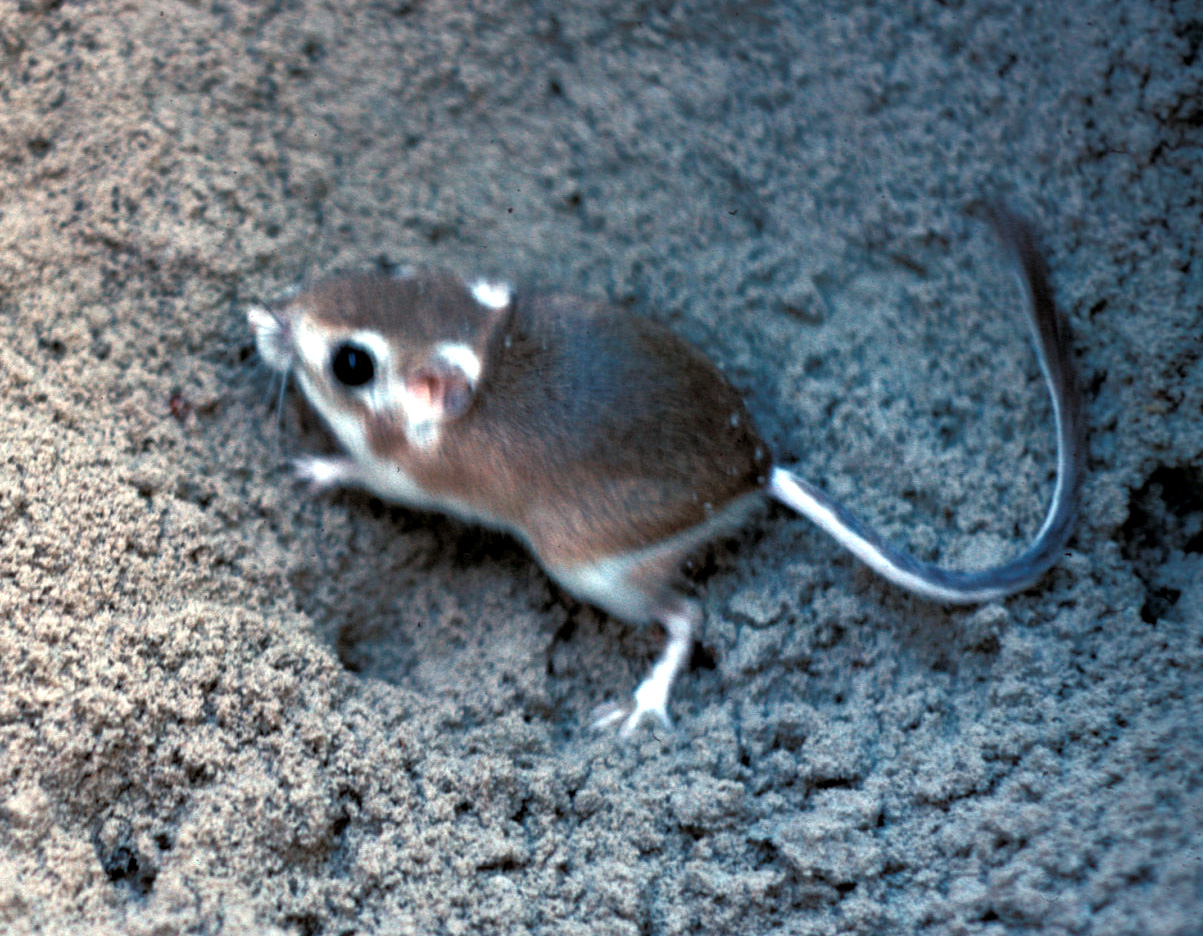

Conservation status
- Least Concern (IUCN 3.1)

Scientific classification
- Kingdom: Animalia
- Phylum: Chordata
- Class: Mammalia
- Order: Rodentia
- Family: Heteromyidae
- Genus: Dipodomys
- Species: D. compactus

Binomial name
- Dipodomys compactus F. W. True, 1889

= Gulf Coast kangaroo rat =

Species of rodent

The Gulf Coast kangaroo rat (Dipodomys compactus) is a species of rodent in the family Heteromyidae found in Mexico and the state of Texas in the United States. Its appearance and ecology are very similar to those of its putative sister species, Ord's kangaroo rat.

== Description ==
Adult Gulf Coast kangaroo rats are about 220 mm (8.7 in) long including a tail of about 120 mm (4.7 in). There are two distinct color forms, an ashy gray and a reddish- or yellowish-buff. In both cases the purest color is on the sides and flanks with hairs in the dorsal region having dark tips giving a blackish sheen. The cheeks are white and the ears and upper and lower tail stripes are brown. This species is generally paler in color than other kangaroo rats and can be distinguished from the Ord's kangaroo rat by its shorter, uncrested tail and its shorter, coarser fur.

== Distribution ==
The Gulf Coast kangaroo rat is found in southeastern Texas, southwards from Bexar and Gonzales counties, and in Zapata County, in Mustang Island and Padre Island, just off the coast of Texas, and in the barrier islands off the state of Tamaulipas in Mexico.

== Ecology ==
The Gulf Coast kangaroo rat is mainly nocturnal and feeds on seeds which it collects in its cheek pouches and carries back to its burrow. It lives in sparsely-vegetated locations with sandy soils, often among dunes and normally on the down-wind slope of a dune. Plants found growing in the vicinity include sea oats (Uniola paniculata), bluestem grass (Andropogon), saltgrass (Distichlis), fringe-rushes (Fimbristylis), sunflowers (Helianthus) and croton (Croton). In sparse mesquite (Prosopis) savannah in Texas it is associated with wiregrasses (Aristida), hairy grama (Bouteloua hirsuta) and hooded windmill grass (Chloris cucullata), as well as prickly pear (Opuntia).

== Status ==
The population trend of the Gulf Coast kangaroo rat appears to be steady and no particular threats have been identified. In suitable habitat it is quite common and the IUCN has listed it as being of "least concern".
