= Kangaroo Mountain (California) =

Mountain in California, United States

- Location within California

Highest point
- Elevation: 6,697 ft (2,041 m) NAVD 88
- Prominence: 814 ft (248 m)
- Coordinates: 41°55′13″N 123°11′58″W

Geography
- Location: Siskiyou County, California, U.S.
- Parent range: Siskiyou Mountains
- Topo map: USGS Kangaroo Mountain

Kangaroo Mountain is a low mountain in the Klamath Mountains, in Siskiyou County, far northwestern California. It is about 6 miles (9.7 km) south of California-Oregon border.

== Geography ==
With an elevation of 6,697 feet (2,041 m), Kangaroo Mountain is the 1581st highest summit in the state of California. The summit marks the southern boundary of the Red Buttes Wilderness which is administered by the Rogue River – Siskiyou National Forest. The Pacific Crest Trail traverses the mountain's southern flank.

It was likely named after the California kangaroo rat.
