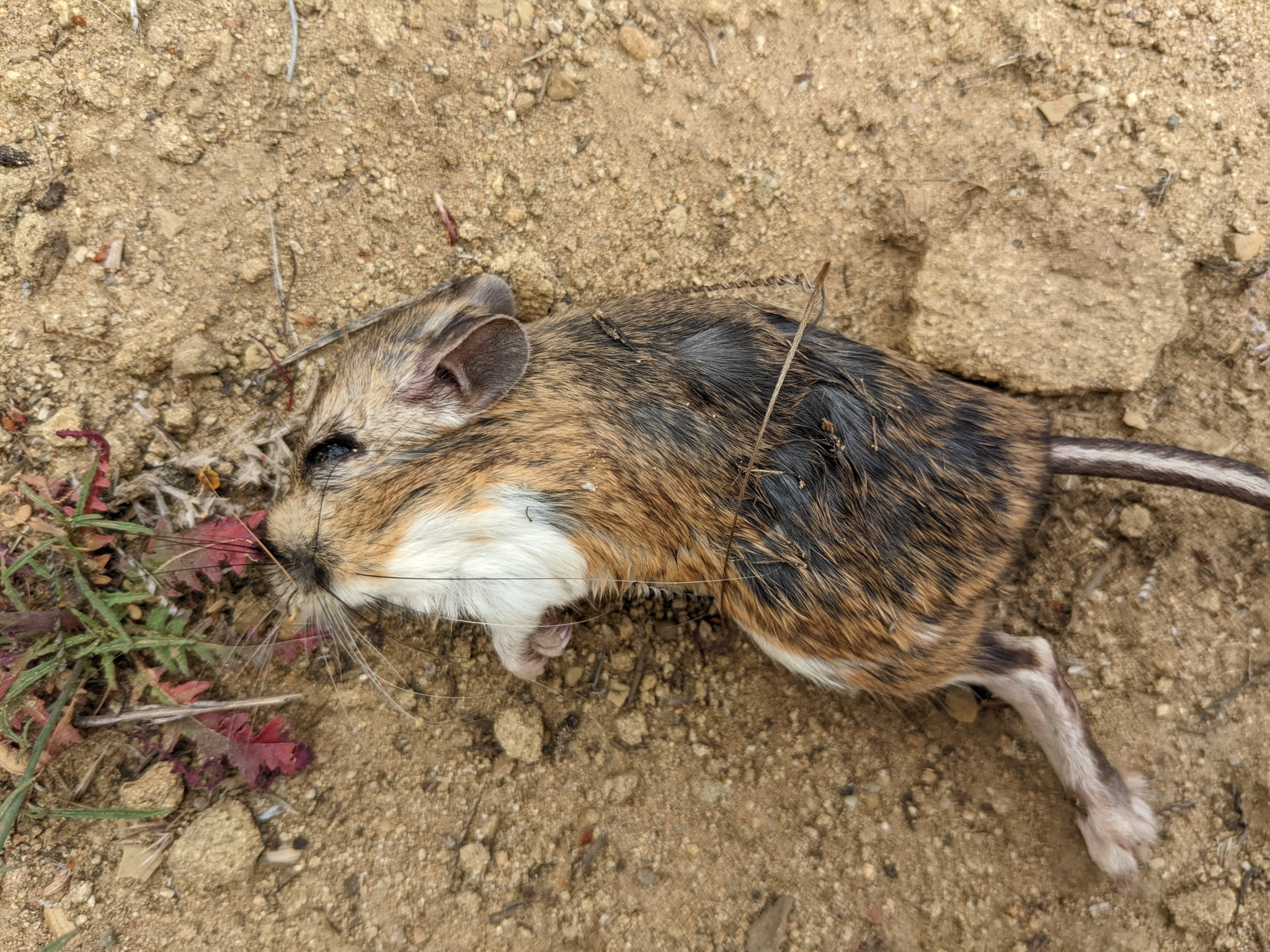

Conservation status
- Least Concern (IUCN 3.1)

Scientific classification
- Kingdom: Animalia
- Phylum: Chordata
- Class: Mammalia
- Order: Rodentia
- Family: Heteromyidae
- Genus: Dipodomys
- Species: D. agilis

Binomial name
- Dipodomys agilis Gambel, 1848

Subspecies
- D. a. agilis; D. a. perplexus
- IUCN Red List range map for Dipodomys agilis, Version 2021-2

= Agile kangaroo rat =

Species of rodent

The agile kangaroo rat (Dipodomys agilis) is a species of rodent in the family Heteromyidae. It is endemic to southern California in the United States. In the 1980s, it was classified as monotypic, though later studies have recognized two subspecies.

Relatively little information has been published on the natural history, life history, ecology, or behavior of the agile kangaroo rat. The species appears to be part of the Californian kangaroo rat radiation, which is derived from a common ancestor with Ord's kangaroo rat. An observational study found distinct habitat differences between the agile and Stephens's kangaroo rats, with the agile preferring more shrubs and lighter soils.

== Taxonomy ==
William Gambel proposed the scientific name Dipodomys agilis for a jerboa-like animal from Los Angeles in 1848. The agile kangaroo rat and other kangaroo rats are classified in the family Heteromyidae. The closest relatives of this family are the pocket gophers.

=== Subspecies ===
After Gambel's description of the agile kangaroo rat, several agile kangaroo rat subspecies were described. The authors of the taxonomic authority Mammal Species of the World recognized two subspecies in 2005 with one synonym each.

- D. a. agilis Gambel, 1848 includes wagneri proposed by Le Conte in 1853
- D. a. perplexus (Merriam, 1907) includes fuscus proposed by Boulware in 1943

A 1983 observation of specimens from 34 populations concluded this species is monotypic, however newer research by Troy L. Best and Robert Miles Sullivan has concluded these two subspecies are valid taxa. The Dulzura kangaroo rat, which overlaps in range with the agile kangaroo rat, was believed to be a subspecies of the agile kangaroo rat following Joseph Grinnell's classification in 1922, though subsequent studies have confirmed the latter's status as a unique species.

== Description ==
The agile kangaroo rat exhibits sexual dimorphism; most male agile kangaroo rat specimens are larger than their female counterparts. This species is intermediate in size when compared with other kangaroo rat species and has larger ears alongside five toes.
