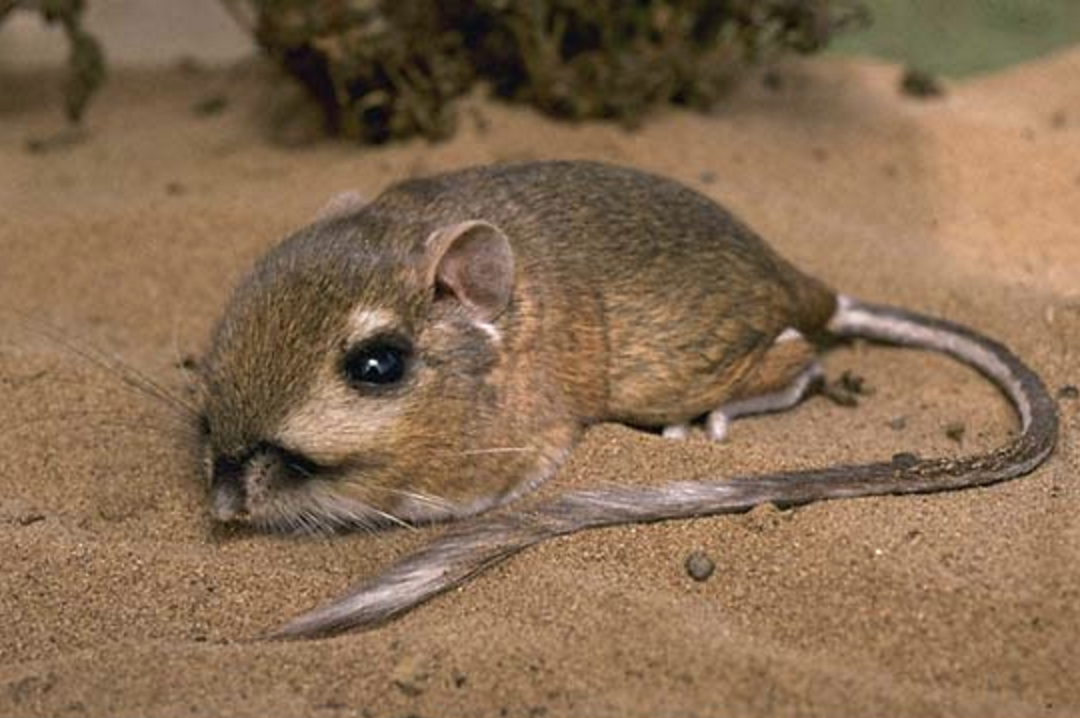

Scientific classification
- Kingdom: Animalia
- Phylum: Chordata
- Class: Mammalia
- Order: Rodentia
- Family: Heteromyidae
- Subfamily: Dipodomyinae
- Genus: Dipodomys; J. E. Gray, 1841

Type species
- Dipodomys phillipsii J. E. Gray, 1841

Species
- Dipodomys agilis Dipodomys californicus Dipodomys compactus Dipodomys deserti Dipodomys elator Dipodomys gravipes Dipodomys heermanni Dipodomys ingens Dipodomys merriami Dipodomys microps Dipodomys nelsoni Dipodomys nitratoides Dipodomys ordii Dipodomys panamintinus Dipodomys phillipsii Dipodomys simulans Dipodomys spectabilis Dipodomys stephensi Dipodomys venustus
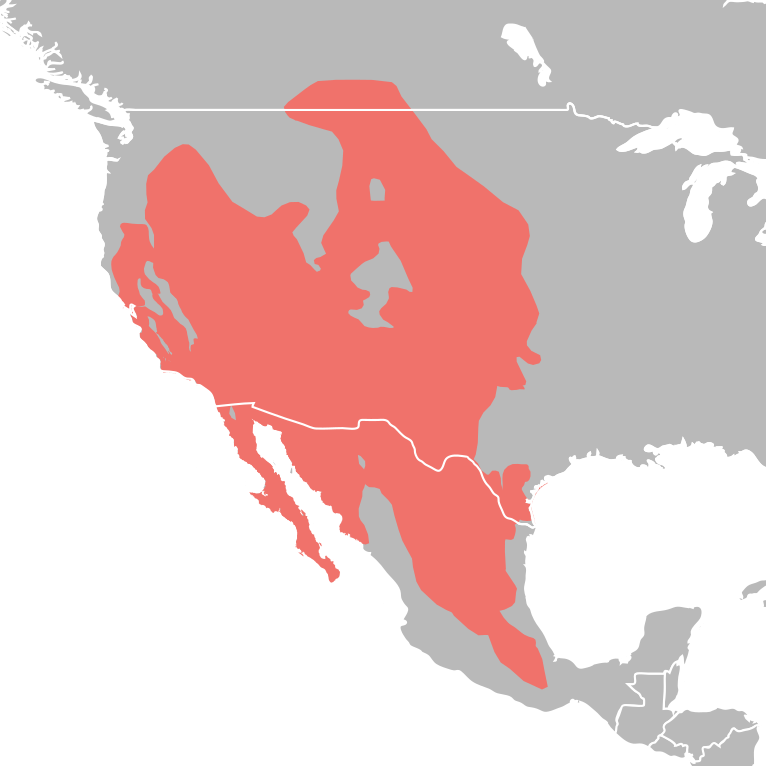
- Dipodomys distribution

Synonyms
- Dipodops Merriam, 1890; Perodipus Fitzinger, 1867; Macrocolus Wagner, 1846

= Kangaroo rat =

Kangaroo rat Temporal range: Late Pliocene – Recent

Genus of rodents

Kangaroo rats, small mostly nocturnal rodents of genus Dipodomys, are native to arid areas of western North America. The common name derives from their bipedal form. They hop in a manner similar to the much larger kangaroo, but developed this mode of locomotion independently, like several other clades of rodents (e.g., dipodids and hopping mice).

== Description ==
Kangaroo rats are four- or five-toed heteromyid rodents with big hind legs, small front legs, and relatively large heads. Adults typically weigh between 70 and 170 grams (2.5–6.0 oz). The tail of a kangaroo rat is longer than its body and head combined. Another notable feature of kangaroo rats is their fur-lined cheek pouches, which are used for storing food. The coloration of kangaroo rats varies from cinnamon buff to dark gray, depending on the species. There is also some variation in length with one of the largest species, the banner-tailed kangaroo rat being 150 millimetres (6 in) in body length and a tail length of 200 millimetres (8 in). Sexual dimorphism exists in all species, with males being larger than females.

=== Locomotion ===
Kangaroo rats move bipedally. Kangaroo rats often leap a distance of 7 feet, and reportedly up to 9 feet (2.75 m) at speeds up to almost 10 feet/sec, or 11 km/h (7 mph). They can quickly change direction between jumps. The rapid locomotion of the banner-tailed kangaroo rat may maximise energy cost and minimise predation risk. Its use of a "move-freeze" mode may also make it less conspicuous to nocturnal predators.

== Ecology ==
=== Range and habitat ===
Kangaroo rats live in arid and semiarid areas of western North America, particularly on sandy or soft soils which are suitable for burrowing. They can, however, vary in both geographic range and habitat. Their elevation range depends on the species; they are found from below sea level to at least 7,100 feet (the type locality of D. ordii priscus). They are sensitive to extreme temperatures and remain in their burrows during rain storms and other forms of inclement weather. Kangaroo rats are preyed on by coyotes, foxes, badgers, weasels, owls, and snakes.

Merriam's kangaroo rats live in areas of high rainfall and humidity, and high summer temperature and evaporation rates. They prefer areas of stony soils, including clays, gravel, and rocks, which are harder than soils preferred by some other species (like banner-tailed kangaroo rats). Because their habitats are hot and dry, they must conserve water. They do this in part by lowering their metabolic rate, which reduces the loss of water through their skin and respiratory system. Evaporation through the skin is the major route of loss. Merriam's kangaroo rats obtain enough water from the metabolic oxidation of the seeds they eat to survive and do not need to drink water at all. To help conserve water they produce very concentrated urine, via a process apparently associated with expression of aquaporin 1 along a longer than usual segment of the descending limb of the loop of Henle in the kidney.

In contrast, banner-tailed kangaroo rats have more specific habitat requirements for desert grasslands with scattered shrubs; this species is also more threatened because of the decline in these grasslands. These are also dry areas but they tend to have more water available to them than Merriam's kangaroo rats.

=== Food and foraging ===
Kangaroo rats are primarily seed eaters. They will, however, eat vegetation occasionally, and at some times of the year, possibly insects as well. They have been seen storing the seeds of mesquite, creosote bush, purslane, ocotillo, and grama grass in their cheek pouches. Kangaroo rats will store extra seeds in seed caches. This caching behavior affects the rangeland and croplands where the animals live. Kangaroo rats must harvest as much seed as possible in as little time as possible. To conserve energy and water, they minimize their time away from their cool, dry burrows. In addition, maximizing time in their burrows minimizes their exposure to predators.

When on foraging trips, kangaroo rats hoard the seeds that they find. It is important for a kangaroo rat to encounter more food items than are consumed, at least at one point in the year, as well as defend or rediscover food caches and remain within the same areas long enough to utilize food resources. Different species of kangaroo rat may have different seed caching strategies to coexist with each other, as is the case for the banner-tailed kangaroo rat and Merriam's kangaroo rat which have overlapping ranges. Merriam's kangaroo rats scatterhoard small caches of seeds in numerous small, shallow holes they dig. This is initially done close to the food source, maximizing harvest rates and reducing travel costs, but later redistributed more widely, minimizing theft by other rodents. Banner-tailed kangaroo rats larderhoard a sizable cache of seeds within the large mounds they occupy. This could decrease their time and energy expenses; they also spend less time on the surface digging holes, reducing the risk of predation. Being larger and more sedentary, they are better able to defend these larders from depredations by other rodents.

== Behavior ==
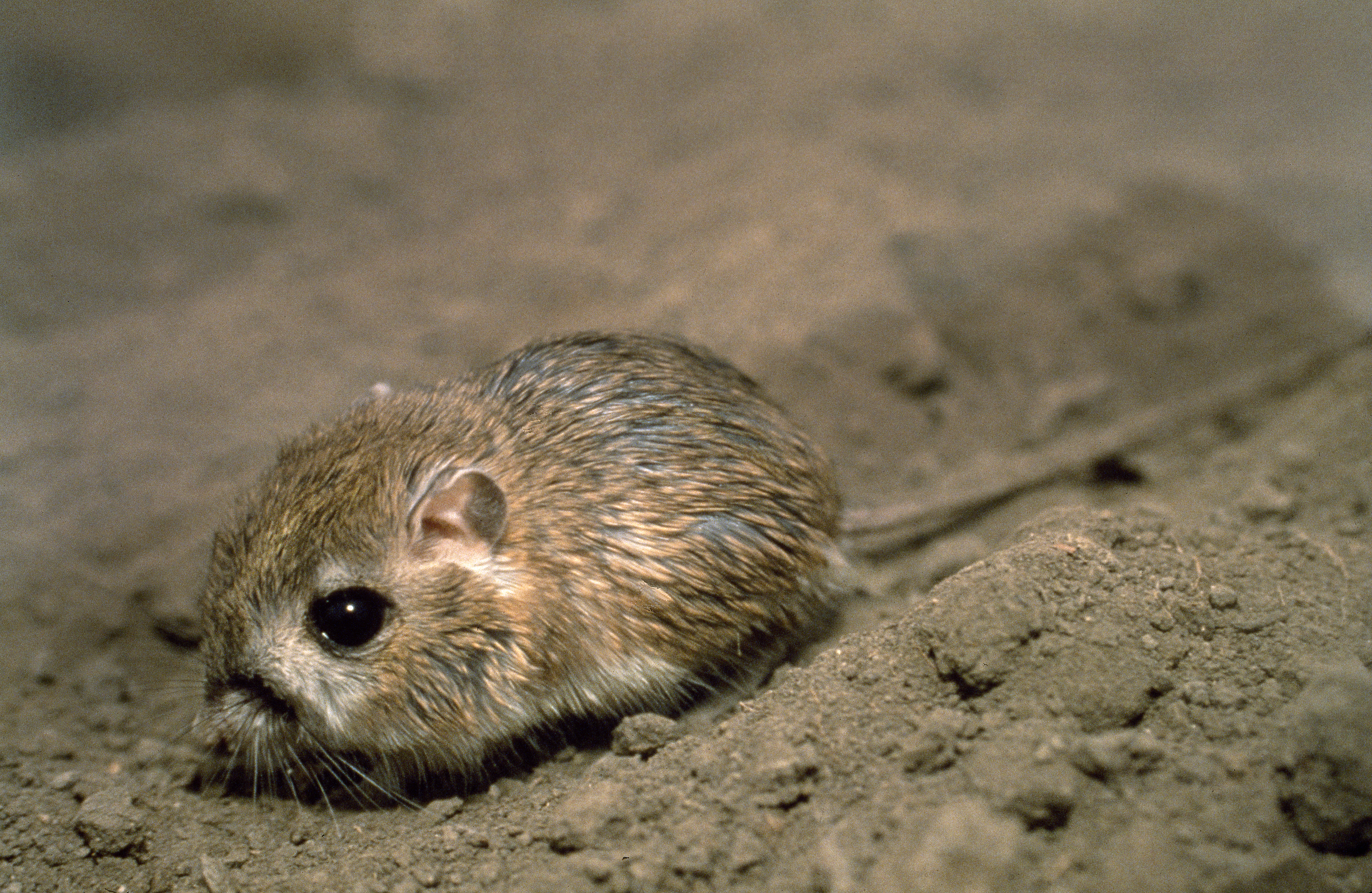
Tipton kangaroo rat (D. nitratoides nitratoides) at the California Living Museum in Bakersfield

Kangaroo rats inhabit overlapping home ranges. These home ranges tend to be small with most activities within 200–300 ft and rarely 600 ft. Home range size can vary within species with Merriam's kangaroo rats having larger home ranges than banner-tailed kangaroo rats. Recently weaned kangaroo rats move into new areas not occupied by adults. Within its home range, a kangaroo rat has a defended territory consisting of its burrowing system.

=== Burrow system ===
Kangaroo rats live in complex burrow systems. The burrows have separate chambers used for specific purposes like sleeping, living, and food storage. The spacing of the burrows depends on the number of kangaroo rats and the abundance of food. Kangaroo rats also live in colonies that range from six to several hundred dens. The burrow of a kangaroo rat is important in providing protection from the harsh desert environment. To maintain a constant temperature and relative humidity in their burrows, kangaroo rats plug the entrances with soil during the day. When the outside temperature is too hot, a kangaroo rat stays in its cool, humid burrow and leaves it only at night. To reduce loss of moisture through respiration when sleeping, a kangaroo rat buries its nose in its fur to accumulate a small pocket of moist air. The burrows of Merriam's kangaroo rats are simpler and shallower than those of banner-tailed kangaroo rats. Banner-tailed kangaroo rats also mate in their burrows, unlike Merriam's kangaroo rats.

=== Social interactions ===
Kangaroo rats are generally solitary animals with little social organization. Kangaroo rats communicate during competitive interactions and courtship. They do cluster together in some feeding situations. Groups of kangaroo rats that exist are aggregations and colonies. There appears to be a dominance hierarchy among male kangaroo rats in competition for access to females. Male kangaroo rats are generally more aggressive than females and are more dominant over them. Females are more tolerant of each other than males are and have more non-aggressive interactions. This is likely in part because the home ranges of females overlap less than the home ranges of males. Linear dominance hierarchies appear to exist among males but it is not known if this is the case for females. Winners of aggressive encounters appear to be the most active individuals.

=== Mating and reproduction ===
Kangaroo rats have a promiscuous mating system. Their reproductive output is highest in summer following high rainfalls. During droughts and food shortages, only a few females will breed. It appears that kangaroo rats can assess their local conditions and adjust their reproductive efforts accordingly. Merriam's kangaroo rats breed between December and May and produce two or three litters per year. Before mating, the male and female will perform nasal-anal circling until the female stops and allows the male to mount her. A Merriam's kangaroo rat female will allow multiple males to mount her in a short time, perhaps to ensure greater chances of producing offspring. Mating in banner-tailed kangaroo rats involves more chasing and foot drumming in the male before the female allows him to mate. Banner-tailed kangaroo rats mate on mounds and the more successful males chase away rival males. The gestation period of kangaroo rats lasts 22–27 days.

The young are born in a fur-lined nest in the burrows. They are born blind and hairless. For the first week, young Merriam kangaroo rats crawl, developing their hind legs in their second or third week. At this time, the young become independent. Banner-tailed kangaroo rats are weaned between 22 and 25 days. Offspring remain in the mound for one or six more months in the maternal caches.

== Taxonomy ==
- Family Heteromyidae
  - Subfamily Dipodomyinae
    - Dipodomys agilis (Agile kangaroo rat)
    - Dipodomys californicus (California kangaroo rat)
    - Dipodomys compactus (Gulf Coast kangaroo rat)
    - Dipodomys deserti (Desert kangaroo rat)
    - Dipodomys elator (Texas kangaroo rat)
    - Dipodomys gravipes (San Quintin kangaroo rat)
    - Dipodomys heermanni (Heermann's kangaroo rat)
      - Dipodomys heermanni berkeleyensis (Berkeley kangaroo rat)
    - Dipodomys ingens (Giant kangaroo rat)
    - Dipodomys merriami (Merriam's kangaroo rat)
    - Dipodomys microps (Chisel-toothed kangaroo rat)
    - Dipodomys nelsoni (Nelson's kangaroo rat)
    - Dipodomys nitratoides (Fresno kangaroo rat)
    - Dipodomys ordii (Ord's kangaroo rat)
    - Dipodomys panamintinus (Panamint kangaroo rat)
    - Dipodomys phillipsii (Phillips's kangaroo rat)
    - Dipodomys simulans (Dulzura kangaroo rat)
    - Dipodomys spectabilis (Banner-tailed kangaroo rat)
    - Dipodomys stephensi (Stephens's kangaroo rat)
    - Dipodomys venustus (Narrow-faced kangaroo rat)
      - Dipodomys venustus venustus (Santa Cruz kangaroo rat)
      - Dipodomys venustus elephantinus (Elephant-eared or big-eared kangaroo rat)
      - Dipodomys venustus sanctiluciae (Santa Lucia kangaroo rat)

== See also ==
- Hopping mouse – a similar murid rodent native to Australia; an example of parallel evolution
- Jerboa – a similar dipodid rodent native to northern Africa and Asia
- Jumping mouse – a non-desert-dwelling dipodid rodent native to China and North America
- Kangaroo mouse – a closely related heteromyid rodent of North America
- Kultarr – an unrelated marsupial with a similar body plan and coloration; an example of convergence
- Springhare – a similar pedetid rodent native to southern and eastern Africa
