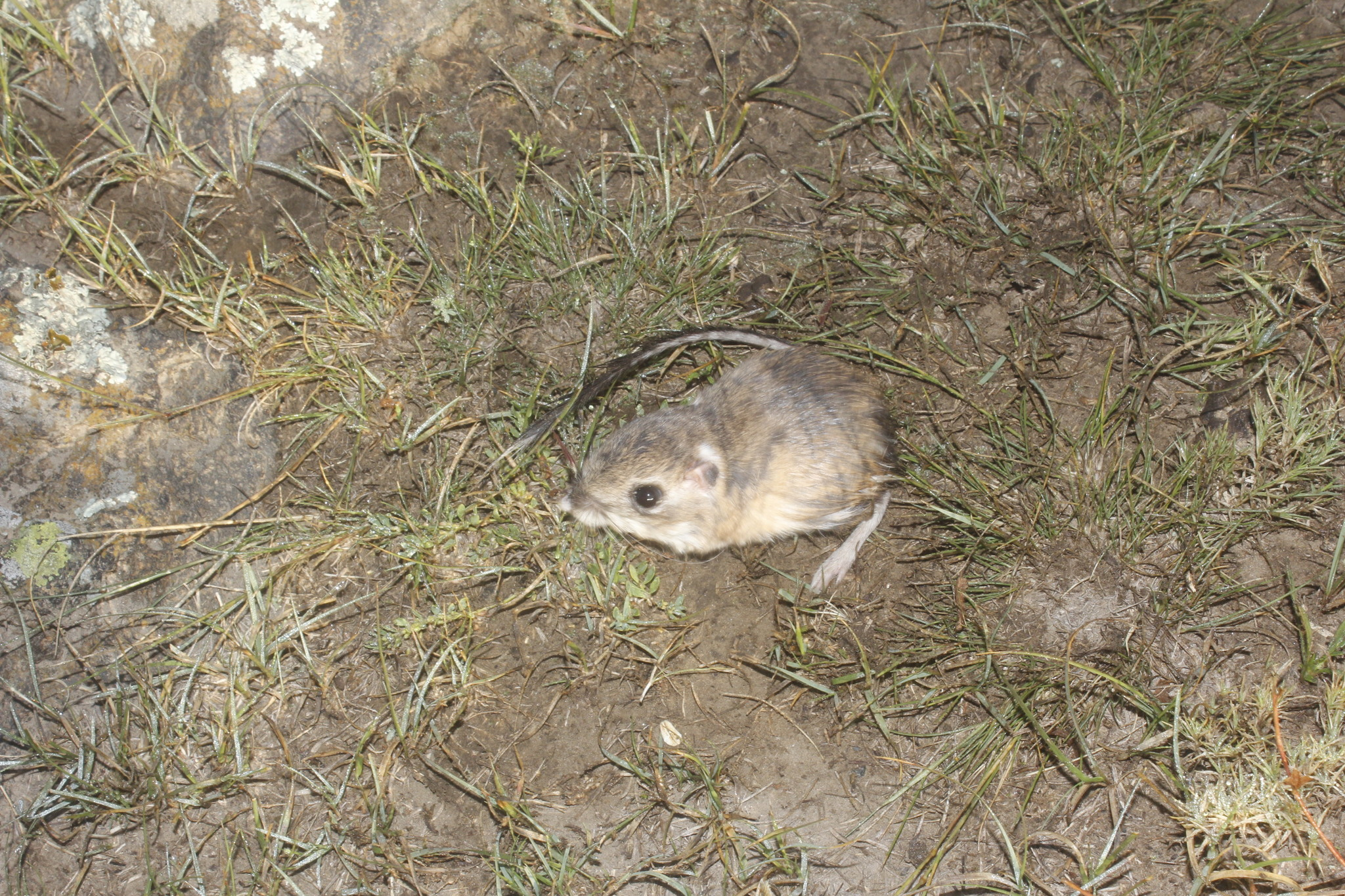

Conservation status
- Least Concern (IUCN 3.1)

Scientific classification
- Kingdom: Animalia
- Phylum: Chordata
- Class: Mammalia
- Order: Rodentia
- Family: Heteromyidae
- Genus: Dipodomys
- Species: D. phillipsii

Binomial name
- Dipodomys phillipsii J. E. Gray, 1841

= Phillips's kangaroo rat =

Species of rodent

Phillips's kangaroo rat (Dipodomys phillipsii) is a species of rodent in the family Heteromyidae. It is endemic to Mexico. Its natural habitat is hot deserts.

The species is named after John Phillips, an official of a Mexican mining company who sent zoological specimens, including the type specimen of this kangaroo rat, to the British Museum.

== Description ==
Phillips's kangaroo rat is a moderate-sized rodent with a small body and a long, banner-like tail. The incisors are smaller and less prominent than those of other kangaroo rats. There are four toes on the hind feet. The pelage varies from ochre, through cinnamon to brownish/black. There are blackish markings on the face and the tail has dark lateral stripes which join near the white tip. The sexes are similar in appearance, but there is considerable variation in size and colouring over the animal's range. Individuals from southern populations are smaller and paler, and have a total length of about 26 centimetres (10 in) including a tail of 16.5 centimetres (6.5 in). Northern individuals are medium to large, pale-coloured and have a fairly broad skull. Individuals from the central part of the range are medium or large and darker in colour.

== Distribution and habitat ==
Phillips's kangaroo rat is endemic to Mexico. Its range extends from the central part of the State of Durango southwards to the northern part of the State of Oaxaca. At one time, it was present in the Valley of Mexico, but has since died out there. Its altitudinal range is from 950 to 2,850 metres (3,120 to 9,350 ft). The species' typical habitat is arid or semi-arid land with bare ground, short grass, weeds, patches of low thornbrush, prickly pear and other species of cactus.

== Ecology ==
Phillips's kangaroo rat is nocturnal and lives in a burrow by day. Some burrows have a single entrance about 7.5 cm (3 in) in diameter, entering the ground at a slight angle, while others have several entrances a metre or so apart. The tunnels consist of curved cylindrical tubes about 5 cm (2 in) in diameter and a terminal chamber. Phillips' kangaroo rat forages on calm nights, even in frosty weather, but do not venture out during severe storms. It appears these kangaroo rats sometimes share their burrows with the silky pocket mouse (Perognathus flavus).

Little is known of the breeding habits of this kangaroo rat, but females containing two or three embryos were found in June and October, and, when attempts were made to trap the animal, juveniles were caught in seven months of the year. The feeding habits are also obscure, but seeds and small green leaves have been found in the animal's cheek pouches, and dandelion leaves have been found in one burrow.

== Status ==
Phillips's kangaroo rat is common within its extensive range; the population is presumed to be large and seems to be stable. For these reasons, the IUCN lists the species as being of "least concern".

== Taxonomic history ==
In John Edward Gray's 1841 species description, he named the species Dipodomys phillipii. This has been considered to be a typographical error considering Gray referred to the species as D. phillipsii in a paper the following year. Other authors used various spelling; Elliott Coues used the spelling D. phillipsi.
