= California kangaroo rat =

Conservation status
- Least Concern (IUCN 3.1)

Scientific classification
- Kingdom: Animalia
- Phylum: Chordata
- Class: Mammalia
- Order: Rodentia
- Family: Heteromyidae
- Genus: Dipodomys
- Species: D. californicus

Binomial name
- Dipodomys californicus Merriam, 1890

Species of rodent

The California kangaroo rat (Dipodomys californicus) is a species of rodent in the family Heteromyidae. California kangaroo rats are especially vulnerable to localized population die outs due to changes in environmental conditions

== Description ==
(Probable) California Kangaroo Rat, Crystal Cove, CA

=== Size ===
The California kangaroo rat is, on average, 312 mm long, with its tail vertebrae comprising 195mm of that total length. Based on its length, experts conclude the weight of the species to be around 75 grams, making its size fairly normal amongst other kangaroo rats in California. The species generally tends to be larger in the northern areas of its distribution (near Modoc County), whereas the smaller animals are often found further south, near the SF Bay Area and Marin County.

Kangaroo rats are not sexually dimorphic, and also have very little difference in cranial shape across species, mainly differing in size alone. Kangaroo rats' morphology differs the most across species in their auditory bulla, with its inflation being a notable way to differentiate between species.

=== Coloration ===
Dipodomys californicus has an almost all-white underside, including its feet, belly, and forelegs; they also have a dash of black near the ankle. The upper surface of the body tends to be a dark cinnamon-tan shade, extending everywhere but the face, which features darker facial markings. During the molting season for the kangaroo rat (around July through November), the active shedding of the previous year's fur will result in a lighter-textured coat growing anew; the colors remain consistent, however, and the animals' colors generally don't fade or change throughout their lives.

=== Behavior ===
It is a nocturnal animal that forages mainly after dark. They also have a peak breeding season between February and April although their entire breeding season stretches from February to September. Is a granivore and herbivore, mainly eating seeds or small vegetation, and fruits when available. Kangaroo rats also do not hibernate, and are less active in rainy conditions, which are believed to be the primary cause of population loss.

== Distribution ==
The California kangaroo rat is endemic to western North America, found in Northern California and southern Oregon. Its distribution is from the Sierra Nevada foothills to Suisun Bay, and northwards in the California Coast Ranges to the foothills of the Cascade Mountains. However, as of 2020, the California kangaroo rat has been found in north Nevada, 1627–1900 meters in elevation. Not only does this make suggest the most easterly sighting of the species, but it also marks the highest altitude that the species has ever been found. California's Kangaroo Mountain was likely named after the California kangaroo rat.

It is an IUCN listed Least Concern species, due to the rather large home area and vast range of its distribution. The populations also thrive due to the fact that the kangaroo rat is adapted to thrive in hostile climates, where very few humans (in general) have encroached or developed infrastructure. In the cases of populations where the kangaroo rats do live within or near to human settlements, their ecological niche seems to be far less offensive and intrusive towards people than house mice or common rats, making their survival even more likely; kangaroo rats do not scavenge off of trash, human food or waste and do not nest in human habitations. Likewise they do not carry the same pathogens as common mice or rats, further ensuring a steady population.

=== Habitat ===
The California kangaroo rat mainly lives in woodland, chaparral, or grassland environments. NatureServe notes they mostly live in “Well-drained soils of valley grasslands, open chaparral, and open foothill woodland”. It burrows underground under shrubs, rocks, or in ground squirrel burrows when it is not active. Uses paths forged by other animals, or roads/trails when close to human presence.

== Taxonomy ==
Dipodomys californicus was formerly included as a subspecies of Dipodomys heermanni, but differs enough in chromosomal and biochemical characteristics to warrant being recognized as a distinct species. One such distinction between Dipodomys californicus and other four toed species of Dipodmys heermanni is their unique tail coloration which features a white tip with black stripes on the top and bottom.
