= Chisel-toothed kangaroo rat =

Conservation status
- Least Concern (IUCN 3.1)

Scientific classification
- Kingdom: Animalia
- Phylum: Chordata
- Class: Mammalia
- Order: Rodentia
- Family: Heteromyidae
- Genus: Dipodomys
- Species: D. microps

Binomial name
- Dipodomys microps (Merriam, 1904)

Species of rodent

The chisel-toothed kangaroo rat (Dipodomys microps) is a species of rodent in the family Heteromyidae.

There are 13 sub-species. Saltbush leaves are a major dietary component, requiring specialized physiology to eliminate the salt while retaining water.

A chisel-toothed kangaroo rat in Mt. Charleston, Nevada.

== Description ==
They range between 268.4–273 mm (10.57–10.75 in) long with their body length from 100–116 mm (3.9–4.6 in) and tails being longer than their body ranges between 136–190 mm (5.4–7.5 in). Their hind feet are approximately 40% the length of their body and ranges between 40–45 mm (1.6–1.8 in) and the front limbs being much shorter. Males tend to be a bit larger than the females. Their backs can range from a sandy brown, gray-brown to a pale yellow, their bellies are white, and their sides range from yellow to yellow gray. They have "tufted" tails which are brown with white stripes on the sided and the tuft at the end of the tail being dark brown with scattered white hairs. They have large rounded bicolour ears. Their incisors are unique and are used to identify them, they are anteriorly flattened and broad, like chisels, which is where their name comes from.

== Geographic range and habitat ==
It is endemic to the United States (found in Nevada, Utah, California, Oregon, and parts of Arizona and Idaho). They inhabit the arid regions with gravelly soils are found at moderate elevations (1,000–1,500 m (3,280–4,920 ft)), though they have been found at elevations of 3,200 m (10,500 ft) above sea level. Their habit is saltbrush, especially Atriplex confertifolia, dominated desert valleys and upland deserts with blackbush and are less common in sand dunes. They create burrows in the ground with multiple entries, usually under the bushes of shrubs. Their usual habitat is desert shrub.

== Diet ==
D. microps is a facultative specialist, and the only foliovore in the Dipodomys genus. 60 - 80% of its diet consists of Atriplex confertifolia leaves. They do consume some seed and insects, however, this is a small portion of their diet. This desert shrub, Atriplex confertifolia, is adapted to desert life by encrusting its leaf surfaces with a layer of salt crystals, this has a dual purpose, one of which is to reflect incoming solar radiation which help maintain its water homeostasis, and secondly it is a defense against herbivory. D. microps have adapted morphologically, physiologically, and behaviorally to overcome this defense mechanism. They have evolved their lower incisors to become flat, broad, and chisel-shaped, which is a unique to character among the kangaroo rats.

They collect the leaves of the Atriplex shrub and stuff it into their cheek pouch and take it back to their burrows. They have been found to have caches of leaves of up 250g. Their unique incisors are used to scrape/strip the epidermis and the salt layer off of the leaf by repeatedly pulling the leaf downward and perpendicular to its lower incisors. This is then repeated on the other side till the inner tissue, consisting of the parenchyma, vascular tissue, bundle sheath, and the mesophyl, which is then consumed. This part of the leaf has a water content of up to 80% in the spring, and D. microps obtains its water from the leaves. Another adaptation to assist with the consumption is that the upper lip closes off the mouth cavity which reduces the amount of salt entering or falling into the mouth.
