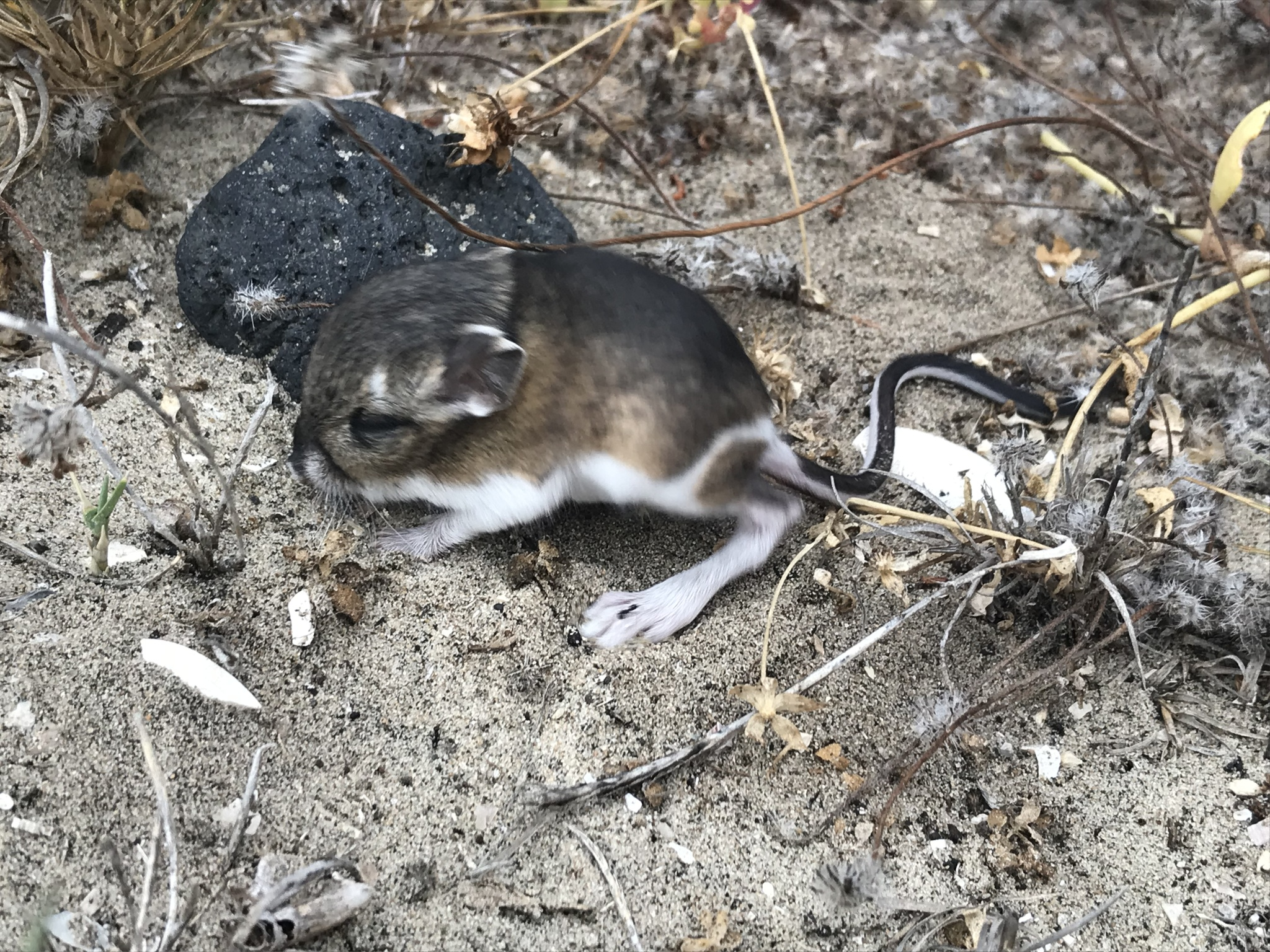

Conservation status
- Least Concern (IUCN 3.1)

Scientific classification
- Kingdom: Animalia
- Phylum: Chordata
- Class: Mammalia
- Order: Rodentia
- Family: Heteromyidae
- Genus: Dipodomys
- Species: D. simulans

Binomial name
- Dipodomys simulans (Merriam, 1904)

= Dulzura kangaroo rat =

Dipodomys simulans

Species of rodent

The Dulzura kangaroo rat, or San Diego kangaroo rat (Dipodomys simulans) is a species of rodent in the family Heteromyidae. It is found in Baja California, Mexico, and in the Colorado Desert and elsewhere in California in the United States. It is a common species and the IUCN has assessed its status as being of "least concern".

== Taxonomy ==
The Dulzura kangaroo rat was at one time thought to be conspecific with the agile kangaroo rat (Dipodomys agilis) but the two are now recognised as being separate species; there is significant differences between them in their morphology, and their chromosome counts differ, with D. agilis having a karyotype of 2n=62 and D. simulans having 2n=60.

=== Subspecies ===
The Dulzura kangaroo rat was classified one of several subspecies of agile kangaroo rat following Joseph Grinnell's 1922 classification. Several other proposed subspecies of agile kangaroo rat have been placed in the synonymy of the Dulzura kangaroo rat's nominate subspecies. The authors of Mammal Species of the World recognise two subspecies of the Dulzura kangaroo rat.

- D. s. simulans (Merriam, 1904) includes the synonyms australis, antiquarius, cabezonae, eremoecus, latimaxilaris, martirensis, paralius, pedionomus, and plectilis
- D. s. peninsularis (Merriam, 1907)

== Description ==
This is a medium-sized kangaroo rat with a length of 265 to 319 mm (10.4 to 12.6 in) including a tail of 155 to 203 mm (6.1 to 8.0 in). The upper parts are dark brown and the underparts white. There are five toes on the hind feet which are 43 to 46 mm (1.7 to 1.8 in) long (some related species have four toes). The tail is well-haired and has a dark streak along its under surface. Like other kangaroo rats, this species proceeds in a series of hops, using only its hind legs, and stabilising itself with its long tail. The front legs are used for digging.

== Distribution and habitat ==
The species is native to southern California and northwestern Mexico, being present in much of Baja California. Its typical habitat is sandy and gravelly soils in semi-desert, dry grassland and scrub, and chaparral near the coast; it is also sometimes found in forests of pine, oak and fir.

== Ecology ==
The Dulzura kangaroo rat lives in a burrow which has several entrances, some of which may be at the base of shrubs. It is nocturnal, spending the day in its burrow (often blocking up the entrances) and emerging for a few hours at night. It feeds mainly on seeds, but also eats green plant material and insects, its diet varying with what is available at the time of year. It carries its food back to the burrow in its cheek pouches. It is solitary, the female defending a territory against intruders. Breeding can take place at any time of year but is more common in winter or spring. There is a single litter in the year, usually consisting of two to four offspring.

== Status ==
D. simulans is described as common in the United States, with densities of up to 45 animals per hectare being reported. It is less abundant in Mexico but altogether the population is thought to be stable. No particular threats have been identified, and the International Union for Conservation of Nature has assessed this kangaroo rat's conservation status as being of "least concern".
