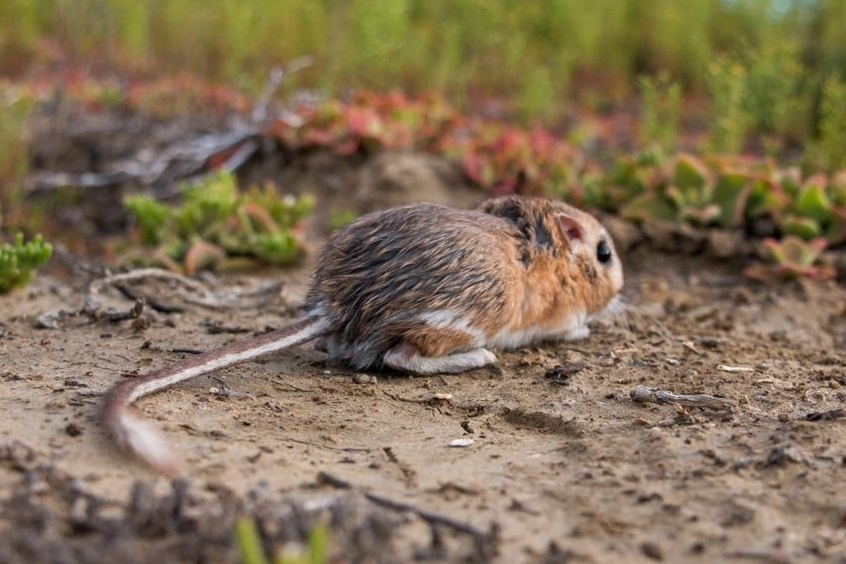

Conservation status
- Critically Endangered (IUCN 3.1)

Scientific classification
- Kingdom: Animalia
- Phylum: Chordata
- Class: Mammalia
- Order: Rodentia
- Family: Heteromyidae
- Genus: Dipodomys
- Species: D. gravipes

Binomial name
- Dipodomys gravipes Huey, 1925

= San Quintin kangaroo rat =

Species of rodent

The San Quintin kangaroo rat (Dipodomys gravipes) is a species of rodent in the family Heteromyidae. It is endemic to Mexico, where it is known only from western Baja California. Its natural habitat includes arid lowlands with sparse vegetation.

The first description of this species was made in 1925 by Laurence M. Huey (1892–1963), an American zoologist. At that time, two large colonies of this kangaroo rat were known, but since then, the area they occupied has been converted to farmland. Until 2017, no specimens had been found since 1986 and the IUCN listed the species as "critically endangered" and possibly extinct. However, in 2017, the species was rediscovered in the Valle Tranquilo Nature Preserve by researchers from the San Diego Natural History Museum; these findings were detailed in a report published in 2018.

== Description ==
The San Quintin kangaroo rat is a small species of kangaroo rat with a head-and-body length of about 13 cm (5 in) and a weight of 80 to 90 g (2.8 to 3.2 oz). The hairy tail has a large tuft of hairs on the end and is longer than the body. The fur on the head and back is a pale pinkish-buff, with some longer black hairs. The underparts are white and a white spot is above the eye, and white stripes run down either side of the tail. The upper surface of the hind feet is white, while the under surface is black. Like other kangaroo rats, the hind legs are powerful and propel the animal in a series of large bounds. The front legs, however, are small and are used for manipulating food and cleaning the cheek pouches. The tail provides balance while jumping and is used as a prop when stationary.

== Distribution and habitat ==
The San Quintin kangaroo rat has a limited range in the state of Baja California, Mexico. It occupies a 20 km (12 mi) wide strip of coastal land from San Telmo to El Rosario with two separate populations. Individuals in the southern population are on average larger than those in the northern group. The northern population occupies cactus-covered slopes and adjacent areas with short vegetation, while the southern population is found in floodplains and flat places with sparse vegetation among low hills. The flatter parts of its range are increasingly being cultivated for the production of food for human consumption. The species is now only known from the Valle Tranquilo Nature Reserve, just south of San Quintin.

== Ecology ==
The San Quintin kangaroo rat lives in a burrow with several entrances, none of which is usually concealed under shrubs. The burrow can be 50 cm (20 in) deep with a main passage and several side passages, and has about three nesting chambers and ten food storage chambers. The diet of this kangaroo rat is probably seeds and green shoots. This animal is nocturnal, and young have been seen at several different times of year, but mainly in the winter and spring.

== Status ==
When this species was first described by American zoologist Laurence M. Huey in 1925, two large colonies of these kangaroo rats were known. Since then, virtually the whole area which they inhabited has been converted into agricultural land. The colonies have disappeared, and intensive searches in the 1990s failed to detect any specimens. The International Union for Conservation of Nature has assessed their conservation status as "critically endangered" and notes that the species may be extinct. The rediscovery of the species in 2017 has led to a proposed conservation plan for the area by the local organization Terra Peninsular A.C. and University of California Institute for Mexico and the United States.
