= Big-eared kangaroo rat =

Scientific classification
- Kingdom: Animalia
- Phylum: Chordata
- Class: Mammalia
- Infraclass: Placentalia
- Order: Rodentia
- Family: Heteromyidae
- Genus: Dipodomys
- Species: D. elephantinus

Binomial name
- Dipodomys elephantinus Grinnell, 1919

Species of rodent

The big-eared or elephant-eared kangaroo rat (Dipodomys elephantinus) is a kangaroo rat that lives in chaparral. It is named for and distinguished by its comparatively large ears. It is now considered a subspecies of the narrow-faced kangaroo rat, It is endemic to California in the Gabilan Range region of San Benito and Monterey counties.
