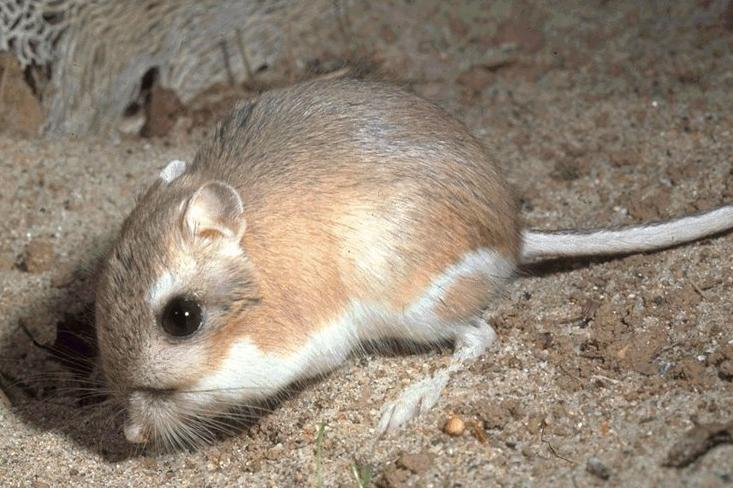

Conservation status
- Least Concern (IUCN 3.1)

Scientific classification
- Kingdom: Animalia
- Phylum: Chordata
- Class: Mammalia
- Order: Rodentia
- Family: Heteromyidae
- Genus: Dipodomys
- Species: D. ordii

Binomial name
- Dipodomys ordii Woodhouse, 1853

= Ord's kangaroo rat =

Species of rodent

Ord's kangaroo rat (Dipodomys ordii) is a kangaroo rat native to western North America, specifically the Great Plains and the Great Basin, with its range extending from extreme southern Canada to central Mexico.

Ord's kangaroo rat has a fifth toe on its hind feet, which distinguishes it from Dipodomys elator. It is bicolored with gold-brown dorsal hair and a white stomach. It has a long tail with a bushy tip, and is dark dorsally and ventrally with a white lateral stripe. Its hind feet are modified for jumping, and exceed 35 mm in length, and its total length exceeds 240 mm. Its tail is usually less than 160 mm, distinguishing it from D. elator (which exceeds 160 mm).

Though a common species in the United States, the population in Canada is considered endangered.

== Taxonomy ==
The currently accepted scientific name for Ord's kangaroo rat is Dipodomys ordii Woodhouse. It belongs to the family Heteromyidae, kangaroo rats and mice. Hall listed 35 subspecies, but Kennedy and Schnell reported many of these subspecies are probably not legitimate since they were based on the assumption of little sexual dimorphism in the species. It has now been established that sexual dimorphism within the taxon is considerable.

== Distribution ==
Ord's kangaroo rat ranges from southern Alberta and southern Saskatchewan to southern Hidalgo, Mexico, and from central Oregon and eastern California east to central Kansas and Oklahoma.

Ord's kangaroo rats occur mainly in semiarid, open habitats. In Nevada, they were trapped in desert scrub and gravelly soil, flat pebble desert, and washes. In Utah, Ord's kangaroo rats have an affinity for open shrublands and grasslands on sandy soils. In southeastern Idaho, big sagebrush/crested wheatgrass (Agropyron cristatum) range, most Ord's kangaroo rat captures occurred on disturbed sites or areas of sparse cover: Russian thistle (Salsola kali), cheatgrass (Bromus tectorum), and green rabbitbrush (Chrysothamnus viscidiflorus), followed by disturbed areas seeded to crested wheatgrass, then undisturbed big sagebrush. In western South Dakota, Ord's kangaroo rats are associated with black-tailed prairie dog (Cynomys ludovicianus) towns. In Wyoming, Ord's kangaroo rats are abundant in sand dune communities where vegetation is greater than 10 inches (25 cm) tall and bare soil exceeds 40%. In Colorado, Ord's kangaroo rats were primarily captured in open areas with firm soil. Firm or lightly compacted soils are needed for burrow construction; highly compacted soils are too hard for them to dig. In areas of desert pavement or tough clay soils in the Trans-Pecos region of Texas, Ord's kangaroo rats are confined to pockets of windblown sand and alluvial soils along arroyos.

Strong intraspecific competition and little interspecific competition occurs among Dipodomys species. In New Mexico, where Ord's kangaroo rats are sympatric with Merriam's kangaroo rats (D. merriamii), Ord's kangaroo rats were mostly captured in grassy microhabitats, and Merriam's kangaroo rats were captured more often around creosotebush. Herbicide defoliation of shrubs (for rangeland improvement) reduced live canopy cover of creosotebush and resulted in an increase in bush muhly (Muhlenbergia porteri). After treatment, Ord's kangaroo rats replaced Merriam's kangaroo rats as the dominant rodent. This was suggested to be due to the change in habitat structure to open grass.

Removal experiments to establish single species populations of kangaroo rats were unsuccessful, since many kangaroo rats are transient and quickly occupy vacated habitats. Only one adult occupies a given burrow system, except for a brief period during breeding activity. Little territoriality occurs above ground except near burrow entrances, which are defended.

In New Mexico, Ord's kangaroo rat annual home ranges in mesquite averaged 3.35 acres (1.36 hectares). In Nevada sagebrush/grassland, Ord's kangaroo rat home ranges were estimated as 1.53 acres (0.62 hectares) by the circular method and 1.06 acres (0.43 hectares) by the principal component method. Home range movements increased through spring and again in late fall and early winter. No significant difference was found between male and female Ord's kangaroo rat home ranges; however, female home ranges decreased during reproductive periods. Recapture data for Ord's kangaroo rats in Arizona indicated they do not travel far from the home range; most Ord's kangaroo rats were recaptured within 165 ft (50 m) of the original capture site. Data on the lifetime movements of individuals indicated most were recaptured within 330 feet (100 m) of the original capture site.

In sagebrush in the Great Basin, Ord's kangaroo rats reach an average density of 113 rats per 10 ha. In intermountain salt-desert shrublands, the population density averaged 28 individuals per 10 ha in shadscale communities and 135 individuals per 10 ha in black greasewood (Sarcobatus vermiculatus) communities.

== Plant communities ==
Ord's kangaroo rats occur in communities on sandy soils, including semiarid grasslands, mixed-grass prairie, shrub- and scrublands, and pinyon (Pinus spp.)-juniper (Juniperus spp.) woodlands. In Canada, They are confined to open, sandy areas with sparse covers of sagebrush (Artemisia spp.), snowberry (Symphoricarpos spp.), rose (Rosa spp.), creeping juniper (J. horizontalis) and buffaloberry (Shepherdia spp.); the distribution of Ord's kangaroo rats appears to be closely associated with that of lanceleaved breadroot (Psoralea lanceolata). In Oregon, Ord's kangaroo rats occur in big sagebrush (A. tridentata), western juniper (J. occidentalis), and greasewood (Sarcobatus spp.) communities. In Idaho, they are most abundant in juniper woodlands with rabbitbrush (Chrysothamnus spp.) and winterfat (Krascheninnikovia lanata) in the understory, but also occur on shadscale (Atriplex confertifolia) range. In Utah, Ord's kangaroo rats have an affinity for sagebrush, pinyon-juniper, and saltbush (Atriplex spp.) communities. In Nevada, Ord's kangaroo rats are associated with big sagebrush communities. In Colorado, Ord's kangaroo rats comprised 19% of small mammal captures in pinyon-juniper forest, scattered pinyon-juniper, and pinyon-juniper in canyon habitats. In New Mexico, Ord's kangaroo rats are found in yucca (Yucca spp.), oak (Quercus spp.), mesquite (Prosopis spp.), saltbush, and creosotebush (Larrea tridentata) communities. They are particularly abundant in mesquite sand dunes. In Texas, Ord's kangaroo rats occur in honey mesquite (P. glandulosa), sand sagebrush (Artemisia filifolia), yucca, sand shinnery oak (Q. havardii), and broom snakeweed (Gutierrezia sarothrae) communities. In southwestern Kansas, Ord's kangaroo rats are characteristic residents of sand sagebrush prairie.

== Cover requirements ==
Even in shrub-dominated communities, heteromyids including Ord's kangaroo rat tend to concentrate their activity in open areas between shrubs.

Ord's kangaroo rats dig shallow burrows in loose sand in the sides of natural sand dunes, riverbanks, or road cuts. The one central burrow is surrounded by trails to feeding areas. The burrows have 3-in-diameter (7.6-cm-dia) openings. Small mounds are usually formed outside the entrance to the burrow. The burrow opening is usually plugged with soil during the day to maintain temperature and humidity within tolerable levels. They scoop out small, shallow depressions to be used as dusting spots.

== Lifecycle ==
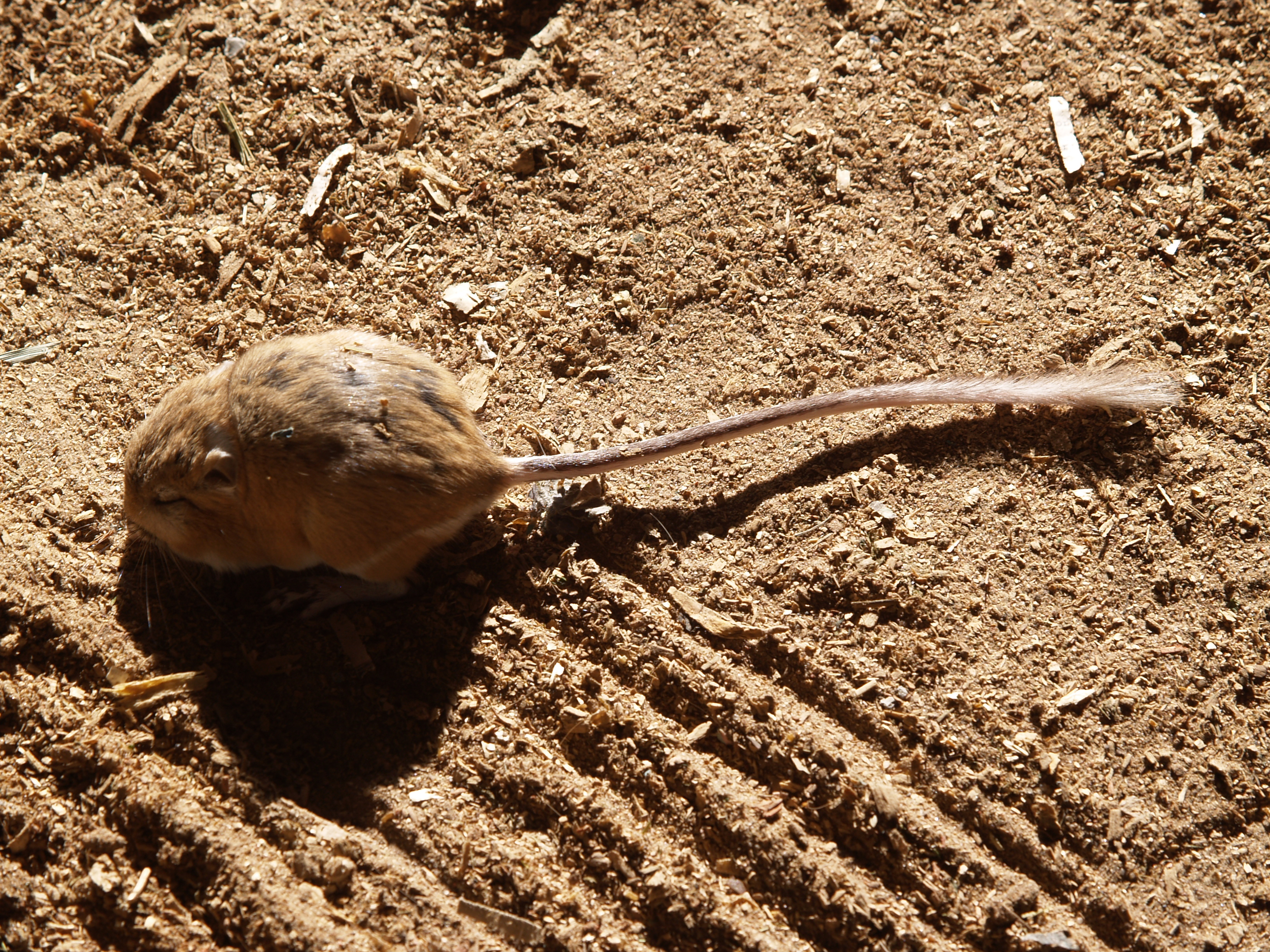
Ord's kangaroo rat

Ord's kangaroo rats are nocturnal, and spend their days in deep burrows. Males are usually more abundant and active than females. Activity increases under cloud cover, particularly in winter. Ord's kangaroo rats are active year-round in Texas, but further north, they are seldom seen above ground in cold weather.

Ord's kangaroo rat breeding season varies with subspecies and area. Usually, one or two peak breeding seasons occur per year, and in many areas, some breeding activity occurs year-round. The size of ovaries is significantly positively correlated with temperature. The average length of the breeding period is 6.8 months. In Texas, males are fertile all year, with peak reproductive activity occurring between August and March. Higher reproductive rates are associated with increased precipitation and food supply and decreased population density. In a favorable growing season, most females breed at least twice a year, but when population density increased, females did not breed until November though growing conditions and food supplies were favorable. In Arizona, the lowest proportion of males in breeding condition (about 60% of the male population) occurred in January and September–October. The lowest number of females in breeding condition occurred in November, but at least a few females were breeding at that time. In Oklahoma, the two peaks in breeding activity are August–September and December through March. In many areas, the onset of breeding activity follows a period of rainfall the previous month.

Gestation lasts 28 to 32 days; one to six embryos are usually found. In captivity, the maximum litter size was six young. The maximum number of litters produced per year by a captive female was five, the maximum number of litters per lifetime was 9, and the maximum number of young per female's lifetime was 38. The longest-lived Ord's kangaroo rat in captivity is a wild caught female who lived until 9 yr 1 months. Brown and Zeng calculated an annual death rate of 0.35 for all age classes.

== Food habits ==
Ord's kangaroo rats are primarily granivorous and herbivorous. They consume a variety of foods, but most commonly eat the seeds of grasses and forbs, green vegetation, and dry vegetation. They occasionally consume animal material, mostly arthropods. In Colorado, seeds comprised 74% of their diets, forbs 13%, grasses and sedges 5%, arthropods 4%, and fungi and mosses 2%.

In southeastern Idaho big sagebrush/crested wheatgrass range, Ord's kangaroo rats consumed (in order of proportion) pollen, arthropods, plant parts (Asteraceae) and crested wheatgrass seeds. A study of Ord's kangaroo rat foods in Texas found the primary foods consumed included seeds of sand paspalum (Paspalum stramineum), honey mesquite, sand bluestem (Andropogon gerardi var. paucipilus), common ragweed (Ambrosia artemisiifolia), and rose-ring gaillardia (Gaillardia pulchella). In Texas, seeds of creosotebush, gramas (Bouteloua spp.) and dropseeds (Sporobolus spp.) formed the major portion of Ord's kangaroo rat diets. Seeds of mesquite, Russian-thistle, sunflowers (Helianthus spp.), and sandbur (Cenchrus spp.) are also major dietary items.

Harvested seeds are transported in cheek pouches to burrows and consumed or cached there. Ord's kangaroo rats also cache seed in scattered shallow holes; this activity sometimes results in seedling emergence. They are easily able to retrieve shallowly buried seeds. A single Ord's kangaroo rat may make tens to hundreds of caches, each with tens to hundreds of seeds.

Kangaroo rats are physiologically adapted to arid environments. Most water is obtained from seeds and succulent plants. They drink water when it is available, but apparently do not require free water.

== Predators ==
In the Great Basin sagebrush, intermountain sagebrush steppe, and intermountain salt desert shrublands, potential predators of Ord's kangaroo rats include coyotes (Canis latrans), kit fox (Vulpes velox), bobcats (Lynx rufus), badgers (Taxidea taxus), long-eared owls (Asio otus), short-eared owls (Asio flammeus), great horned owls (Bubo virginianus), burrowing owls (Athene cunicularia), hawks (Buteonidae and Falconidae), rattlesnakes (Crotalus spp.), and gopher snakes (Pituophis melanoleucus). In Idaho, the remains of Ord's kangaroo rats were found in up to 25% of prairie falcon (Falco mexicanus) nests. The three-year average frequency of Ord's kangaroo rat remains in prairie falcon nests was 4%.
