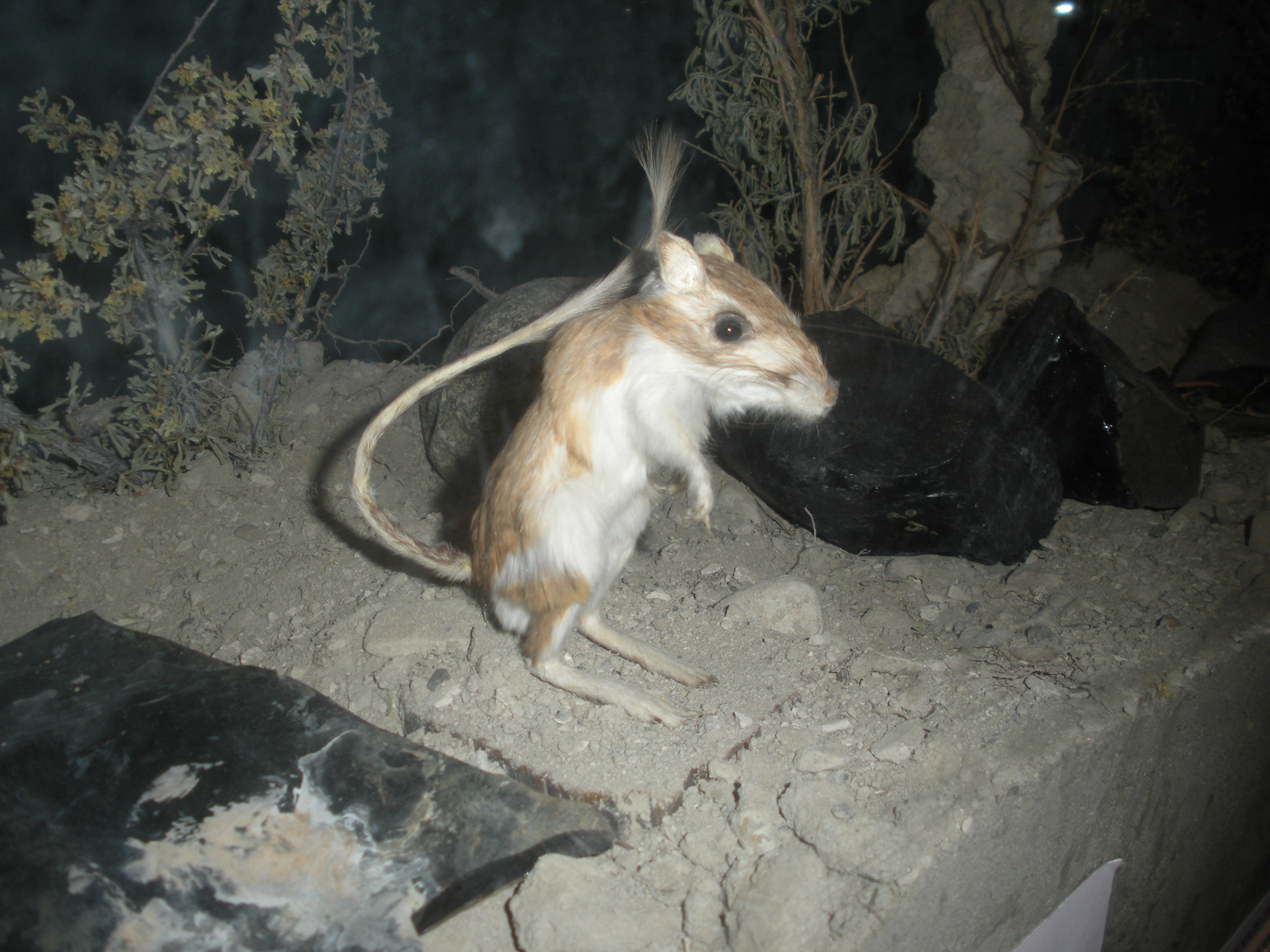
- A taxidermied Panamint kangaroo rat at a visitor center

Conservation status
- Least Concern (IUCN 3.1)

Scientific classification
- Kingdom: Animalia
- Phylum: Chordata
- Class: Mammalia
- Order: Rodentia
- Family: Heteromyidae
- Genus: Dipodomys
- Species: D. panamintinus

Binomial name
- Dipodomys panamintinus (Merriam, 1894)

= Panamint kangaroo rat =

Species of rodent

The Panamint kangaroo rat (Dipodomys panamintinus) is a species of rodent in the family Heteromyidae. It is endemic to the Mojave Desert in eastern California and western Nevada, in the United States.

== Description ==
The Panamint kangaroo rat is considered medium-sized for its genus. It is pale clay-colored with blackish patches around the face. The tail is extremely long, on average 140% of its body length and contains a white stripe with a heavy tuft of hair at the end. The species is named after an area of its range in the Panamint Valley and Panamint Range Mountains just west of Death Valley. Their common name derives from their bipedal form. They morphologically adapted to use bipedal hopping as their primary means of locomotion.

The Panamint kangaroo rat can be distinguished from other species of the genus because the hind feet have five toes which varies in comparison to other members which have four toes on their hind feet. Sexual dimorphism is present where males tend to be larger than females in body size.

A notable characteristic of the Panamint kangaroo rat is the fur lined cheek pouches that it uses to obtain large quantities of food. These pouches keep the food separate from the mouth which aids in preventing moisture loss.

== Ecology ==
=== Range and habitat ===
The Panamint kangaroo rat has a rather restricted distribution in comparison to some species of the genus. It is centered in Great Basin bush desert in western Nevada and east of the Sierra Nevada mountains in California with a long extension southward into the western Mojave Desert. They tend to live at higher elevations between 1,200 and 1,950 meters (3,940 and 6,400 ft).

Panamint kangaroo rats occupy holes in small mounds of sand that have accumulated around clumps of brush. In the Panamint Mountains, one animal may occupy a burrow that has 12 or more tunnels, the mouths of which are connected on the surface by well-defined runways. Home range size varies throughout the year, peaking in February and July.

=== Diet ===
Dipodomys panamintinus is a granivore that lives on metabolic water. Their diet tends to vary with the seasons, but tends to primarily consist of seeds that are high in carbohydrates. It gathers large bunches of seeds and packs them into fur-lined cheek pouches. Some examples of seeds and other food sources which they obtain are pinion pine, juniper berries, green shoots of grass, insects, and mesquite.

They tend to partake in both scatter hoarding (single or small clusters of seeds buried in the ground surface) and larder hoarding (deposition of seeds in burrows and chambers). This hoarding style affects seed dispersal throughout the environment in which they live. They rely heavily on olfactory senses to be able to locate these seed deposits for utilization during times of food scarcity. Based on the physiological aspect of their sense of smell, Panamint kangaroo rats seem to have a better time locating these hoards during dry weather.

== Behavior ==
The Panamint kangaroo rat is nocturnal and does not hibernate. It tends to be active throughout the year except when limited by snow cover. The species is solitary and separate except during estrus.

=== Locomotion ===
The bipedal form of locomotion that the Panamint kangaroo rat utilizes is very specialized. They will move by various means depending on the environmental situation they are in. For example, when undisturbed, a slowly moving animal travels by quadrupedal hopping, bipedal hopping or, bipedal walking and when frightened, the hopping changes into erratic bipedal leaps in order to avoid predators. Panamint kangaroo rats are excellent swimmers, their large hind feet give them considerable agility in the water. The Panamint kangaroo rat's hop is about the same length of its body. The availability of water and nutrition can have an effect on the activity of the animal.

=== Mating and reproduction ===
Responses between males and females change cyclically as a female passes through estrus. Continuous proximity of the male may cause the female to stop cycling so, successful breeding demands that both sexes dwell separately, coming together for mating with only a brief paring interval. Males home ranges will become broader during spring for mating. The height of breeding season is between February and March. Litter size ranges between 3 and 4 young.

== Physiology ==
Because of the dry desert environment that the Panamint kangaroo rat inhabits, it has developed a specialized way to metabolize water from their food that they obtain. These kangaroo rats are able to excrete urine that is extremely concentrated as a means to retain water. When deprived of water, it only produces a small drop of urine every 1–2 hours. Surprisingly these kangaroo rats possess very limited means of temperature regulation, despite living in an environment characterized by wide extremes of temperature. Above 35 °C the Panamint kangaroo rat utilizes their burrows to help maintain homeothermy.
