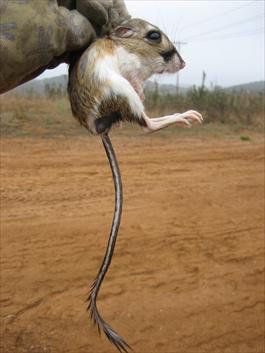

Conservation status
- Vulnerable (IUCN 3.1)

Scientific classification
- Kingdom: Animalia
- Phylum: Chordata
- Class: Mammalia
- Order: Rodentia
- Family: Heteromyidae
- Genus: Dipodomys
- Species: D. stephensi

Binomial name
- Dipodomys stephensi (Merriam, 1907)

= Stephens's kangaroo rat =

Species of rodent

Stephens's kangaroo rat (Dipodomys stephensi) is a species of rodent in the family Heteromyidae. It is endemic to the Southern California region of the United States, primarily in western Riverside County. The species is named after American zoologist Frank Stephens (1849–1937).

The natural habitat of Stephens's kangaroo rat is sparsely vegetated temperate grassland. This habitat has been destroyed or modified for agriculture throughout the species' range; as a result, Stephens's kangaroo rat is listed as a threatened species by the U.S. Fish and Wildlife Service. It occurs sympatrically with the agile kangaroo rat, but tends to prefer few shrubs and gravelly soils to the agile's preference for denser shrubs.

== Description ==
This kangaroo rat is part of the Dipodomys genus. Despite the common name, this is unrelated to an Australian kangaroo (Macropodidae). It is a medium size for its genus at 277 to 300mm in total length and an average weight of 67.26g. Its tail length is 164 to 180mm, which puts the tail about 1.45 times the length of the body. The color is described as being bicolored with tan to dark brown on the dorsal side and white on the ventral side. The soles of the hind limbs have a dusky color to them, there are a few white hairs on the tufts of the tail, and there are ventral and dorsal white stripes that run along the tail.

== Range and habitat ==
Stephens's kangaroo rat was once found in limited regions in southern California, but now due to development leading to habitat loss the populations are now only found in select nature reserves in San Jacinto Valley, San Bernardino, and northwestern San Diego counties in California. Roads surround all the locations that they live or are found to live. This creates problems if they are paved and used often because of car fatalities. However, the Stephens's kangaroo rat has been found to inhabit and colonize dirt roadsides. This may be due to the type of habitat they prefer. The Stephens's kangaroo rat prefers sparsely vegetated areas, about 15% cover, that have annual grasslands with low shrub cover of sagebrush. Further more they like seral stage, intermediate, plant communities that are retained by fires, grazing, and or agriculture. They are also limited to gravely soil that cannot be too dense. This is because they have to burrow into it to make their tunnel systems for nesting and storage.

== Food and foraging behavior ==
With living in sparsely covered habitat and making bare spots in the land the rats create trails. They use these trails to get around easily from food source to food source. These trails lessen some of the dangers of foraging, as they make for a clear path for fast getaways leading straight to their burrow. Even though they move along their cleared trails to go to different food sources and the use to escape terrestrial predators they have to worry about aerial predators. They deal with this by foraging under the remaining shrubs that are left standing for seeds. Seeds are the on the main course for this kangaroo rat, and that means that they are a granivorous. In doing dissection of kangaroo rat stomachs it was found that their diets composed of red brome (Bromus rubens), common Mediterranean grass (Schismus barbatus), and red-stemmed filaree (Erodium cicutarium). All of these species were introduced to North America. Ants, chewing lice, and darkling beetles were also found in their stomachs but not as prominent as the plant species listed above.

== Impacts on their environment ==
Stephens's kangaroo rats have been shown to have a keystone like effect on their sounding environment. One way this is seen is by digging burrows. By digging burrows the soil fertility increases and the water infiltration increase as well. This then leads to larger plant diversity. Seed caching is also another means of how they change their environment. Seed caching is when they bury seeds to hide them so they can come back later for them. They don't always find them again or eat them and this leads to a greater diversity of plants around their burrow. Erodium, which is an invasive species, is able to outcompete native species. This then diminishes the natural diversity within the habitat. Stephens's kangaroo rat is able to help decrease the impact by controlling the impact of the Erodium by keeping the numbers down. These kangaroo rats clear patches of ground, which allows it to keep a seral stage environment. This removal of vegetation also keeps down the number of granivorous rodents down. This then allows for plants to have a greater chance to disperse and reach full development.

== Population ecology ==
Due to the dispersal and location of the populations of kangaroo rats they have experienced isolation from other populations. In two populations a haplotype, haplotype A, was found, but it was not found in a populations further away. This suggests that there is a decrease of gene flow between the different populations of kangaroo rats. Another haplotype type designates a different story as to the genetics of this species. A haplotype CC is widespread but not in a random fashion. The haplotype CC mostly dominates in the south with very little appearance in the north and central regions. This high frequency of haplotype CC in the south and the lack of different haplotypes unrelated to haplotype CC suggest that there was a population bottleneck that occurred in the south. It seem likely that the population of southern Kangaroo rats now would have repopulated from a small group in the south due to them living in a disconnected valley from the central and northern populations.
