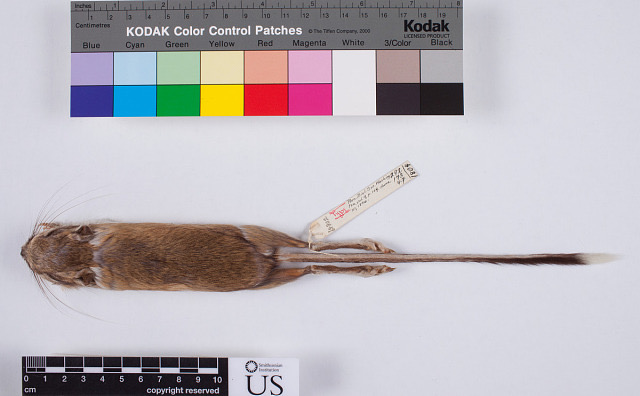
- Dipodomys elator

Conservation status
- Vulnerable (IUCN 3.1)

Scientific classification
- Kingdom: Animalia
- Phylum: Chordata
- Class: Mammalia
- Order: Rodentia
- Family: Heteromyidae
- Genus: Dipodomys
- Species: D. elator

Binomial name
- Dipodomys elator Merriam, 1894

= Texas kangaroo rat =

Species of rodent

The Texas kangaroo rat (Dipodomys elator) is a rodent of the family Heteromyidae. It is found in Texas and Oklahoma in the United States, where it often lives in association with brush species, like mesquite and lotebush, growing in areas with firm clay-loam soils. The species is listed as threatened by the Texas Parks and Wildlife Department and the IUCN lists the species as vulnerable.

== Description ==
It is a relatively large kangaroo rat that ranges in size from approximately 60 grams to 95 or more. Males and females of this species are sexually dimorphic, males being larger than females. Its distribution is within north-central Texas and it is only found within 13 counties.

== Diet and behavior ==
At one time, many thought that Texas kangaroo rats were associated with brush, especially mesquite. Recent investigations indicate that lotebush is also important and the rat may not even need brush. Burrows are not always associated with brush species and can occur on small prairie mounds. They also opportunistically use loose, friable soil that accumulates along fence lines and pasture roads. ^{[3] [4]}

The rat has been shown in a study that analyzed cheek pouch contents of several individuals to eat leaves of grasses and some perennials, stems, and seeds. In this one study area near fields that contained Johnson grass and cultivated oats, seeds from these plants were found to make up the largest part of their diet.

== Breeding ==
Breeding has not been studied extensively but generally they have a promiscuous mating system, mature early, mate all year with peaks in spring and summer, and have about 3 young per brood.

== Conservation ==
One of the largest threats that this organism faces is habitat loss and degradation due to agriculture within Texas. Monocultures like wheat fields are a large issue and under- or overgrazing rangelands can be a problem when range plants become too dense or to many cattle eat the plants that they feed on during instances of overgrazing. However, if grazing occurs properly, the rodents benefit. Proper grazing helps create amounts of bare ground needed for dust bathing, movement, seed caching, and burrow sites. This is an area that should be researched more in order to better understand their habitat selection and the effect that these land-use practices have on the organism.
