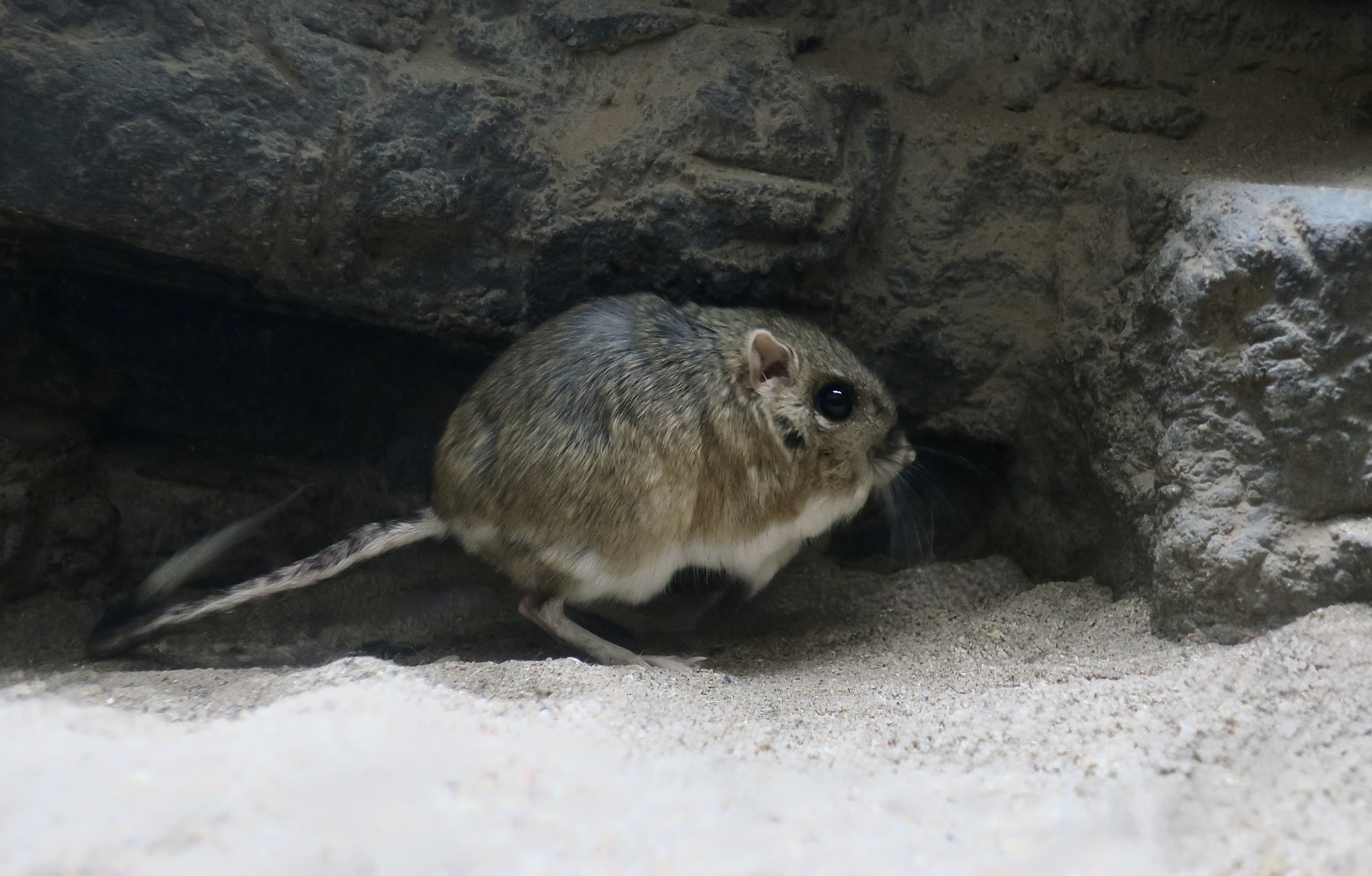
- At Wildlife World Zoo

Conservation status
- Near Threatened (IUCN 3.1)

Scientific classification
- Kingdom: Animalia
- Phylum: Chordata
- Class: Mammalia
- Order: Rodentia
- Family: Heteromyidae
- Genus: Dipodomys
- Species: D. spectabilis

Binomial name
- Dipodomys spectabilis Merriam, 1890

= Banner-tailed kangaroo rat =

Species of rodent

The banner-tailed kangaroo rat (Dipodomys spectabilis) is a species of rodent in the family Heteromyidae. It is found in arid environments in the southwestern United States and Mexico where it lives in a burrow by day and forages for seeds and plant matter by night.

== Description ==
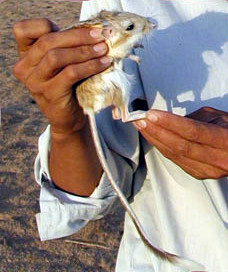
Banner-tailed kangaroo rat

The banner-tailed kangaroo rat can grow to a length of about 34 cm (13 in). The dorsal surface is ochre-buff with some black-tipped hairs and the underparts are white. The species' most distinctive characteristic is the black-banded, white-tipped bushy tail which is waved like a banner. The hind legs of the kangaroo rat are much longer than its forelegs and locomotion is by hopping.

== Distribution and habitat ==
The banner-tailed kangaroo rat is found in the southwestern United States and Mexico in two isolated populations. The range of the larger northern population includes arid parts of western Texas, much of Arizona and northern New Mexico, and the Mexican states of Sonora, Chihuahua and Zacatecas. The southern population occurs mostly in the Mexican states of Aguascalientes and San Luis Potosí. This kangaroo rat inhabits desert grassland with isolated scrubby bushes. It dies out of an area if the shrub cover increases to over 20%.

== Behavior ==
The banner-tailed kangaroo rat is nocturnal and spends the day in a complex excavated burrow. On the surface, a characteristic mound develops as the animal digs and repairs tunnels, and removes old bedding, spoiled food and seed husks. The excavated material is ejected from one of several entrances and a mound builds up over time. Observations of a newly constructed tunnel system showed that a mound 3 m (10 ft) in diameter and 40 cm (16 in) high was created in about two years and that each burrow system is occupied by a single kangaroo rat. The silky pocket mouse (Perognathus flavus) sometimes shares a burrow with the banner-tailed kangaroo rat.

The banner-tailed kangaroo rat feeds on seeds and other parts of plants, most notably grass seeds in the form of whole seed-heads. It caches surplus food in its burrow, and is the most assiduous hoarder among the kangaroo rats. In a research study where the rats were fitted with radio-tracking equipment, individuals had a home range of about 450 m^{2} (4,844 sq ft) which overlapped slightly with that of its neighbours. Kangaroo rats emerged from their burrows soon after sunset and bounded swiftly to feeding areas, foraged for two or three hours and then hurried back to its burrow where it remained. Another burst of activity occurred a couple of hours before dawn. The foodstuffs collected and carried in the cheek pouches were seed heads and grass tufts and were stored in layers in the burrow in chambers up to 25 cm (10 in) in diameter.

The banner-tailed kangaroo rat uses foot-drumming in territorial defense, and makes a different foot-drumming signal when predators such as the eastern pine snake (Pituophis melanoleucus) are spotted. Foot-drumming seems not to be used to warn conspecifics in adjoining ranges of danger, instead being used in parental care and to inform the predator that its potential prey is alert, making the chances of successful predation low.

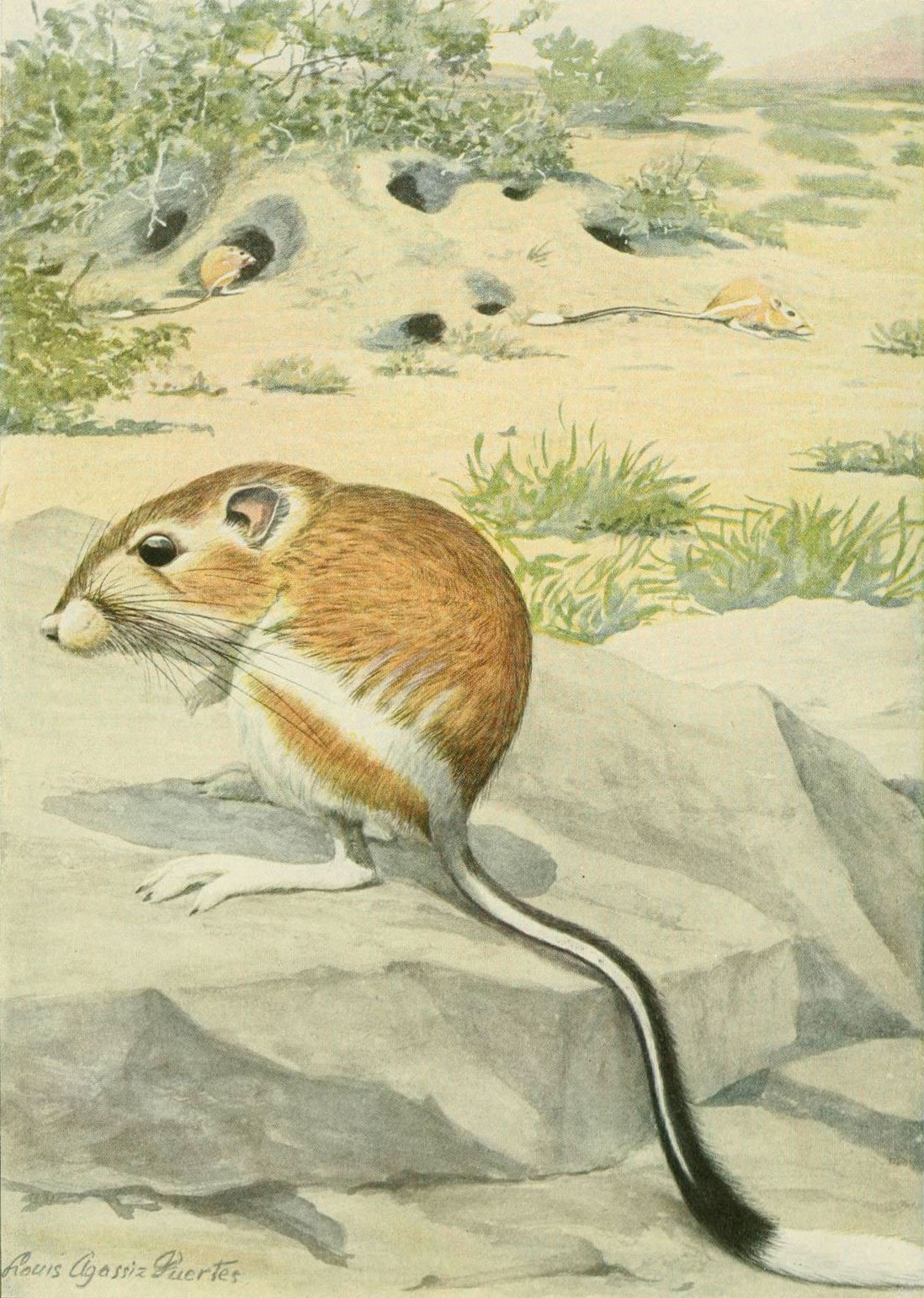
Drawing by Louis Agassiz Fuertes

== Status ==
The banner-tailed kangaroo rat has very specific habitat requirements and is threatened by invasion of the open desert grassland by creosote bush, mesquite and other woody plants. It is common in some localities, but in general the population trend is downwards and the IUCN lists its conservation status as "near threatened".
