= List of mammals of the United States =

About 490 species of mammals are recorded in the United States. Unincorporated territories such as Puerto Rico, Guam or Northern Mariana Islands are not covered. Mammals introduced and extinct in the Holocene except Pleistocene/Holocene boundary are included.

Icons which state each species' global IUCN status:
EX	Extinct	No reasonable doubt that the last individual has died
CR	Critically Endangered	In imminent risk of extinction in the wild
EN	Endangered	Facing an extremely high risk of extinction in the wild
VU	Vulnerable	Facing a high risk of extinction in the wild
NT	Near Threatened	Doesn't meet any criteria that would categorise it as risking extinction but likely to in the future
LC	Least Concern	No current identifiable risks to this species
DD	Data Deficient	Inadequate information to make an assessment of the risks to this species

Some species are identified as indicated below:

- (A) - Accidental
- (E) - Extinct
- (Ex) - Extirpated (extinct in the US, but exists elsewhere in the world)
- (I) - Introduced

and the Endangered Species Act:

E	Endangered
T	Threatened
XN, XE	Experimental nonessential or essential population
E(S/A), T(S/A)	Endangered or threatened due to similarity of appearance

== Subclass: Theria ==
=== Infraclass: Metatheria ===
==== Order: Didelphimorphia (common opossums) ====
Didelphimorphia is the order of common opossums of the Western Hemisphere. Opossums probably diverged from the basic South American marsupials in the late Cretaceous or early Paleocene. They are small to medium-sized marsupials, about the size of a large house cat, with a long snout and prehensile tail.

- Family: Didelphidae (American opossums)
  - Subfamily: Didelphinae
    - Genus: Didelphis
      - Virginia opossum, Didelphis virginiana LC

=== Infraclass: Eutheria ===
==== Order: Cingulata (armadillos) ====
The armadillos are small mammals with a bony armored shell. They are native to the Americas. There are around 20 extant species. Only the Mexican long-nosed armadillo is found in the United States.

- Family: Dasypodidae (armadillos)
  - Genus: Dasypus
    - Mexican long-nosed armadillo, Dasypus novemcinctus LC

==== Order: Rodentia (rodents) ====
Rodents make up the largest order of mammals, with over 40% of mammalian species. They have two incisors in the upper and lower jaw which grow continually and must be kept short by gnawing. Most rodents are small though the capybara can weigh up to 45 kg (99 lb).

- Suborder: Hystricognathi
  - Family: Erethizontidae (New World porcupines)
    - Genus: Erethizon
      - North American porcupine, Erethizon dorsatum LC
- Suborder: Sciurognathi
  - Family: Aplodontiidae (mountain beaver)
    - Genus: Aplodontia
      - Mountain beaver Aplodontia rufa LC
  - Family: Castoridae (beavers)
    - Genus: Castor
      - North American beaver, Castor canadensis LC
  - Family: Sciuridae (squirrels)
    - Subfamily: Sciurinae
      - Tribe: Pteromyini
        - Northern flying squirrel, G. sabrinus (Note: Burt & Grossenheider 1976 (Peterson Field Guide), Kays & Wilson 2002, North American Mammals NMNH SI, Mammal Species of the World (MSW3), IUCN Red List.) LC
          (Carolina northern flying squirrel G. s. coloratus, Virginia northern flying squirrel G. s. fuscus: E)
        - Humboldt's flying squirrel, G. oregonensis
        - Southern flying squirrel, G. volans LC
      - Tribe: Sciurini
        - Abert's squirrel, S. aberti LC
        - Arizona gray squirrel, S. arizonensis DD
        - Eastern gray squirrel, S. carolinensis LC
        - Western gray squirrel, S. griseus LC
        - Mexican fox squirrel, S. nayaritensis (Note: Mexican fox squirrel, Sciurus nayaritensis: Kays & Wilson 2002, North American Mammals NMNH SI, Mammal Species of the World (MSW3), IUCN Red List. Burt & Grossenheider 1976 (Peterson Field Guide) - only as Apache fox squirrel S. apache.) LC
        - Fox squirrel, S. niger LC
          (Delmarva fox squirrel, S. n. cinereus: E)
        - Douglas squirrel, T. douglasii LC
        - Southwestern red squirrel, T. fremonti NE
          (Mount Graham red squirrel, T. f. grahamensis: E)
        - American red squirrel, T. hudsonicus LC
    - Subfamily: Xerinae
      - Tribe: Marmotini
        - Harris's antelope squirrel, A. harrisii LC
        - Texas antelope squirrel, A. interpres LC
        - White-tailed antelope squirrel, A. leucurus LC
        - San Joaquin antelope squirrel, A. nelsoni EN
        - Gunnison's prairie dog, C. gunnisoni LC
        - White-tailed prairie dog, C. leucurus (Note: Kays & Wilson 2002, North American Mammals NMNH SI, Mammal Species of the World (MSW3), IUCN Red List.) LC
        - Black-tailed prairie dog, C. ludovicianus LC
        - Utah prairie dog, C. parvidens EN T
        - Alaska marmot, M. broweri (Alaska only) LC
        - Hoary marmot, M. caligata LC
        - Yellow-bellied marmot, M. flaviventris LC
        - Groundhog, M. monax LC
        - Olympic marmot, M. olympus LC
        - California ground squirrel, O. beecheyi LC
          - Douglas ground squirrel, O. douglasii
        - Rock squirrel, O. variegatus LC
        - Golden-mantled ground squirrel, C. lateralis LC
        - Cascade golden-mantled ground squirrel, C. saturatus LC
        - Mohave ground squirrel, X. mohavensis NT
        - Spotted ground squirrel, X. spilosoma LC
        - Round-tailed ground squirrel, X. tereticaudus LC
        - Franklin's ground squirrel, P. franklinii LC
        - Rio Grande ground squirrel, I. parvidens
        - Thirteen-lined ground squirrel, I. tridecemlineatus LC
        - Uinta ground squirrel, U. armatus LC
        - Belding's ground squirrel, U. beldingi LC
        - Northern Idaho ground squirrel, U. brunneus EN
        - Southern Idaho ground squirrel, U. endemicus (Note: Not recognized as a separate species in the Mammal Diversity Database v. 1.10.) VU
        - Columbian ground squirrel, U. columbianus LC
        - Wyoming ground squirrel, U. elegans LC
        - Arctic ground squirrel, U. parryii (Alaska only) LC
        - Richardson's ground squirrel, U. richardsonii LC
        - Townsend's ground squirrel, U. townsendii VU
        - Merriam's ground squirrel, U. canus LC
        - Piute ground squirrel, U. mollis LC
        - Washington ground squirrel, U. washingtoni NT
        - Alpine chipmunk, N. alpinus LC
        - Yellow-pine chipmunk, N. amoenus LC
          - Craters of the Moon chipmunk, N. cratericus
        - Gray-footed chipmunk, N. canipes LC
        - Gray-collared chipmunk, N. cinereicollis LC
        - Cliff chipmunk, N. dorsalis LC
        - Merriam's chipmunk, N. merriami LC
        - Least chipmunk, N. minimus LC
          - Coulee chipmunk, N. grisescens
        - California chipmunk, N. obscurus LC
        - Yellow-cheeked chipmunk, N. ochrogenys LC
        - Palmer's chipmunk, N. palmeri EN
        - Panamint chipmunk, N. panamintinus LC
        - Long-eared chipmunk, N. quadrimaculatus LC
        - Colorado chipmunk, N. quadrivittatus LC
        - Red-tailed chipmunk, N. ruficaudus LC
        - Hopi chipmunk, N. rufus LC
        - Allen's chipmunk, N. senex LC
        - Siskiyou chipmunk, N. siskiyou LC
        - Sonoma chipmunk, N. sonomae LC
        - Lodgepole chipmunk, N. speciosus LC
        - Eastern chipmunk, T. striatus LC
        - Townsend's chipmunk, N. townsendii LC
        - Uinta chipmunk, N. umbrinus LC
  - Family: Geomyidae
    - Desert pocket gopher, G. arenarius NT
    - Attwater's pocket gopher, G. attwateri LC
    - Baird's pocket gopher, G. breviceps LC
    - Plains pocket gopher, G. bursarius LC
    - Hall's pocket gopher, G. jugossicularis
    - Sand Hills pocket gopher, G. lutescens
    - Knox Jones's pocket gopher, G. knoxjonesi LC
    - Texas pocket gopher, G. personatus LC
    - Strecker's pocket gopher, G. streckeri
    - Southeastern pocket gopher, G. pinetis LC
    - Llano pocket gopher, G. texensis LC
    - Yellow-faced pocket gopher, P. castanops LC
    - Botta's pocket gopher, T. bottae (Note: Kays & Wilson 2002, North American Mammals NMNH SI, Mammal Species of the World (MSW3), IUCN Red List. Burt & Grossenheider 1976 (Peterson Field Guide) - described as the nominative species and 1 or 2 additional distinct species.) LC
    - Camas pocket gopher, T. bulbivorus LC
    - Wyoming pocket gopher, T. clusius LC
    - Idaho pocket gopher, T. idahoensis LC
    - Mazama pocket gopher, T. mazama LC
    - Mountain pocket gopher, T. monticola LC
    - Northern pocket gopher, T. talpoides LC
    - Townsend's pocket gopher, T. townsendii LC
    - Southern pocket gopher, T. umbrinus LC
  - Family: Heteromyidae
    - Subfamily: Dipodomyinae
      - Agile kangaroo rat, D. agilis LC
      - California kangaroo rat, D. californicus LC
      - Gulf Coast kangaroo rat, D. compactus LC
      - Desert kangaroo rat, D. deserti LC
      - Texas kangaroo rat, D. elator VU
      - Heermann's kangaroo rat, D. heermanni LC
        (Morro Bay kangaroo rat, D. h. morroensis: E)
      - Giant kangaroo rat, D. ingens EN E
      - Merriam's kangaroo rat, D. merriami LC (San Bernardino kangaroo rat, D. m. parvus: E)
      - Chisel-toothed kangaroo rat, D. microps LC
      - Fresno kangaroo rat, D. nitratoides VU (D. n. exilis: E, Tipton kangaroo rat, D. n. nitratoides: E)
      - Ord's kangaroo rat, D. ordii LC
      - Panamint kangaroo rat, D. panamintinus LC
      - Banner-tailed kangaroo rat, D. spectabilis NT
      - Stephens' kangaroo rat, D. stephensi VU E
      - Dulzura kangaroo rat, D. simulans LC
      - Narrow-faced kangaroo rat, D. venustus (Note: Mammal Species of the World (MSW3) and IUCN Red List, also probably North American Mammals NMNH SI - Dipodomys elephantinus merged with D. venustus as D. venustus elephantinus.) LC
      - Big-eared kangaroo rat, D. elephantinus (Note: Burt & Grossenheider 1976 (Peterson Field Guide), Kays & Wilson 2002.)
      - Dark kangaroo mouse, M. megacephalus LC
      - Pale kangaroo mouse, M. pallidus LC
    - Subfamily: Heteromyinae
      - Mexican spiny pocket mouse, L. irroratus LC
    - Subfamily: Perognathinae
      - Bailey's pocket mouse, C. baileyi LC
      - California pocket mouse, Cv californicus LC
      - Nelson's pocket mouse, C. nelsoni LC
      - Chihuahuan pocket mouse, C. eremicus LC
      - San Diego pocket mouse, C. fallax LC
      - Long-tailed pocket mouse, C. formosus LC
      - Hispid pocket mouse, C. hispidus LC
      - Rock pocket mouse, C. intermedius LC
      - Desert pocket mouse, C. penicillatus LC
      - Baja pocket mouse, C. rudinoris (Note: North American Mammals NMNH SI, Mammal Species of the World (MSW3), IUCN Red List.) LC
      - Spiny pocket mouse, C. spinatus LC
      - White-eared pocket mouse, P. alticola VU
      - Arizona pocket mouse, P. amplus LC
      - Olive-backed pocket mouse, P. fasciatus LC
      - Plains pocket mouse, P. flavescens LC
      - Silky pocket mouse, P. flavus LC
      - San Joaquin pocket mouse, P. inornatus LC
      - Little pocket mouse, P. longimembris LC
        (Pacific pocket mouse, P. l. pacificus: E)
      - Merriam's pocket mouse, P. merriami LC
      - Columbia Plateau pocket mouse, P. parvus LC
  - Family: Zapodidae (jumping mice)
    - Woodland jumping mouse, N. insignis LC
      - Western woodland jumping mouse, N. abietorum
    - Meadow jumping mouse, Z. hudsonius LC
      (Preble's meadow jumping mouse, Z. h. preblei: T)
      - Southern meadow jumping mouse, Z. luteus
    - Western jumping mouse, Z. princeps LC
      - Oregon jumping mouse, Z. oregonus
      - South Pacific jumping mouse, Z. pacificus
      - North-western jumping mouse, Z. saltator
    - Pacific jumping mouse, Z. trinotatus LC
      - Central Pacific jumping mouse, Z. montanus
  - Family: Cricetidae
    - Subfamily: Arvicolinae
      - White-footed vole, A. albipes LC
      - Red tree vole, A. longicaudus NT
      - California red tree mouse, A. pomo NT
      - Western red-backed vole, C. californicus LC
      - Southern red-backed vole, C. gapperi LC
      - Northern red-backed vole, C. rutilus (Alaska only) LC
      - Northern collared lemming, D. groenlandicus (Note: Northern collared lemming, Dicrostonyx groenlandicus: Kays & Wilson 2002, North American Mammals NMNH SI, Mammal Species of the World (MSW3) IUCN Red List. Burt & Grossenheider 1976 (Peterson Field Guide), - described separately as the nominative species but merged with D. exsul.) (Alaska only) LC
      - Nelson's collared lemming, D. nelsoni (Note: Nelson's collared lemming, Dicrostonyx nelsoni: Mammal Species of the World (MSW3), IUCN Red List. Burt & Grossenheider 1976 (Peterson Field Guide), - mentioned only in the description of D. groenlandicus as possible split (D. exsul).) (Alaska only) LC
      - Unalaska collared lemming, D. unalascensis (Note: Mammal Species of the World (MSW3), IUCN Red List.) (Alaska only) DD
      - Sagebrush vole, L. curtatus LC
      - Nearctic brown lemming, L. trimucronatus (Alaska only) LC
      - Beringian brown lemming, L. nigripes
      - Insular vole, M. abbreviatus (Alaska only) LC
      - Singing vole, M. miurus (Alaska only) LC
      - California vole, M. californicus LC (M. c. scirpen: E)
      - Gray-tailed vole, M. canicaudus LC
      - Rock vole, M. chrotorrhinus LC
      - Western meadow vole, M. drummondii
      - Florida salt marsh vole, M. dukecampbelli (M. p. dukecampbelli: E)
      - Long-tailed vole, M. longicaudus LC
      - Mexican vole, M. mexicanus (Note: Mexican vole, Microtus mexicanus: Burt & Grossenheider 1976 (Peterson Field Guide), Mammal Species of the World (MSW3), IUCN Red List - M. mexicanus. Kays & Wilson 2002 - only M. mogollonensis. North American Mammals NMNH SI - M. mexicanus listed, but only M. mexicanus mogollensis (Arizona and New Mexico) described in "Mexican Vole (Microtus mexicanus)" chapter. IUCN Red List - M. mexicanus sometimes split in two species: M. mexicanus and M. mogollonensis. 12 subspecies are recognized, 4 occur in the USA (1991), Hualapai Mexican vole M. m. hualpaiensis is listed as endangered (E) under the Endangered Species Act.) LC
        (M. m. hualpaiensis: E)
        - Mogollon vole, M. mogollonensis LC
      - Montane vole, M. montanus LC
      - Prairie vole, M. ochrogaster LC
      - Tundra vole, M. oeconomus (Alaska only) LC
      - Creeping vole, M. oregoni LC
      - Eastern meadow vole, M. pennsylvanicus LC
        - Beach vole, M. p. breweri (Note: Baker et al. 2003, Kays & Wilson 2002, North American Mammals NMNH SI, IUCN Red List.) (Note: Burt & Grossenheider 1976 (Peterson Field Guide) - mentioned only in the description of another species as possible split.) VU
      - Woodland vole, M. pinetorum LC
      - Water vole, M. richardsoni LC
      - Townsend's vole, M. townsendii LC
      - Taiga vole, M. xanthognathus (Alaska only) LC
      - Round-tailed muskrat, N. alleni LC
      - Muskrat, O. zibethicus LC
      - Western heather vole, P. intermedius LC
      - Eastern heather vole, P. ungava (Note: North American Mammals NMNH SI, IUCN Red List.) LC
      - Northern bog lemming, S. borealis LC
      - Southern bog lemming, S. cooperi LC
    - Subfamily: Neotominae
      - Northern pygmy mouse, B. taylori LC
      - White-throated woodrat, N. albigula LC
      - Bryant's woodrat, N. bryanti LC
      - Bushy-tailed woodrat, N. cinerea LC
      - Arizona woodrat, N. devia LC
      - Eastern woodrat, N. floridana LC (Key Largo woodrat, N. f. smalli: E)
      - Dusky-footed woodrat, N. fuscipes LC (N. f. riparia: E)
      - Desert woodrat, N. lepida LC
      - White-toothed woodrat, Nv leucodon LC
      - Big-eared woodrat, N. macrotis LC
      - Allegheny woodrat, N. magister NT
      - Mexican woodrat, N. mexicana LC
      - Southern plains woodrat, N. micropus LC
      - Stephen's woodrat, N. stephensi LC
      - Golden mouse, O. nuttalli LC
      - Texas mouse, P. attwateri LC
      - Brush mouse, P. boylii LC
      - California mouse, P. californicus LC
      - Canyon mouse, P. crinitus LC
      - Cactus mouse, P. eremicus LC
      - Northern Baja deer mouse, P. fraterculus LC
      - Cotton mouse, P. gossypinus LC (P. g. allapaticola: E)
      - Gambel's deer mouse, P. gambeliiNE
      - Osgood's mouse, P. gratus LC
      - Northwestern deer mouse, P. keeni LC
      - White-ankled mouse, P. pectoralis LC
      - Southern deer mouse, P. labeculaNE
      - White-footed mouse, P. leucopus LC
      - Eastern deer mouse, P. maniculatus LC
      - Black-eared mouse, P. melanotis LC
      - Mesquite mouse, P. merriami LC
      - Northern rock mouse, P. nasutus (Note: Northern rock mouse, Peromyscus nasutus: Burt & Grossenheider 1976 (Peterson Field Guide) - mentioned only in the description of Zacatecan deer mouse, Peromyscus difficilis, that P. difficilis was formerly known as P. nasuts, so range is not clear because these species are merged here.) LC
      - Oldfield mouse, P. polionotus LC (Choctawhatchee beach mouse, P. p. allophrys: E, Perdido Key beach mouse, P. p. trissyllepsis: E, St. Andrews beach mouse, P. p. peninsularis: E, Alabama beach mouse, P. p. ammobates: E, Anastasia Island beach mouse, P. p. phasma: E, Southeastern beach mouse, P. p. niveiventris: T)
      - Western deermouse, P. sonoriensisNE
      - Pinyon mouse, P. truei LC
      - Florida mouse, P. floridanus NT
      - Fulvous harvest mouse, R. fulvescens LC
      - Eastern harvest mouse, R. humulis LC
      - Western harvest mouse, R. megalotis LC
      - Plains harvest mouse, R. montanus LC
      - Salt marsh harvest mouse, R. raviventris EN E
    - Subfamily: Sigmodontinae
      - Chihuahuan grasshopper mouse, O. arenicola LC
      - Northern grasshopper mouse, O. leucogaster LC
      - Southern grasshopper mouse, O. torridus LC
      - Coues' rice rat, O. couesi LC
      - Marsh rice rat, O. palustris (Note: Burt & Grossenheider 1976 (Peterson Field Guide) - described separately as the nominative species but probably merged with another species.) LC (O. p. natator: E)
      - Arizona cotton rat, S. arizonae LC
      - Tawny-bellied cotton rat, S. fulviventer LC
      - Hispid cotton rat, S. hispidus LC
      - Yellow-nosed cotton rat, S. ochrognathus LC

==== Order: Lagomorpha (lagomorphs) ====
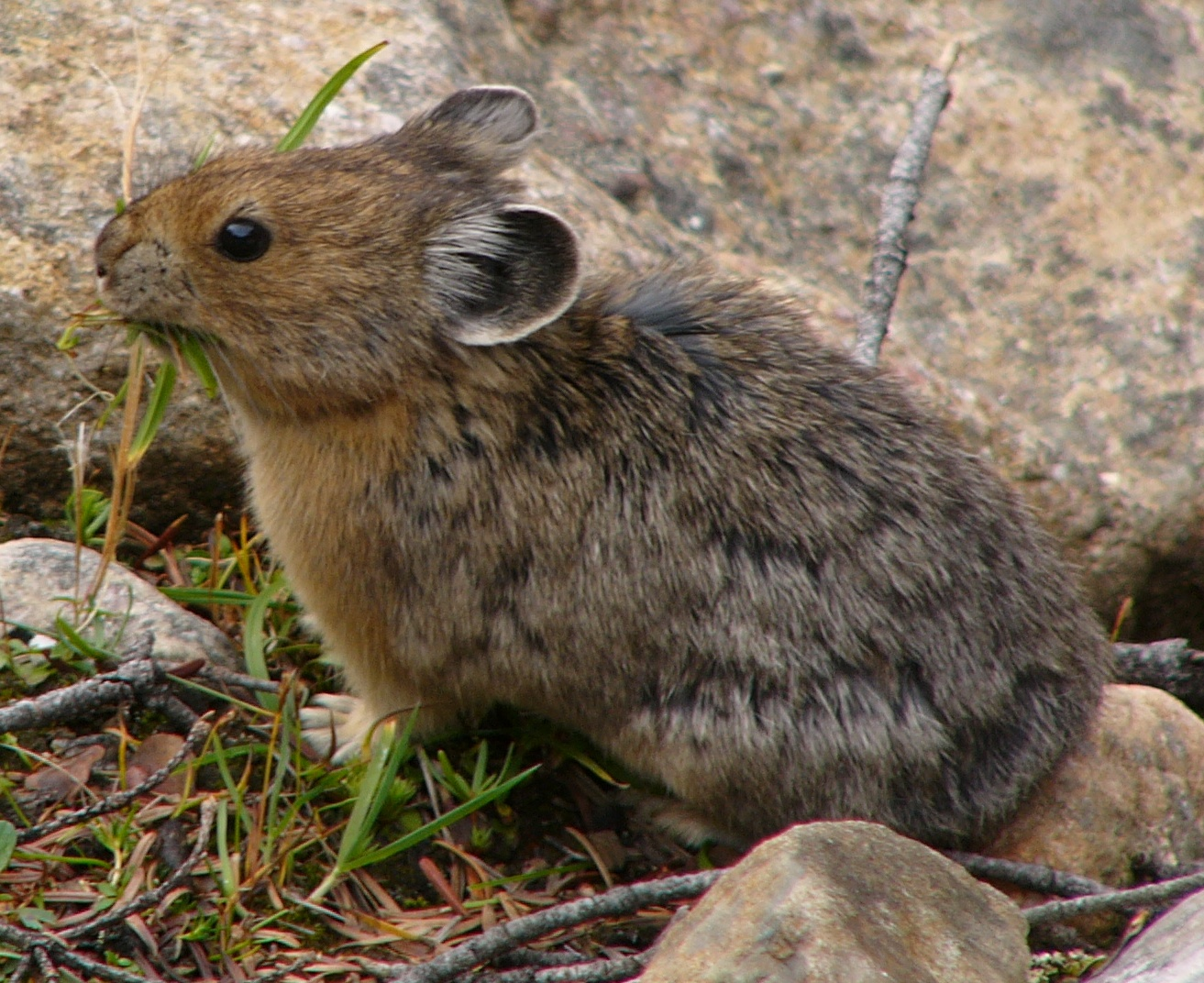
American pika

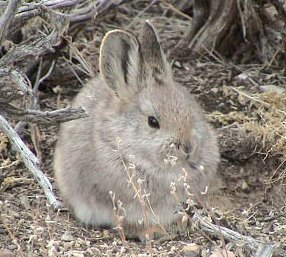
Pygmy rabbit

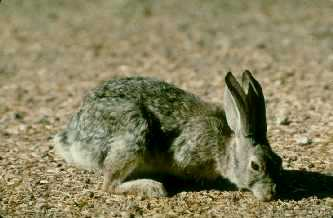
Desert cottontail

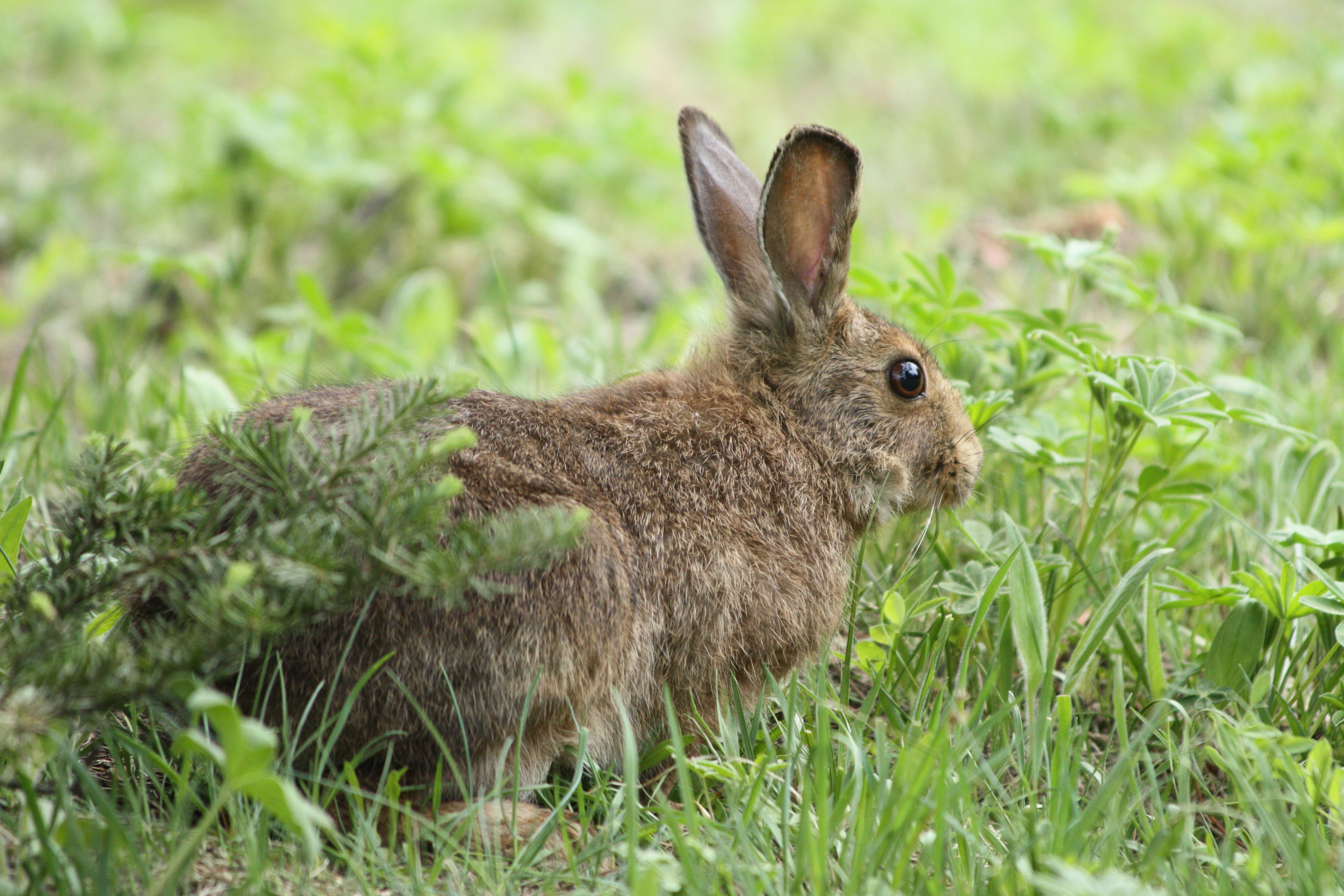
Snowshoe hare

The lagomorphs comprise two families, Leporidae (hares and rabbits), and Ochotonidae (pikas). Though they can resemble rodents, and were classified as a superfamily in that order until the early 20th century, they have since been considered a separate order. They differ from rodents in a number of physical characteristics, such as having four incisors in the upper jaw rather than two.

- Family: Ochotonidae (pikas)
  - Collared pika, O. collaris (Alaska only) LC
  - American pika, O. princeps LC
- Family: Leporidae (rabbits, hares)
  - Antelope jackrabbit, L. alleni LC
  - Snowshoe hare, L. americanus LC
  - Black-tailed jackrabbit, L. californicus LC
  - White-sided jackrabbit, L. callotis VU
  - Alaskan hare, L. othus (Alaska only) LC
  - White-tailed jackrabbit, L. townsendii LC
  - Swamp rabbit, S. aquaticus LC
  - Desert cottontail, S. audubonii LC
  - Brush rabbit, S. bachmani LC (ssp. riparius: E)
  - Eastern cottontail, S. floridanus LC
  - Robust cottontail, S. holzneri VU
  - Pygmy rabbit, S. idahoensis LC E
  - Mountain cottontail, S. nuttallii LC
  - Appalachian cottontail, S. obscurus NT
  - Marsh rabbit, S. palustris LC (Lower Keys marsh rabbit, S. p. hefneri: E)
  - New England cottontail, S. transitionalis VU

==== Order: Eulipotyphla (shrews, hedgehogs, moles, and solenodons) ====
Marsh shrew

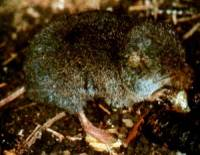
Smoky shrew

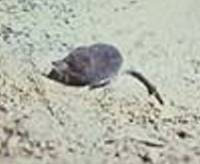
American water shrew

Eulipotyphlans are insectivorous mammals. Shrews and solenodons closely resemble mice, hedgehogs carry spines, while moles are stout-bodied burrowers.

- Family: Soricidae (shrews)
  - Subfamily: Soricinae
    - Tribe: Blarinini
      - Northern short-tailed shrew, B. brevicauda LC
      - Southern short-tailed shrew, B. carolinensis LC
      - Sherman's short-tailed shrew, B. shermani
      - Everglades short-tailed shrew, B. peninsulae
      - Elliot's short-tailed shrew, B. hylophaga LC
      - North American least shrew, C. parva LC
      - Berlandier's least shrew, C. berlandieri
    - Tribe: Notiosoricini
      - Cockrum's gray shrew, N. cockrumi LC
      - Crawford's gray shrew, N. crawfordi LC
        - Ticul's gray shrew, N. tataticuli
    - Tribe: Soricini
      - Arctic shrew, S. arcticus LC
      - Arizona shrew, S. arizonae LC
      - Marsh shrew, S. bendirii LC
      - Cinereus shrew, S. cinereus LC
        - Maryland shrew, S. fontinalis
      - Long-tailed shrew, S. dispar (Note: Long-tailed Shrew Sorex dispar: IUCN Red List. Burt & Grossenheider 1976 (Peterson Field Guide), Kays & Wilson 2002, Mammal Species of the World (MSW3), North American Mammals NMNH SI - as 2 distinct species: longtail/long-tailed shrew S. dispar and Gaspé shrew S. gaspensis.) LC
        - Gaspé shrew, S. gaspensis (Note: Gaspé shrew Sorex gaspensis: Burt & Grossenheider 1976 (Peterson Field Guide), Kays & Wilson 2002, Mammal Species of the World (MSW3), North American Mammals NMNH SI)
      - Smoky shrew, S. fumeus LC
      - Prairie shrew, S. haydeni LC
      - American pygmy shrew, S. hoyi LC
        - Western pygmy shrew, S. eximius
      - Pribilof Island shrew, S. pribilofensis (Alaska only) EN
      - Saint Lawrence Island shrew, S. jacksoni (Alaska only) LC
      - Southeastern shrew, S. longirostris LC
      - Mount Lyell shrew, S. lyelli LC
      - Merriam's shrew, S. merriami LC
      - Dwarf shrew, S. nanus LC
      - Ornate shrew, S. ornatus LC (ssp. relictus: E)
      - Montane shrew, S. monticolus LC
      - Northern montane shrew, S. obscurus NT
      - New Mexico shrew, S. neomexicanus DD
      - Pacific shrew, S. pacificus LC
      - Baird's shrew, S. bairdi LC
      - American water shrew, S. palustris LC
      - Eastern water shrew, S. albibarbis
      - Western water shrew, S. navigator
      - Glacier Bay water shrew, S. alaskanus (Alaska only) DD
      - Preble's shrew, S. preblei LC
      - Olympic shrew, S. rohweri LC
      - Fog shrew, S. sonomae LC
      - Inyo shrew, S. tenellus LC
      - Trowbridge's shrew, S. trowbridgii LC
      - Tundra shrew, S. tundrensis (Alaska only) LC
      - Barren ground shrew, S. ugyunak (Alaska only) LC
      - Vagrant shrew, S. vagrans LC
      - Alaska tiny shrew, S. yukonicus (Alaska only) LC
- Family: Talpidae (moles)
  - Subfamily: Scalopinae
    - Tribe: Condylurini
      - Star-nosed mole, C. cristata LC
    - Tribe: Scalopini
      - Hairy-tailed mole, P. breweri LC
      - Eastern mole, S. aquaticus LC
      - Northern broad-footed mole, S. latimanus LC
      - Southern broad-footed mole, S. occultus
      - Coast mole, S. orarius LC
      - Townsend's mole, S. townsendii LC
  - Subfamily: Talpinae
    - Tribe: Neurotrichini
      - Shrew-mole, N. gibbsii LC

==== Order: Chiroptera (bats) ====
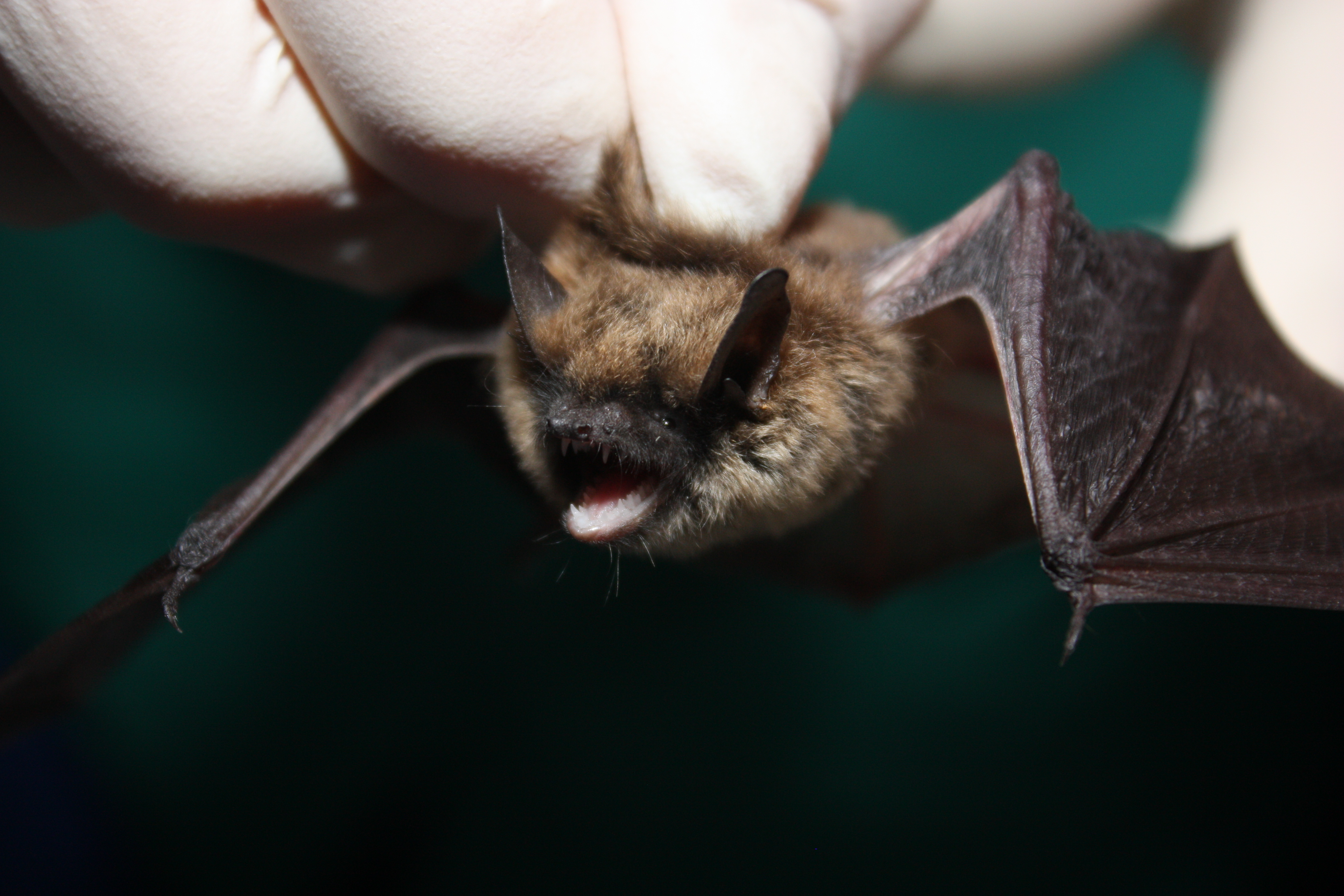
Eastern small-footed bat

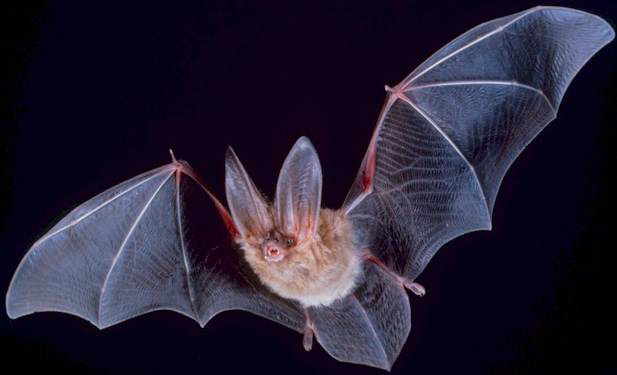
Townsend's big-eared bat

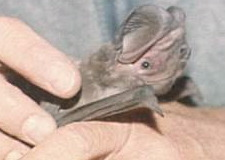
Western mastiff bat

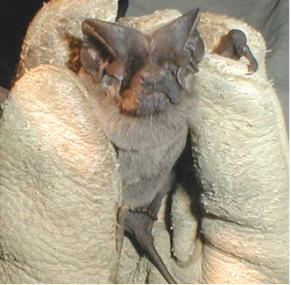
Pocketed free-tailed bat

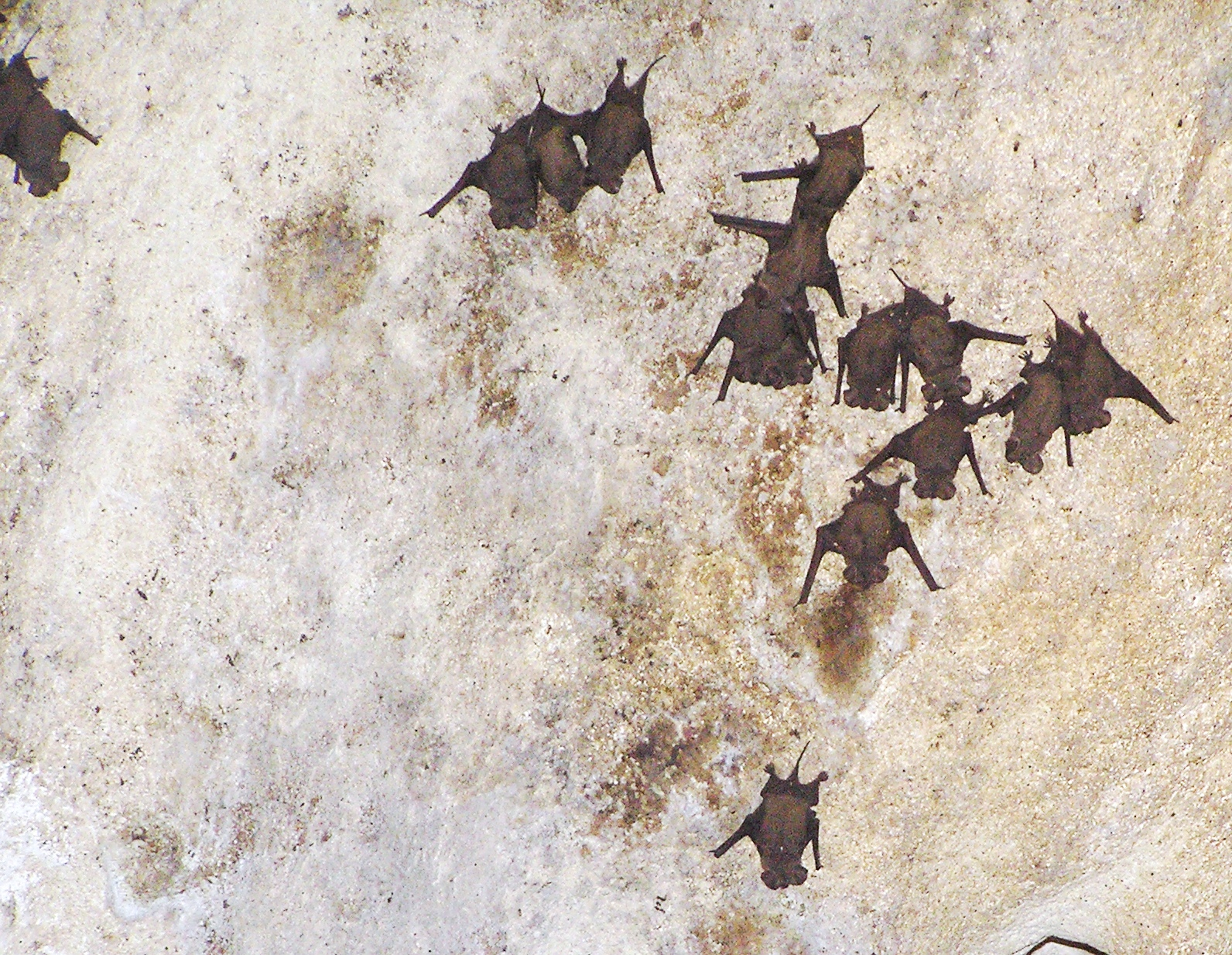
Mexican free-tailed bats

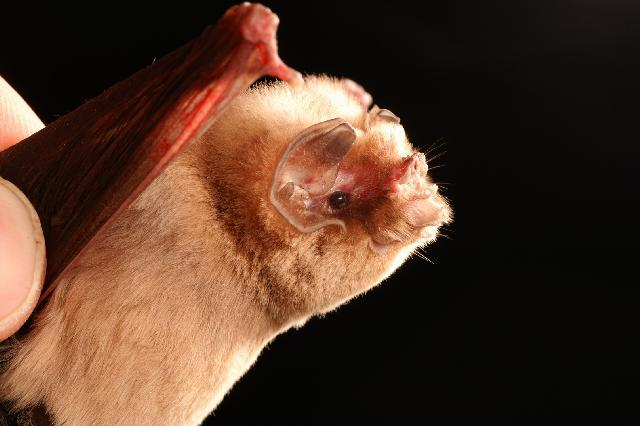
Ghost-faced bat

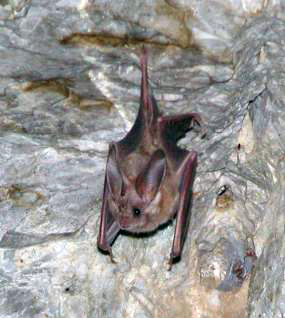
California leaf-nosed bat

The bats' most distinguishing feature is that their forelimbs are developed as wings, making them the only mammals capable of flight. Bat species account for about 20% of all mammals.

- Family: Vespertilionidae
  - Subfamily: Myotinae
    - Silver-haired bat, L. noctivagans LC
    - Southwestern myotis, M. auriculus (Note: Southwestern myotis, Myotis auriculus: Burt & Grossenheider 1976 (Peterson Field Guide) - mentioned only in the description of long-eared myotis, M. evotis, as possible split, occurring in southern N. Mexico.) LC
    - Southeastern myotis, M. austroriparius LC
    - California myotis, M. californicus LC
    - Western small-footed myotis, M. ciliolabrum LC
    - Dark-nosed small-footed myotis, M. melanorhinus LC
    - Long-eared myotis, M. evotis LC
    - Gray bat, M. grisescens VU E
    - Keen's myotis, M. keenii LC
    - Eastern small-footed myotis, M. leibii EN
    - Little brown bat, M. lucifugus EN
    - Arizona myotis, M. occultus (Note: Burt & Grossenheider 1976 (Peterson Field Guide), North American Mammals NMNH SI, Mammal Species of the World (MSW3), IUCN Red List.) LC
    - Northern long-eared myotis, M. septentrionalis NT
    - Indiana bat, M. sodalis NT E
    - Fringed myotis, M. thysanodes LC
    - Cave myotis, M. velifer LC
    - Long-legged myotis, M. volans LC
    - Yuma myotis, M. yumanensis LC
  - Subfamily: Vespertilioninae
    - Pallid bat, A. pallidus LC
    - Big brown bat, E. fuscus LC
    - Spotted bat, E. maculatum LC
    - Allen's big-eared bat, I. phyllotis LC
    - Eastern red bat, L. borealis (Note: Burt & Grossenheider 1976 (Peterson Field Guide), Kays & Wilson 2002, North American Mammals NMNH SI, IUCN Red List.) LC
    - Hoary bat, A. cinereus LC
      - Hawaiian hoary bat, A. semotus (Hawaii only) E
    - Southern yellow bat, L. ega LC
    - Desert red bat, L. frantzii LC
    - Seminole bat, L. seminolus LC
    - Southern yellow bat, D. ega (Note: Baker et al. 2003, Burt & Grossenheider 1976 (Peterson Field Guide), Kays & Wilson 2002, North American Mammals NMNH SI, IUCN Red List.) LC
    - Northern yellow bat, D. intermedius LC
    - Western yellow bat, D. xanthinus LC
    - Evening bat, N. humeralis LC
    - Western pipistrelle, P. hesperus LC
    - Eastern pipistrelle, P. subflavus VU
    - Rafinesque's big-eared bat, P. rafinesquii LC
    - Townsend's big-eared bat, P. townsendii LC
      (P. t. virginianus: E, P. t. ingens: E)
- Family: Molossidae
  - Wagner's bonneted bat, E. glaucinus LC
  - Florida bonneted bat, E. floridanus VU E
  - Western mastiff bat, E. perotis LC
  - Underwood's bonneted bat, E. underwoodi LC
  - Velvety free-tailed bat, M. molossus (Note: Velvety Free-tailed Bat: North American Mammals NMNH SI, Mammal Species of the World (MSW3), IUCN Red List. Kays & Wilson 2002 - it is believed that colonies found in buildings in the Florida Keys were members of Molossidae.) LC
  - Pocketed free-tailed bat, N. femorosaccus LC
  - Big free-tailed bat, N. macrotis LC
  - Mexican free-tailed bat, T. brasiliensis LC
- Family: Mormoopidae
  - Ghost-faced bat, M. megalophylla LC
- Family: Phyllostomidae
  - Subfamily: Phyllostominae
    - California leaf-nosed bat, M. californicus LC
  - Subfamily: Glossophaginae
    - Mexican long-tongued bat, C. mexicana NT
    - Lesser long-nosed bat, L. yerbabuenae NT E
    - Greater long-nosed bat, L. nivalis (Note: Lesser long-nosed bat, Leptonycteris yerbabuenae: Kays & Wilson 2002, North American Mammals NMNH SI, Mammal Species of the World (MSW3), IUCN Red List. Burt & Grossenheider 1976 (Peterson Field Guide) - mentioned only in the description of L. nivalis under the junior synonym L. sanborni as possible split, so range is not clear here.) EN E
  - Subfamily: Stenodermatinae
    - Velvety fruit-eating bat, E. hartii LC
  - Subfamily: Desmodontinae
    - Hairy-legged vampire bat, D. ecaudata LC

==== Order: Carnivora (carnivorans) ====
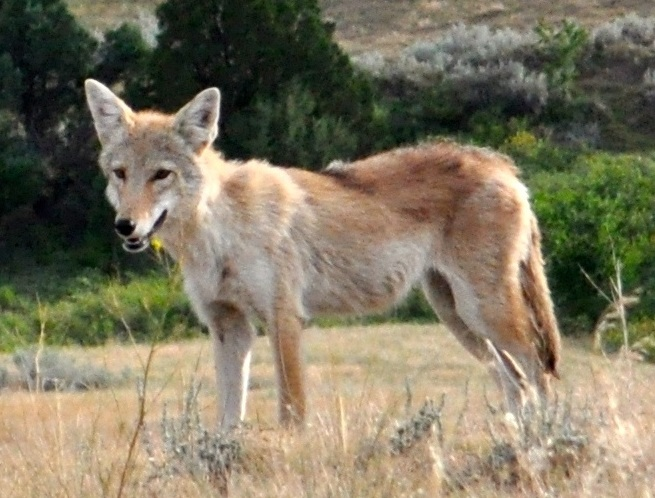
Coyote

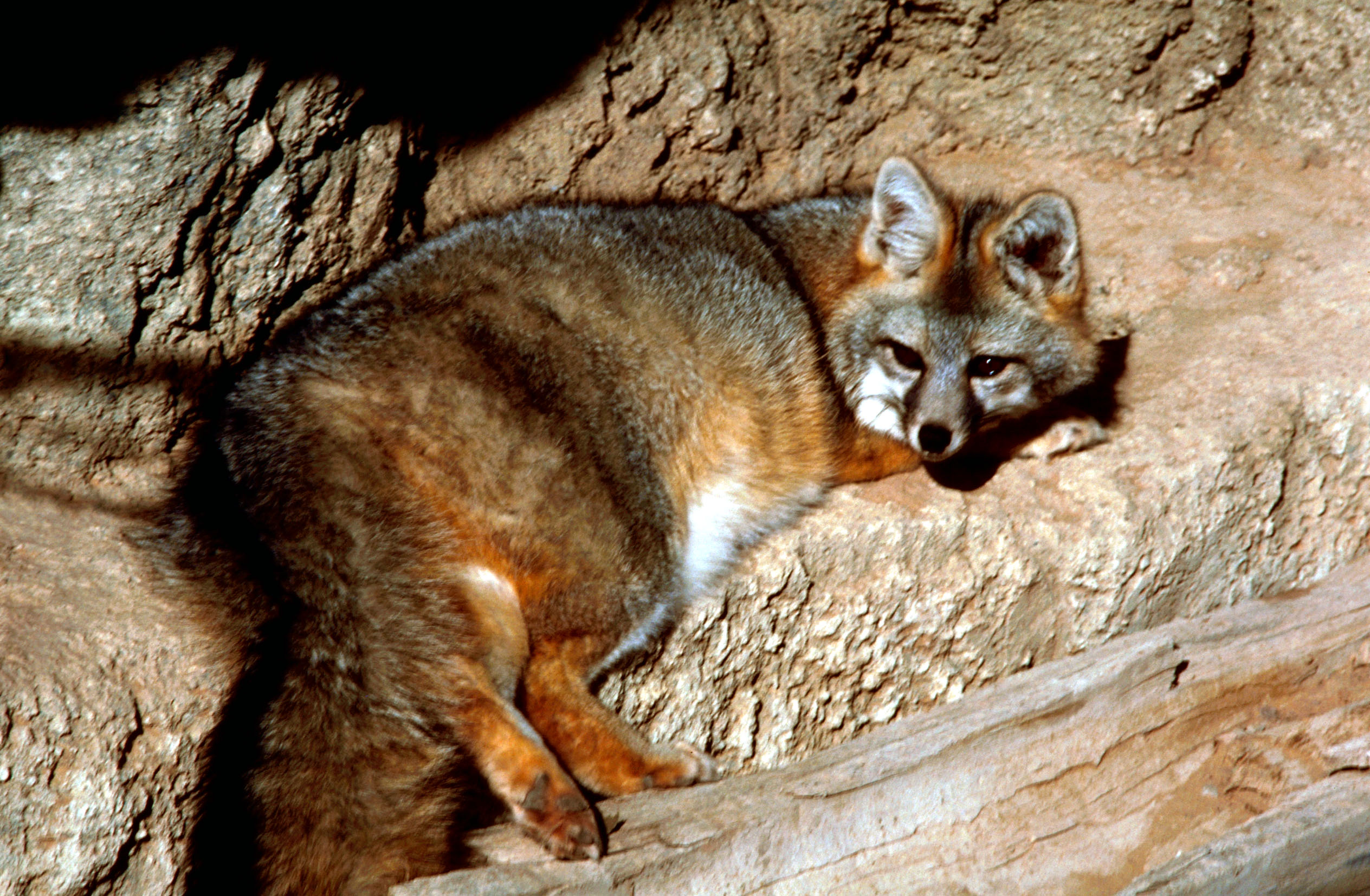
Gray fox

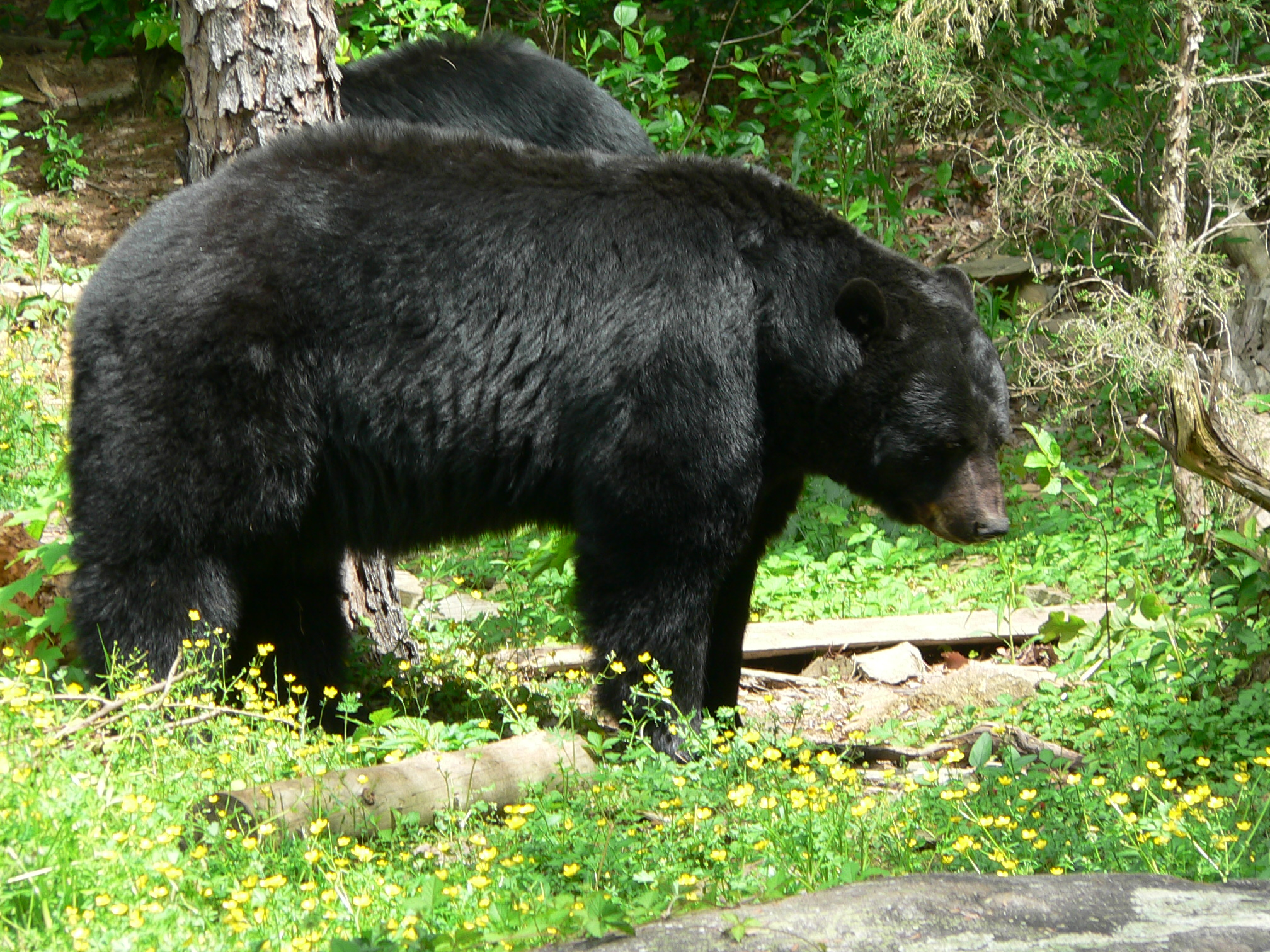
American black bear

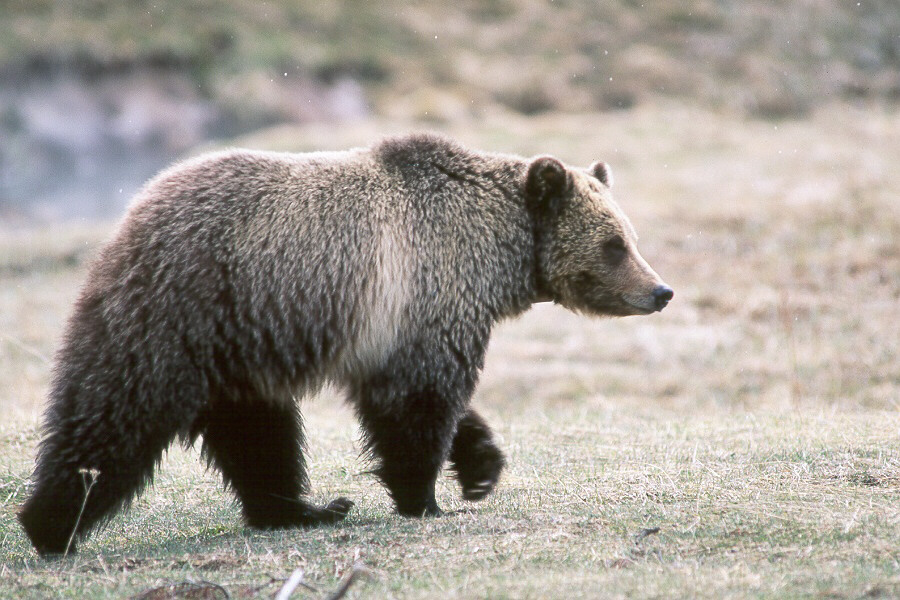
Grizzly bear

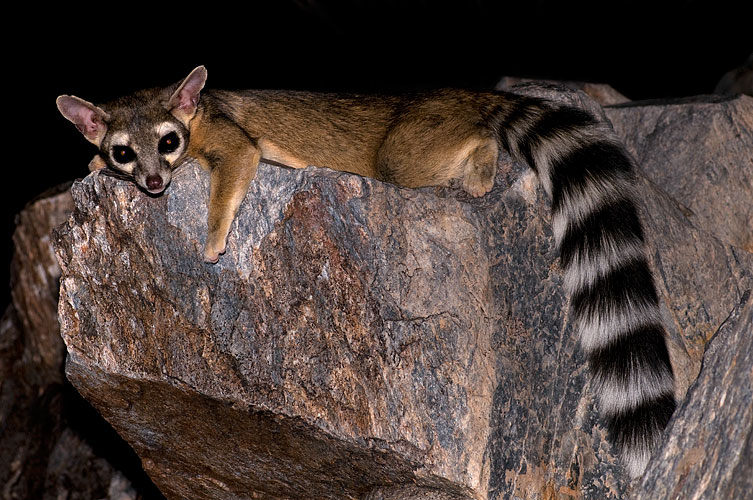
Ring-tailed cat

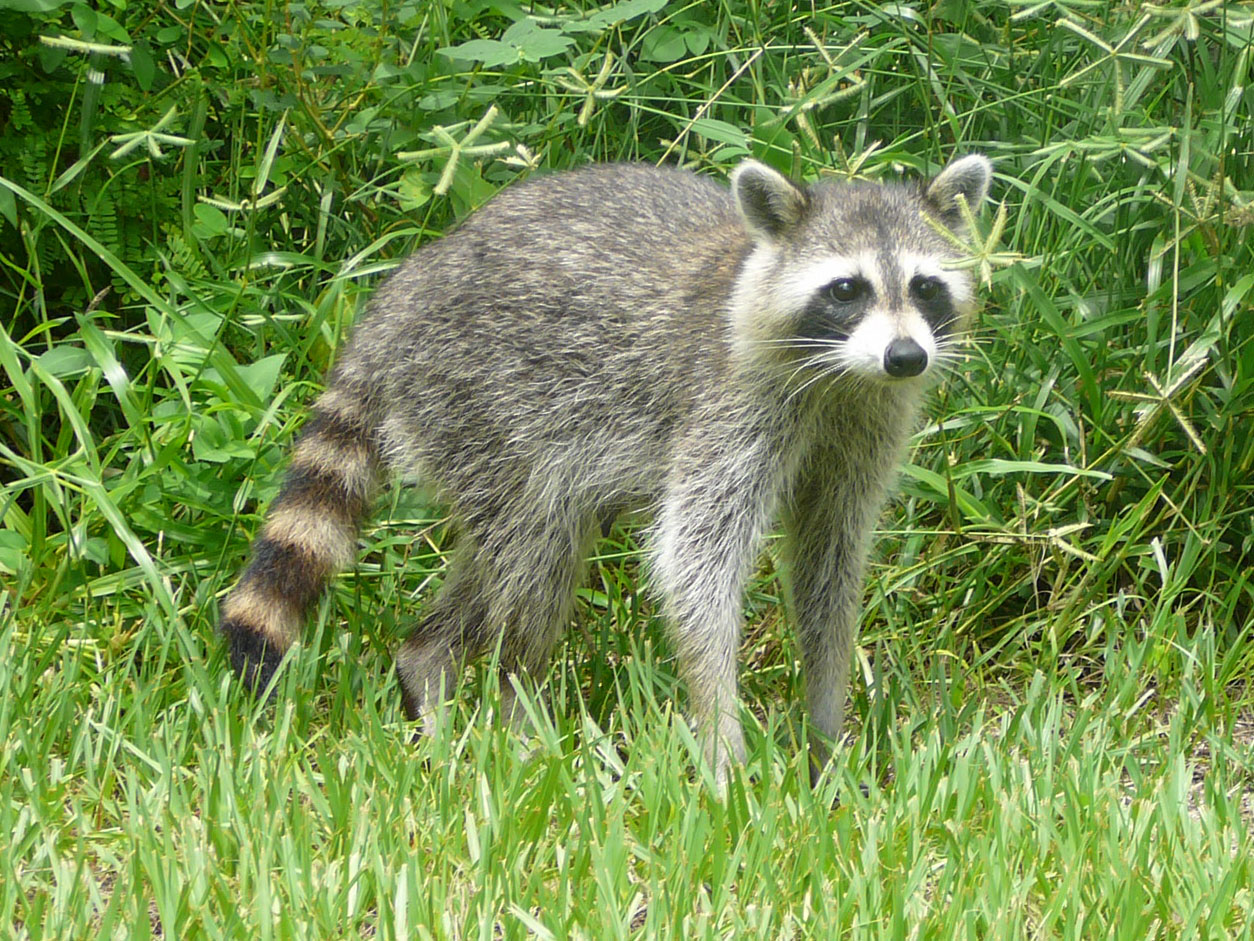
Raccoon

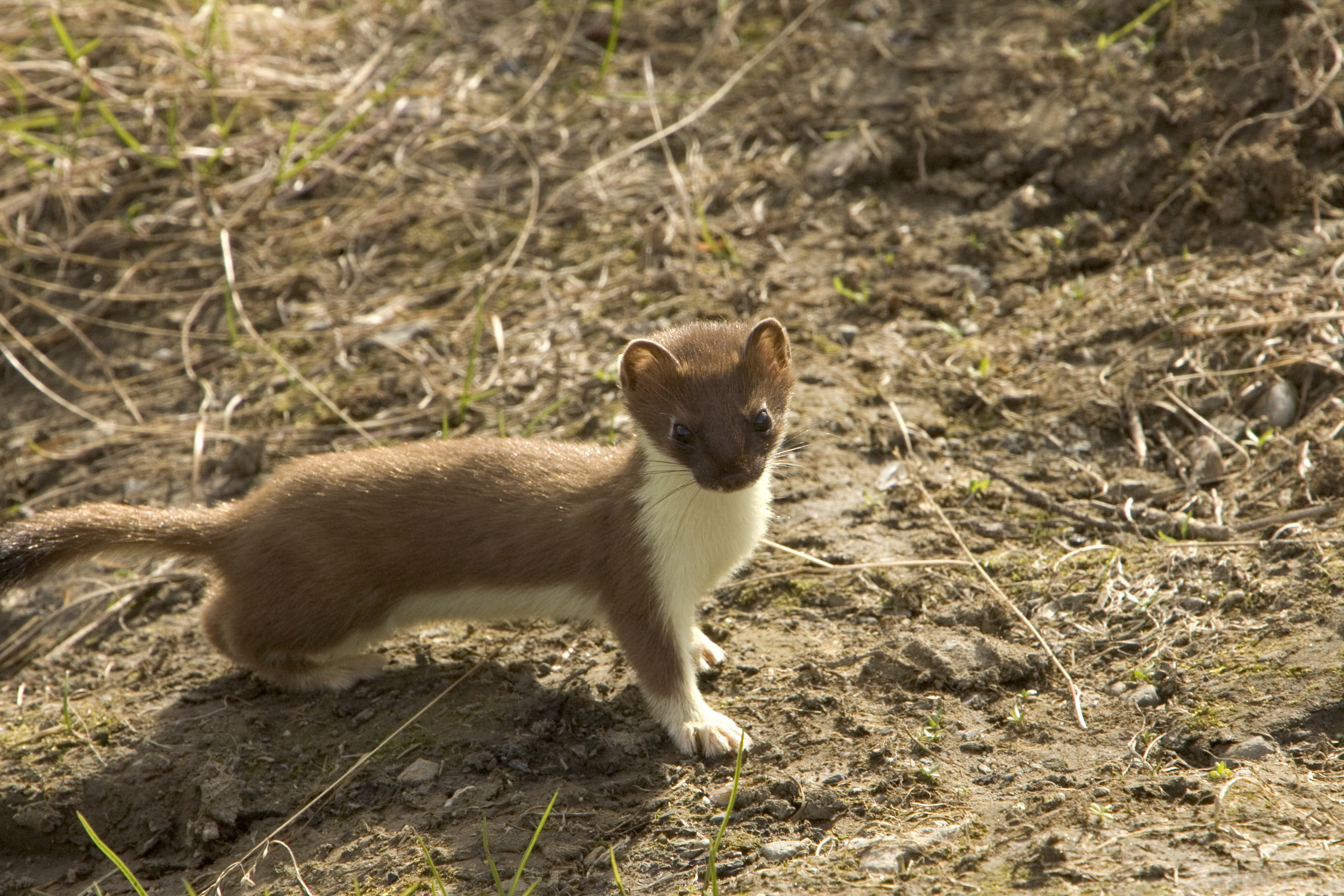
Stoat

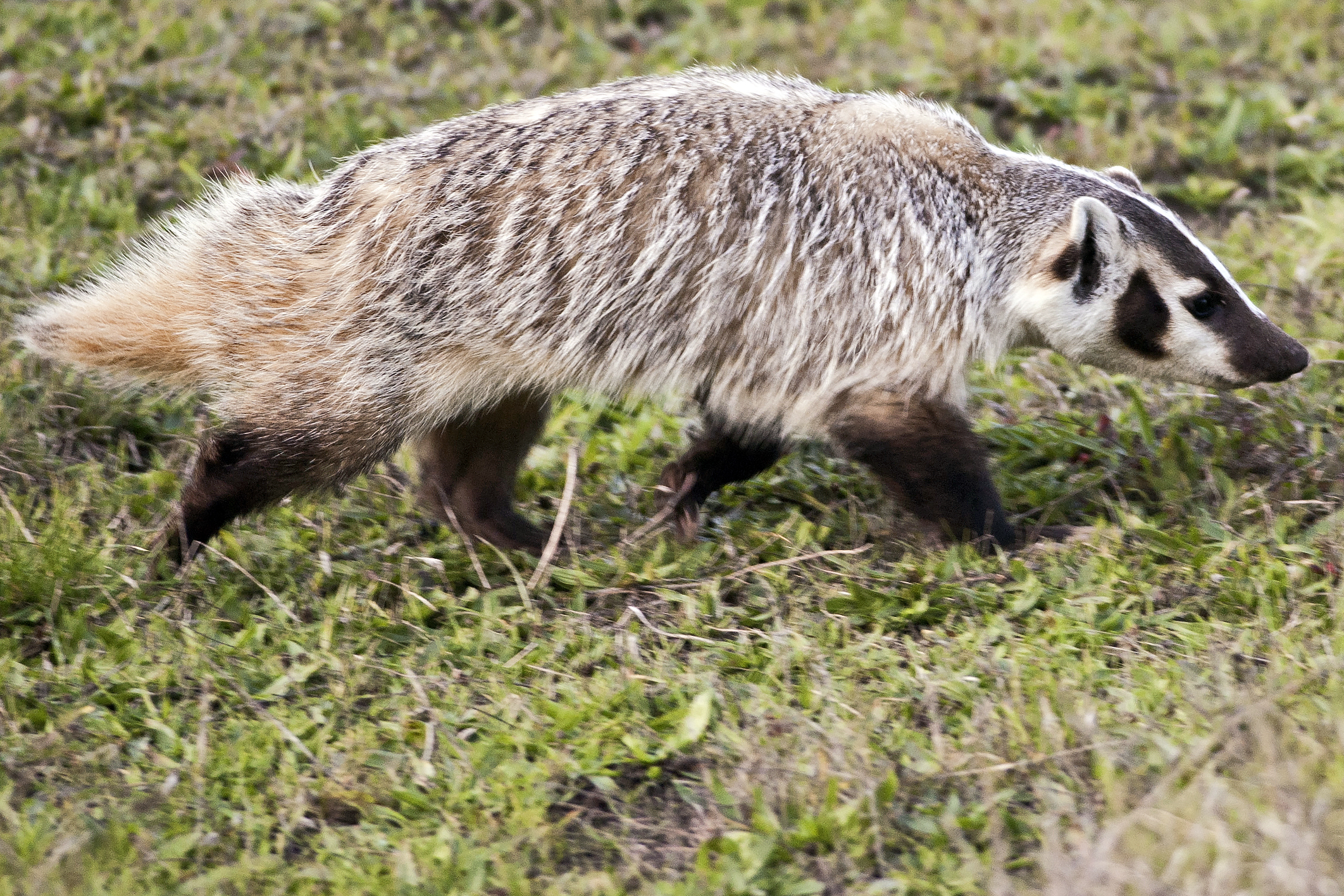
American badger

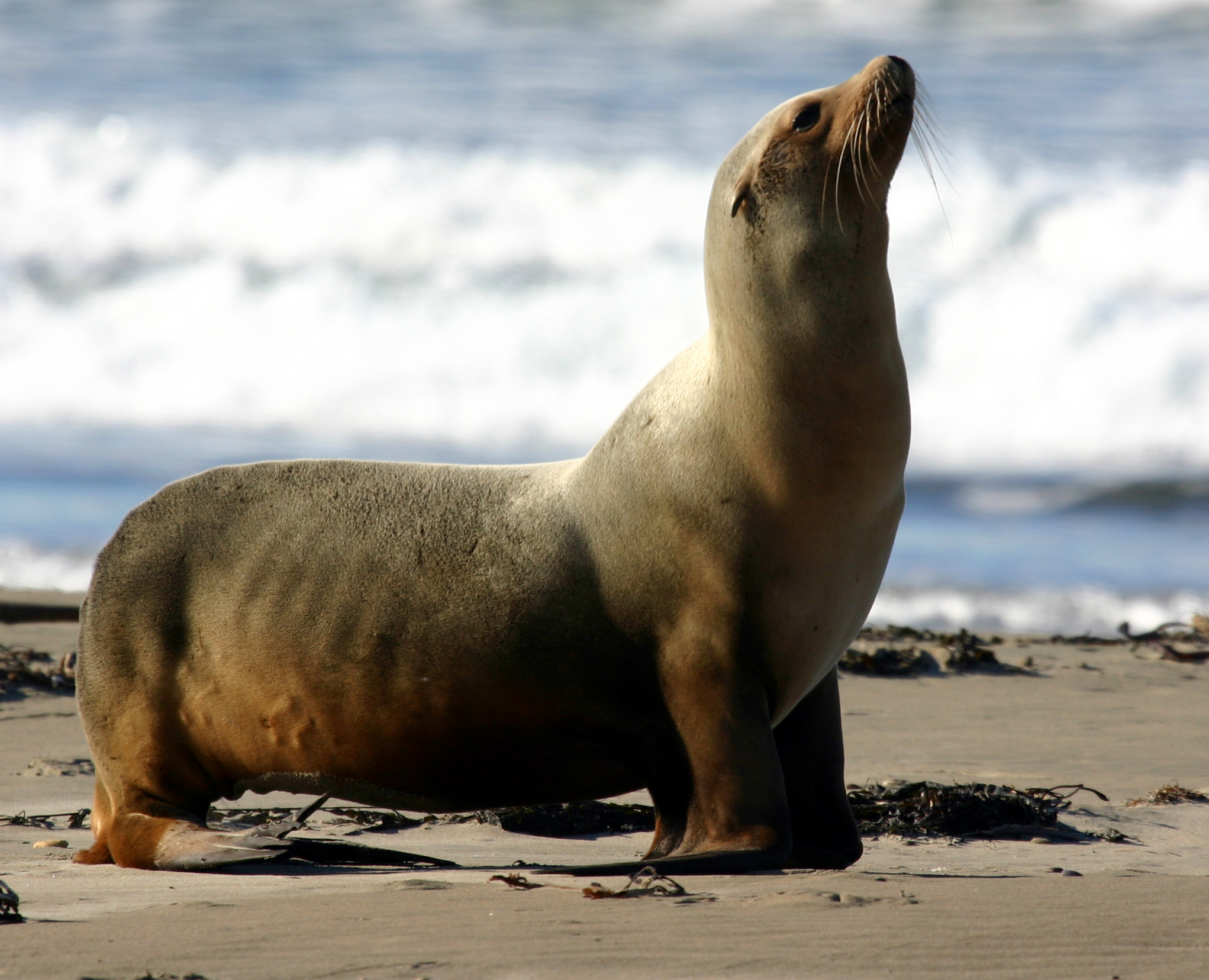
California sea lion

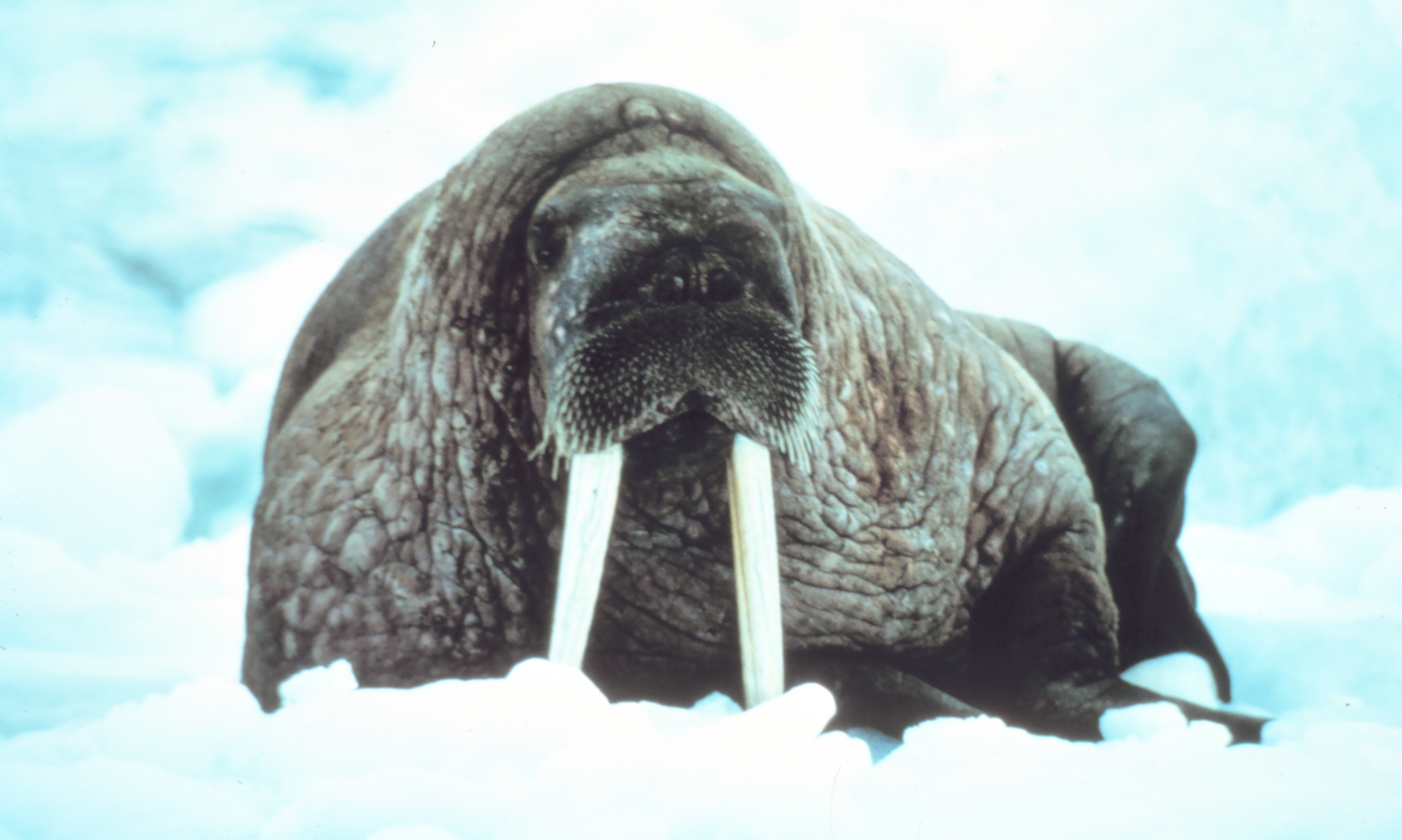
Walrus

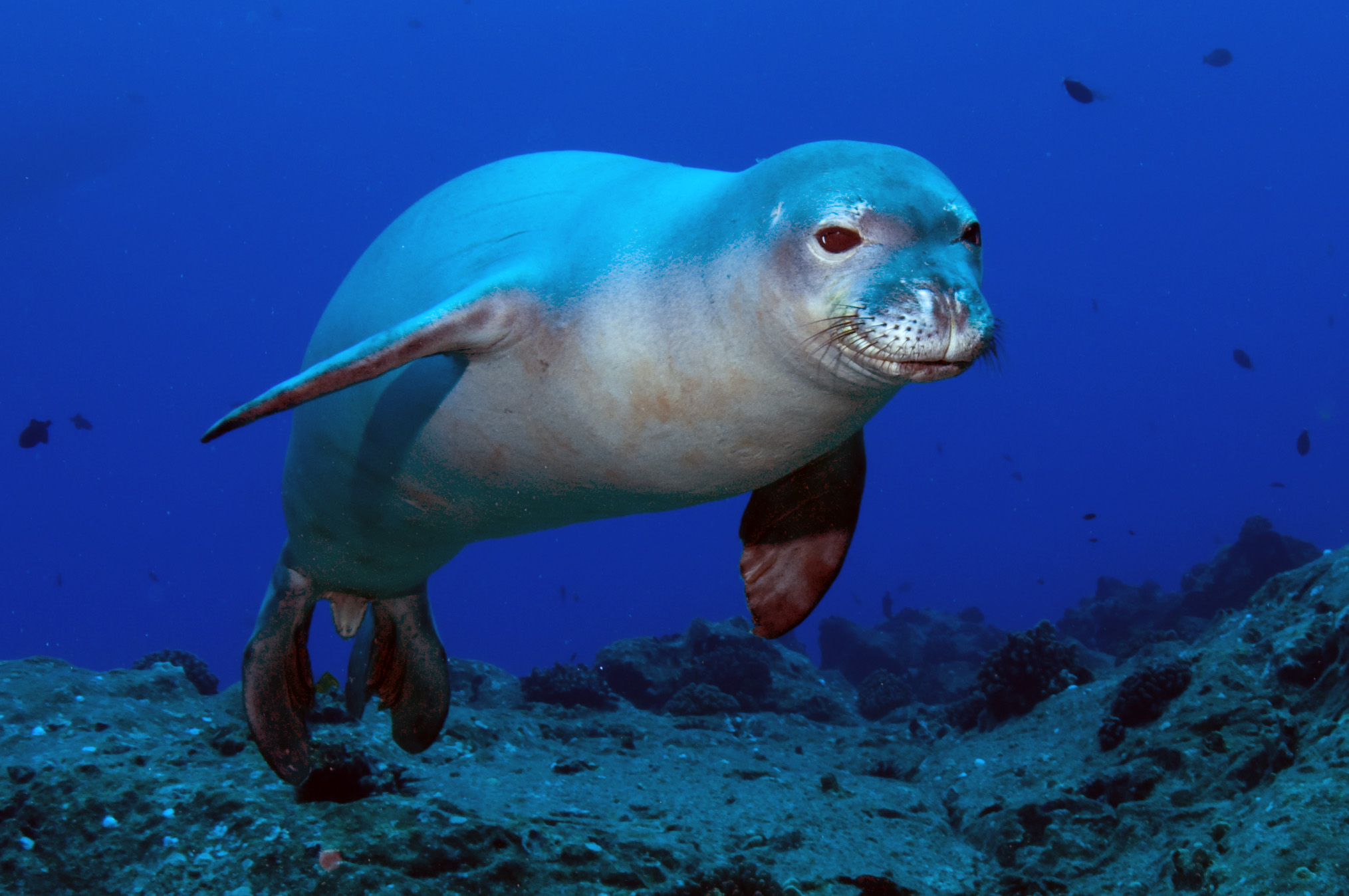
Hawaiian monk seal

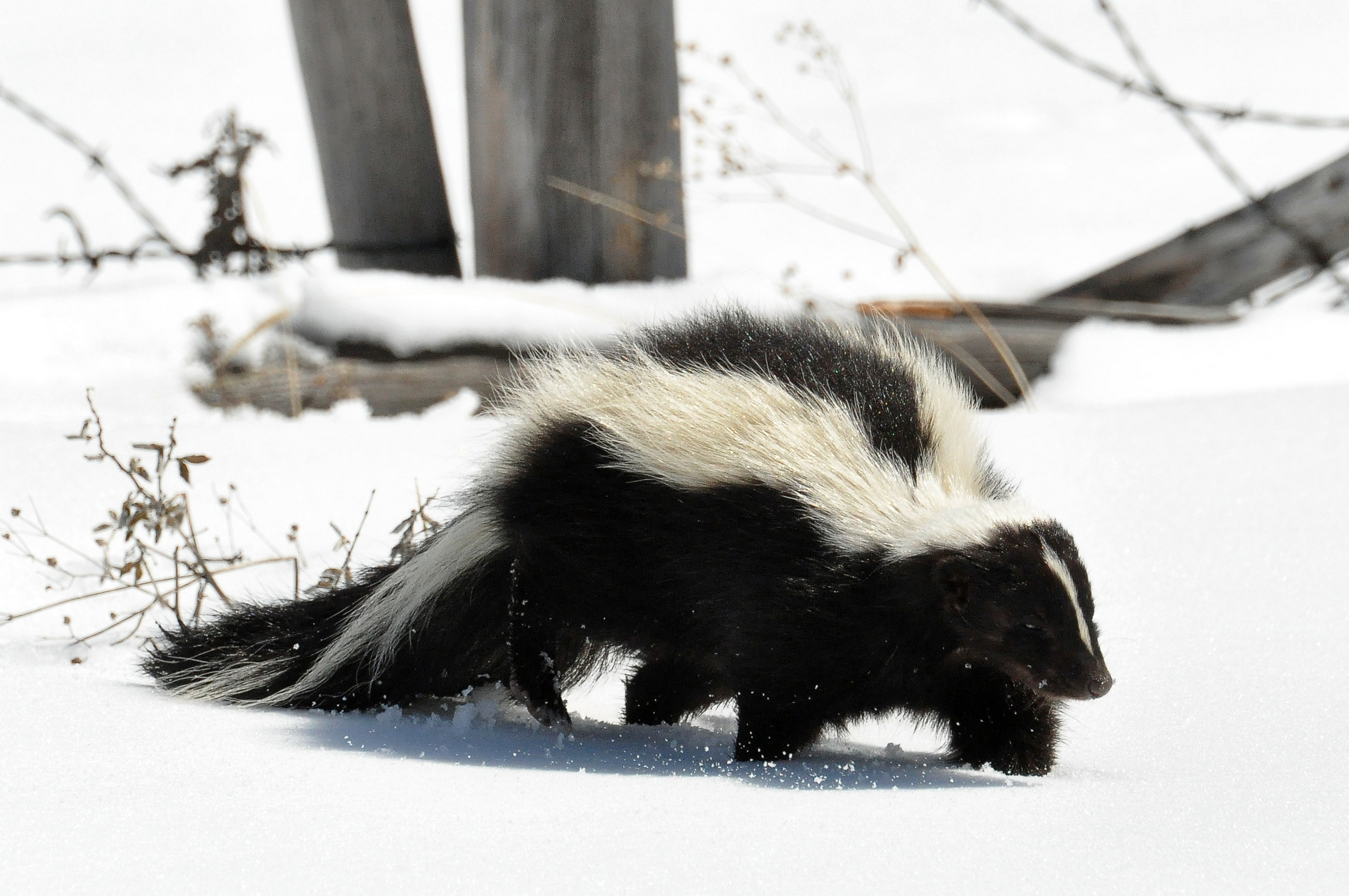
Striped skunk

There are over 260 species of carnivorans, the majority of which feed primarily on meat. They have a characteristic skull shape and dentition.

- Suborder: Feliformia
  - Family: Felidae (cats)
    - Jaguarundi, H. yagouaroundi LC (Gulf Coast jaguarundi: E)
    - Ocelot, L. pardalis LC E
    - Margay, L. wiedii (Note: Margay: Burt & Grossenheider 1976 (Peterson Field Guide), Mammal Species of the World (MSW3). Kays & Wilson 2002: last record in Texas from 1852.) (Ex?) NT
    - Canada lynx, L. canadensis LC T
    - Bobcat, L. rufus LC
    - Cougar, P. concolor LC T(S/A)
    - Jaguar, P. onca NT E
- Suborder: Caniformia
  - Family: Canidae (dogs)
    - Coyote, C. latrans LC
    - Gray wolf, C. lupus LC E XN (Arctic wolf, C. l. arctors: E XN)
    - Eastern wolf, C. lycaon NE
    - Red wolf, C. rufus (Note: https://redwolves.com/newsite/wp-content/uploads/2017/02/rw_biology_status.pdf />) CR E (and XN)
    - Gray fox, U. cinereoargenteus LC
    - Island fox, U. littoralis NT
      (U. l. littoralis: E, U. l. catalinae: E, U. l. santarosae: E, U. l. santacruzae: E)
    - Arctic fox, V. lagopus (Alaska only) LC
    - Kit fox, V. macrotis LC (San Joaquin Kit Fox, V. m. mutica: E)
    - Swift fox, V. velox LC (V. v. hebes: E)
    - Red fox, V. vulpes (Note: Burt & Grossenheider 1976 (Peterson Field Guide), Kays & Wilson 2002, North American Mammals NMNH SI, Mammal Species of the World (MSW3).) (Note: Red fox, Vulpes vulpes: Burt & Grossenheider 1976 (Peterson Field Guide) - as North American V. fulva distinct from the Old World species V. vulpes.) LC
  - Family: Ursidae (bears)
    - American black bear, U. americanus LC T(S/A)
      (Louisiana black bear, U. a. luteolus: T)
    - Brown bear, U. arctos (Note: Brown bear, Ursus arctos: Kays & Wilson 2002, North American Mammals NMNH SI, Mammal Species of the World (MSW3), IUCN Red List. Burt & Grossenheider 1976 (Peterson Field Guide) - as 2 distinct species: grizzly bear, U. horribilis and Kodiak bear, U. middendorffi, also distinct from the "worldwide" species U. arctos.) LC
      (Grizzly bear, Ursus arctos horribilis: T XN, California grizzly bear, Ursus arctos californicus: EX)
    - Polar bear, U. maritimus (Alaska only) VU T
  - Family: Procyonidae (raccoons)
    - Ring-tailed cat, B. astutus LC
    - White-nosed coati, N. narica LC
    - Raccoon, P. lotor LC
  - Family: Mustelidae (mustelids)
    - Sea otter, E. lutris EN (E. l. nereis: T, E. l. kenyoni: T, E. l. nereis: XN)
    - Wolverine, G. gulo (Note: Wolverine, Gulo gulo: Burt & Grossenheider 1976 (Peterson Field Guide) - as North American G. luscus distinct from the Old World species G. gulo.) LC
    - North American river otter, L. canadensis LC
    - American marten, M. americana LC
    - Pacific marten, M. caurina NE
    - Stoat, M. erminea LC
    - Haida ermine, M. haidarum NE (Alaska only)
    - American ermine, M. richardsonii NE
    - Black-footed ferret, M. nigripes EN E XN
    - Least weasel, M. nivalis (Note: Least weasel, Mustela nivalis: Burt & Grossenheider 1976 (Peterson Field Guide) - as North American M. rixosa distinct from the Old World species M. nivalis.) LC
    - Long-tailed weasel, N. frenata LC
    - Sea mink, N. macrodon (E) EX
    - American mink, N. vison LC
    - Fisher, P. pennanti LC
    - American badger, T. taxus LC
  - Family: Otariidae (eared seals, sealions)
    - Guadalupe fur seal, A. townsendi (Note: Guadalupe fur seal, Arctocephalus townsendi: Burt & Grossenheider 1976 (Peterson Field Guide) - as Guadalupe fur seal A. philippi, formerly A. townsendi.) LC T
    - Northern fur seal, C. ursinus VU
    - Steller sea lion, E. jubatus NT T (E. j. monteriensis: LC)
    - California sea lion, Z. californianus LC
  - Family: Mephitidae
    - American hog-nosed skunk, C. leuconotus (Note: American hog-nosed skunk, Conepatus leuconotus: Burt & Grossenheider 1976 (Peterson Field Guide), North American Mammals NMNH SI, Mammal Species of the World (MSW3), IUCN Red List. Kays & Wilson 2002 - as 2 distinct species: eastern hog-nosed skunk C. leuconotus and western hog-nosed skunk C. mesoleucus.) LC
    - Hooded skunk, M. macroura LC
    - Striped skunk, M. mephitis LC
    - Western spotted skunk, S. gracilis LC
      - Desert spotted skunk, S. leucoparia
    - Eastern spotted skunk, S. putorius VU
      - Plains spotted skunk, S. interrupta
  - Family: Odobenidae
    - Walrus, O. rosmarus (Alaska only) VU
  - Family: Phocidae (earless seals)
    - Hooded seal, C. cristata VU
    - Bearded seal, E. barbatus LC
    - Gray seal, H. grypus LC
    - Ribbon seal, H. fasciata (Alaska only) LC
    - Northern elephant seal, M. angustirostris LC
    - Hawaiian monk seal, N. schauinslandi (Hawaii only) EN E
    - Caribbean monk seal, N. tropicalis (Note: Burt & Grossenheider 1976 (Peterson Field Guide), Kays & Wilson 2002, Mammal Species of the World (MSW3), IUCN Red List.) (E) EX
    - Harp seal, P. groenlandicus (Note: Burt & Grossenheider 1976 (Peterson Field Guide), Mammal Species of the World (MSW3), IUCN Red List.) LC
    - Spotted seal, P. largha (Alaska only) LC T
    - Harbor seal, P. vitulina LC
    - Ringed seal, P. hispida LC

==== Order: Artiodactyla (even-toed ungulates) ====
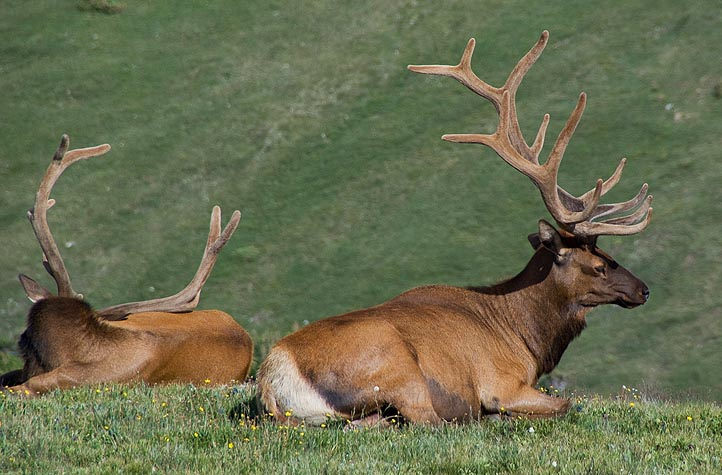
Rocky Mountain elk

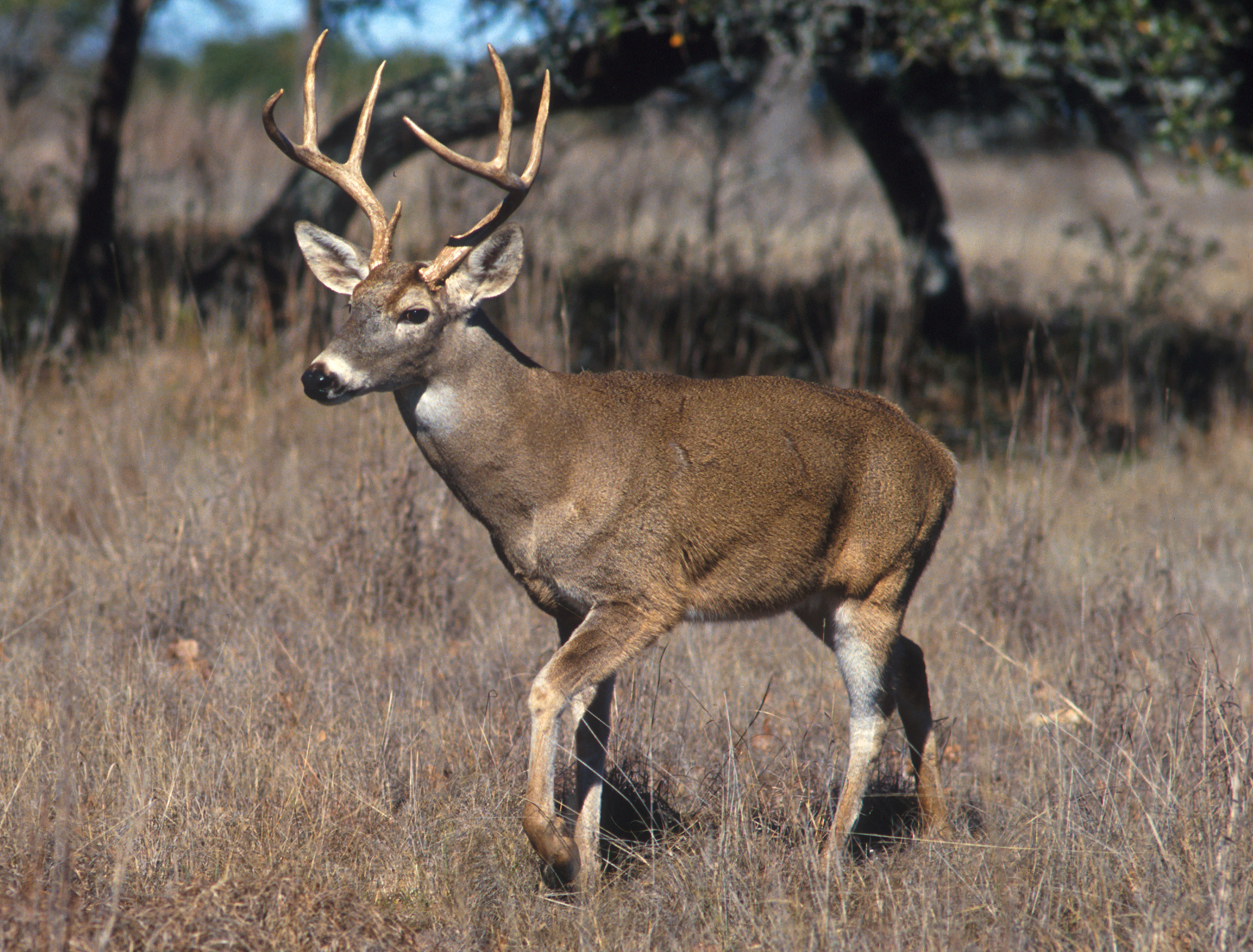
White-tailed deer

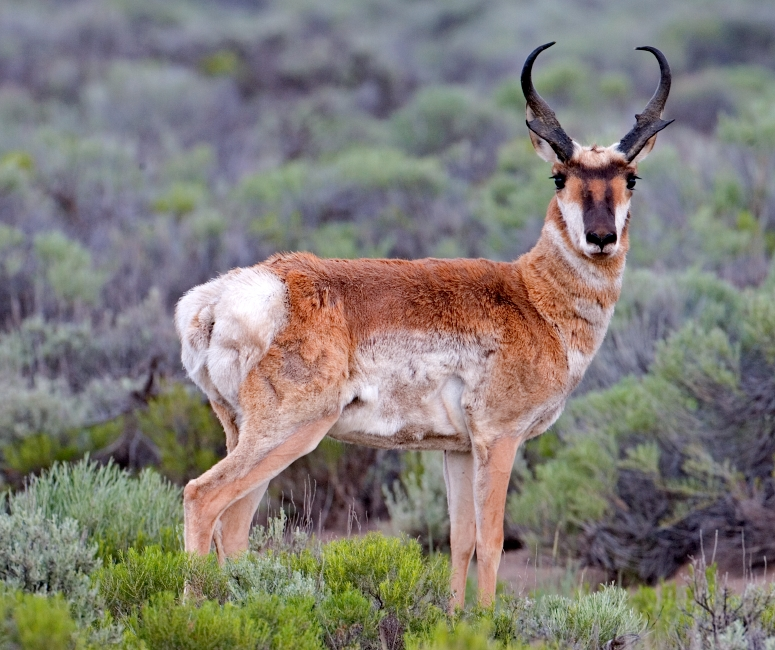
Pronghorn

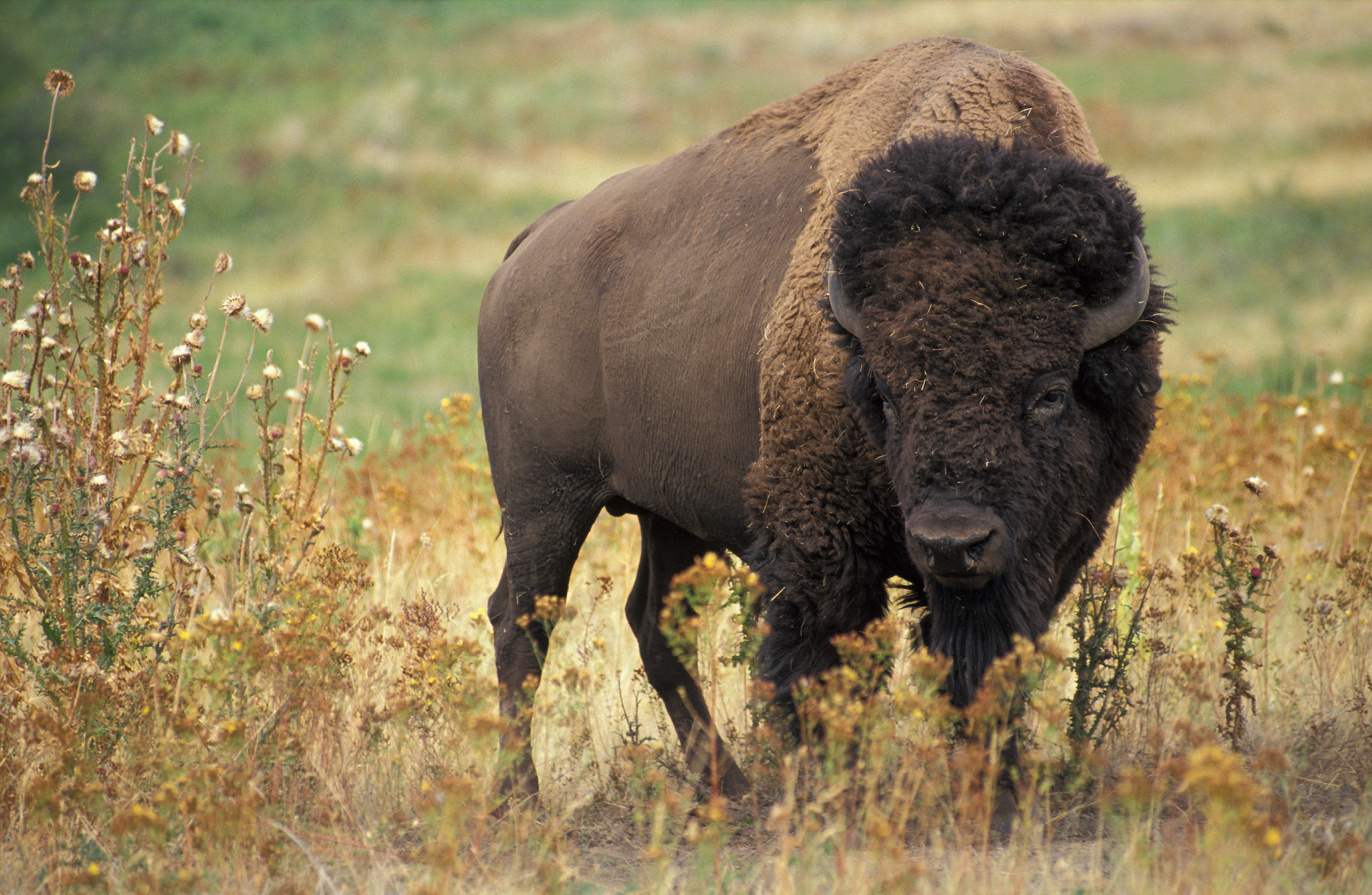
Plains bison

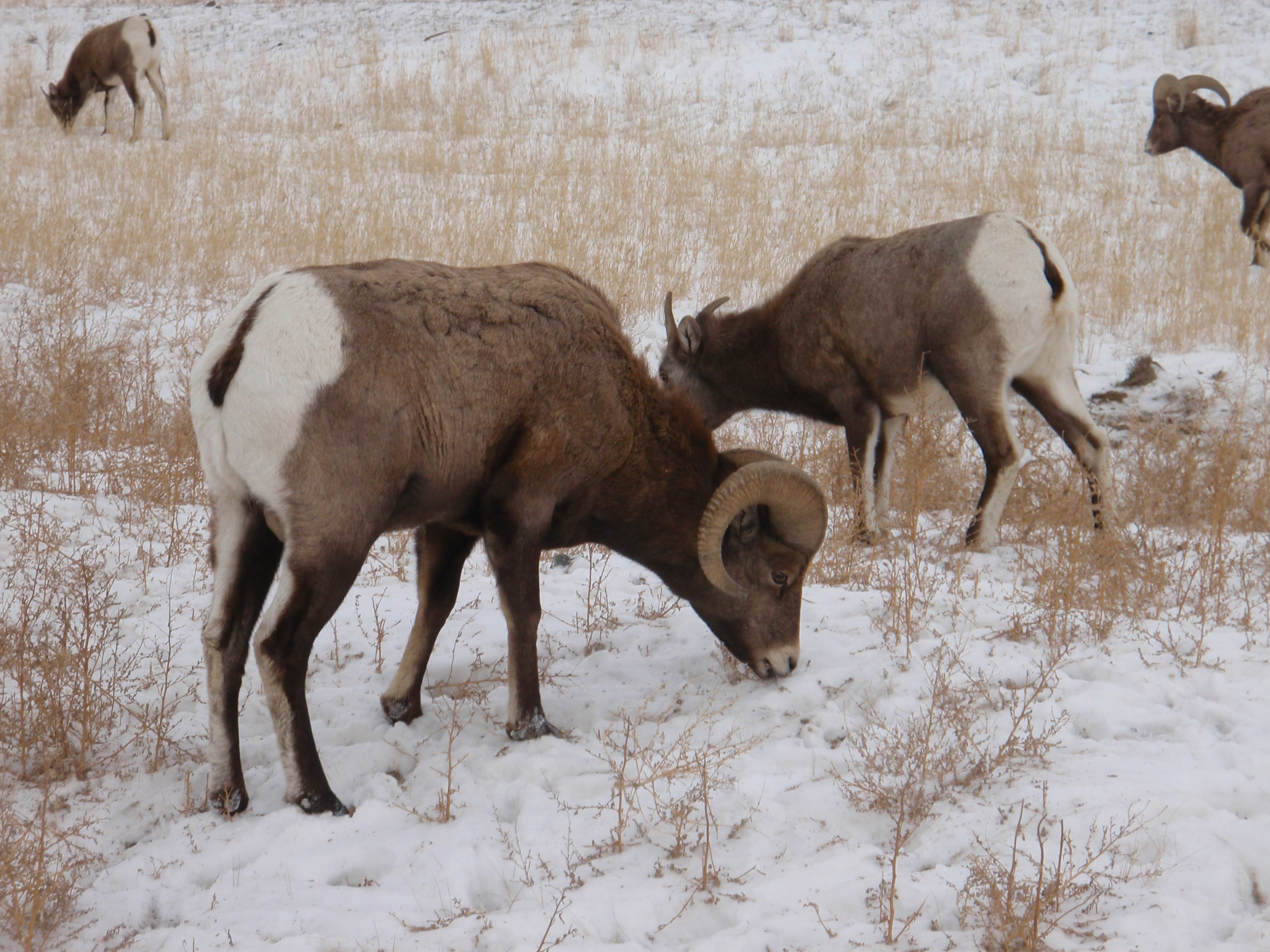
Bighorn sheep

The even-toed ungulates are ungulates whose weight is borne about equally by the third and fourth toes, rather than mostly or entirely by the third as in perissodactyls. There are about 220 artiodactyl species, including many that are of great economic importance to humans.

- Family: Tayassuidae (peccaries)
  - Collared peccary, D. tajacu LC
- Family: Cervidae (deer)
  - Subfamily: Cervinae
    - Elk, C. canadensis LC
  - Subfamily: Capreolinae
    - Moose, A. alces LC
    - Mule deer, O. hemionus LC
    - White-tailed deer, O. virginianus LC (Columbian white-tailed deer, O. v. leucurus: E, Key deer, O. v. clavium: E)
    - Caribou, R. tarandus (Alaska only, historically the northern contiguous United States from Washington to Maine) (Note: Caribou, Rangifer tarandus: Kays & Wilson 2002, North American Mammals NMNH SI, Mammal Species of the World (MSW3), IUCN Red List. Burt & Grossenheider 1976 (Peterson Field Guide) - as 3 distinct species: woodland caribou, R. caribou, barren-ground caribou, R. arcticus and Greenland caribou R. tarandus.) VU (Migratory woodland caribou, R. t. caribou: E)
- Family: Antilocapridae (pronghorn)
  - Pronghorn, A. americana LC (Sonoran pronghorn, A. a. sonoriensis: E)
- Family: Bovidae (cattle, antelope, sheep, goats)
  - Subfamily: Bovinae
    - American bison, B. bison NT (Wood bison, B. b. athabascae: T)
  - Subfamily: Caprinae
    - Mountain goat, O. americanus LC
    - Muskox, O. moschatus (Alaska only) LC
    - Bighorn sheep, O. canadensis LC (Desert bighorn sheep, O. c. nelsoni: E, Sierra Nevada bighorn sheep, O. c. sierrae: E)
    - Dall sheep, O. dalli (Alaska only) LC

==== Order: Sirenia (manatees and dugongs) ====
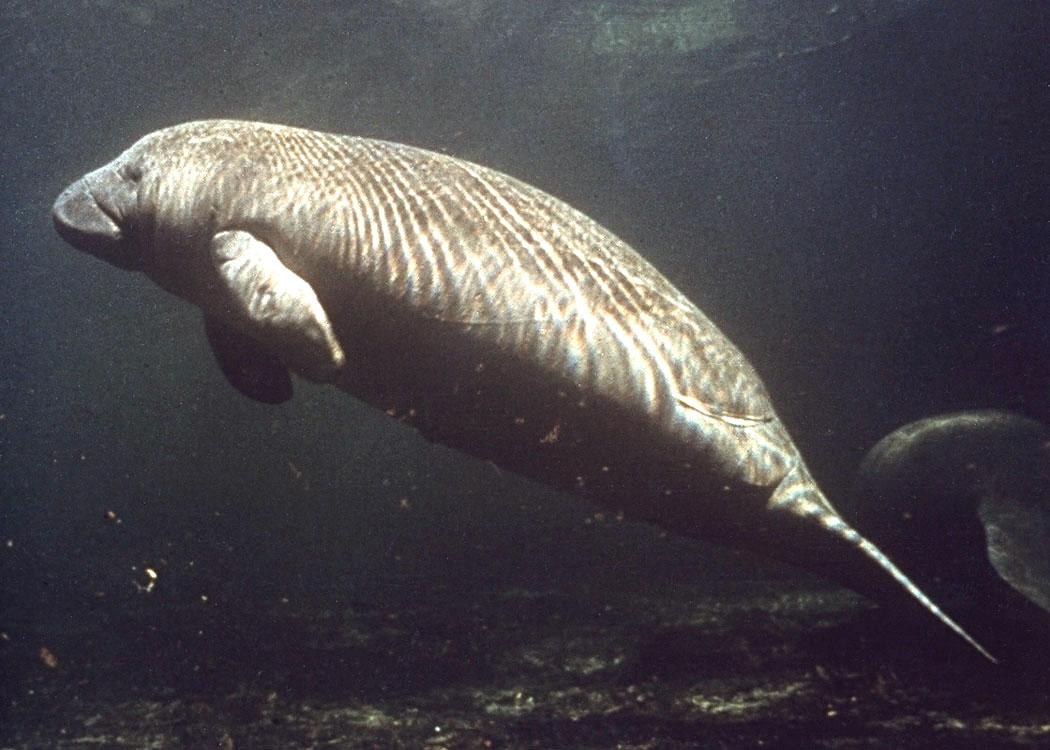
West Indian manatee

Sirenia is an order of fully aquatic, herbivorous mammals that inhabit rivers, estuaries, coastal marine waters, swamps, and marine wetlands.

- Family: Dugongidae
  - Steller's sea cow, H. gigas (Alaska only) (E) EX
- Family: Trichechidae
  - West Indian manatee, T. manatus VU E (T. m. latirostris: EN)

==== Order: Cetacea (whales) ====
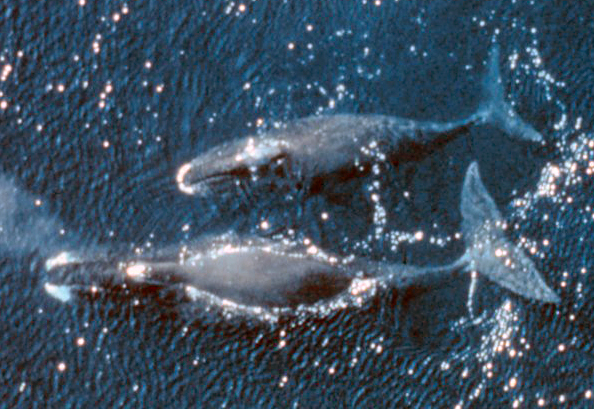
Bowhead whale

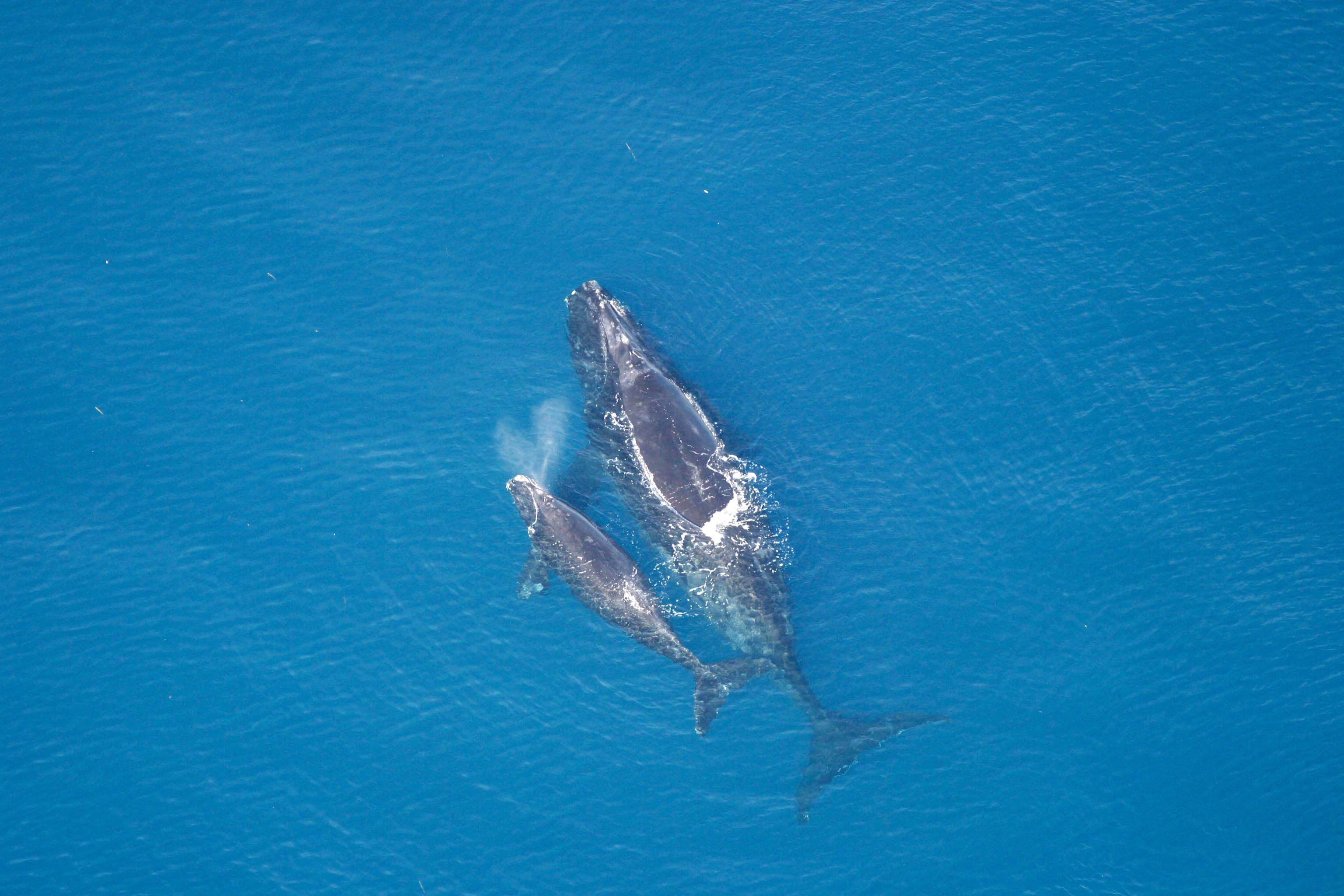
North Atlantic right whale

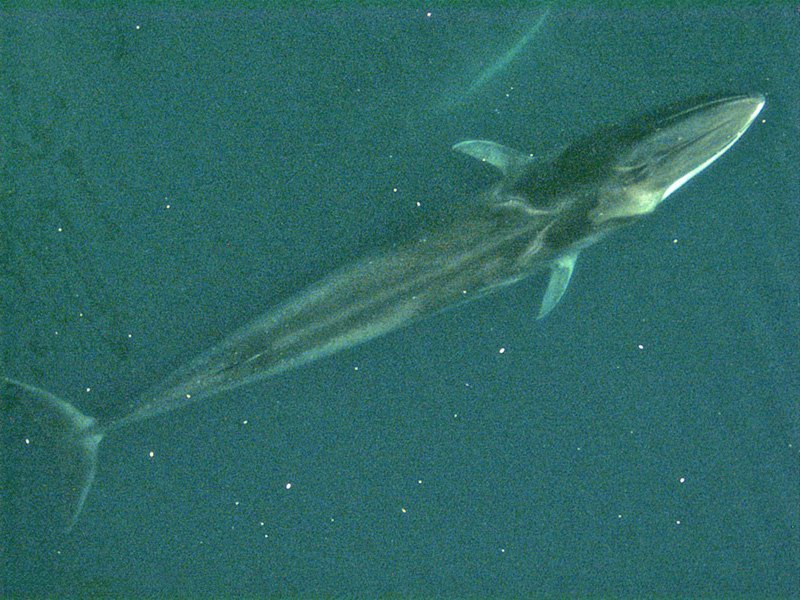
Fin whale

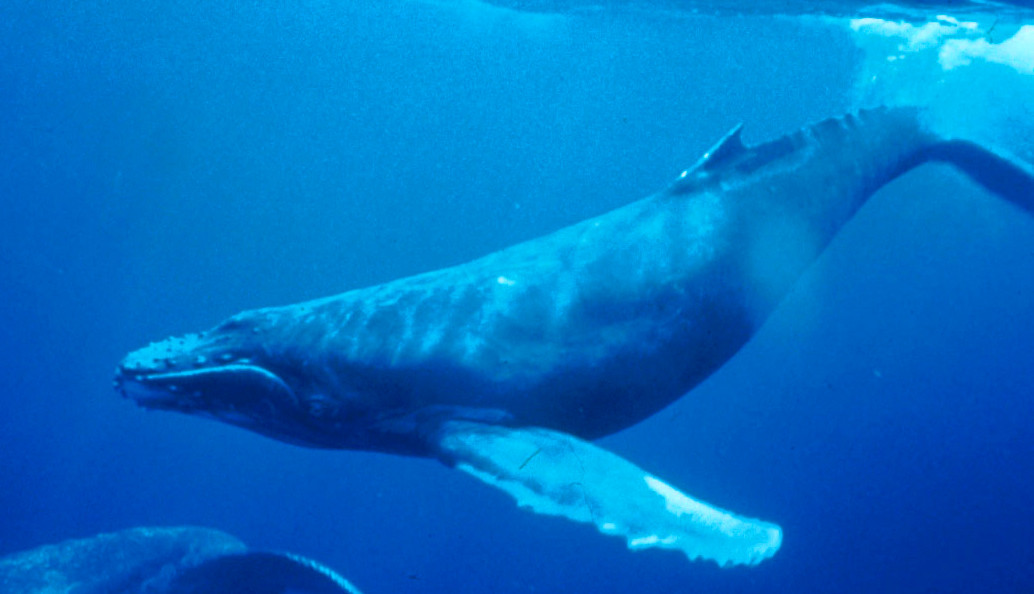
Humpback whale

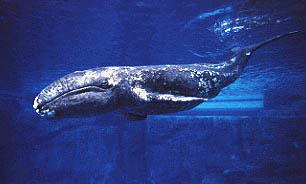
Gray whale

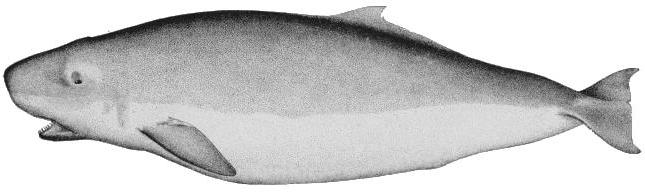
Pygmy sperm whale

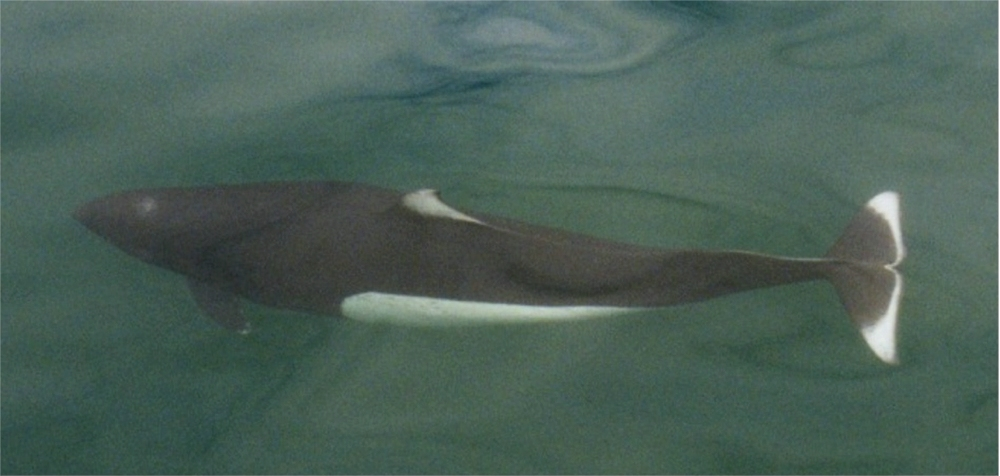
Dall's porpoise

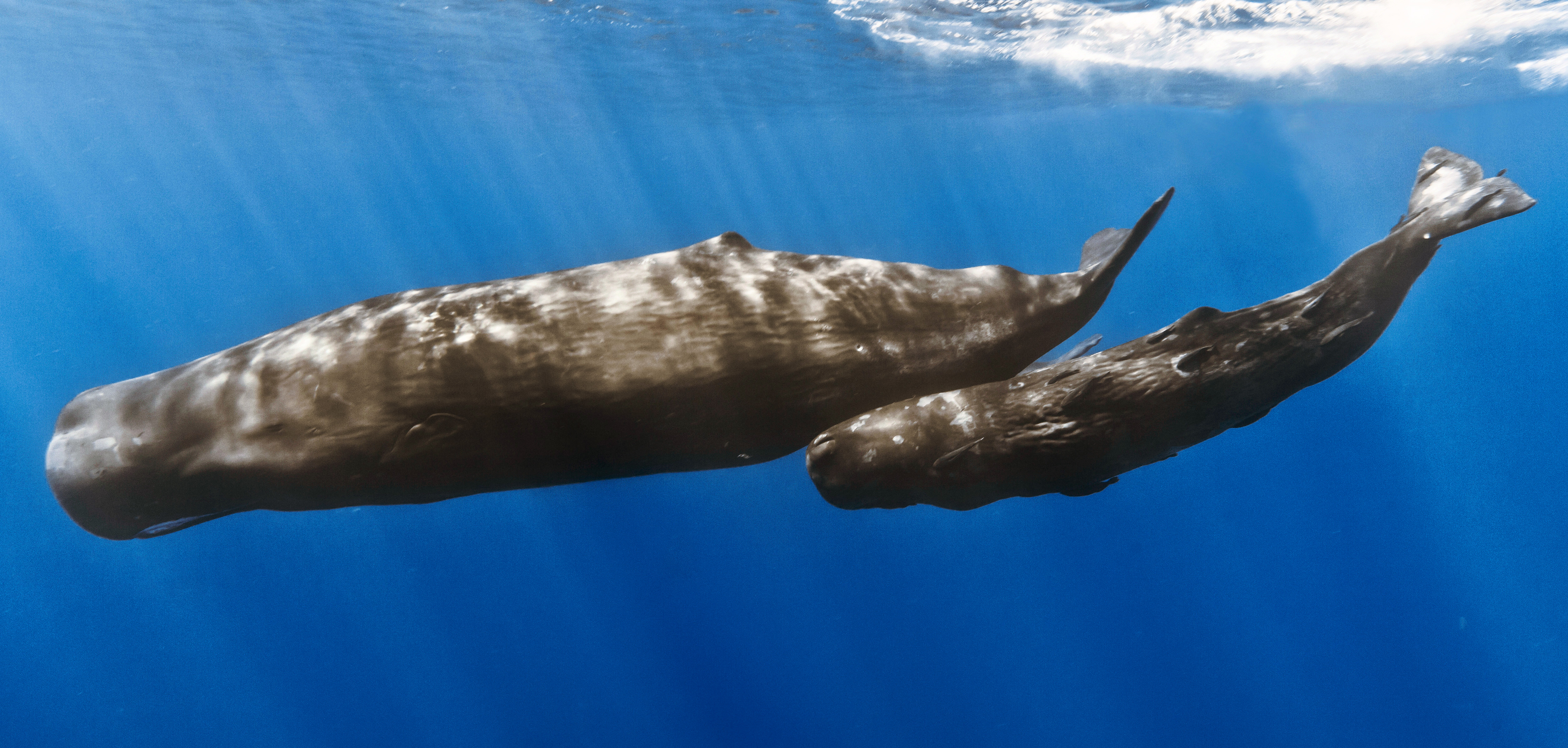
Sperm whale

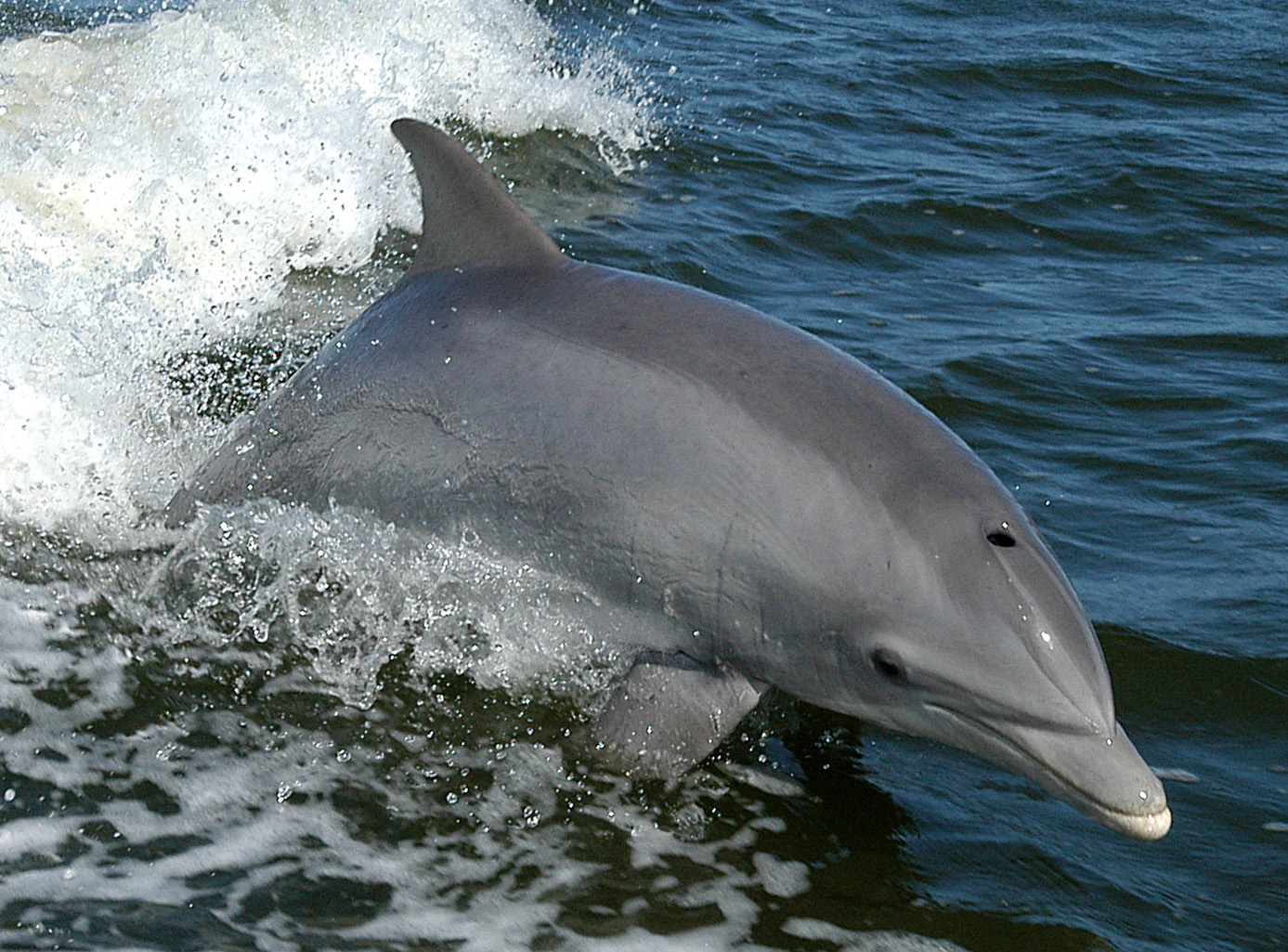
Common bottlenose dolphin

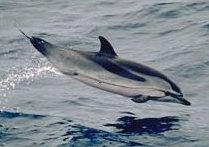
Striped dolphin

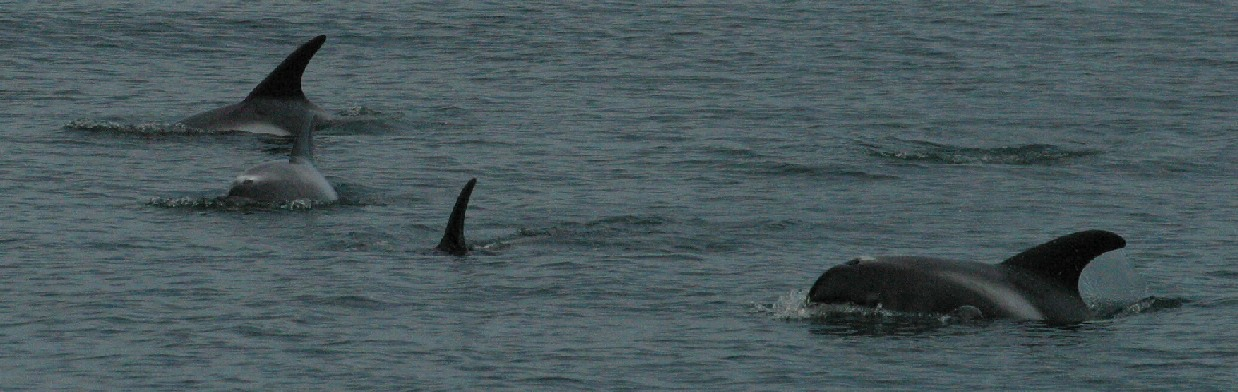
White-beaked dolphin

Killer whale

The order Cetacea includes whales, dolphins and porpoises. They are the mammals most fully adapted to aquatic life with a spindle-shaped nearly hairless body, protected by a thick layer of blubber, and forelimbs and tail modified to provide propulsion underwater.

- Suborder: Mysticeti
  - Family: Balaenidae
    - Bowhead whale, B. mysticetus (Note: Burt & Grossenheider 1976 (Peterson Field Guide) - only general range description.) (Alaska only) LC (Bering-Chukchi-Beaufort Sea subpopulation: LR/cd)
    - North Atlantic right whale, E. glacialis CR E
    - North Pacific right whale, E. japonica (Alaska only) EN E
      (Northeast Pacific subpopulation: CR)
  - Family: Balaenopteridae
    - Common minke whale, B. acutorostrata LC
    - Sei whale, B. borealis EN E
    - Eden's whale, B. edeni
      - Bryde's whale, B. brydei LC
    - Rice's whale, B. ricei CR E
    - Blue whale, B. musculus EN E (B. m. musculus North Pacific stock: LR/cd)
    - Fin whale, B. physalus VU E
    - Humpback whale, M. novaeangliae LC E
    - Gray whale, E. robustus LC E
- Suborder: Odontoceti
  - Superfamily: Platanistoidea
    - Family: Monodontidae
      - Beluga, D. leucas LC E (Cook Inlet subpopulation: CR)
      - Narwhal, M. monoceros (Alaska only) LC
    - Family: Phocoenidae
      - Harbour porpoise, P. phocoena LC
      - Dall's porpoise, P. dalli LC
    - Family: Physeteridae
      - Sperm whale, P. macrocephalus VU E
    - Family: Kogiidae
      - Pygmy sperm whale, K. breviceps LC
      - Dwarf sperm whale, K. sima (Hawaii only) LC
    - Family: Ziphiidae
      - Subfamily: Ziphiinae
        - Cuvier's beaked whale, Z. cavirostris LC
      - Subfamily: Berardiinae
        - Baird's beaked whale, B. bairdii LC
      - Subfamily: Hyperoodontinae
        - Northern bottlenose whale, H. ampullatus NT
        - Tropical bottlenose whale, I. pacificus (Hawaii Islands only) LC
        - Sowerby's beaked whale, M. bidens LC
        - Hubbs' beaked whale, M. carlhubbsi DD
        - Blainville's beaked whale, M. densirostris LC
        - Gervais' beaked whale, M. europaeus LC
        - Ginkgo-toothed beaked whale, M. ginkgodens DD
        - Hector's beaked whale, M. hectori (Note: Kays & Wilson 2002, IUCN Red List.) (A) DD
        - True's beaked whale, M. mirus LC
        - Perrin's beaked whale, M. perrini EN
        - Pygmy beaked whale, M. peruvianus (Note: pygmy beaked whale: Kays & Wilson 2002: one record in North America, Division of Mammals Collections NMNH SI: two strandings in California (2001 and 2012).) (A) LC
        - Stejneger's beaked whale, M. stejnegeri NT
    - Family: Delphinidae (marine dolphins)
      - Short-beaked common dolphin, D. delphis LC
        - Long-beaked common dolphin, D. capensis DD
      - Pygmy killer whale, F. attenuata LC
      - Short-finned pilot whale, G. macrorhynchus LC
      - Long-finned pilot whale, G. melas LC
      - Risso's dolphin, G. griseus LC
      - Fraser's dolphin, L. hosei LC
      - Atlantic white-sided dolphin, L. acutus LC
      - White-beaked dolphin, L. albirostris LC
      - Northern right whale dolphin, L. borealis LC
      - Killer whale, O. orca DD E
      - Melon-headed whale, P. electra LC
      - False killer whale, P. crassidens NT
      - Pantropical spotted dolphin, S. attenuata LC
      - Clymene dolphin, S. clymene LC
      - Striped dolphin, S. coeruleoalba LC
      - Atlantic spotted dolphin, S. frontalis LC
      - Spinner dolphin, S. longirostris LC
      - Rough-toothed dolphin, S. bredanensis LC
      - Pacific white-sided dolphin, S. obliquidens LC
      - Common bottlenose dolphin, T. truncatus LC

== Introduced species ==
- Family: Echimyidae (Echimyinae, Myocastorini)
  - Coypu, M. coypus (Note: Burt & Grossenheider 1976 (Peterson Field Guide), Kays & Wilson 2002, IUCN Red List.) (I) LC
- Family: Sciuridae (squirrels)
  - Mexican gray squirrel, S. aureogaster (I) LC
- Family: Muridae (mice, rats, voles, gerbils, hamsters, etc.)
  - Subfamily: Murinae
    - House mouse, M. musculus (Note: House Mouse: Burt & Grossenheider 1976 (Peterson Field Guide), Kays & Wilson 2002, IUCN Red List. Mammal Species of the World (MSW3) - only general range description.) (I) LC
    - Polynesian rat, R. exulans (Note: Polynesian rat) (I) (Hawaiian islands only) LC
    - Brown rat, R. norvegicus (I) LC
    - Roof rat, R. rattus (I) LC
- Family: Leporidae (rabbits, hares)
  - Cape hare, L. capensis (I) LC
  - European hare, L. europaeus (I) LC
  - European rabbit, O. cuniculus (Note: European Rabbit: & Wilson 2002 - range not clear (islands on Pacific Coast). Introduced to Hawaiian islands.) (I) EN
- Family: Cebidae (capuchin and squirrel monkeys)
  - Common squirrel monkey, S. sciureus (I) LC
- Family: Cercopithecidae (Old World monkeys)
  - Vervet monkey, C. pygerythrus (I) LC
  - Green monkey, C. sabaeus (I) LC
  - Japanese macaque, M. fuscata (I) LC T
  - Rhesus monkey, M. mulatta (I) LC
- Family: Herpestidae (mongoose)
  - Small Indian mongoose U. auropunctata (I) (Hawaii only) LC
- Family: Mustelidae (mustelids)
  - Beech marten, M. foina (I) LC
- Family: Suidae (pigs)
  - Wild boar, S. scrofa (Note: Sus scrofa: Burt & Grossenheider 1976 (Peterson Field Guide) - Wild Boar (Swine), Kays & Wilson 2002 - Wild Boar, Mammal Species of the World (MSW3) - Wild boar - feral populations, IUCN Red List - Wild boar - introduced (USA), Baker et al. 2003 (North America north of Mexico) - feral pig or wild boar.) (I) LC
- Family: Cervidae (deer)
  - Chital, A. axis (Note: Kays & Wilson 2002, Mammal Species of the World (MSW3), IUCN Red List.) (Note: Chital - free-ranging.) (I) LC
  - Indian hog deer, A. porcinus (I) EN
  - Red deer, C. elaphus (Note: Red deer, elaphus division (not canadensis division) - introduced i.e. to USA.) (I) LC
  - Sika, C. nippon (I) LC
  - European fallow deer, D. dama (I) LC
  - Sambar, R. unicolor (Note: Sambar - free ranging.) (I) VU
- Family: Bovidae (cattle, antelope, sheep, goats)
  - Subfamily: Bovinae
    - Nilgai, B. tragocamelus (Note: Nilgai - semi-free-ranging/free-ranging.) (I) LC
    - Feral cattle, B. taurus (I)
  - Subfamily: Hippotraginae
    - Gemsbok, O. gazella (Note: Gemsbok - free ranging.) (I) LC
    - Scimitar-horned Oryx, O. dammah (I)
  - Subfamily: Caprinae
    - Barbary sheep, A. lervia (Note: Barbary Sheep - free ranging.) (I) VU
    - Bezoar ibex, C. a. aegagrus (Note: Bezoar ibex - free-ranging: Florida Mountains near Deming New Mexico.) (I) LC
    - Siberian ibex, C. sibirica (I) NT
    - Domestic goat, C. hircus (Hawaiian islands only) (I)
    - Himalayan tahr, H. jemlahicus (I) NT
  - Subfamily: Antilopinae
    - Blackbuck, A. cervicapra (Note: Blackbuck - free ranging.) (I) LC
- Family: Equidae
  - Wild horse, E. ferus (Ex) EN
    - Domestic horse, E. f. caballus (I)
    - Donkey, E. asinus (I)

== See also ==
- List of mammals of Canada
- List of mammals of North America
- List of threatened mammals of the United States
- List of chordate orders
- Lists of mammals by region
- Mammal classification

== Notes ==
- Species listed in Mammal Species of the World, 3rd edition (MSW3) as occurring in the USA, but omitted in this article: Pteronotus pristinus - possibly Florida.
