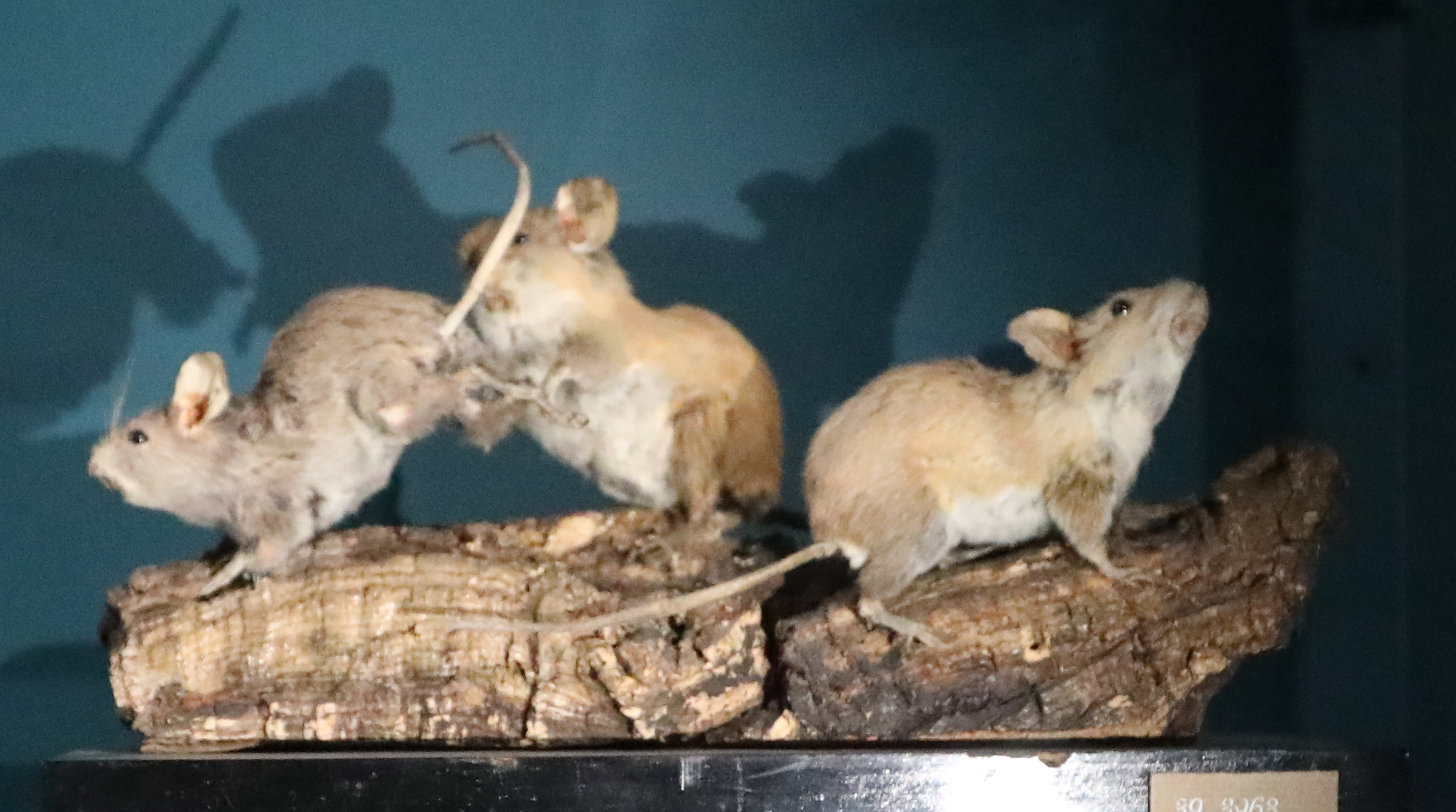
- A trio of taxidermied Peromyscus difficilis at the Natural History Museum at Tring

Conservation status
- Least Concern (IUCN 3.1)

Scientific classification
- Kingdom: Animalia
- Phylum: Chordata
- Class: Mammalia
- Order: Rodentia
- Family: Cricetidae
- Subfamily: Neotominae
- Genus: Peromyscus
- Species: P. difficilis

Binomial name
- Peromyscus difficilis (J.A. Allen, 1891)

= Zacatecan deer mouse =

Species of rodent

The Zacatecan deer mouse, Zacatecan deermouse, or southern rock mouse (Peromyscus difficilis) is a species of rodent in the family Cricetidae. It is a species of the genus Peromyscus, a closely related group of New World mice often called "deermice". It is found only in Mexico, and is not considered endangered.

== Description ==
Zacetecan deer mice are medium-sized mouse-like animals, weighing from 28 to 43 grams (0.99 to 1.52 oz), with long tails, large ears, and a slightly elongated snout. They have a combined head and body length of 9 to 12.5 centimetres (3.5 to 4.9 in), but the tail is always somewhat longer than the body, being from 9 to 14.5 centimetres (3.5 to 5.7 in) long. The female has six teats.

The upper part and flanks of the animal are typically ochraceous or buff, but in some subspecies may be brownish-red or have a heavy overlay of darker hairs that render the animal almost blackish in color. A clearly visible line runs along the flanks, while the underparts are generally paler, being whitish or pale grey. The area around the shoulders often bears a patch of fur with a slightly ochre or salmon color. There is also a narrow ring of darker fur around the eyes, emphasising their appearance. The tail has a similar color to the body, being buff or ochre above, and paler on the underside.

Zacetecan deer mice breed during the wetter parts of the year, from June to December. The female can produce up to three litters in a season with an average of three pups each. Females can reach sexual maturity within six months, so that some born in the early part of the breeding season may produce young of their own before the end of the year.

== Distribution and habitat ==
The Zacetecan deer mouse is found only in Mexico, where it inhabits the mountainous interior in and around the Sierra Madre Occidental and Sierra Madre Oriental. In the north it reaches as far as southern Chihuahua and Coahuila, and in the south, it can be found as far as northern Oaxaca.

It inhabits hilly terrain from 2,100 to 3,100 metres (6,900 to 10,200 ft) altitude. It generally prefers a semi-arid environment, such as chaparral or dry brush. As it alternative name of "southern rock mouse" implies, is often found in rocky or broken terrain, where the common vegetation tends to be grasses, acacia, and shrubs such as acahual. However, Zacatecan deer mice are also fairly common in montane forest dominated by juniper, oak, or pine, and, at the other extreme, have been found in rocky deserts with plentiful cacti.

== Ecology ==
Zacatecan deer mice are well adapted for climbing, although not truly arboreal, and maintain separate home ranges, especially during the breeding season. Population densities peak at around 13 individuals per hectare, but may be much lower at drier times of the year. They are omnivorous, feeding on small invertebrates and the seeds of grasses and other local vegetation. Their principle predators include skunks, snakes, owls, and ring-tailed cats.

== Classification ==
The Zacatecan deer mouse belongs to the truei species group within the genus Peromyscus. Genetic analysis has shown that its closest relative is the northern rock mouse, which is sufficiently similar to the Zacatecan deer mouse to have been considered the same species until 1978.

Five subspecies of the Zacatecan deer mouse are currently recognised:

- P. d. difficilis - Chihuahua, Sierra Madre Occidental, Guanajuato
- P. d. amplus - southern Hidalgo to northern Oaxaca
- P. d. felipensis - Valley of Mexico and Cerro San Felipe
- P. d. petricola - Sierra Madre Oriental
- P. d. saxicola - Querétaro and northern Hidalgo
