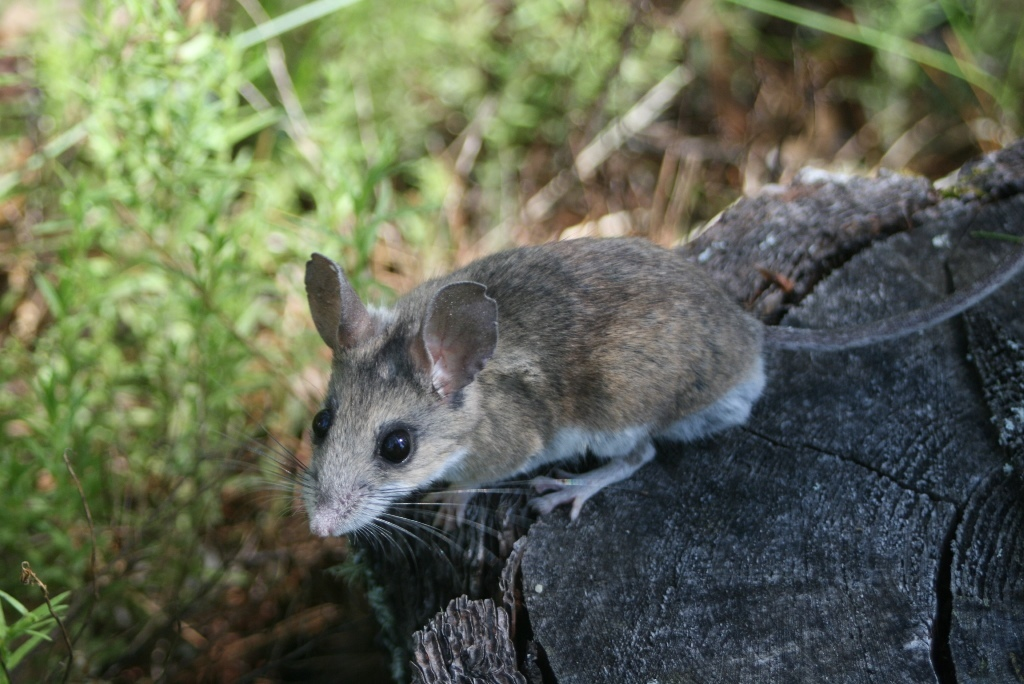

Conservation status
- Least Concern (IUCN 3.1)

- Secure (NatureServe)

Scientific classification
- Kingdom: Animalia
- Phylum: Chordata
- Class: Mammalia
- Order: Rodentia
- Family: Cricetidae
- Subfamily: Neotominae
- Genus: Peromyscus
- Species: P. nasutus

Binomial name
- Peromyscus nasutus (J.A. Allen, 1891)

= Northern rock mouse =

Species of rodent

The northern rock mouse (Peromyscus nasutus) is a species of rodent in the family Cricetidae. It is a species of the genus Peromyscus, a closely related group of New World mice often called "deermice". It is found in Mexico and the United States.
