= List of mammals of California =

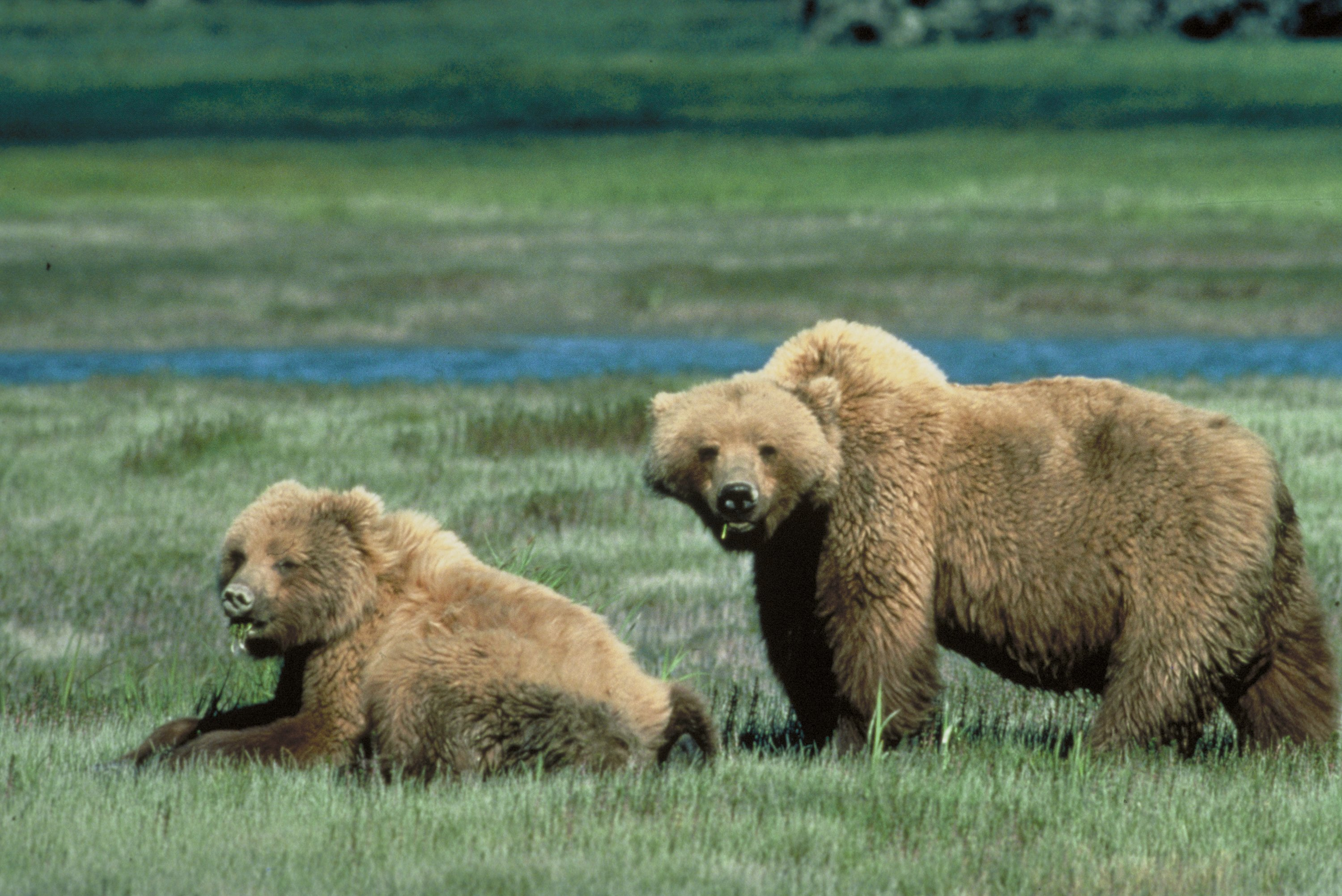
Though long extirpated from the state, the grizzly bear remains the official state mammal of California.

This is a list of mammals in California, including both current and recently historical inhabitants.

The California Department of Fish and Wildlife (CDFW) monitors certain species and subspecies of special concern. These are mammals whose populations may be locally threatened, but which are excluded from federal and international conservation lists. Taxa of special concern in California are noted below, as are endemic, introduced, harvest, and vagrant species.

There are 227 mammal species listed, including 186 terrestrial and 42 marine.

== Opossums ==
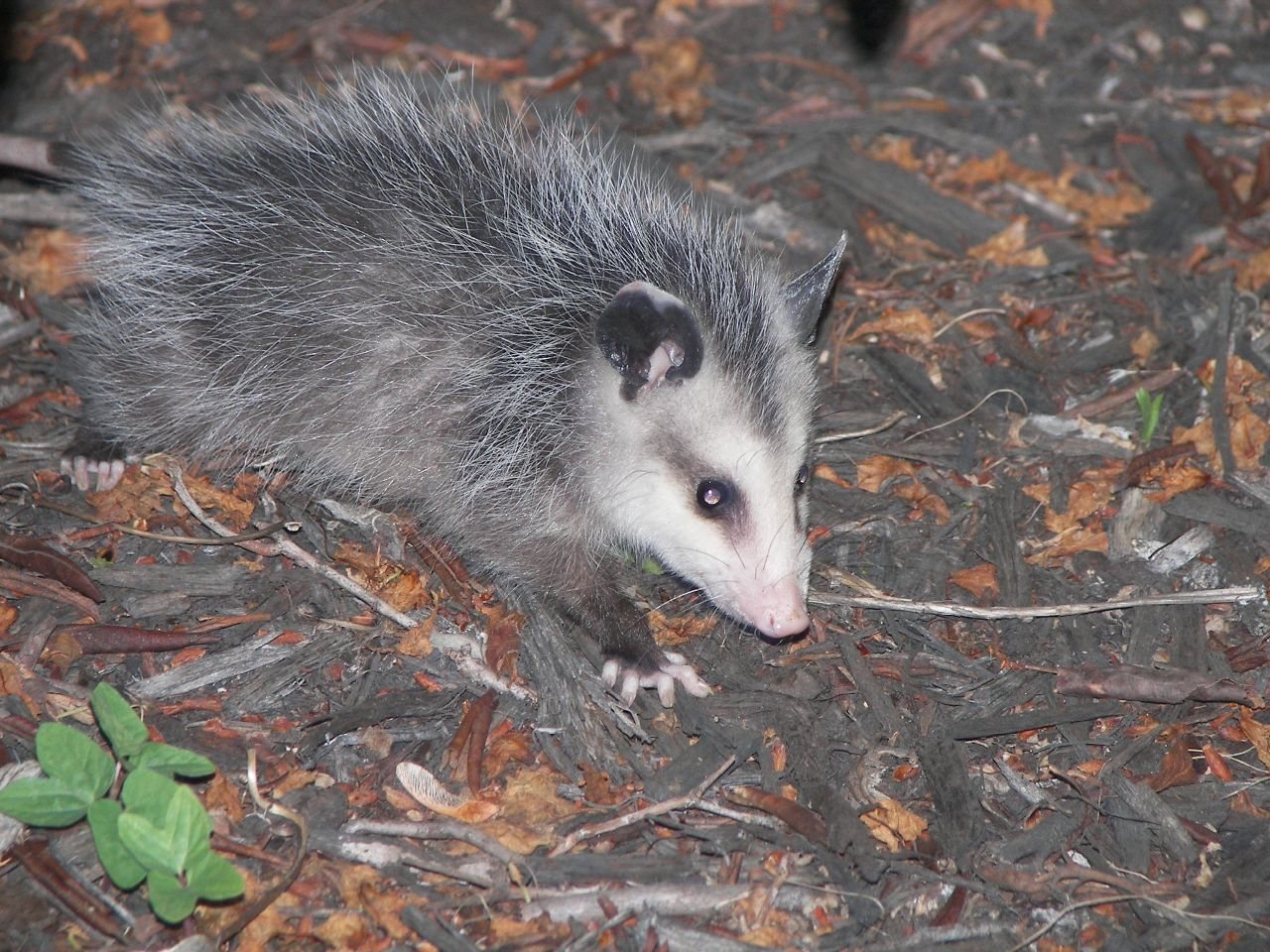
Opossum (Didelphis virginiana)

Order: Didelphimorphia, Family: Didelphidae

One species of opossum occurs in California.

Common name	Scientific name	Status	Distribution
Virginia opossum	Didelphis virginiana	Common, Introduced, Harvest	Statewide

== Eulipotyphlans ==
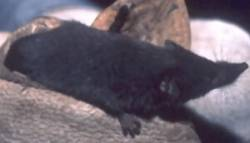
Desert shrew (Notiosorex crawfordi)

Order: Eulipotyphla, Family: Soricidae

Thirteen species of shrews occur in California.

Common name	Scientific name	Status	Distribution
Desert (or Crawford's gray) shrew	Notiosorex crawfordi		Southern deserts
Marsh shrew	Sorex bendirii		Northwest
Mount Lyell shrew	Sorex lyelli	Endemic, special concern	Central Sierra Nevada, high elevation
Merriam's shrew	Sorex merriami		Great Basin
Montane shrew	Sorex monticolus		Sierra Nevada and San Bernardino ranges
Pacific shrew	Sorex pacificus		Northwest
American water shrew	Sorex palustris		Sierra Nevada, Cascades, and Coast Ranges above 1,300 m (4,000 ft)
Preble's shrew	Sorex preblei		Cascades above 1,200 m (4,000 ft)
Ornate shrew	Sorex ornatus	5 ssp. of special concern	Central and southwest
Fog shrew	Sorex sonomae		Northwest
Inyo shrew	Sorex tenellus		East central
Trowbridge's shrew	Sorex trowbridgii		North outside Central Valley
Vagrant shrew	Sorex vagrans	1 ssp. of special concern	North outside Central Valley

Order: Eulipotyphla, Family: Talpidae

Five species of moles occur in California.

- Shrew-mole, Neurotrichus gibbsii
- Northern broad-footed mole, Scapanus latimanus
  - Alameda Island mole, S. l. parvus (CDFW special concern; endemic)
- Southern broad-footed mole (Scapanus occultus)
- Coast mole, Scapanus orarius
- Townsend's mole, Scapanus townsendii

== Bats ==
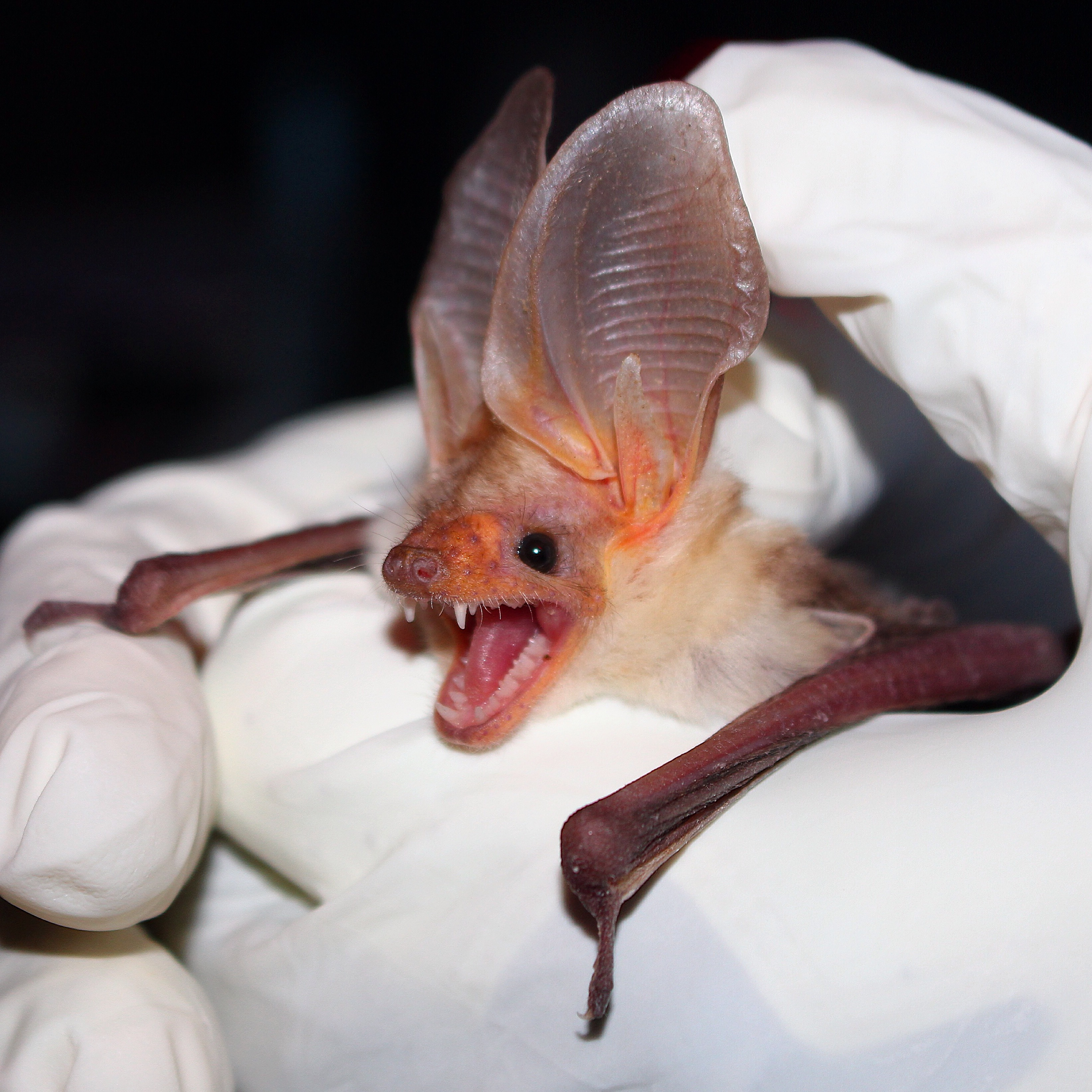
Pallid bat (Antrozous pallidus)

Order: Chiroptera, Family: Phyllostomidae

Four species of leaf-nosed bats occur in California.

- Mexican long-tongued bat, Choeronycteris mexicana (CDFW special concern)
- Southern long-nosed bat, Leptonycteris curasoae
- Lesser long-nosed bat, Leptonycteris yerbabuenae
- California leaf-nosed bat, Macrotus californicus (CDFW special concern)

Order: Chiroptera, Family: Vespertilionidae

Nineteen species of vesper bats occur in California.

- Hoary bat, Aeorestes cinereus
- Pallid bat, Antrozous pallidus (CDFW special concern)
- Townsend's big-eared bat, Corynorhinus townsendii
  - Pale big-eared bat, C. t. pallescens (CDFW special concern)
- Big brown bat, Eptesicus fuscus
- Spotted bat, Euderma maculatum (CDFW special concern)
- Allen's big-eared bat, Idionycteris phyllotis
- Silver-haired bat, Lasionycteris noctivagans
- Western red bat, Lasiurus blossevillii
- Western yellow bat, Lasiurus xanthinus
- California myotis, Myotis californicus
- Western small-footed myotis, Myotis ciliolabrum
- Long-eared myotis, Myotis evotis
- Little brown myotis, Myotis lucifugus
- Arizona myotis, Myotis occultus (CDFW special concern)
- Fringed myotis, Myotis thysanodes
- Cave myotis, Myotis velifer (CDFW special concern)
- Long-legged myotis, Myotis volans
- Yuma myotis, Myotis yumanensis
- Western pipistrelle, Parastrellus hesperus

Order: Chiroptera, Family: Molossidae

Four species of free-tailed bats occur in California.

- Western mastiff bat, Eumops perotis
  - California mastiff bat, E. p. californicus (CDFW special concern)
- Pocketed free-tailed bat, Nyctinomops femorosaccus (CDFW special concern)
- Big free-tailed bat, Nyctinomops macrotis (CDFW special concern)
- Brazilian (or Mexican) free-tailed bat, Tadarida brasiliensis

== Lagomorphs ==
Order: Lagomorpha Family: Ochotonidae

One species of pika occurs in California.

- American pika, Ochotona princeps

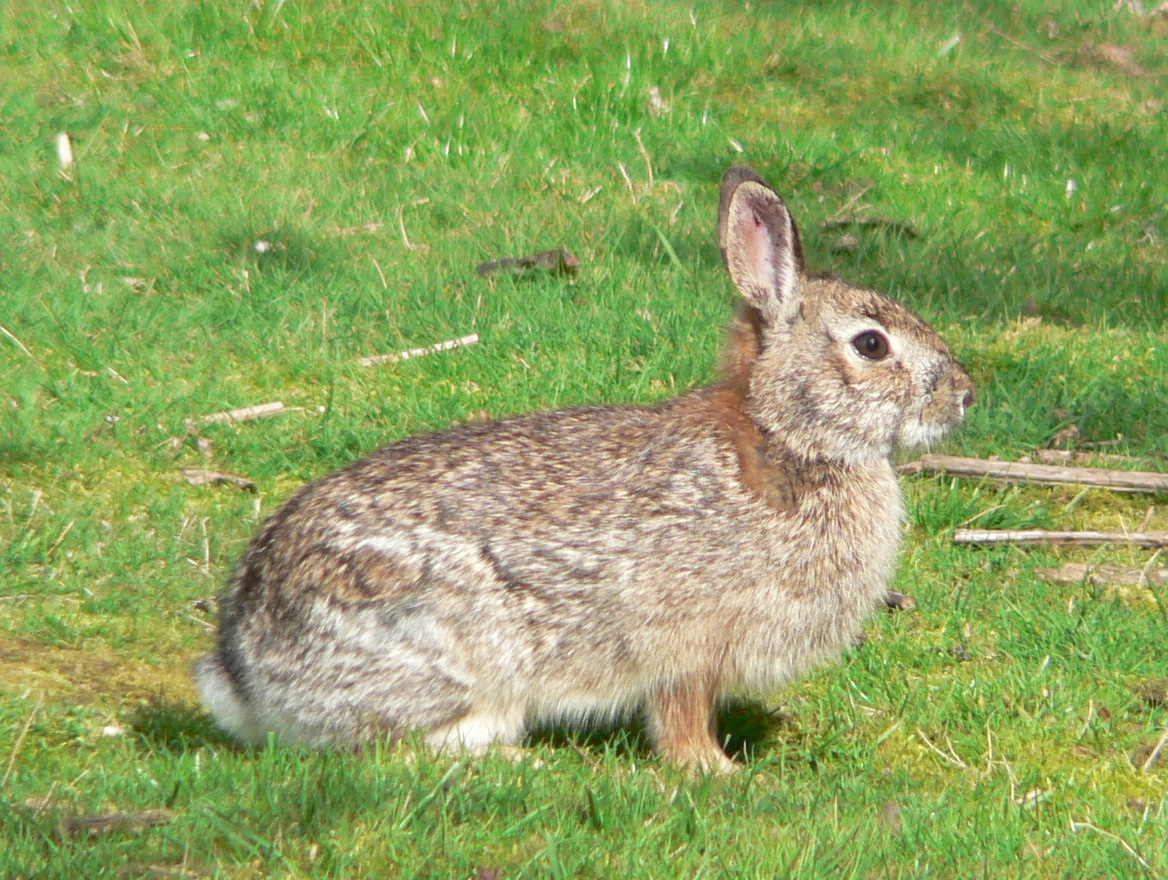
Brush rabbit (Sylvilagus bachmani)

Order: Lagomorpha Family: Leporidae

Eight species of rabbits and hares occur in California.

- Pygmy rabbit, Brachylagus idahoensis (CDFW special concern, harvest)
- Snowshoe hare, Lepus americanus (harvest)
  - Oregon snowshoe hare, L. a. klamathensis (CDFW special concern)
  - Sierra Nevada snowshoe hare, L. a. tahoensis (CDFW special concern; endemic)
- Black-tailed jackrabbit, Lepus californicus (harvest)
  - San Diego black-tailed jackrabbit, L. c. bennettii (CDFW special concern; endemic)
- White-tailed jackrabbit, Lepus townsendii (CDFW special concern, harvest)
- European rabbit, Oryctolagus cuniculus (introduced)
- Desert cottontail, Sylvilagus audubonii (harvest)
- Brush rabbit, Sylvilagus bachmani (harvest, except for endangered Riparian subspecies)
  - Riparian brush rabbit, S. b. riparius (CDFW special concern; endemic)
- Mountain cottontail, Sylvilagus nuttallii (harvest)

== Rodents ==
Order: Rodentia Family: Aplodontiidae

One species of mountain beaver occurs in California.

- Mountain beaver, Aplodontia rufa
  - Sierra Nevada mountain beaver, A. r. californica (CDFW special concern; endemic)
  - Point Arena mountain beaver, A. r. nigra (CDFW special concern; endemic)
  - Point Reyes mountain beaver, A. r. phaea (CDFW special concern; endemic)

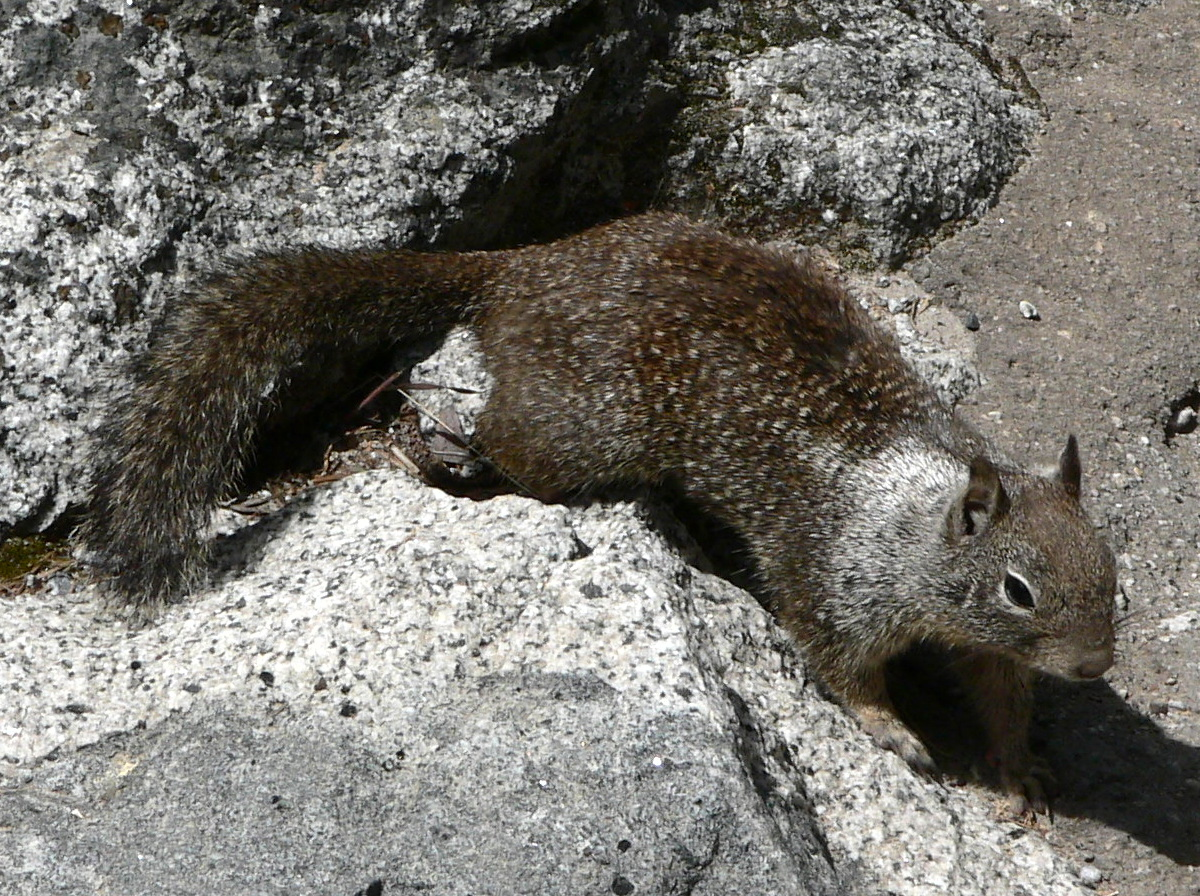
California ground squirrel (Spermophilus beecheyi)

Order: Rodentia Family: Sciuridae

Thirty species of squirrels, chipmunks, and marmots occur in California.

Subfamily Sciurinae (tree squirrels and flying squirrels)

- Humboldt's flying squirrel, Glaucomys oregonensis
  - San Bernardino flying squirrel, G. o. californicus (CDFW special concern; endemic)
- Northern flying squirrel, Glaucomys sabrinus (CDFW special concern)
- Eastern gray squirrel, Sciurus carolinensis (introduced, harvest)
- Western gray squirrel, Sciurus griseus (harvest)
- Eastern fox squirrel, Sciurus niger (introduced, harvest)
- Douglas' squirrel, Tamiasciurus douglasii (harvest)

Subfamily Xerinae (chipmunks and ground squirrels)

- White-tailed antelope ground squirrel, Ammospermophilus leucurus
- Nelson's antelope ground squirrel, Ammospermophilus nelsoni (endemic)
- Yellow-bellied marmot, Marmota flaviventris
- California ground squirrel, Spermophilus beecheyi
- Belding's ground squirrel, Spermophilus beldingi
- Golden-mantled ground squirrel, Spermophilus lateralis
- Mohave ground squirrel, Spermophilus mohavensis (endemic)
- Round-tailed ground squirrel, Spermophilus tereticaudus
  - Palm Springs round-tailed ground squirrel, S. t. chlorus (CDFW special concern; endemic)
- Townsend's ground squirrel, Spermophilus townsendii
- Rock squirrel, Spermophilus variegatus
- Alpine chipmunk, Tamias alpinus (endemic)
- Yellow-pine chipmunk, Tamias amoenus
- Merriam's chipmunk, Tamias merriami
- Least chipmunk, Tamias minimus
- California chipmunk, Tamias obscurus
- Yellow-cheeked chipmunk, Tamias ochrogenys (endemic)
- Panamint chipmunk, Tamias panamintinus
- Long-eared chipmunk, Tamias quadrimaculatus
- Allen's chipmunk, Tamias senex
- Siskiyou chipmunk, Tamias siskiyou
- Sonoma chipmunk, Tamias sonomae (endemic)
- Lodgepole chipmunk, Tamias speciosus
- Uinta chipmunk, Tamias umbrinus

Order: Rodentia Family: Castoridae

One species of beaver occurs in California.

- American beaver, Castor canadensis (harvest)

Order: Rodentia Family: Geomyidae

Five species of pocket gophers occur in California.

- Botta's pocket gopher, Thomomys bottae
- Western pocket gopher, Thomomys mazama
- Mountain pocket gopher, Thomomys monticola
- Northern pocket gopher, Thomomys talpoides
- Townsend's pocket gopher, Thomomys townsendii

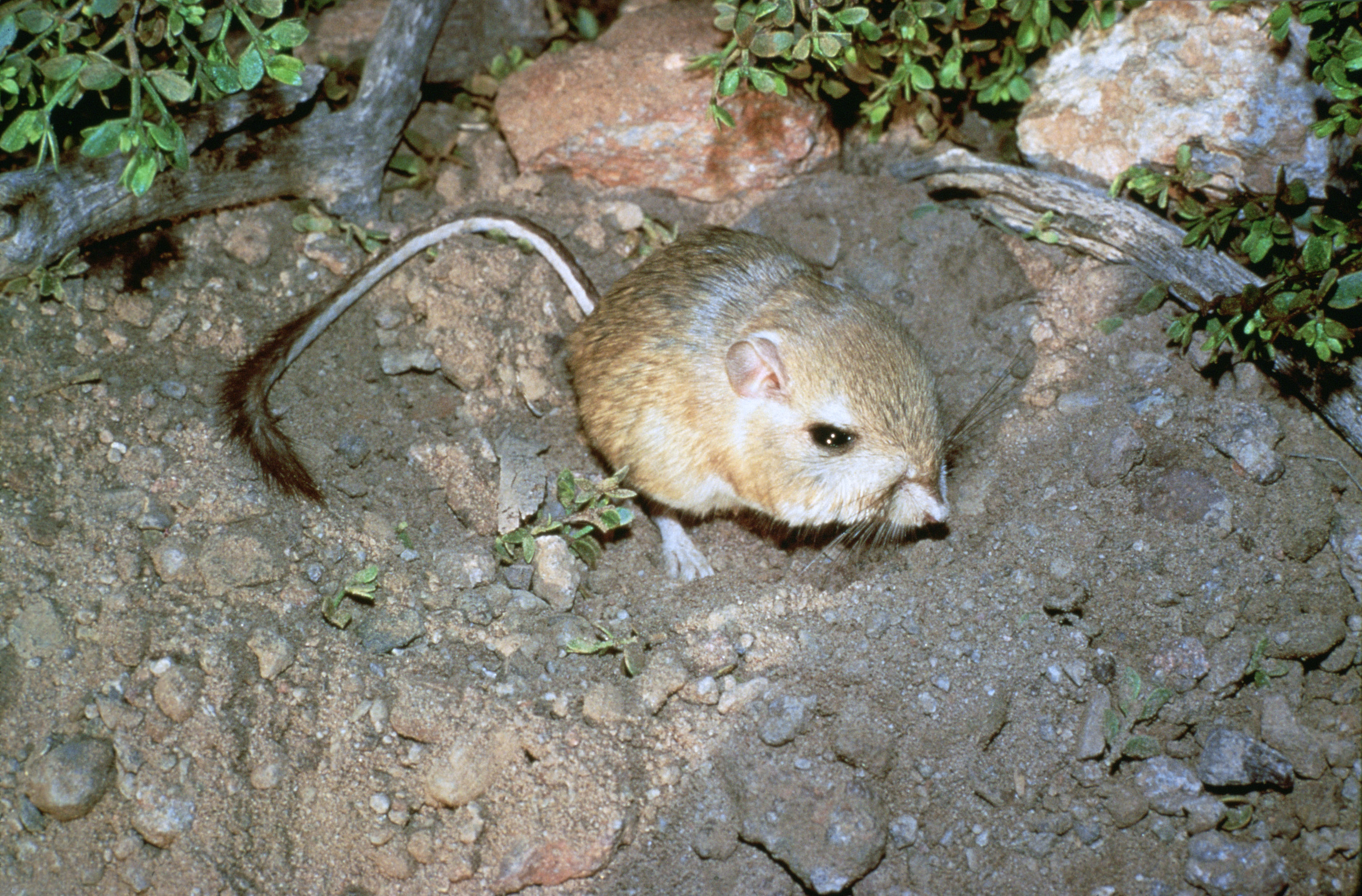
The giant kangaroo rat (Dipodomys ingens) is endemic to California

Order: Rodentia Family: Heteromyidae

Twenty-six species of pocket mice and kangaroo rats occur in California.

Subfamily Dipodomyinae (kangaroo rats and mice)

- Pacific (or agile) kangaroo rat, Dipodomys agilis (endemic)
- California kangaroo rat, Dipodomys californicus
  - Marysville California kangaroo rat, D. californicus eximus (CDFW special concern; endemic)
- Desert kangaroo rat, Dipodomys deserti
- Big-eared kangaroo rat, Dipodomys elephantinus (CDFW special concern; endemic)
- Heermann's kangaroo rat, Dipodomys heermanni (endemic)
- Giant kangaroo rat, Dipodomys ingens (endemic)
- Merriam's kangaroo rat, Dipodomys merriami
  - San Bernardino Merriam's kangaroo rat, D. merriami parvus (CDFW special concern; endemic)
- Chisel-toothed kangaroo rat, Dipodomys microps
- Fresno kangaroo rat, Dipodomys nitratoides (endemic)
  - Short-nosed kangaroo rat, D. n. brevinasus (CDFW special concern; endemic)
  - Tipton kangaroo rat, D. n. nitratoides (CDFW special concern; endemic)
- Ord's kangaroo rat, Dipodomys ordii
- Panamint kangaroo rat, Dipodomys panamintinus
- San Diego kangaroo rat, Dipodomys simulans
- Stephens' kangaroo rat, Dipodomys stephensi (endemic)
- Narrow-faced kangaroo rat, Dipodomys venustus (endemic)
- Dark kangaroo mouse, Microdipodops megacephalus
- Pale kangaroo mouse, Microdipodops pallidus

Subfamily Perognathinae (pocket mice)

- Bailey's pocket mouse, Chaetodipus baileyi
- California pocket mouse, Chaetodipus californicus
  - Dulzura pocket mouse, C. c. femoralis (CDFW special concern; endemic)
- San Diego pocket mouse, Chaetodipus fallax
  - Northwestern San Diego pocket mouse, C. f. fallax (CDFW special concern; endemic)
  - Pallid San Diego pocket mouse, C. f. pallidus (CDFW special concern; endemic)
- Long-tailed pocket mouse, Chaetodipus formosus
- Desert pocket mouse, Chaetodipus penicillatus
- Spiny pocket mouse, Chaetodipus spinatus
- White-eared pocket mouse, Perognathus alticola (endemic)
  - White-eared pocket mouse, P. a. alticola (CDFW special concern; endemic)
  - Tehachapi pocket mouse, P. a. inexpectatus (CDFW special concern; endemic)
- San Joaquin pocket mouse, Perognathus inornatus (endemic)
  - Salinas pocket mouse, P. i. psammophilus (CDFW special concern; endemic)
- Little pocket mouse, Perognathus longimembris
  - Palm Springs pocket mouse, P. l. bangsi (CDFW special concern; endemic)
  - Los Angeles pocket mouse, P. l. brevinasus (CDFW special concern; endemic)
  - Jacumba pocket mouse, P. l. internationalis (CDFW special concern; endemic)
  - Pacific pocket mouse, P. l. pacificus (CDFW special concern; endemic)
- Great Basin pocket mouse, Perognathus parvus

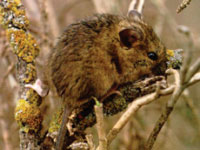
The salt marsh harvest mouse (Reithrodontomys raviventris) is endemic to California

Order: Rodentia Family: Cricetidae

Twenty-nine species of voles and New World rats and mice occur in California.

Subfamily Arvicolinae (lemmings, voles, and muskrat)

- White-footed vole, Arborimus albipes (CDFW special concern)
- Red tree vole, Arborimus longicaudus presence uncertain
- Sonoma tree vole, Arborimus pomo (CDFW special concern; endemic)
- Western red-backed vole, Clethrionomys californicus
- Sagebrush vole, Lemmiscus curtatus
- California vole, Microtus californicus
  - Monterey vole, M. c. halophilus (endemic)
  - Mojave River vole, M. c. mohavensis (CDFW special concern; endemic)
  - San Pablo vole, M. c. sanpabloensis (CDFW special concern; endemic)
  - Amargosa vole, M. c. scirpensis (federal and state endangered; endemic)
  - South coast marsh vole, M. c. stephensi (CDFW special concern; endemic)
  - Owens Valley vole, M. c. vallicola (CDFW special concern; endemic)
- Long-tailed vole, Microtus longicaudus
- Montane vole, Microtus montanus
- Creeping vole, Microtus oregoni
- Townsend's vole, Microtus townsendii
- Muskrat, Ondatra zibethicus (introduced, harvest)
- Heather vole, Phenacomys intermedius

Subfamily Neotominae (North American rats and mice)

- White-throated woodrat, Neotoma albigula
- Bushy-tailed woodrat, Neotoma cinerea
- Dusky-footed woodrat, Neotoma fuscipes
- Desert woodrat, Neotoma lepida
- Large-eared woodrat, Neotoma macrotis
- Northern grasshopper mouse, Onychomys leucogaster
- Southern grasshopper mouse, Onychomys torridus
- Brush mouse, Peromyscus boylii
- California mouse, Peromyscus californicus
- Canyon mouse, Peromyscus crinitus
- Cactus mouse, Peromyscus eremicus
- Northern Baja deer mouse, Peromyscus fraterculus
- Gambel's deer mouse, Peromyscus gambelii
- Western deer mouse, Peromyscus sonoriensis
- Pinyon mouse, Peromyscus truei
- Salt marsh harvest mouse, Reithrodontomys raviventris (endemic)
- Western harvest mouse, Reithrodontomys megalotis

Subfamily Sigmodontinae (cotton rats)

- Arizona cotton rat, Sigmodon arizonae
- Hispid cotton rat, Sigmodon hispidus

Order: Rodentia Family: Muridae

Three species of Old World rats and mice occur in California.

- House mouse, Mus musculus (introduced)
- Norway rat, Rattus norvegicus (introduced)
- Black rat, Rattus rattus (introduced)

Order: Rodentia Family: Dipodidae

Two species of jumping mice occur in California.

- Western jumping mouse, Zapus princeps
- Pacific jumping mouse, Zapus trinotatus

Order: Rodentia Family: Erethizontidae

One species of porcupine occurs in California.

- North American porcupine, Erethizon dorsatum

== Whales, dolphins and porpoises ==
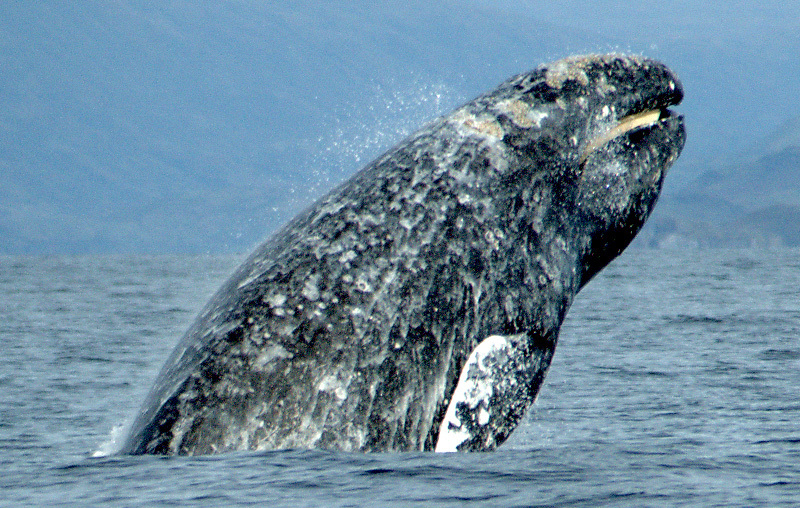
The gray whale (Eschrichtius robustus) migrates off the coast of California

Order: Cetacea Family: Eschrichtiidae

One species of gray whale occurs in California's waters.

- Gray whale, Eschrichtius robustus (migrant)

Order: Cetacea Family: Balaenopteridae

Six species of rorquals occur in California's waters.

- Minke whale, Balaenoptera acutorostrata
- Bryde's whale, Balaenoptera brydei (vagrant)
- Sei whale, Balaenoptera borealis
- Blue whale, Balaenoptera musculus
- Fin whale, Balaenoptera physalus
- Humpback whale, Megaptera novaeangliae

Order: Cetacea Family: Balaenidae

One species of right whale occurs in California's waters.

- North Pacific right whale, Eubalaena japonica (vagrant)

Order: Cetacea Family: Delphinidae

Twelve species of dolphins occur in California's waters.

- Short-beaked common dolphin, Delphinus delphis
- Long-beaked common dolphin, Delphinus capensis
- Short-finned pilot whale, Globicephala macrorhynchus
- Risso's dolphin, Grampus griseus
- Northern right whale dolphin, Lissodelphis borealis
- Killer whale, Orcinus orca
- False killer whale, Pseudorca crassidens (vagrant)
- Pacific white-sided dolphin, Sagmatias obliquidens
- Pantropical spotted dolphin, Stenella attenuata (vagrant)
- Striped dolphin, Stenella coeruleoalba
- Rough-toothed dolphin, Steno bredanensis (vagrant)
- Common bottlenose dolphin, Tursiops truncatus

Order: Cetacea Family: Phocoenidae

Two species of porpoises occur in California's waters.

- Harbor porpoise, Phocoena phocoena
- Dall's porpoise, Phocoenoides dalli

Order: Cetacea Family: Kogiidae

Two species of small sperm whales occur in California's waters.

- Pygmy sperm whale, Kogia breviceps
- Dwarf sperm whale, Kogia sima

Order: Cetacea Family: Physeteridae

One species of sperm whale occur in California's waters.

- Sperm whale, Physeter macrocephalus

Order: Cetacea Family: Ziphiidae

Seven species of beaked whales occur in California's waters.

- Baird's beaked whale, Berardius bairdii
- Hubbs' beaked whale, Mesoplodon carlhubbsi
- Blainville's beaked whale, Mesoplodon densirostris
- Ginkgo-toothed beaked whale, Mesoplodon ginkgodens
- Perrin's beaked whale, Mesoplodon perrini
- Stejneger's beaked whale, Mesoplodon stejnegeri
- Cuvier's beaked whale, Ziphius cavirostris

== Carnivorans ==
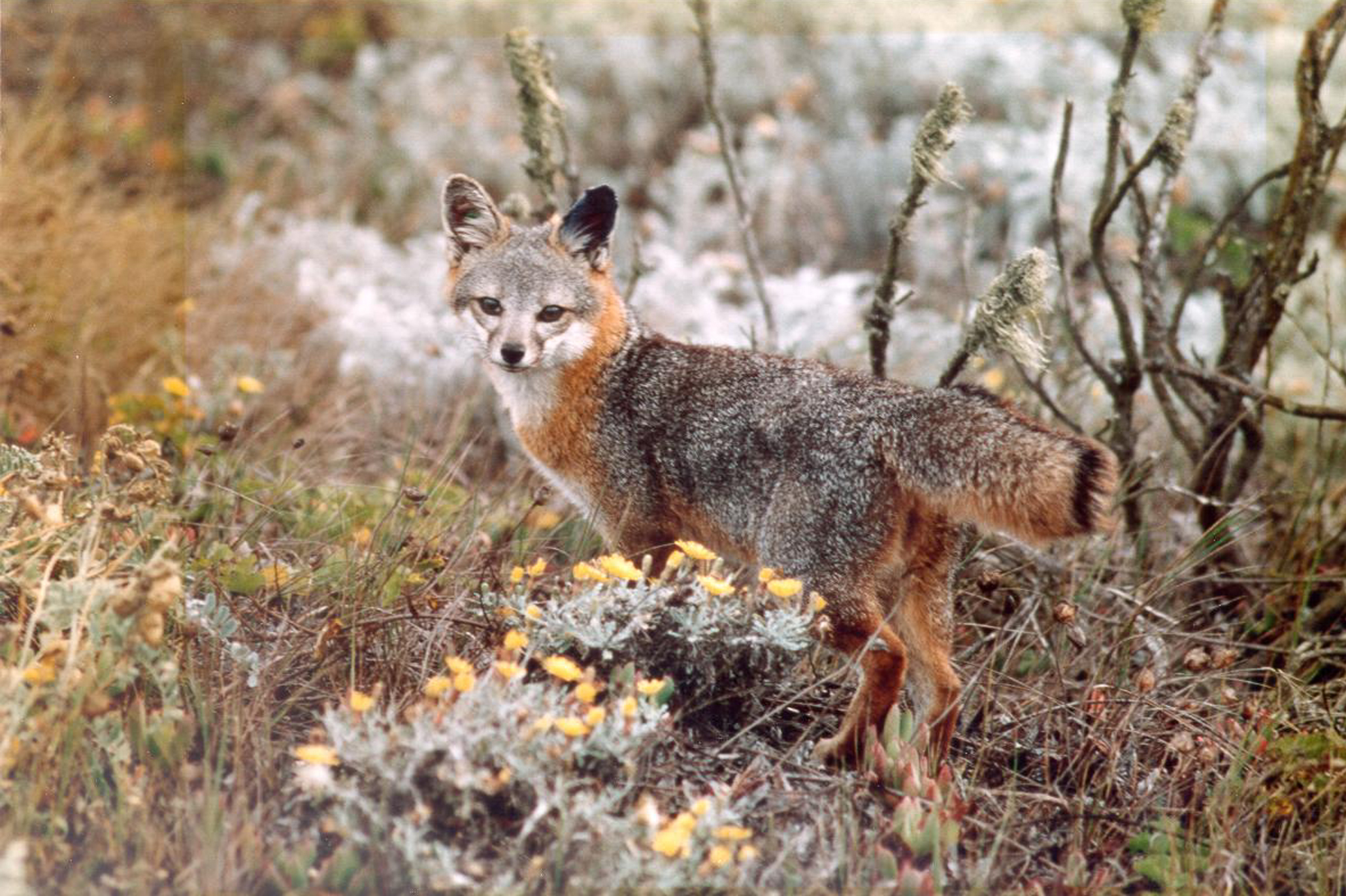
The island fox (Urocyon littoralis) is endemic to California.

Order: Carnivora Family: Canidae

Six species of canids occur in California.

- Coyote, Canis latrans
- Gray wolf, Canis lupus (extirpated 1924, resettled 2017)
  - Cascade Mountains wolf, C. l. fuscus (extirpated 1920s)
  - Mexican wolf, C. l. baileyi (extirpated 20th century)
  - Northwestern wolf, C. l. occidentalis
- Gray fox, Urocyon cinereoargenteus (harvest)
- Island fox, Urocyon littoralis (endemic)
- Kit fox, Vulpes macrotis
- Red fox, Vulpes vulpes

Order: Carnivora Family: Ursidae

Two species of bears occurred in California. One was recently extirpated.

- Black bear, Ursus americanus (harvest)
- Brown bear, Ursus arctos (extirpated 1924)
  - †California grizzly bear, U. a. californicus (extinct)

Order: Carnivora Family: Procyonidae

Two species of this nocturnal, omnivorous family occur in California.

- Ring-tailed cat, Bassariscus astutus
- Raccoon, Procyon lotor (harvest)

Order: Carnivora Family: Mephitidae

Two species of skunks occur in California.

- Striped skunk, Mephitis mephitis (harvest)
- Western spotted skunk, Spilogale gracilis (harvest)
  - Channel Islands spotted skunk, S. g. amphiala (CDFW special concern; endemic)

Order: Carnivora Family: Felidae

Four species of cats occurred in California. One was recently extirpated.

- Canada lynx, Lynx canadensis (vagrant)
- Bobcat, Lynx rufus (harvest)
- Jaguar, Panthera onca (extirpated 1826)
- Cougar, Puma concolor

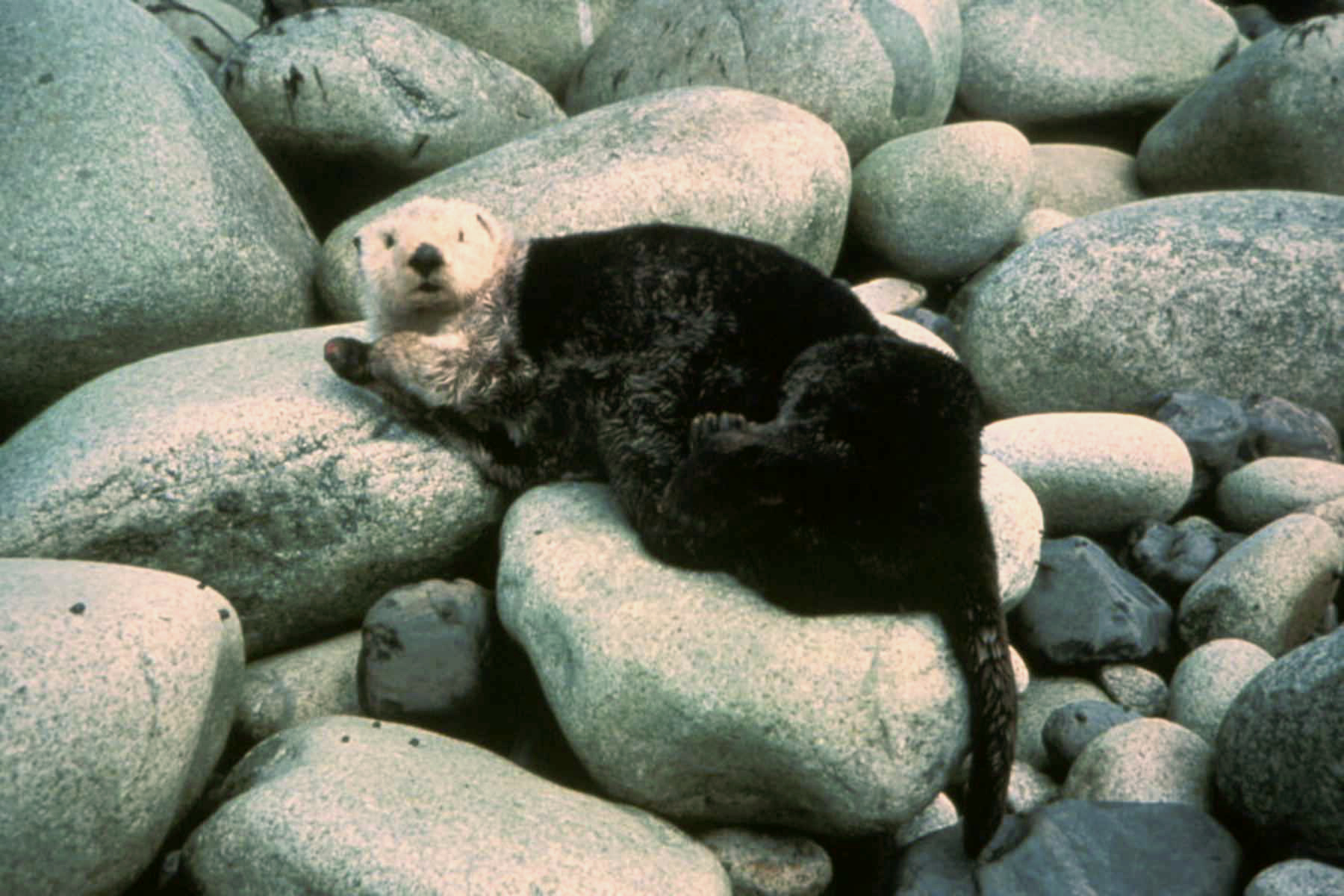
Sea otter (Enhydra lutris)

Order: Carnivora Family: Mustelidae

- Sea otter, Enhydra lutris
- Wolverine, Gulo gulo (vagrant)
- North American river otter, Lontra canadensis
- Pacific marten, Martes caurina
  - Humboldt marten, M. c. humboldtensis (CDFW special concern)
- American ermine, Mustela richardsonii
- Long-tailed weasel, Neogale frenata
- American mink, Neogale vison
- Fisher, Pekania pennanti
- American badger, Taxidea taxus

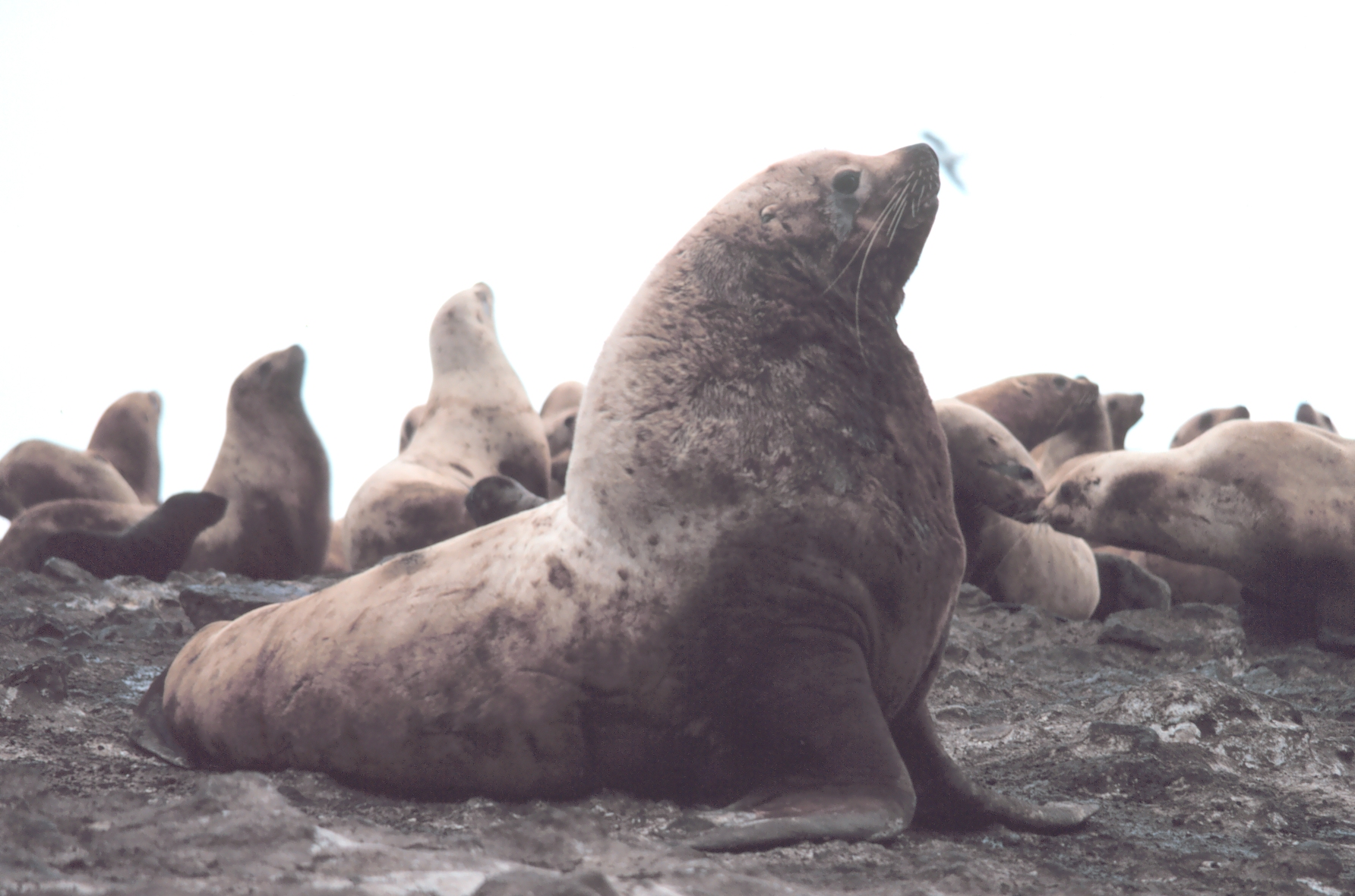
Steller sea lion (Eumetopias jubatus)

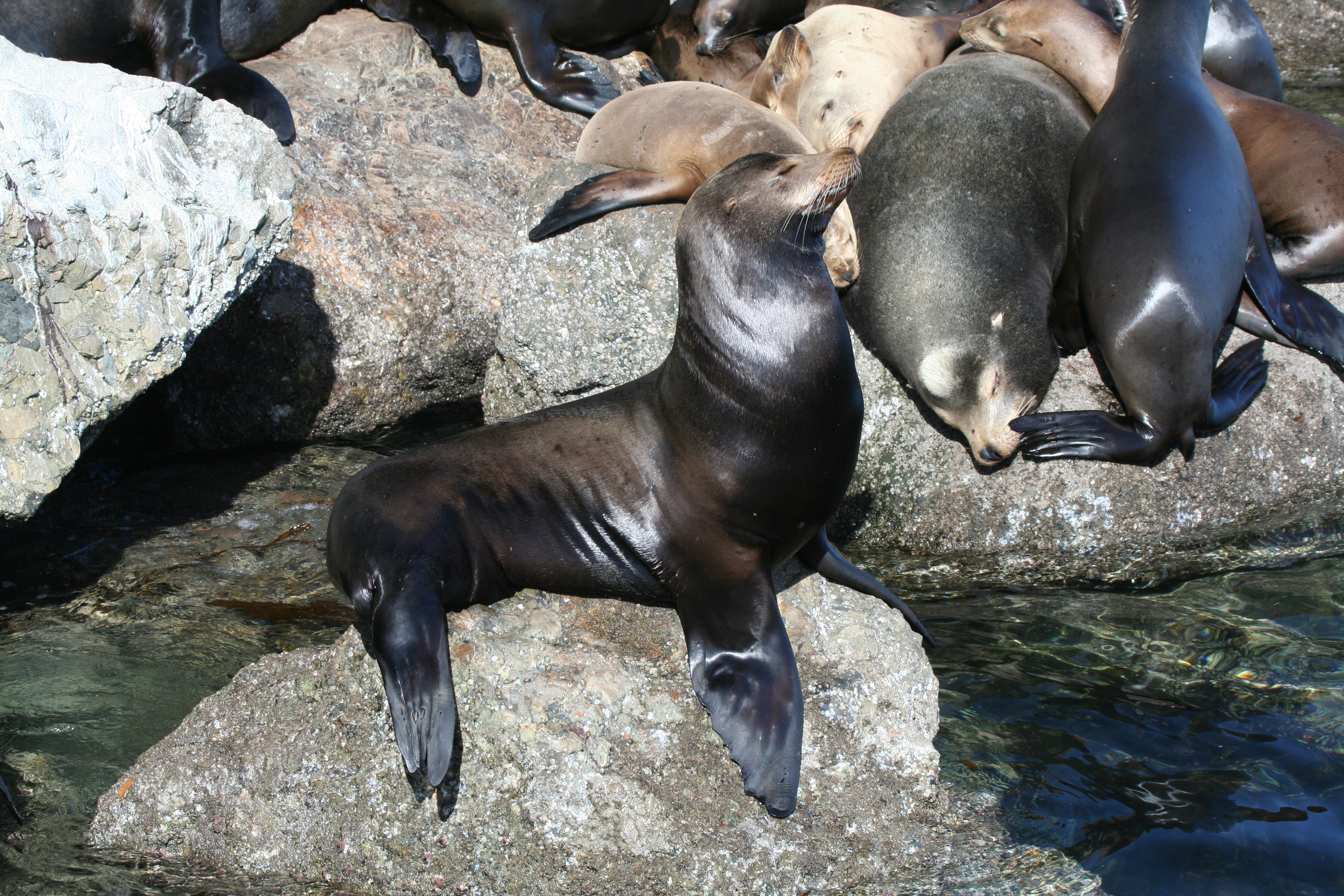
California sea lion (Zalophus californianus)

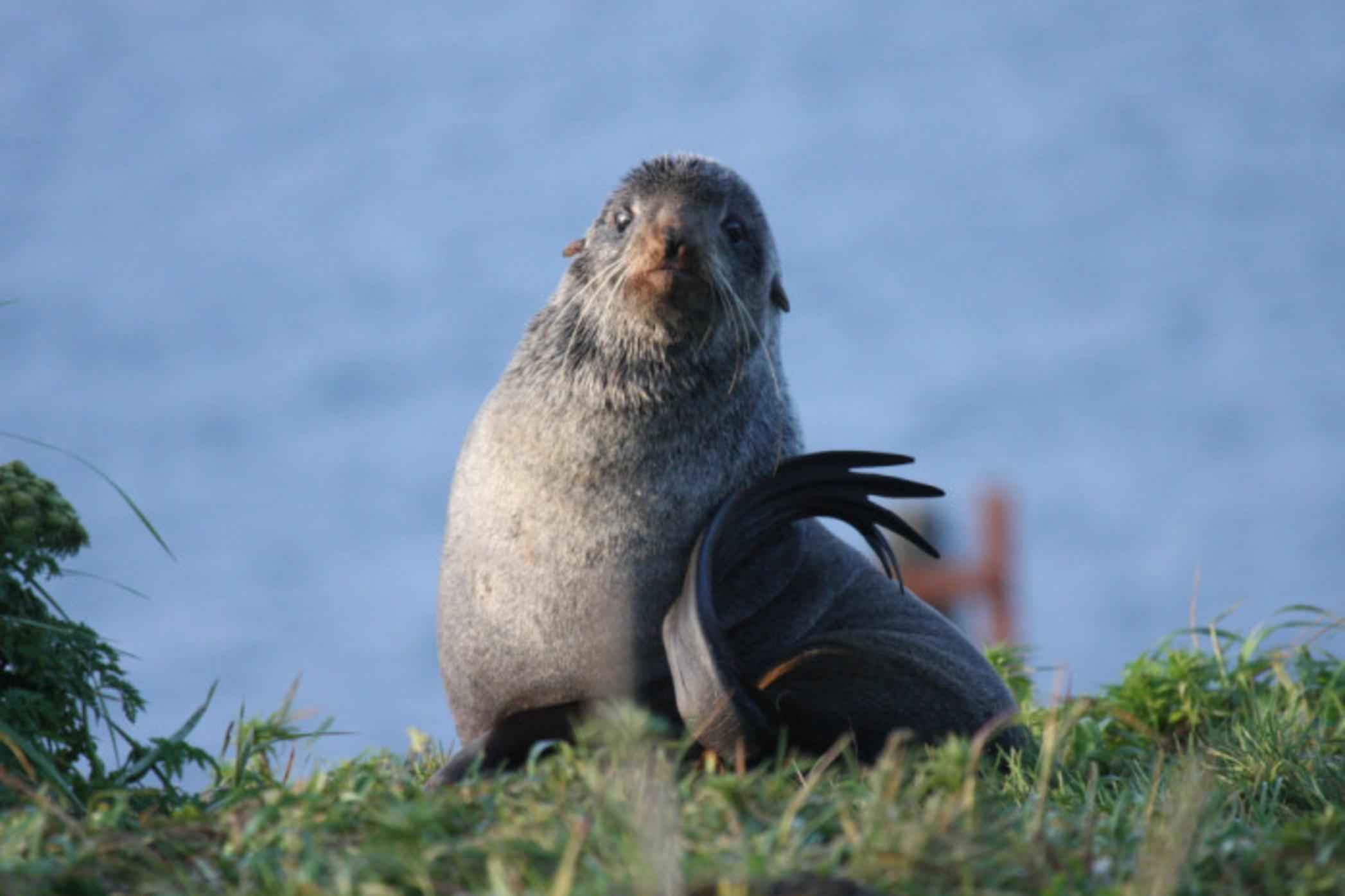
Northern fur seal (Callorhinus ursinus)

Order: Carnivora Family: Otariidae

Four species of eared seals occur in California.

- Guadalupe fur seal, Arctophoca townsendi
- Northern fur seal, Callorhinus ursinus
- Northern (Steller) sea lion, Eumetopias jubatus
- California sea lion, Zalophus californianus

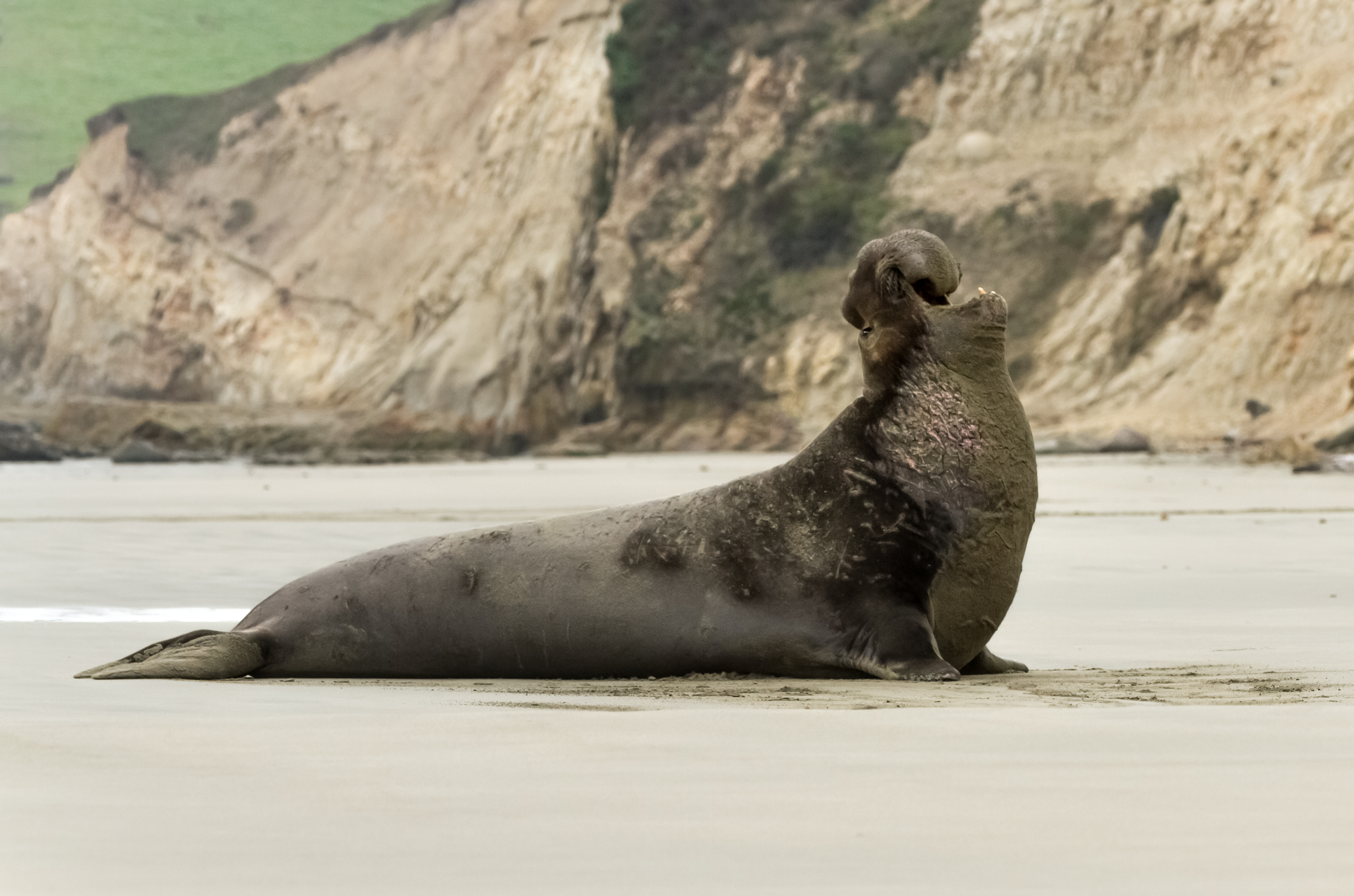
Northern elephant seal (Mirounga angustirostris)

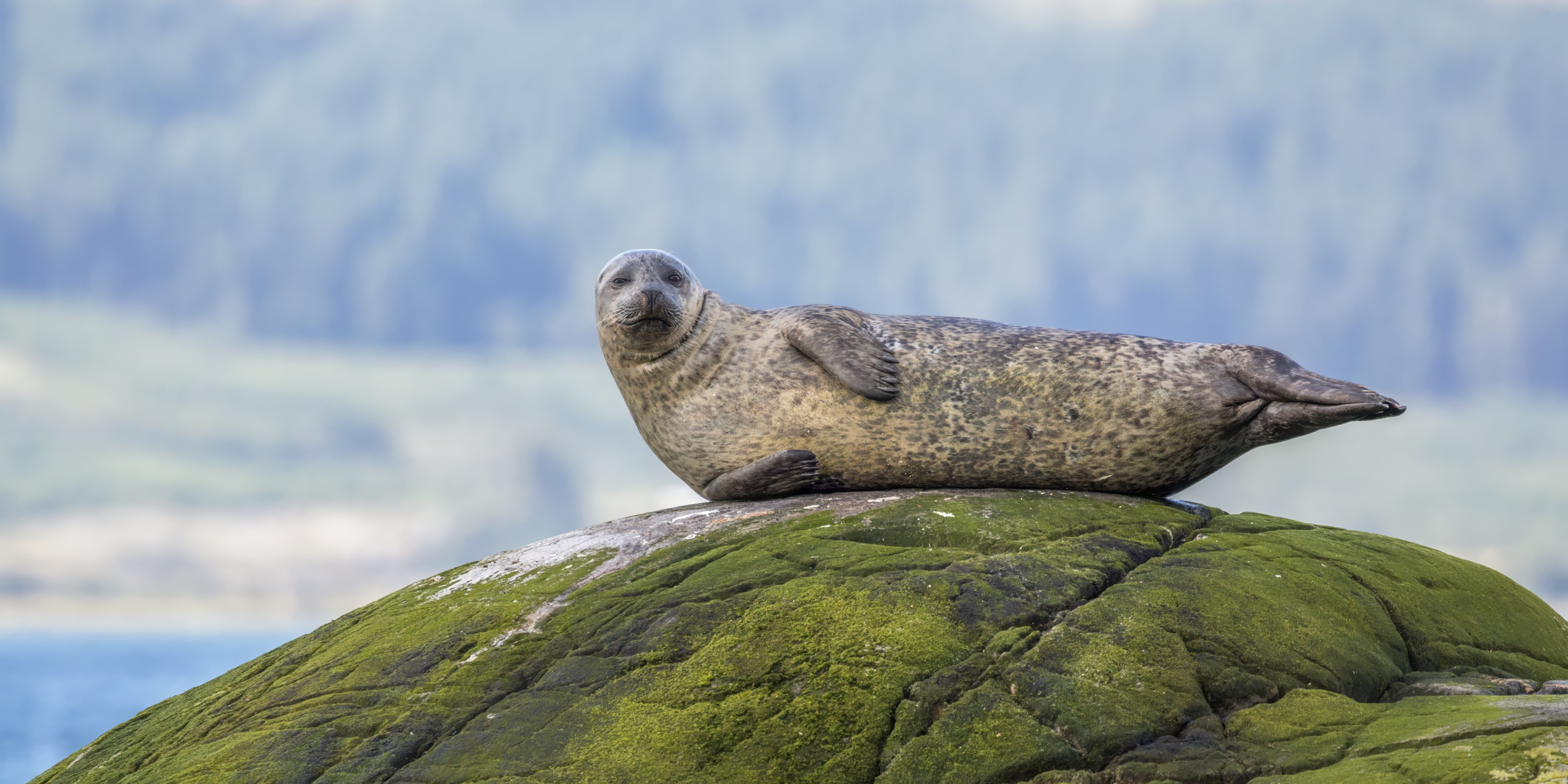
Harbor seal (Phoca vitulina)

Order: Carnivora Family: Phocidae

Four species of earless seals occur in California.

- Northern elephant seal, Mirounga angustirostris
- Ribbon seal, Phoca fasciata (vagrant)
- Harbor seal, Phoca vitulina
- Ringed seal, Phoca hispida (vagrant)

== Even-toed ungulates ==
Order: Artiodactyla Family: Antilocapridae

One species of pronghorn occurs in California.

- Pronghorn, Antilocapra americana (harvest)

Order: Artiodactyla Family: Bovidae

Three species of bovid occur in California; one is introduced.

- Barbary sheep, Ammotragus lervia (introduced, harvest)
- American bison, Bison bison (extirpated early 1800s, introduced on Santa Catalina Island)
- Bighorn sheep, Ovis canadensis (harvest)
  - Desert bighorn sheep, O. c. nelsoni
  - Sierra Nevada bighorn sheep, O. c. sierrae

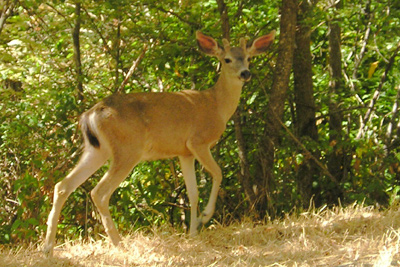
Mule deer (Odocoileus hemionus)

Order: Artiodactyla Family: Cervidae

Four species of deer and elk occur in California.

- Elk, Cervus canadensis
  - Roosevelt elk, C. c. roosevelti
  - Tule elk, C. c. nannodes (endemic)
- European fallow deer, Dama dama (introduced, harvest)
- Mule deer, Odocoileus hemionus (harvest)
  - California mule deer, O. h. californicus
  - Columbian black-tailed deer, O. h. columbianus
  - Southern mule deer, O. h. fuliginatus
  - Inyo mule deer, O. h. inyoensis

Order: Artiodactyla Family: Suidae

One species of pig occurs in California.

- Wild boar, Sus scrofa (introduced, harvest)
