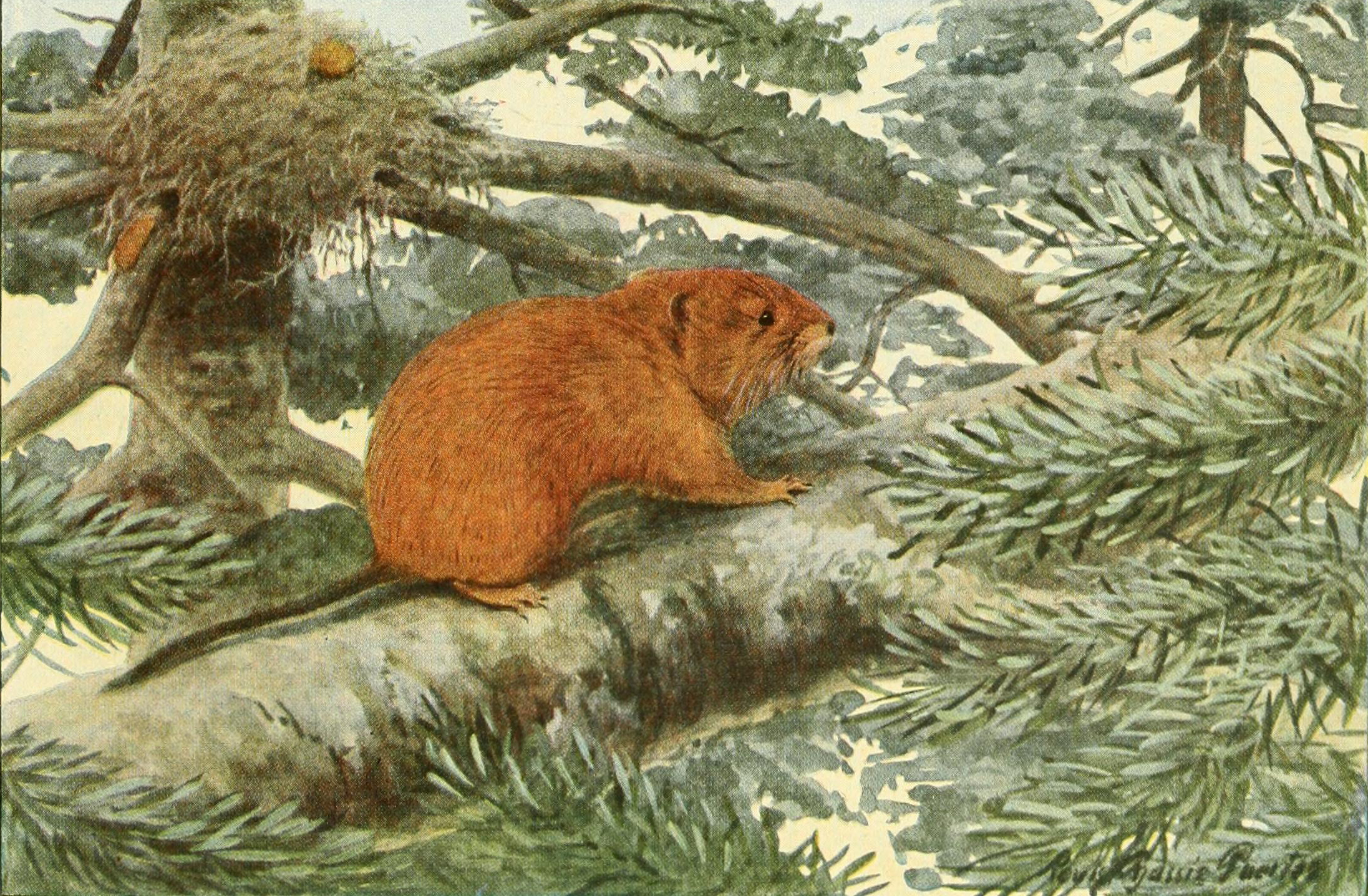
- Red tree vole (Arborimus longicaudus)

Scientific classification
- Kingdom: Animalia
- Phylum: Chordata
- Class: Mammalia
- Order: Rodentia
- Family: Cricetidae
- Subfamily: Arvicolinae
- Tribe: Phenacomyini; Zagorodniuk, 1990

Genera
- Arborimus; Phenacomys

= Phenacomyini =

Phenacomyini Temporal range: Early Pleistocene - present, 1.8–0 Ma

Tribe of rodents

Phenacomyini is a tribe of voles in the subfamily Arvicolinae. It contains five species in two genera, all of which are found in North America.

Species in this tribe are:

- Genus Arborimus - tree voles
  - White-footed vole, A. albipes
  - Red tree vole, A. longicaudus
  - Sonoma tree vole, A. pomo
- Genus Phenacomys - heather voles
  - Western heather vole, P. intermedius
  - Eastern heather vole, P. ungava

The fossil taxa Hibbardomys and Paraphenacomys likely also belong to this tribe.

The phylogenetic affinities of this tribe have been disputed; some authors have classified them as belonging in the same clade as Arvicolini and Myodini, while others ally them with the otherwise Arctic tribe Dicrostonychini and place them outside the clade containing other voles. A 2021 phylogenetic study found Phenacomyini to form a sister group to Dicrostonychini and synonymized it with them.
