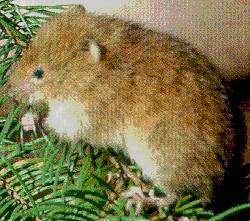
- Red tree vole, (Arborimus longicaudus)

Scientific classification
- Kingdom: Animalia
- Phylum: Chordata
- Class: Mammalia
- Order: Rodentia
- Family: Cricetidae
- Subfamily: Arvicolinae
- Tribe: Phenacomyini
- Genus: Arborimus; Taylor, 1915

Type species
- Phenacomys longicaudus True, 1890

Species
- Arborimus albipes Arborimus longicaudus Arborimus pomo

= Tree vole =

Tree voles

Genus of rodents

The genus Arborimus is a group of voles found in western North America. The genus name is Latin for "tree mouse". Some sources include this genus with the heather voles, genus Phenacomys, and both are classified in the tribe Phenacomyini.

These animals live in forested areas and two species live in trees. They are small rodents with short ears and long legs. They are primarily herbivorous. Predators include owls and mustelids.

Species in this genus are notable for their extremely unusual life history; females have an arboreal lifestyle, living up to 30 meters above the ground in trees, while males (despite being capable of climbing) burrow underground or live in piles of vegetation. They live apart for most of the year aside from during the breeding season, when males climb the trees to mate with the females and build nests. Following the breeding season, males climb back to the ground, leaving the females to rear the offspring in the trees.

== Classification ==
The complete list of species is:

- White-footed vole (Arborimus albipes)
- Red tree vole (Arborimus longicaudus)
- Sonoma tree vole (Arborimus pomo)

Based on mitochondrial DNA, A. pomo and A. albipes are more closely related to one another than either are to A. longicaudus. This is in contrast to previous suggestions of A. albipes being the sister species to all other species in the genus.
