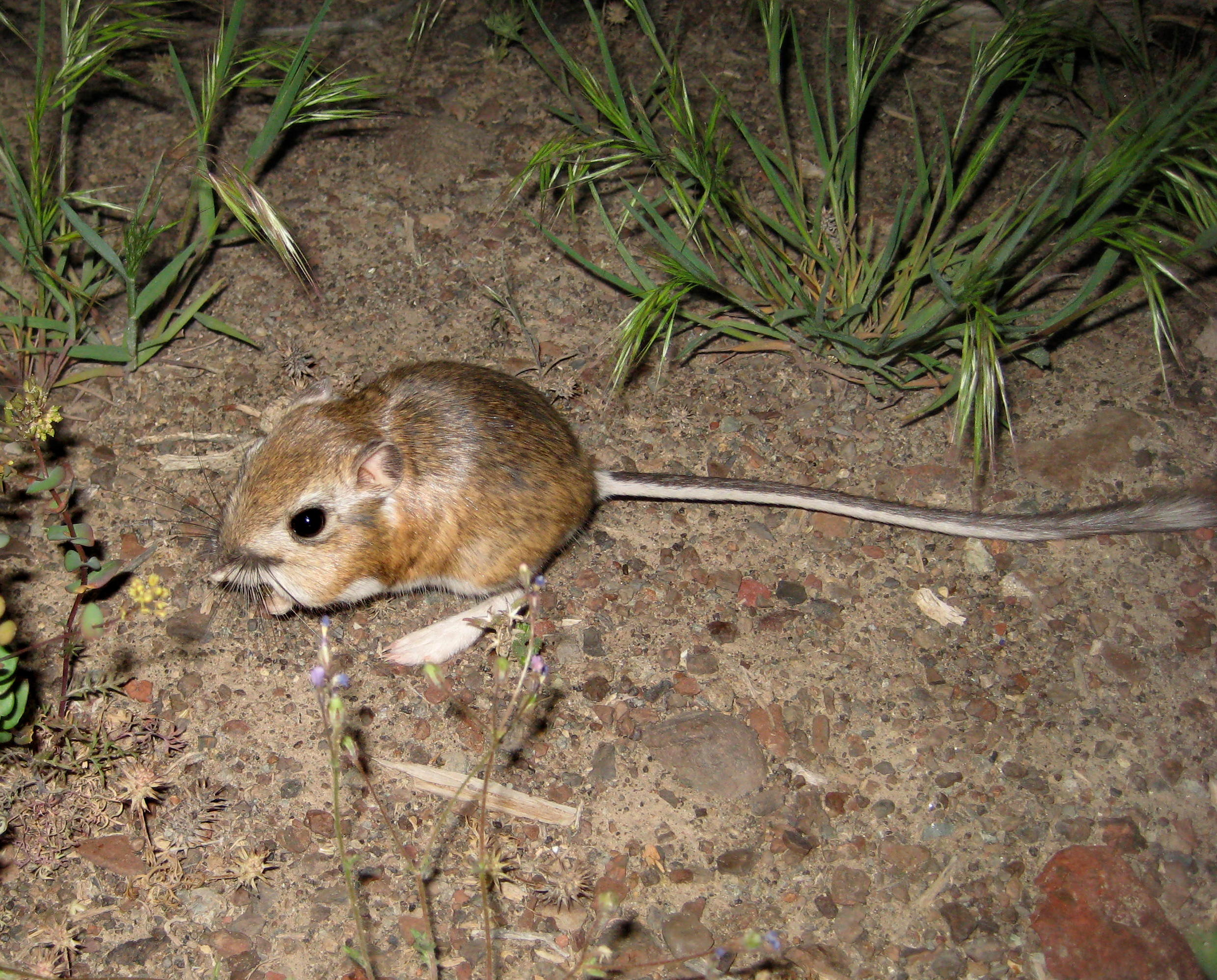
- A pale kangaroo mouse in Nevada

Scientific classification
- Kingdom: Animalia
- Phylum: Chordata
- Class: Mammalia
- Order: Rodentia
- Family: Heteromyidae
- Subfamily: Dipodomyinae
- Genus: Microdipodops; Merriam, 1891

Type species
- Microdipodops megacephalus Merriam, 1891

Species
- M. megacephalus M. pallidus
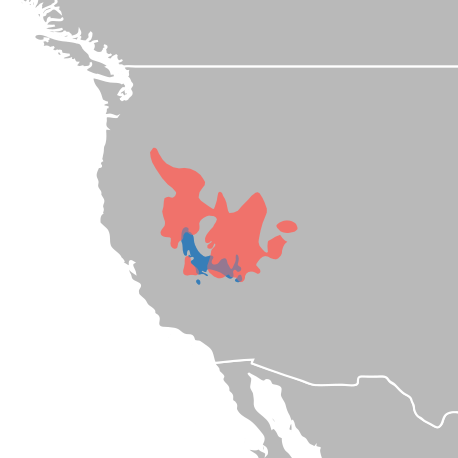
- Microdipodops distribution M. megacephalus in red, M. pallidus in blue

= Kangaroo mouse =

Kangaroo mouse Temporal range: Late Pleistocene – Recent

Genus of mammals

There are two species of kangaroo mouse (genus Microdipodops) native to the Great Basin Desert of the western United States, predominantly found in the state of Nevada. The name "kangaroo mouse" alludes to the species' extraordinary jumping ability, similar to the much larger-bodied kangaroos. The two species are:

- Dark kangaroo mouse – Microdipodops megacephalus
- Pale kangaroo mouse – Microdipodops pallidus

Both species of kangaroo mouse live in sandy desert ecosystems, and forage for seeds and vegetation amongst the scrub brush of their native habitat. The dark kangaroo mouse is also known to feed occasionally on insects and carrion. The mice rarely drink water, instead deriving it metabolically from the food they eat. The kangaroo mouse collects food and maintains large caches in their burrows, which are excavated to a length of between 3 and 8 ft (0.91 and 2.44 m). The burrow, the entrance to which the mouse covers during daylight hours, is also used to raise litters of between 2 and 7 young. The pale kangaroo mouse burrows only in fine sand, while the dark kangaroo mouse prefers fine, gravelly soils but may also burrow in sand or sandy soil.

Kangaroo mice are nocturnal, and are most active in the two hours following sunset. They are believed to hibernate during cold weather. Although data suggests populations of both pale and dark kangaroo mice are similarly sized, there is still some concern for the survival of smaller and more vulnerable Microdipodops subpopulations due to impending habitat threats in the Great Basin Desert.

The kangaroo mice are closely related to the kangaroo rats, which belong to the same subfamily, Dipodomyinae.

== Distinguishing features ==
The difference between a pale and dark kangaroo mouse is the color of their fur which is suggested in their names. While a dark kangaroo mouse has dark brown and black fur, a pale kangaroo mouse has a lighter, pale brown color.

Both pale and dark Microdipodops species share the same features such as having wide eyes, long and silky fur, shortened forelegs, elongated hind legs, and a long, slim tail with fur at the end that is used for balance. The average tail length is 84 mm (3.3 in) (inclusive of a range of 68 to 103 mm (2.7 to 4.1 in)). Their hind legs are proportionately large with fringed stiff hairs at the side and the undersurface of their feet to help through movement in sandy desert habitats. An average kangaroo mouse adult weighs 13.5 g (0.48 oz) (inclusive of a range from 10 to 17 g (0.35 to 0.60 oz)) with an average total length of 158.5 mm (6.24 in) (inclusive of a range from 140 to 177 mm (5.5 to 7.0 in)) and an average hind foot with the length of 25 mm (0.98 in).

Due to their extremely inflated auditory bullae, that is extended in the upper portion of their head, and large ear structure, kangaroo mice skulls are relatively larger in size to their body which contributes to their keen hearing used to detect predators.

== Diet ==
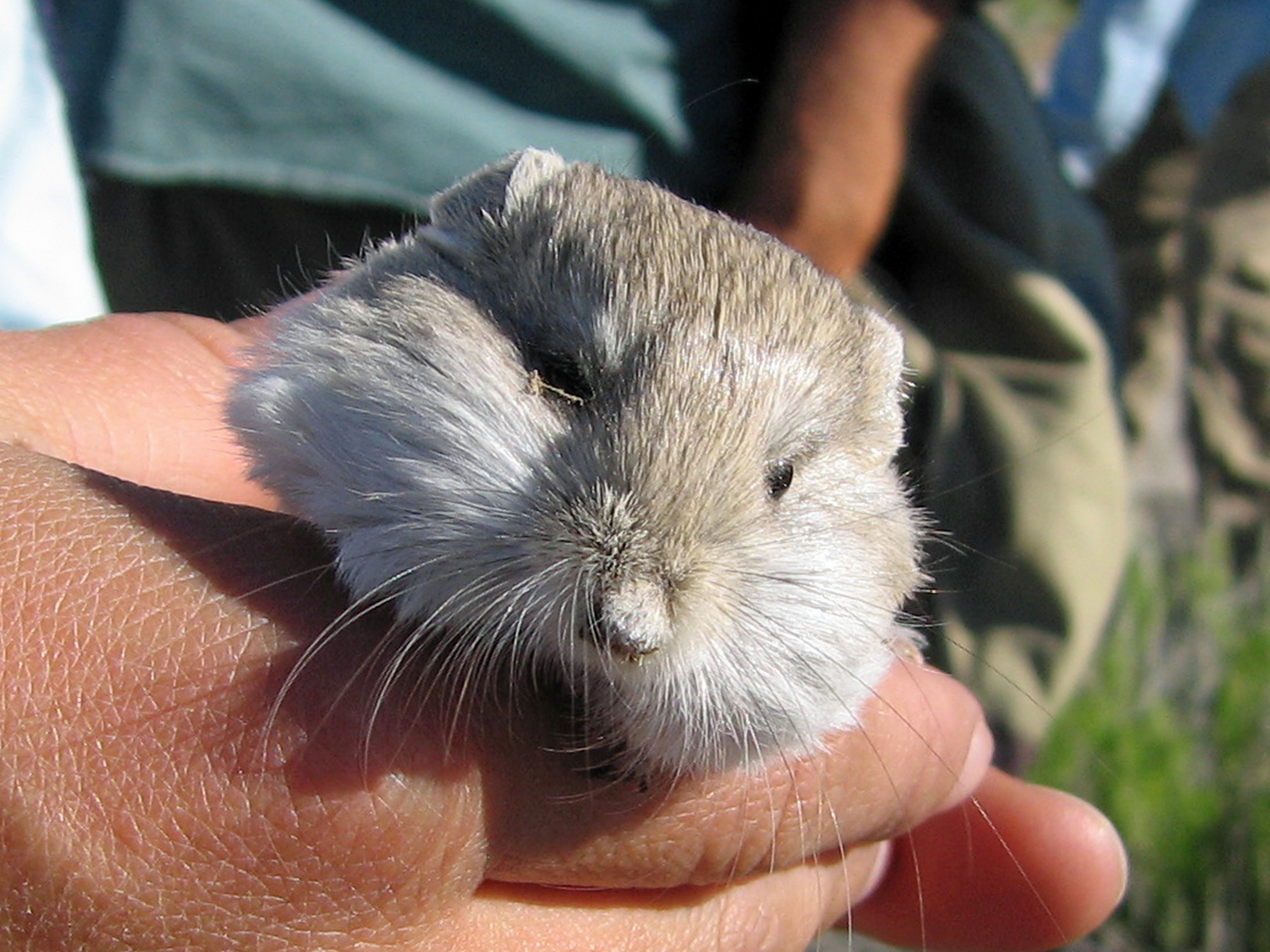
Pale kangaroo mouse with filled cheek pouches.

Both dark and pale kangaroo mice are herbivores, primarily granivorous. Their intake of food consists of seeds, grains, and nuts; in the summer insects are taken as well. Kangaroo mice use the front of their teeth to husk seeds, then carry and store in their fur-lined cheek pouches back to their burrowed homes. An extraordinary fact about some heteromyid species, such as the kangaroo mouse, is that they can spend several extended periods of time, even lifetimes, without consuming water. This is due to their efficient kidneys and ability to extract sufficient water from food and is essential in their survival in desert areas. The fat they get from their food is also stored in their tail.

== Predation ==
The fur color of both pale and dark kangaroo mice aid in blending in to background environments against predators. The system of their complex burrows help them in escaping predators, and a high-pitched squeal is uttered when threatened.

=== Known predators ===
- Coyotes (Canis latrans)
- Weasels (Mustelidae)
- Owls (Strigidae)
- Rattlesnakes (Crotalus sp.)
- Foxes (Vulpes sp.)
- Badgers (Taxidea taxus)

== See also ==
- Kangaroo rat – a closely related heteromyid rodent of North America
- Hopping mouse – a similar murid rodent native to Australia; an example of parallel evolution
- Jerboa – a similar dipodid rodent native to northern Africa and Asia
- Jumping mouse – a family of dipodid rodents native to both China and North America
- Springhare – a similar pedetid rodent native to southern and eastern Africa
- Rat-kangaroo – a small-bodied Australian marsupial relative of the kangaroos and wallabies
