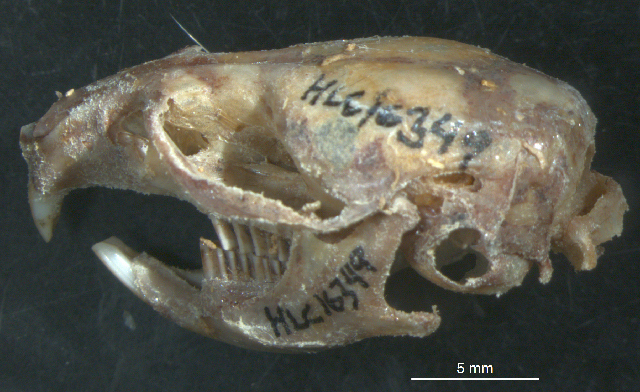
- Skull of Phenacomys intermedius

Scientific classification
- Kingdom: Animalia
- Phylum: Chordata
- Class: Mammalia
- Order: Rodentia
- Family: Cricetidae
- Subfamily: Arvicolinae
- Tribe: Phenacomyini
- Genus: Phenacomys; Merriam, 1889

Type species
- Phenacomys intermedius Merriam, 1889

Species
- Phenacomys intermedius Phenacomys ungava

= Heather vole =

Heather voles Temporal range: Early Pleistocene - Recent

Genus of rodents

The genus Phenacomys is a group of North American voles. The genus name comes from the Greek for "imposter mouse."

These animals live in forested, alpine and tundra areas, which often include plants of the heath family. They are small rodents with long fur and short ears, legs and tails. They eat green plants, seeds and berries in summer and bark and buds of shrubs at other times. Predators include mustelids, owls and hawks.

Some sources include the tree voles, genus Arborimus, in this genus. At one time, the two species of heather vole were considered to be a single species.

The complete list of living species is:

- Western heather vole (Phenacomys intermedius)
- Eastern heather vole (Phenacomys ungava)

== Description ==
Phenacomys intermedius, known as the western heather vole is a small rodent with a short tail that very closely resembles the montane vole and was even called the "deceiver mouse " for this reason. The hair of the heather vole is mostly gray to brown but the underside hair color is white to gray. In addition, these voles have whiskers extending to about their shoulders. This mammal burrows and is most active during the evening and night. Western heather voles are mainly found in open coniferous forests that contain small shrubs or vegetation on the outskirts as well as meadows in British Columbia, Canada. This species of voles are relatively uncommon as only 52 were captured out of 659 total voles during a 3-year period in British Columbia while 366 Red-backed voles and 241 long-tailed voles were captured.

== Diet ==
The summer and winter diet of heather voles is predominantly kinnikinnick, a small shrub with evergreen leaves that produces red berries. These herbivores also feed on soapberry leaves and fruits during the summer months. The winter diet of Phenacomys intermedius is bark of bush willow, dwarf birch, sheep laurel, and blueberry. Additionally, they do store food in piles at the entrances of burrows at night during the summer and winter then feed on the food during the day when it is safer.

== Reproduction ==
The western heather vole breeding season is from May to August and may be potentially shortened in populations living in high-elevations. A maximum of three litters has been reported with a pregnancy period of about 19 to 24 days and an average of 3 to 4 offspring per litter. Although these reports are of captive western heather voles and larger litter sizes of up to 7 are possible in wild voles.

== Habitat ==
The range of western heather voles is restricted to the Pacific Northwest of North America, specifically Canada and they are the most common rodent in this area of the subfamily Microtinae. The range of western heather voles is not well known but their range is from west central British Columbia then south to California/New Mexico. There is an uncertainty of distribution such that they have even been found in parts of Alaska and this uncertainty is due to limited sample size of captured heather voles because they do not enter traps often.

They tend to use willow as their habitat the most and heather plants less. They also prefer wet meadows and the borders of forests as well as rock, grassland and herbfield habitats when available. There is a variety of habitats for this species but they tend to live in areas with more vegetation cover compared to rock cover. However, it has been reported that a mixture of medium to large rock cover was used as a habitat greater than equal sized or smaller rocks.

== Behavior ==
While heather voles do have a feeding behavior towards seeds it was discovered that when provided different types of seed, heather voles had no preference between different types and ate very little seeds overall. This is thought to be due to the fact that P. intermedius mainly feed on leaves and berries while eating few seeds even when high in availability as shown in studies. This proves that heather voles generally do have a feeding behavior preference to leaves and berries rather than seeds. Other than feeding behaviors, these mammals use short burrow systems during the summer months and build their nests for reproduction under a rock or stump. The nests are consisted of leaves, twigs, grass and other plants. They have been reported as having a temper when captured, specifically researchers have observed male to male aggression and females with offspring having aggressive behaviors towards intruders. The females are the single provider of the young and heather vole females have an equal ratio of male and female offspring.

== History ==
The heather vole has also been split into three distinct clades, the Oregon and California clade, the Washington clade and the Northern and Interior clade. It is speculated that intervals of glaciation over time may have led to the range growth and contraction of the species. It is thought that geographical barriers were present during this cycle of climate change prevented clades from associating and coming in contact with each other.

Additionally, fossils of P. intermedius from the Pleistocene age have been found in northern Arkansas and Tennessee which is much more south than the current distribution. Lastly, during the Holocene time period, climatic change occurred and the only fit habitat was mountainous "islands" for the Phanacomys and eventually led to their extinction in certain areas such as the Great Basin range. It is estimated that the Heather vole diverged from its most closely related sister lineage in the same subfamily of Arvicolinae about 5.37 million years ago.

Unusual features in the teeth of Phenacomys voles suggest that the genus may have arisen relatively early within the evolutionary history of voles, probably in early Pliocene Beringia, from an Asian ancestor. The earliest American fossils date from about 1.5 million years ago, and were discovered in present-day Idaho. Similarly aged fossils belonging to two extinct species, P. gryci and P. deeringensis, have been discovered in Yakutia. During the Ice Ages of the Pleistocene, Phenacomys voles lived as far south as Arkansas. Early Pleistocene fossils of Phenacomys have been found in the Netherlands.
