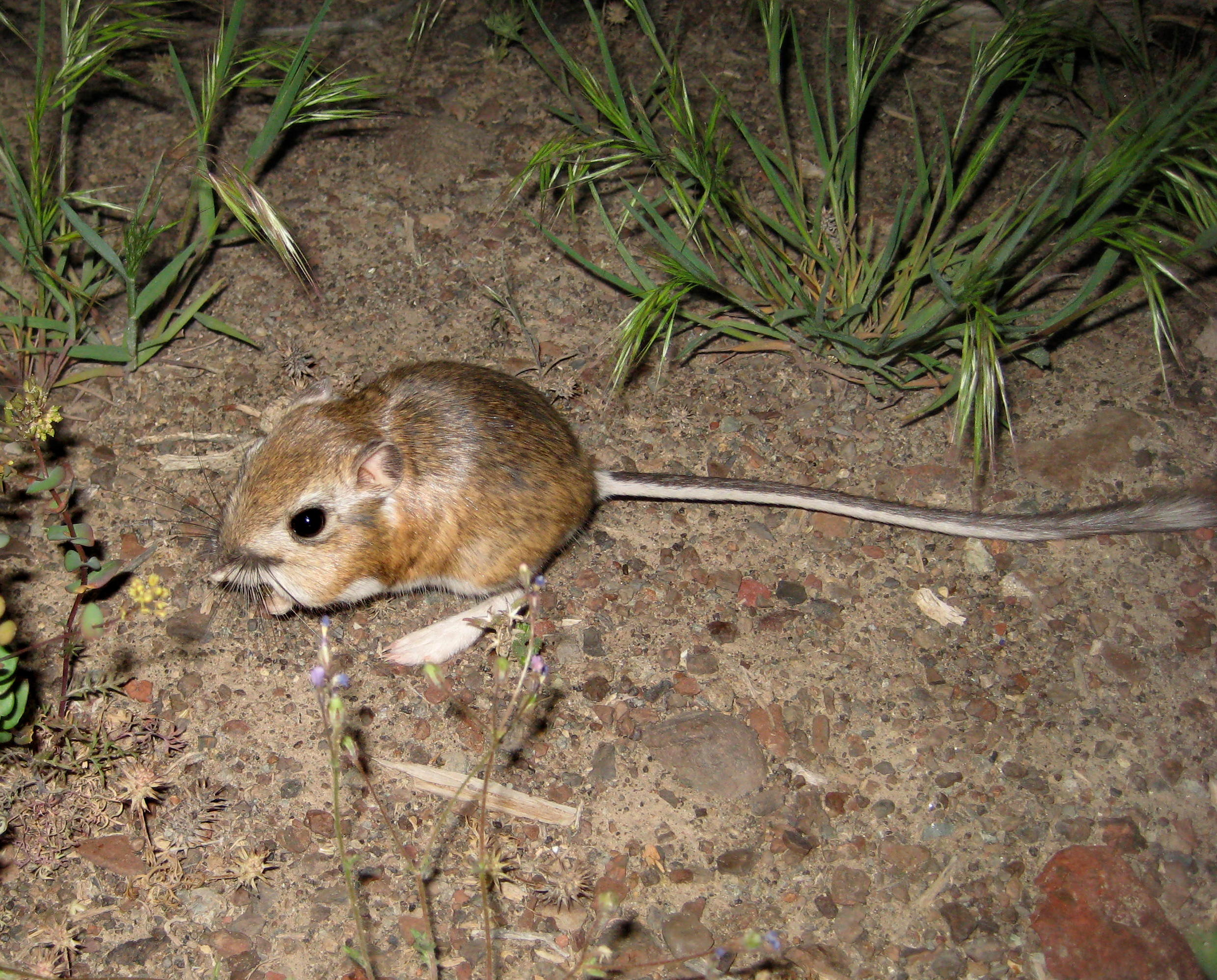
- A Pale Kangaroo Mouse in Nevada

Conservation status
- Least Concern (IUCN 3.1)

Scientific classification
- Kingdom: Animalia
- Phylum: Chordata
- Class: Mammalia
- Infraclass: Placentalia
- Order: Rodentia
- Family: Heteromyidae
- Genus: Microdipodops
- Species: M. pallidus

Binomial name
- Microdipodops pallidus Merriam, 1901
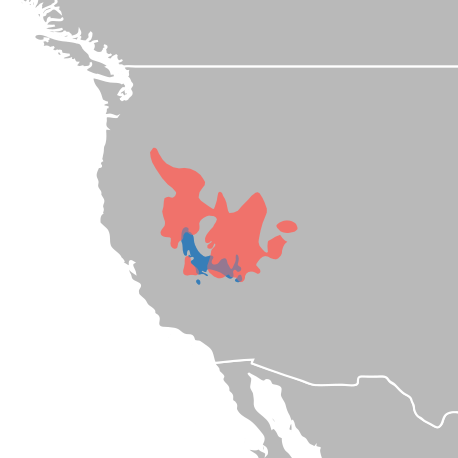
- Microdipodops distribution M. pallidus in blue

= Pale kangaroo mouse =

Species of rodent

The pale kangaroo mouse or Soda Spring Valley kangaroo mouse (Microdipodops pallidus) is a species of rodent in the family Heteromyidae. It is endemic to California and Nevada in the United States.

== Description ==
Named for its pale-furred back and long hind limbs and feet, the pale kangaroo mouse is a large-headed rodent with fur-lined external cheek pouches. This species is bipedal, meaning that it generally moves around on its strong hind legs, hopping much like a kangaroo.

The pallid kangaroo mouse, also called the pale kangaroo mouse, is one of two recognized species of kangaroo mouse, and is considered to be one of the most uncommon species of nocturnal desert dwelling rodent. The coloration of the pallid kangaroo mouse is a pale cinnamon color on the dorsal side with the ventral being covered by a pale whitish colored hair coat. The total length of the species ranges in size from 150 to 173 millimetres (5.9 to 6.8 in), with a tail length alone of 74 to 99 millimetres (2.9 to 3.9 in). The hind foot measures in length from 25 to 27 millimetres (0.98 to 1.06 in), and the weight range is between 10.3 and 16.8 grams (0.36 and 0.59 oz).

== Ecology ==
=== Habitat ===
While both the dark and the pallid kangaroo mouse species are desert dwelling, each species have unique habitat associations within the Great Desert Basin in North America where they are found. The pallid kangaroo mouse is found in central Nevada and a limited range in the eastern desert region of California. The pallid kangaroo mouse is a sand obligate species and has been known to be an indicator of the health of the sand habitats of the Great Basin Desert. Kangaroo mice are considered specialists in ecology, with regards to surviving within extreme desert environments. This allows scientists to assess the health of the ecosystem by studying in which locations the mice are located and which they avoid.

=== Diet ===
The pallid kangaroo mouse has a diet that is grain based and have been known to supplement their diet with insects where they derive most of their water needs, as they are not known to consume free water.

== Behavior ==
The desert is an extreme environment with unpredictable food resources. The pallid kangaroo mouse has developed some behavioral adaptations as a way of utilizing food in this environment. Pale kangaroo mice will collect seeds and then cache them in specific locations. They are known to have multiple caches so as to prevent any competing species from stealing their entire food source. In addition to their caching behaviors, kangaroo mice have other behavioral adaptation as a nocturnal desert dwelling species. One study followed the behavior of the kangaroo mice to avoid moonlight. While the reasons behind this behavior are not fully known, it is thought that it is to avoid predation, by risk of moonlight exposure.
