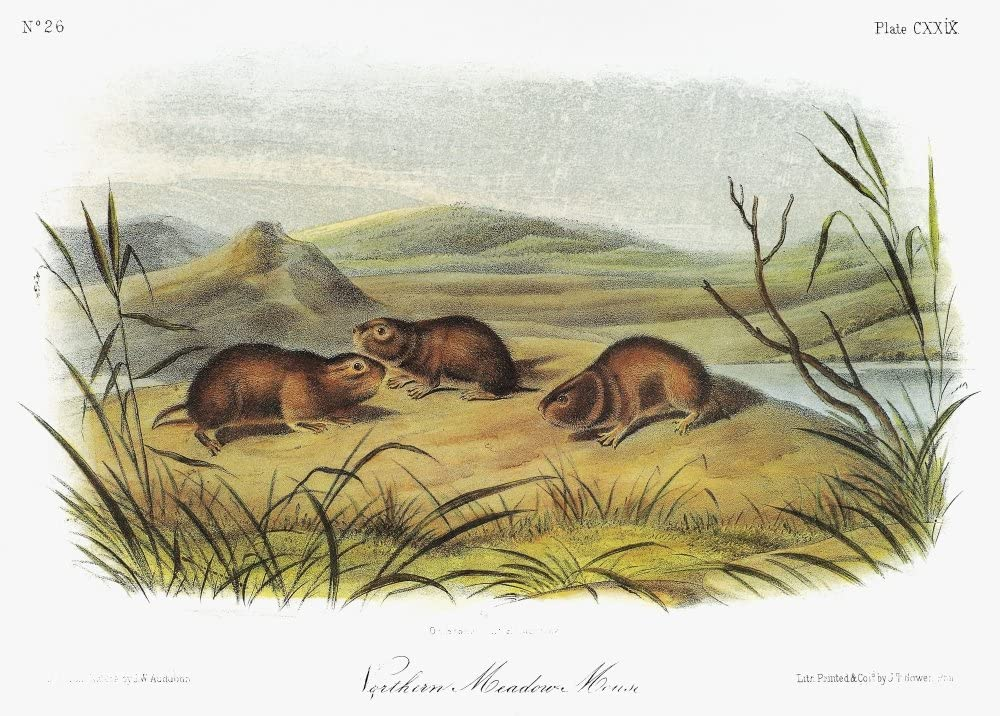

Conservation status
- Least Concern (IUCN 3.1)

- Secure (NatureServe)

Scientific classification
- Kingdom: Animalia
- Phylum: Chordata
- Class: Mammalia
- Order: Rodentia
- Family: Cricetidae
- Subfamily: Arvicolinae
- Genus: Phenacomys
- Species: P. ungava

Binomial name
- Phenacomys ungava (Merriam, 1889)

Synonyms
- Phenacomys intermedius ungava

= Eastern heather vole =

Species of rodent

The eastern heather vole (Phenacomys ungava) is a small North American vole. Until recently, this species was considered to belong to the same species as the western heather vole (P. intermedius). It is also called the Ungava vole.

Though some studies have indicated that P. ungava is "rare" or "uncommon," other researchers have found that the animal can be common locally, and others have suggested that the population may undergo cyclic abundance.

== Description ==
Eastern heather voles are relatively small among vole species, measuring 11 to 15 cm (4.3 to 5.9 in) from nose to tail and weighing between 15 and 47 g (0.53 and 1.66 oz). They are very similar in appearance to the western heather vole, and can only be distinguished from them by subtle features of the coat color and the shape of the skull.

The fur is long and soft. The coat is brownish with a slight yellowish wash over the back and head, with pale grey underparts and feet, and brighter, almost russet, fur on the rump and flanks. The face and snout of adults have a more pronounced yellowish cast, contrasting with the rest of the head and body. The tail is short, measuring about a quarter of the animal's total length, and is paler underneath than on the upper surface. The ears are very small, and barely visible above the long fur.

Males have scent glands on their flanks, which can reach up to 28 mm (1.1 in) across. Females have eight teats.

== Distribution and habitat ==
Eastern heather voles are found across most of Canada, and in a few areas in the United States near the Great Lakes. Four subspecies have been recognised, although these are not universally accepted:

- P. u. ungava - northern Labrador, most of Ontario and Quebec, eastern Manitoba, extreme northeastern Minnesota
- P. u. crassus - southern Labrador
- P. u. mackenzii - northern Manitoba and Saskatchewan, most of Alberta, southern Nunavut, Northwest Territories and Yukon, northeastern British Columbia
- P. u. soperi - southwestern Manitoba, southern Saskatchewan, parts of western Alberta

They are most commonly found in coniferous forests dominated by pine and spruce, usually in areas with heavy undergrowth. However, they also inhabit rocky areas, willow scrubland, peat bogs, and semi-tundra environments. They are uncommon across much of their range, but may be very numerous in specific localities.

== Ecology and behaviour ==
Eastern heather voles are herbivorous, feeding on plant leaves and berries, especially blueberries, in summer and the bark, seeds, and buds of willows and shrubs in winter. They are among the few vertebrates capable of eating the bark of sheep laurel, and may play an important ecological role in recycling nutrients from this otherwise toxic source.

Predators include owls, hawks and carnivorous mammals, such as weasels and martens. They are active year-round, mainly near dusk or at night.

In summer, they live in burrows. The burrow consists of a single tunnel ending in a nest about 10 cm (3.9 in) across, located about 20 to 25 cm (7.9 to 9.8 in) below ground, and a separate latrine chamber. The nest chamber is lined with grass or other plant material. In winter, they inhabit larger nests constructed of leaves and twigs, and located above ground, where they can be protected by surrounding snow. They store food for later use year-round, placing it near the entrance to their burrows, in crevices or under rocks.

== Reproduction ==
Eastern heather voles breed from June to July, and produce litters of two to eight young after a gestation period of 21 days. The young are born hairless and blind, developing fur by day six, crawling by day eight, and opening their eyes by day fourteen of life. They are weaned by day seventeen, but do not reach the full adult size for over three months.

Females become sexually mature four to six weeks after birth, but males do not breed during their first summer. Normally, only a single litter is born each year, but, in at least some localities, a second litter may be born in August. They live for up to four years.
