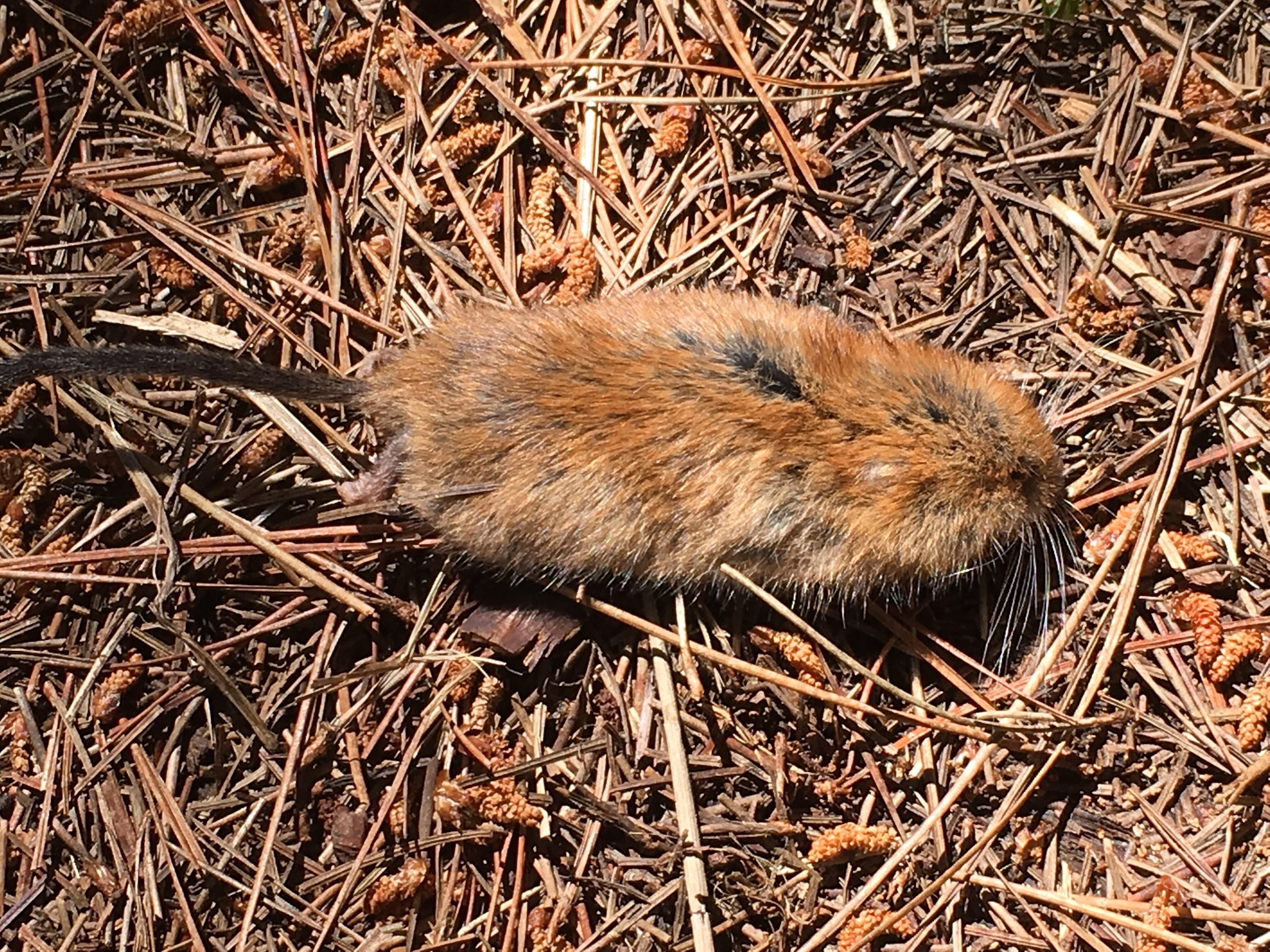

Conservation status
- Near Threatened (IUCN 3.1)

Scientific classification
- Kingdom: Animalia
- Phylum: Chordata
- Class: Mammalia
- Order: Rodentia
- Family: Cricetidae
- Subfamily: Arvicolinae
- Genus: Arborimus
- Species: A. pomo

Binomial name
- Arborimus pomo Johnson & George, 1991
- Arborimus pomo range map (2021), from the California Department of Fish and Wildlife

= Sonoma tree vole =

Species of rodent

The Sonoma tree vole or California red tree mouse (Arborimus pomo) is a species of rodent in the family Cricetidae. The species is found in northwest California. The preferred habitat for this primarily arboreal vole is old-growth Douglas-fir forests.

== Description ==
Sonoma tree voles are brownish-red in color with a light grey belly. They have thick, hairy, brown tails. Females are 101 to 103 mm (4.0 to 4.1 in) in body length, with tails of 66 to 73 mm (2.6 to 2.9 in). Males are slightly smaller, at 95 to 98 mm (3.7 to 3.9 in) with a 64 to 68 mm (2.5 to 2.7 in) tail. They range in weight from 20 to 45 g (0.7 to 1.6 oz).

Sonoma tree voles are visually very similar to red tree voles (Arborimus longicaudus) and were thought to be one species prior to genetic analysis in 1991. Sonoma tree voles have a smaller body size compared to red tree voles, as well as skull and muscle differences. They are nocturnal and active year-round.

== Distribution ==
The Sonoma tree vole is found in the coastal temperate forests of northwestern California. They are found from the Oregon border to southern Sonoma County.

== Ecology and behavior ==
Sonoma tree voles live in nests, with males and females living in separate ones. These nests are located primarily in Douglas-fir trees 1.5 to 3.5 meters above ground. They usually build their own nests, but occasionally have been found to occupy nests of other arboreal rodents and birds.

Sonoma tree voles mainly feed on Douglas-fir trees, consuming the middle portion of their needles. They have been observed eating other conifers, such as the grand fir and Monterey pine. Its predators include the northern spotted owl, Humboldt marten, Pacific fisher, and raccoons.
