= Dark kangaroo mouse =

Conservation status
- Least Concern (IUCN 3.1)

Scientific classification
- Kingdom: Animalia
- Phylum: Chordata
- Class: Mammalia
- Order: Rodentia
- Family: Heteromyidae
- Genus: Microdipodops
- Species: M. megacephalus

Binomial name
- Microdipodops megacephalus Merriam, 1891
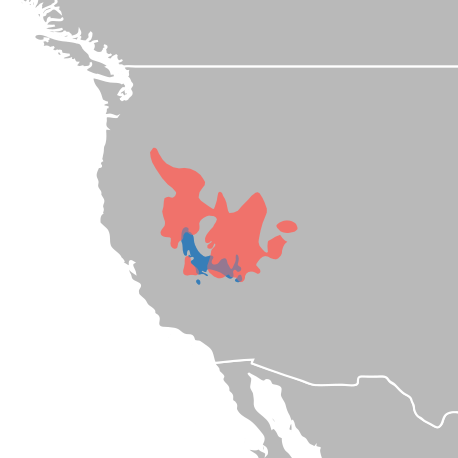
- Microdipodops distribution M. megacephalus in red

Species of rodent

The dark kangaroo mouse (Microdipodops megacephalus) is a species of rodent in the family Heteromyidae. It is found in California, Idaho, Nevada, Oregon and Utah in the United States.

== Description ==
The dark kangaroo mouse (Microdipodops megacephalus), also known as Owyhee River kangaroo mouse, is named for its dark-furred back, long hind feet, and the way it moves around by hopping on its hind legs like Australian kangaroos. It belongs to the order Rodentia and Family Heteromyidae. Its head is large in comparison to its body size due to enlarged auditory bullae. It has a relatively short neck large ears, prominent eyes, a long snout, long whiskers and a fat, haired tail.

The coat of the dark kangaroo mouse is long, silky, and soft with its back being brownish to greyish black while its belly has a greyish or whitish hue. Its tail is swollen in the middle (fat deposits). The fat deposits vary in size as the season changes because it is used as a source of energy during dormancy. The tails are thickest before entering winter hibernation and thin in the spring, when they come out of hibernation and assume normal activity. This is unique among North American small mammals.

There is no sexual dimorphism shown in dark kangaroo mice except for zygomatic breadth. Length of hind foot, cranial measurement, and mandibular length vary little while weight is highly variable in the population. The total length ranges from 138 to 177 millimetres (5.43 to 6.97 in) with an average of 160 millimetres (6.30 in), length of tail: 68 to 103 millimetres (2.68 to 4.06 in), hind foot length: 23 to 27 millimetres (0.91 to 1.06 in), weight of adults ranges from 10 to 16.9 grams (0.35 to 0.60 oz) with an average of 13.1 grams (0.46 oz).

== Distribution and habitat ==
The dark kangaroo mouse species is native to the west of United States ( southeastern Oregon, northeastern and central-eastern California, Nevada, the tip of southwestern Idaho, and west-central Utah). They inhabit dry desert areas living in loose sand and gravels (found in the Upper Sonoran life zone).

This species is listed as "Least Concern" on the Red List because it is relatively widespread, although there has been a slight reduction in its population due to loss of habitats caused by modern agriculture.

Their main predators are owls, foxes, badgers and snakes.

== Diet ==
Dark kangaroo mice mostly eat small seeds (granivores), which are carried back to their burrows in their cheek pouches. They also feed on some insects (insectivore) in the summer. This change in diet is suggested to be caused by pocket mice (Perognathus longimembris) being at their peak activity and competing for food with the dark kangaroo mice.

Kangaroo mice do not drink water actively, instead utilizing water from their food source. They also have adaptation mechanisms to further conserve water: being active at night (lower temperature so lose less water), concentrating their urine, and producing dry feces.

== Behavior ==
Dark kangaroo mice are mostly bipedal and move around by hopping on their two hind legs. Using bipedalism is suggested to be a result of foraging behaviors and using it as a locomotion mode only serves as a side function. They also have been seen to be moving on all four limbs when moving in contained spaces such as a cage.

These kangaroo mice are nocturnal animals with the peak of activity in the first 2 hours after sunset. Their activity is only observed from March through October as they go into hibernation during winter months. These animals are also sensitive to moonlight and temperature. Their activities are decreased when the temperature is out of their optimal range and in the presence of moonlight.
