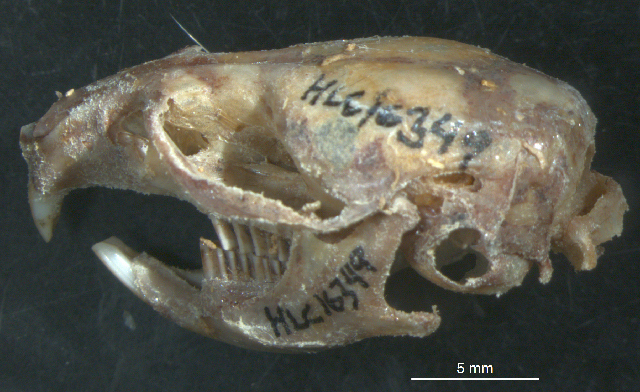

Conservation status
- Least Concern (IUCN 3.1)

Scientific classification
- Kingdom: Animalia
- Phylum: Chordata
- Class: Mammalia
- Order: Rodentia
- Family: Cricetidae
- Subfamily: Arvicolinae
- Genus: Phenacomys
- Species: P. intermedius

Binomial name
- Phenacomys intermedius (Merriam, 1889)

= Western heather vole =

Species of rodent

The western heather vole (Phenacomys intermedius) is a small vole found in western North America. Until recently, the eastern heather vole (P. ungava) was considered to be a subspecies. They have short ears with stiff orange hair inside and a short thin tail which is paler underneath. Their long soft fur is brownish with silver grey underparts. They are roughly 14 cm (5.5 in) long with a tail length shorter than one-half their body length, approximately 50 mm (2.0 in). They weigh about 40 g (1.4 oz).

== Distribution and habitat ==
Western heather voles are found in alpine meadows, open shrubby areas, dry forests with shrubs below to provide cover and tundra regions, usually near water, in British Columbia, the Yukon and the western United States.

In summer, they live in burrows where they make nests of grasses and small foliage. These nests are usually near the surface, above 20 cm from the ground, and after often underneath objects such as rocks and logs. In winter, they tunnel under the snow. They store food for later use year-round.

== Behavior and ecology ==
They feed on plant leaves and berries in summer and plant bark and buds in winter, also seeds and fungi. Predators include owls, hawks and carnivorous mammals.

They are active year-round, and are crepuscular, being more active at twilight and at night than during the day.

When captured, western heather vole are docile and non-aggressive, though are generally more aggressive during breeding season.

=== Reproduction ===
The female vole has 2 or 3 litters of 2 to 9 young in a nest made from grasses. Aside from western heather voles that live in high-elevations, which may exhibit shorter breeding seasons, their standard breeding season is from May to August. Both male and females are mature after one year and have a lifespan of 4 years or less.

== Population ==
The population of this animal has been reduced in some parts of its range because of clearcutting of forests. As also seen in other high-elevation populations, climate change and the resulting melting of ice sheets in habitats previously inhabited by western heather vole have caused the population and differentiation of populations within the species to decrease. Some populations have also migrated north due to global warming, as during the Last Glacian Maximum, western heather voles have populations much farther south than they are currently, some as far south as Tennessee and Arkansas.
