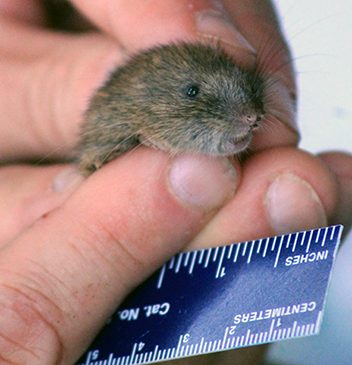

Conservation status
- Least Concern (IUCN 3.1)

Scientific classification
- Kingdom: Animalia
- Phylum: Chordata
- Class: Mammalia
- Order: Rodentia
- Family: Cricetidae
- Subfamily: Arvicolinae
- Genus: Arborimus
- Species: A. albipes

Binomial name
- Arborimus albipes (Merriam, 1901)

= White-footed vole =

White-footed Vole

Species of rodent

The white-footed vole (Arborimus albipes) is a species of rodent in the family Cricetidae. It is found only in the northwest United States. Its natural habitat is temperate forests.
