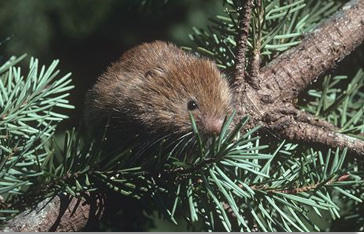

Conservation status
- Near Threatened (IUCN 3.1)

Scientific classification
- Kingdom: Animalia
- Phylum: Chordata
- Class: Mammalia
- Infraclass: Placentalia
- Order: Rodentia
- Family: Cricetidae
- Subfamily: Arvicolinae
- Genus: Arborimus
- Species: A. longicaudus

Binomial name
- Arborimus longicaudus (F. W. True, 1890)

= Red tree vole =

Species of rodent

The red tree vole (Arborimus longicaudus) is a rodent of the Pacific Northwest, found in the US states of Oregon and California. They were formerly known as Phenacomys longicaudus and have also been called the red tree mouse.

== Description ==
The red tree vole is a rodent in the family Cricetidae. It is found only in coastal forests of Oregon and northern California. They feed exclusively on the needles of conifers, primarily Douglas-fir (Pseudotsuga menziesii), though they occasionally eat the needles of western hemlock (Tsuga heterophylla), Sitka spruce (Picea sitchensis), grand fir (Abies grandis), and Bishop pine (Pinus muricata).

Red tree voles are about 6-8 in long, including the tail. When they are young, they exhibit a dull brown coat and develop a more reddish color with age. They are nocturnal and very difficult to see, but they can be detected by finding piles or wads of resin ducts (see below) on the ground.

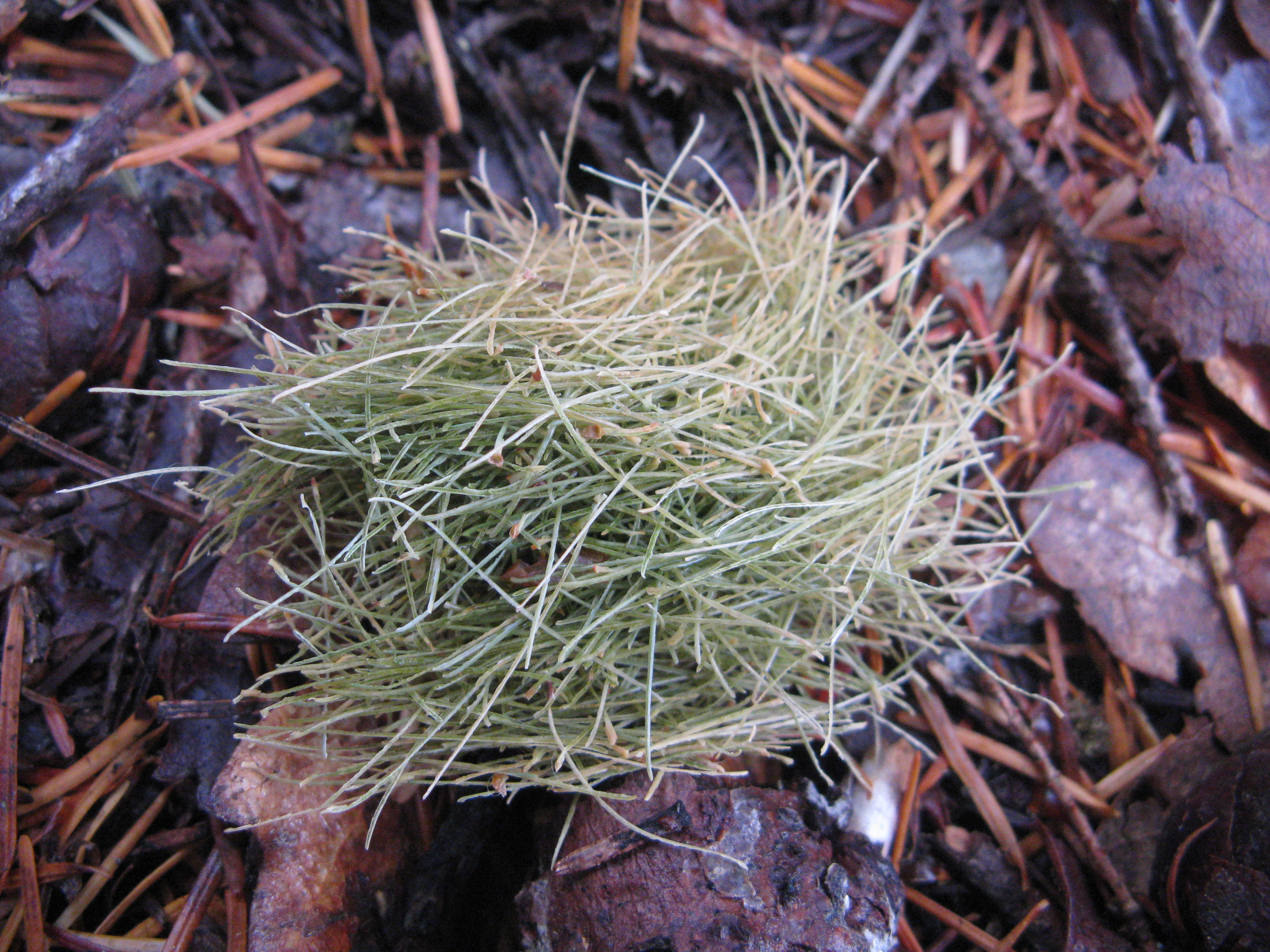
The characteristic pile of discarded resin ducts (which run along the outside edges of Douglas-fir needles) produced by a red tree vole when eating.

== Nesting and home range ==
Red tree voles live almost exclusively in Douglas-fir trees, though they have occasionally been found in Sitka spruce and western hemlock (Tsuga heterophylla). They sometimes spend their lives in just one tree, and in very large trees with complex structure many generations can live in different parts of the same tree. Red tree voles have been shown to have a home-range averaging around 800 m^{2}, though this area is somewhat smaller in old forest (<80 years) and larger in young forest. Within this home-range they can have nests in up to 6 different trees, although 2 nests are average for females and 3 nests are average for males.

When eating Douglas-fir needles, they carefully remove the fine resin ducts (which resemble coarse, straight hairs) along each edge of the needle, which then become a major component of their nests (see image below). As well as these resin ducts, their nests are composed of small Douglas-fir cuttings and their own scat. These nests are often built on or in large or epicormic branches, broken tops, cavities and split trunks, and are always within the live crown.

== Reproduction ==
Both sexes of red tree vole build nests, though the maternal nests are considerably larger.

Red tree voles have small litters consisting of 1 to 4 offspring and a long gestation period of 28 days compared to other Microtines. Juveniles depend on their mothers for 47 to 60 days before complete independence. Females exhibit post-partum mating where they can breed within a few days of giving birth and it is common to find two separate litters living in the same nest. During peak breeding periods (winter and spring), males disperse and travel longer distances from home in search for females that are sexually receptive. Females tend to stay closer to their nests, therefore having smaller home ranges.

== Predation ==
The northern spotted owl is one of the red tree voles' primary predators. Recent studies show that short-tailed weasels are also another primary predator of the red tree vole. Females are easier to detect by predators due to their maternal nests. The time they spend outside of their nests searching for food to bring back for their young also puts them at a higher risk of predation.

== Conservation efforts ==
Their habitats in old forests have become a concern for the species. Logging and habitat fragmentation has determined their status as vulnerable on the list of sensitive species on the Oregon coast. They are vulnerable to timber harvest due to their arboreal lifestyle and their low reproductive rates contribute to the concern of the species becoming further threatened. They are an important food source for the threatened Northern Spotted Owl and have been listed as a "survey and manage species" under the Northwest Forest Plan (NWFP) in order to help manage the area's ecosystem.
