= Adolphus Lewis Heermann =

American doctor, naturalist, ornithologist, and explorer

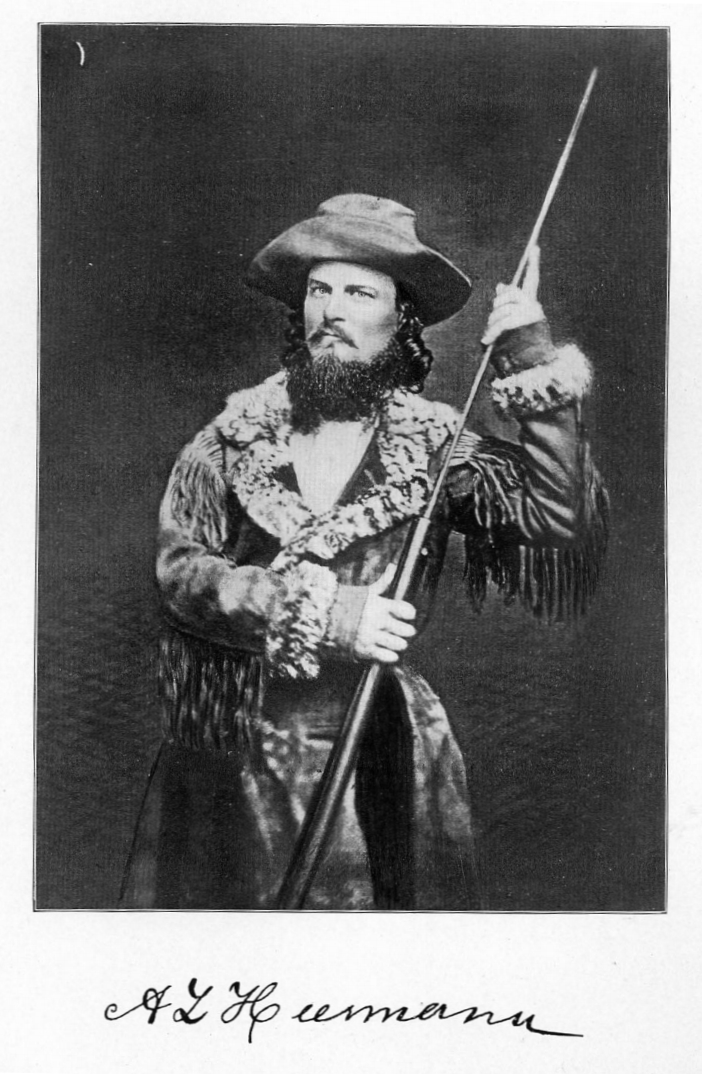
- Heermann, c. 1850.
- Born: October 21, 1821; New Orleans, Louisiana, U.S.
- Died: September 27, 1865 (aged 43); Bexar County, Texas, U.S.

Adolphus Lewis Heermann (October 21, 1821 – September 27, 1865) was an American medical doctor, naturalist, ornithologist, and explorer. He travelled throughout the U.S. collecting samples and cataloging various species of birds, fish, reptiles, and plants. He participated in the fifth Pacific Railroad Survey as the surgeon and naturalist of a group led by Lt. Robert S. Williamson and reported on the various birds along the route.

Heermann was born in New Orleans, Louisiana, the oldest son of Lewis (Surgeon in the Navy, August 3, 1779 - May 1833) and Eliza. After the death of his father, his mother moved to Baltimore and then took them to Europe around 1836. After their education in Europe, Adolphus and his brother Theodore came back to New York in 1842.

From 1862 he was suffering from locomotor ataxia, a symptom of syphilis and when Henry Dresser visited San Antonio in 1863, he was able to meet Heermann and the two went riding together on collecting trips. Heermann's legs had to be strapped into the saddle of his horse so that he would not fall off.

Adolphus Heerman died of an accidental gun-shot wound: brother Theodore, in a letter to Dresser, stated that Adolphus had gone out collecting alone, when his gun accidentally went off killing him.

== Discoveries and namesakes ==
Heermann collected specimens of birds, animals, and plants in the western United States during his expeditions and sent them to specialists, mainly at the Academy of Natural Sciences of Philadelphia. Several new taxa from his collections were named after him:

- Heermann's gull (Larus heermanni)
- Heermann's kangaroo rat (Dipodomys heermanni)
- Heermann’s song sparrow (now known as the Song Sparrow (Melospiza melodia heermani)
- Heermann's tarweed (Holocarpha heermannii)
