= Brachycoryna dolorosa =

Scientific classification
- Kingdom: Animalia
- Phylum: Arthropoda
- Class: Insecta
- Order: Coleoptera
- Suborder: Polyphaga
- Infraorder: Cucujiformia
- Family: Chrysomelidae
- Genus: Brachycoryna
- Species: B. dolorosa

Binomial name
- Brachycoryna dolorosa Van Dyke, 1925

Species of beetle

Brachycoryna dolorosa is a species of leaf beetle in the family Chrysomelidae. It is found in North America, where it has been recorded from California, Idaho, Montana, Utah and Washington.

== Description ==
Adults reach a length of about 2.1-3.1 mm. They have a black head and both the pronotum and elytron are shiny black, reddish-brown or yellow.

== Biology ==
The foodplant is unknown, but adults have been collected on Media elegans, Media sativa, Holocarpha heermannii, Hemizona species and Ceanothus cuneatus.
