= Brachycoryna =

Scientific classification
- Kingdom: Animalia
- Phylum: Arthropoda
- Clade: Pancrustacea
- Class: Insecta
- Order: Coleoptera
- Suborder: Polyphaga
- Infraorder: Cucujiformia
- Family: Chrysomelidae
- Tribe: Chalepini
- Genus: Brachycoryna; Guérin-Méneville, 1844

Genus of beetles

Brachycoryna is a genus of tortoise beetles and hispines in the family Chrysomelidae. There are seven described species in Brachycoryna.

== Species ==
These seven species belong to the genus Brachycoryna:

- Brachycoryna dolorosa Van Dyke, 1925^{i c g b}
- Brachycoryna hardyi (Crotch, 1874)^{i c g b}
- Brachycoryna longula Weise, 1907^{i c g b}
- Brachycoryna melsheimeri (Crotch, 1873)^{i c g b}
- Brachycoryna montana (Horn, 1883)^{i c g}
- Brachycoryna notaticeps Pic, 1928^{i c g}
- Brachycoryna pumila Guérin-Méneville, 1844^{i c g b}

Data sources: i = ITIS, c = Catalogue of Life, g = GBIF, b = Bugguide.net
