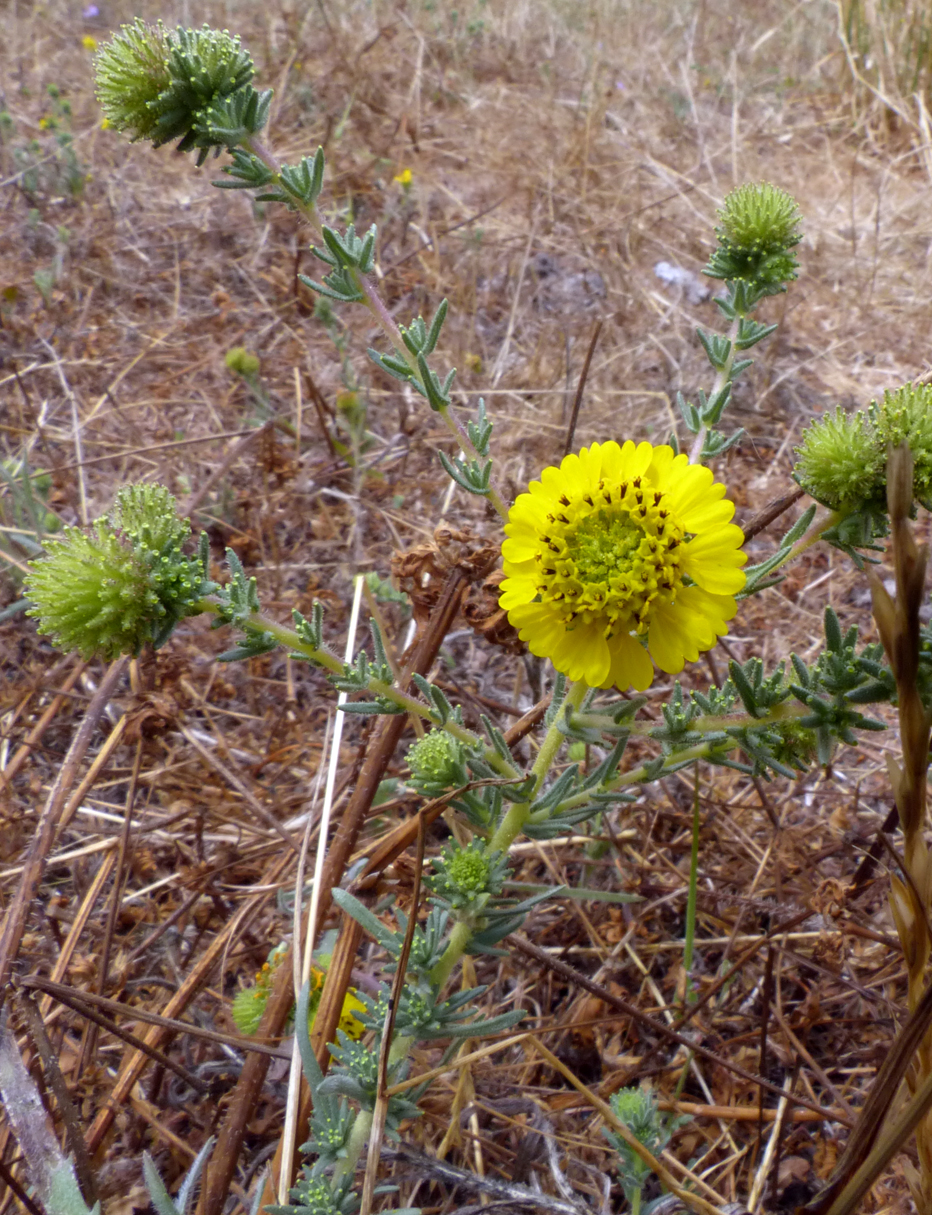
- The Santa Cruz tarplant is listed as threatened under the federal Endangered Species Act (ESA), and endangered under the state of California Endangered Species Act (CESA).

Conservation status
- Threatened (ESA)

Scientific classification
- Kingdom: Plantae
- Clade: Embryophytes
- Clade: Tracheophytes
- Clade: Angiosperms
- Clade: Eudicots
- Clade: Asterids
- Order: Asterales
- Family: Asteraceae
- Genus: Holocarpha
- Species: H. macradenia

Binomial name
- Holocarpha macradenia (DC.) Greene

Synonyms
- Hemizonia macradenia DC.

= Holocarpha macradenia =

Species of flowering plant

Holocarpha macradenia, commonly known as the Santa Cruz tarplant, is an endangered plant endemic to Northern California. Alternative common names for this plant are Santa Cruz tarweed or Santa Cruz sunflower.

== Distribution ==
The plant's principal range is on certain coastal terraces in Santa Cruz County and Monterey County. Smaller colonies are to the north in Alameda County, Contra Costa County, and Marin County. It is found from sea level to 110 metres (360 ft).

Specifically Santa Cruz tarplant likes to inhabit terraced locations of coastal or valley prairie grasslands with underlying sandy clay soils. Its characteristic habitat is in the California coastal prairie ecosystem, which may be the oldest stable ecosystem of the temperate world dating from about 600,000 years ago.

== Description ==
Santa Cruz tarplant is an annual wildflower that can grow to 50 cm tall, but is often much smaller. The flowering period is June to November. The growth habit is a single erect stem with larger specimens developing branches. Its leaves are linear and manifest longer near the plant base. The lower ranging leaves exhibit sharp, short teeth at their edges, while the upper leaves present edges that are rolled back, leading to a bristly feeling. Several other species have a similar general appearance, and can be easily mistaken for the Santa Cruz tarplant. The real Santa Cruz tarplant, though, has distinctive glands (see photos) that are not present in lookalikes.

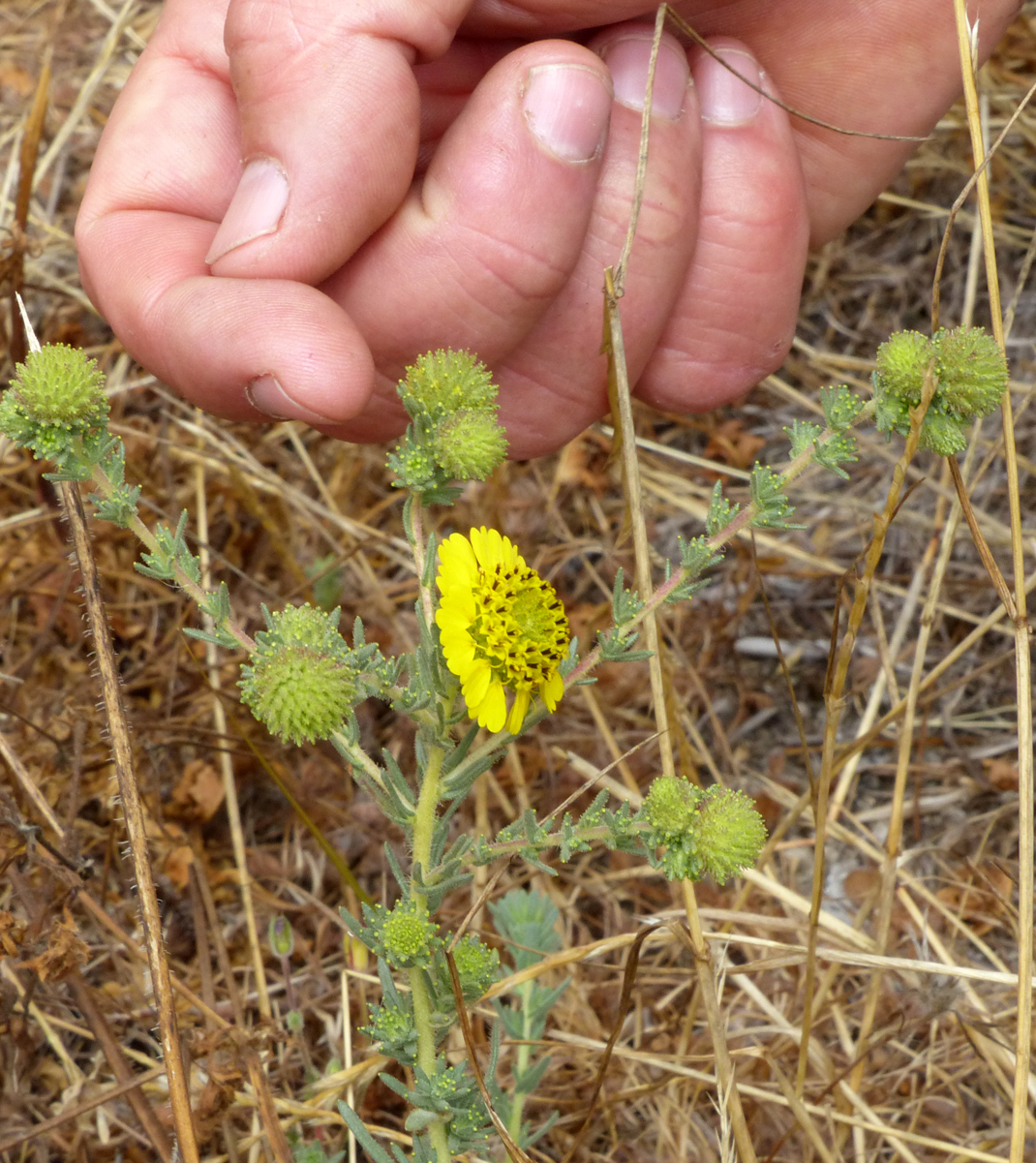
Holocarpha macradenia, commonly known as Santa Cruz tarweed, illustrating distinctive glands

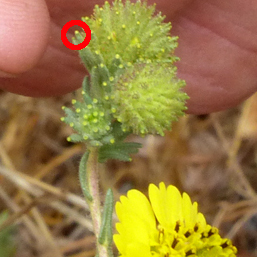
Zoom view of distinctive glands, one circled in red.

The aroma of the plant has variously been described as strong, citrusy, tangerine and Christmas tree-like. The pungent smell protects it by repelling many would-be feeders.

It has characteristic yellow daisy-like flowers, with black anthers giving the appearance of striking black dots in the flower center. It is distinguished by its large number of flowers: 8 to 16 three-lobed outer ray flowers and 40 to 90 central disk flowers, more than any others in the genus Holocarpha. The flowers are situated in dense clusters at the branch tips or along the branch on a very short stem.

Drought tolerance

The Santa Cruz tarplant has an extremely long tap root, allowing it to thrive longer into the season than most coastal wildflowers. The plant produces seedbanks, which may not germinate in the next season, but which can remain viable over a period of years. Blooming season is summer, when there is less competition for pollinators and also less competition for sunlight, since in its range many plants have died back from the summer drought. Further protection from the rainless summer is a resinous coating on leaves and stems, allowing retention of water until late in the season. These resins often adhere to livestock, and, in the case of facial adherence, lead to a mascara-like effect after dust adheres to the resin in turn.

== Protection and current status ==
Santa Cruz tarplant had been considered almost extinct by the year 1960. Subsequently, it was listed as a California endangered species and federal threatened species. Colonies are found in the city of Santa Cruz at the Arana Gulch greenbelt and near De La Veaga Golf Course, Twin Lakes, and along Graham Hill Road; in the city of Watsonville in grasslands along Harkins Slough plus a 3.4 acre coastal prairie called Tarplant Hill next to Struve Slough, Spring Hills Golf Course, and on Watsonville Airport property; and in the Elkhorn Slough watershed at the Elkhorn Slough Foundation's Porter Ranch in Monterey County.

In the 1980s other colonies were found in the San Francisco Bay Area, including a colony in Pinole, western Contra Costa County. Ex-situ conservation of that colony was used to allow construction of a new shopping center, and a limited number of seeds from that population were moved immediately across and east of Interstate 80 onto the CalTrans right-of-way. Additional seeds from that population were moved onto East Bay Regional Parks property, where most of these introduced populations died.

In another touch-and-go experiment, Santa Cruz tarplant has been shown to barely survive at the Arana Gulch colony in Santa Cruz, mostly due to lack of appropriate management, habitat fragmentation, and competition with non-native species. Active restoration experiments began in 2007 at Tarplant Hill in Watsonville by the owners, with support from the U.S. Fish and Wildlife Service Partners in Restoration Program.

== Populations protected as critical habitat ==
In 2002, the US Fish and Wildlife Service published the final designation of Critical Habitat for the species, as follows: UNIT A - Mezue (Contra Costa County, Wildcat Canyon Regional Park) - County/City ownership. UNIT B - Graham Hill - Private ownership. UNIT C - De Laveaga - State ownership. UNIT D - Arana Gulch - County/City ownership. UNIT E - Twin Lakes - State ownership. UNIT F - Rodeo Gulch - Private ownership. UNIT G - Soquel - Private and County/City ownership. UNIT H - Porter Gulch - Private ownership. UNIT I - Watsonville - State, County/City and Private ownership. UNIT J - Casserly - Private ownership. UNIT K - Elkhorn - Private ownership.

In 2002, a total of 1,175 ha (2,902 acres) was designated as Critical Habitat.

== Efforts at active management to restore plant populations ==
The Arana Gulch populations management, the City of Santa Cruz established their Adaptive Management Working Group (AMWG) which consisted of a group of stakeholders, whose composition was approved by the California Coastal Commission Executive Director. The members have been a researcher from UC Berkeley, a biologist from California Fish and Wildlife, a biologist from US Fish and Wildlife Service, an ecologist from the California Coastal Commission, three private consultants, a UC Cooperative Extension Livestock advisor, and Santa Cruz city staff from the Planning and Parks Departments. Semi-annual meetings were held from 2013 to 2016, with the last meeting March 14, 2016.

Twin Lakes State Park (Unit D0 population management between 1998 and 2003 consisted of mowing in 1998, 1999, and 2001 once in spring, and once in fall using a string trimmer. The litter was then removed using garden rakes or McCleods. The site was scraped using McCleods. In 2002, mowing continued and 15 nursery raised plants planted on February 6. The nursery plants were more robust and produced over ten times the number of seed heads than the naturally occurring individuals.

In 2002, 494 plants were grown from seeds harvested in previous years, and 344 of these plant survived, but were no more robust than the naturally occurring individuals. In 2002, where plants naturally occurred, was mowed twice as well as treated with a chain harrow.

== Population trends in individual plant populations ==
Ecological restoration projects to restore individual populations of the plants, their annual reports usually contain plant counts or estimations of the numbers of plants with a population during a certain year, and that data can be used to measure trends and successes of the restoration techniques used.

The Arana Gulch (Unit D) population first census in 1986 by Randy Morgan estimated that there were 100,000 plants on that site in Santa Cruz in four different "Areas", and by 2006 was extinct in three of the four areas, and in the remaining "Area A" had dropped to only 348 plants. Plants counts in 2013 only found 18 plants, in 2014 only 4 plants, and in 2015 zero, and 2016 34 plants. Zero plants at Arana Gulch grew in 2017, then 267 in 2018, and 47 in 2019.

The 2020 census at Arana Gulch found only a single wild plant growing in Area A, even though there were several growing earlier in spring that the cattle ate, plus five planted seedlings had survived over in Area C. The amount of native and weed cover of each "Area" was surveyed in October 2020, as follows: AREA A = 72% weed grasses, 4% broadleaf weeds, 3% native grasses—Danthonia, and 4% wildflowers—poppies, and the remainder bare dirt. AREA B (never grazed) = 44% weed grasses, 41% native grasses—Bromus, 3% broadleaf weeds and the remainder bare dirt. AREA C = 72% weed grasses, 3% native grasses—Bromus, and 25% bare soil. AREA D (not grazed in 2020) = 97% weed grasses and 3% native grasses—Bromus.

As a comparison to the decades of work being done at Arana Gulch, only five miles south at 300 Byers Lane in La Selva Beach on 70 acres of private property—the same area and habitat as the Arana Gulch property—the native grassland habitat at Byers Lane, started as 99% weed-covered, and was restored back to 95% native cover in only ten years.

The Arana Gulch restoration methods tried so far, are burning, grazing annually with cattle, and scraping. Three of the four former plant population "Areas" are surrounded by permanent barbed wire cattle fencing

The "Tarplant Hill" population in Watsonville (part of the Unit I populations) has experienced an almost identical drop in the plant numbers in that population. The plant count in 1984, estimated 10,000 plants, 1985 100,000 plants, 1986 20,000 plants, 1989 400,000 plants, and in 1990, 38,000 plants were estimated. Then in 1993, 1994, and 2003 only a single plant was found for that whole "Tarplant Hill" population. Then, counts in 2004, found 8 plants, 2005 60 plants, 2008 two plants, 2007 70 plants, 2008 59 plants, and the 2009 count found 189 plants.

The Twin Lakes population, which is part of Unit D is on State Park property, and the naturally occurring plant numbers were 16 in 1999, 7 in 2000, 19 in 2001, 7 in 2002 and only 5 plants in 2003.

== East Bay population review ==
A 2020 review of the East Bay populations, outlined the history and current status of the tarplants in that area. In the 1980s, the land where the wild population was growing, was the site of a future shopping mall. A project spearheaded by Neil Havlik, collected seeds and planted them for two years, into more than 30 sites, at Sobrante Ridge Regional Preserve, Tilden and Wildcat Regional Parks, and also, properties owned by East Bay Municipal Utility District. These populations only continue to grow currently in three locations, all of which are within Wildcat Canyon, and the largest stand is along the Mezue trail.

== Arana Gulch population studies ==
The entire Arana Gulch wild population dropped to a single plant in October 2020, in "Area A", the last of the four original "areas" where 100,000 plants were originally found growing 35 years earlier.

January, 2021, the City of Santa Cruz Parks & Recreation Department's Open Space & Greenways team, in collaboration with the Arana Gulch Adaptive Management Working Group, the UCSC Greenhouse, and UCSC volunteers, did an experimental outplanting of 400 Santa Cruz tar plant, to try and ensure its persistence as a key goal of the Arana Gulch management plan. An additional 400 tarplants were scheduled to be planted in February. The short-term goal of this experimental outplanting is to identify the best outplanting methods. The long-term goal is to increase the seedbank of the tarplant at Arana to a level that will ensure a high probability of persistence for 100 years, or in perpetuity. This planting is something of a landmark—if successful could potentially exceed the targeted population goal for the Santa Cruz tarplant management program.

Also in 2021, four studies were conducted of the Arana Gulch Critical Habitat Unit, where in the 1990s tarplants were divided into four population clusters--"Areas" A, B, C and D. Areas A, C and D have been grazed for several years, with the hopes that would increase the tarplant population. Instead, the tarplant population dropped to zero in two of the last six years, and only one single plant survived in 2020.

These studies were conducted, to determine the health of the Coastal Prairie habitat which the tarplant is a member, and what improvements could be made to produce future self-sustaining populations.

Study 1: How many exotic seeds are in the soil, that could potentially interfere with tarplant seedling survival? One square foot boxes were filled with topsoil, three inches deep from the four "Areas" in November 2021, and sown with California poppy seeds as a native plant stand-in for tarplant seeds, and watered daily. As seedlings germinated, they were identified and counted. Weed seedling counts indicate that tarplants have a massive amount of weed competition, with 129-516 weed grass seedlings sprouting in each box, that overwhelmed and killed all of the poppy seedlings that sprouted.

Three different soil samples were taken from Area A, plus one sample from each of Areas B, C and D. The number of weed grass seedlings that sprouted per square foot were: Area A = 129–374. Area B = 451. Area C = 464. Area D = 516. The broadleaf weed seedlings were also an important issue: Area A = 8–17. Area B = 29. Area C = 45. Area D = 33 per square foot.

Study 2: Has cattle grazing over time, remove soil nutrients that tarplant seedlings need for survival? Wood boxes, one square foot each, were filled with topsoil and poppy seeds sown as a stand-in for the tarplants, and all other seedlings as they sprouted removed, leaving the poppy seedlings to grow unmolested. However, the poppy seedlings soon showed they were nutrient-starved by their lack of growth and leaf-color. Organic fertilizers and organic matter were added periodically, until the plants started to thrive.

Study 3: Is there a connection between where wild tarplants grew in the past, with the percentage of Coastal Prairie cover in Area-A? Locations in Area A where wild tarplants grew over the past 25 years had been previously mapped. Sixteen linear vegetation-cover transects were run for 200 feet in slices 25 feet apart across those wild tarplant locations, and 20 x 25 foot polygons were produced from two-foot apart sampling points. Overlaying the location of wild tarplant on top of the vegetation cover survey, found that the tarplants at Arana Gulch seem to need a high quality Coastal Prairie matrix to maintain a self-sustaining population, that is approximately 80-95% native grass cover, consisting of a 60% Danthonia-30% Stipa-10% native Bromus species mix.

Study 4: Tarplant seedlings planted out, what genetic diversity exists in the Arana Gulch population? Spring 2021, UCSC-greenhouse grown seedlings, sprouted from originally wild-harvested Arana Gulch seeds, were planted out in Area-A. Photographed in June, 2021, showed that there were at least twelve different forms of the tarplant seedlings—from plants with widespread branches, to round compact shapes, and each flowering at slightly different times and in different manners. Since all of the seedlings were grown from seeds originally collected from wild plants at Arana Gulch, this planting acted as a perfect "common garden" study, to detect genetic variations within the population.

== See also ==
- California coastal prairie
