= Isla Rasa =

Island in the Gulf of California

- Location within Mexico

Geography
- Location: Gulf of California
- Coordinates: 28°49′26.12″N 112°58′49.03″W
- Highest elevation: 10 m (30 ft)

Administration
- Mexico
- State: Baja California

Demographics
- Population: uninhabited

Ramsar Wetland
- Designated: 2 February 2006
- Reference no.: 1603

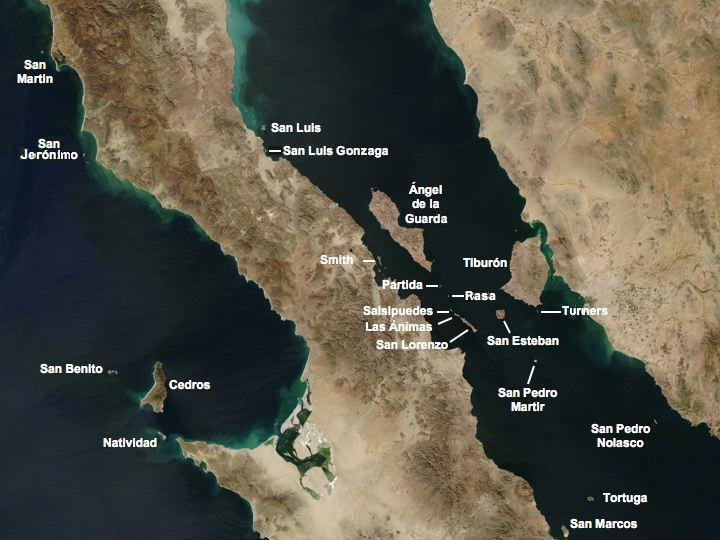
Northern middle part of the peninsula, showing the islands of the gulf and some of the Pacific.

Isla Rasa is an island in the Gulf of California east of the Baja California Peninsula. The island is uninhabited and is part of the Mexicali Municipality. The 0.21 sq./mi island has three small ponds and has small shed located in the center of the island.

== Biology ==
Isla Rasa has three species of reptiles: Phyllodactylus nocticolus (peninsular leaf-toed gecko), Sauromalus hispidus (spiny chuckwalla), and Uta stansburiana (common side-blotched lizard).

Isla Rasa is also the primary nesting site for about 95% of the world's Heermann's gulls and elegant terns.
