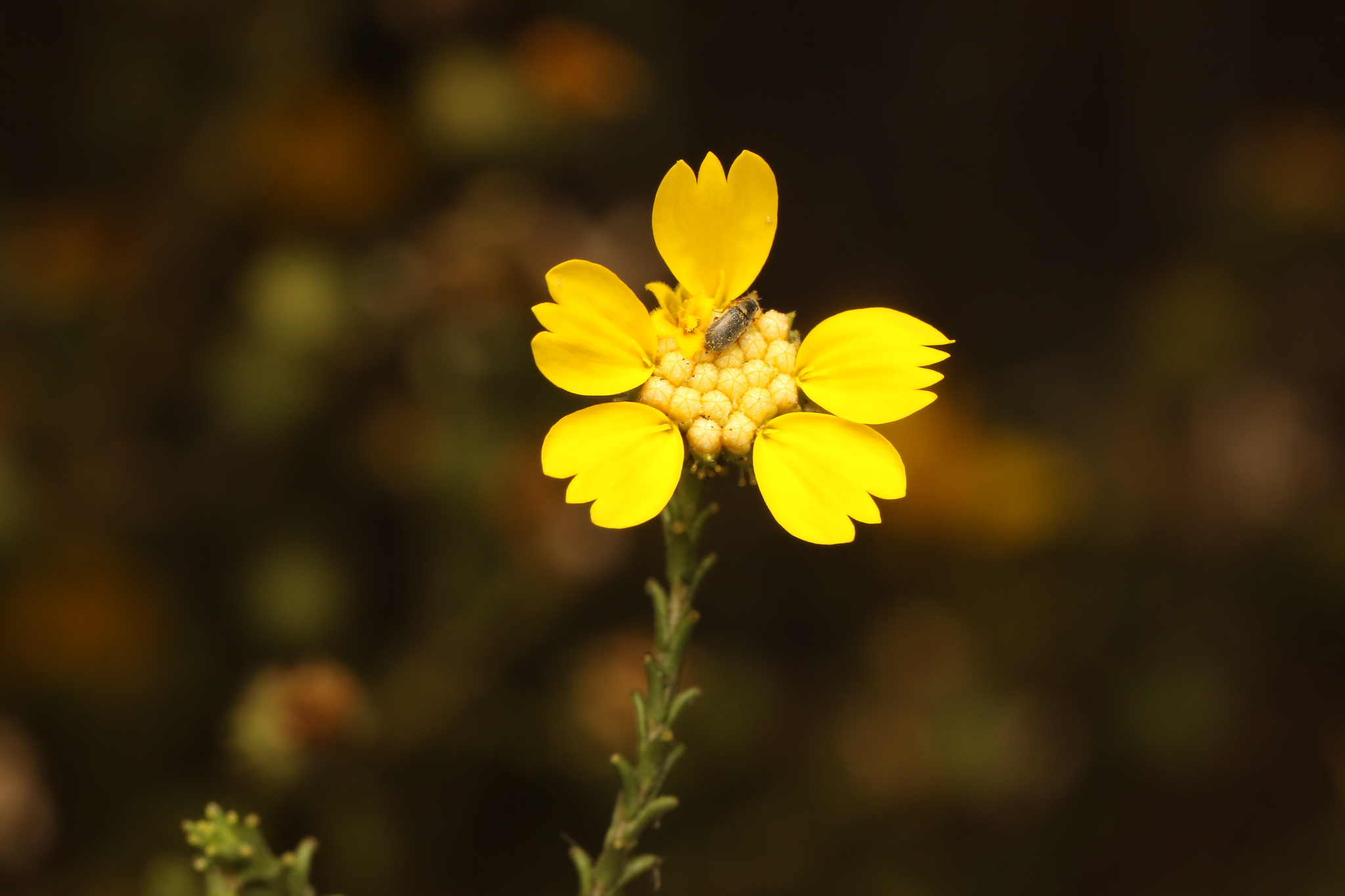

Scientific classification
- Kingdom: Plantae
- Clade: Tracheophytes
- Clade: Angiosperms
- Clade: Eudicots
- Clade: Asterids
- Order: Asterales
- Family: Asteraceae
- Genus: Holocarpha
- Species: H. obconica

Binomial name
- Holocarpha obconica (J.C.Clausen & D.D.Keck) D.D.Keck

Synonyms
- Hemizonia obconica J.C.Clausen & D.D.Keck; Hemizonia vernalis D.D.Keck; Holocarpha obconica subsp. autumnalis D.D.Keck

= Holocarpha obconica =

Species of flowering plant

Holocarpha obconica, commonly known as the San Joaquin tarweed, is a North American plant species in the sunflower family. It is endemic to (found only in) California, primarily in the Central Valley and adjacent regions.

The epithet "obconica" means "obconical," in other words, shaped like a cone, but with the widest part furthest from the base. Achenes of H. obconica are obconical. The plant is a resin-containing herb up to 120 cm (4 feet) tall. It produces numerous flower heads, each head containing 4–9 yellow ray flowers surrounding 11–21 small yellow disc flowers, the disc flowers having yellow or brown anthers.
