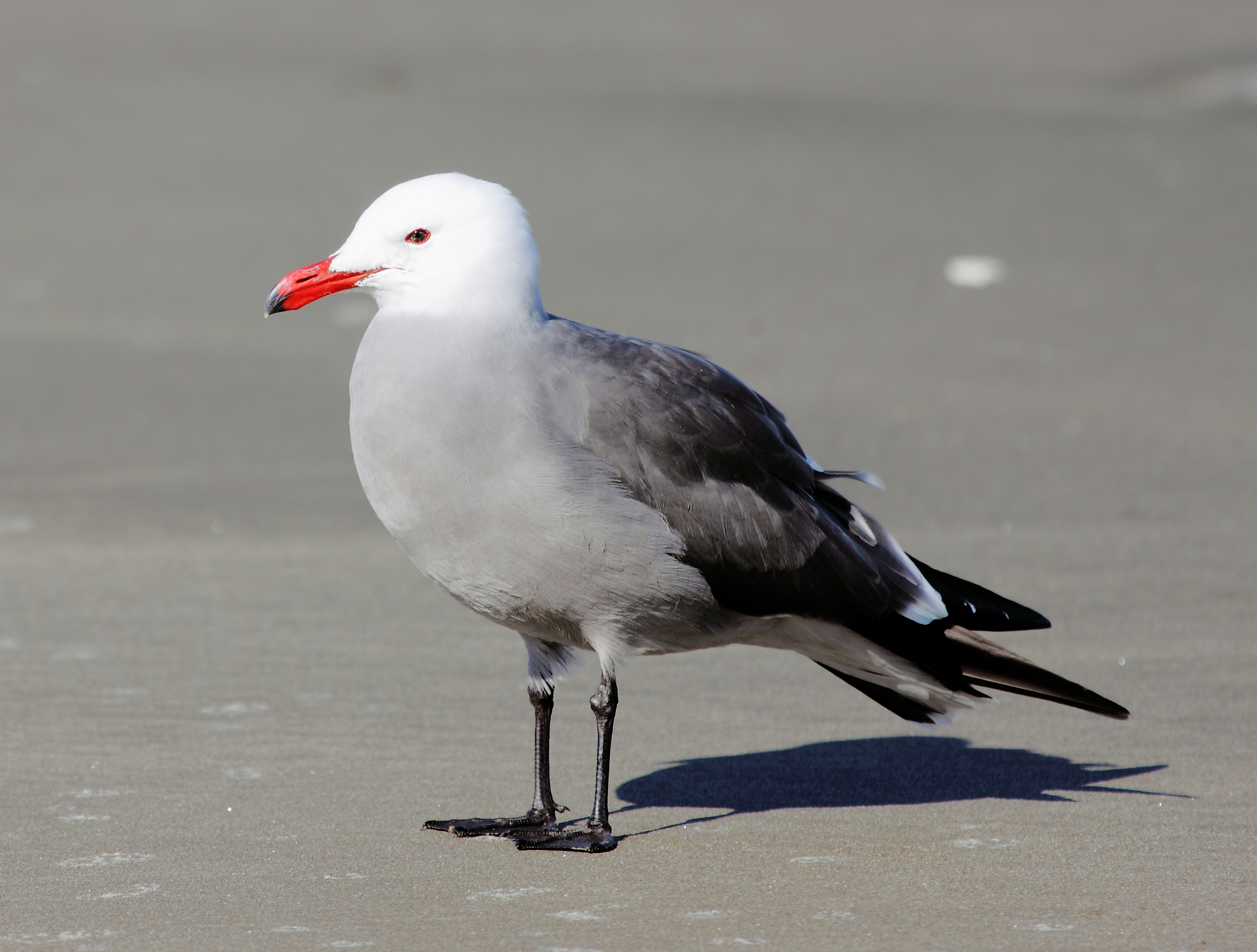
- Adult breeding
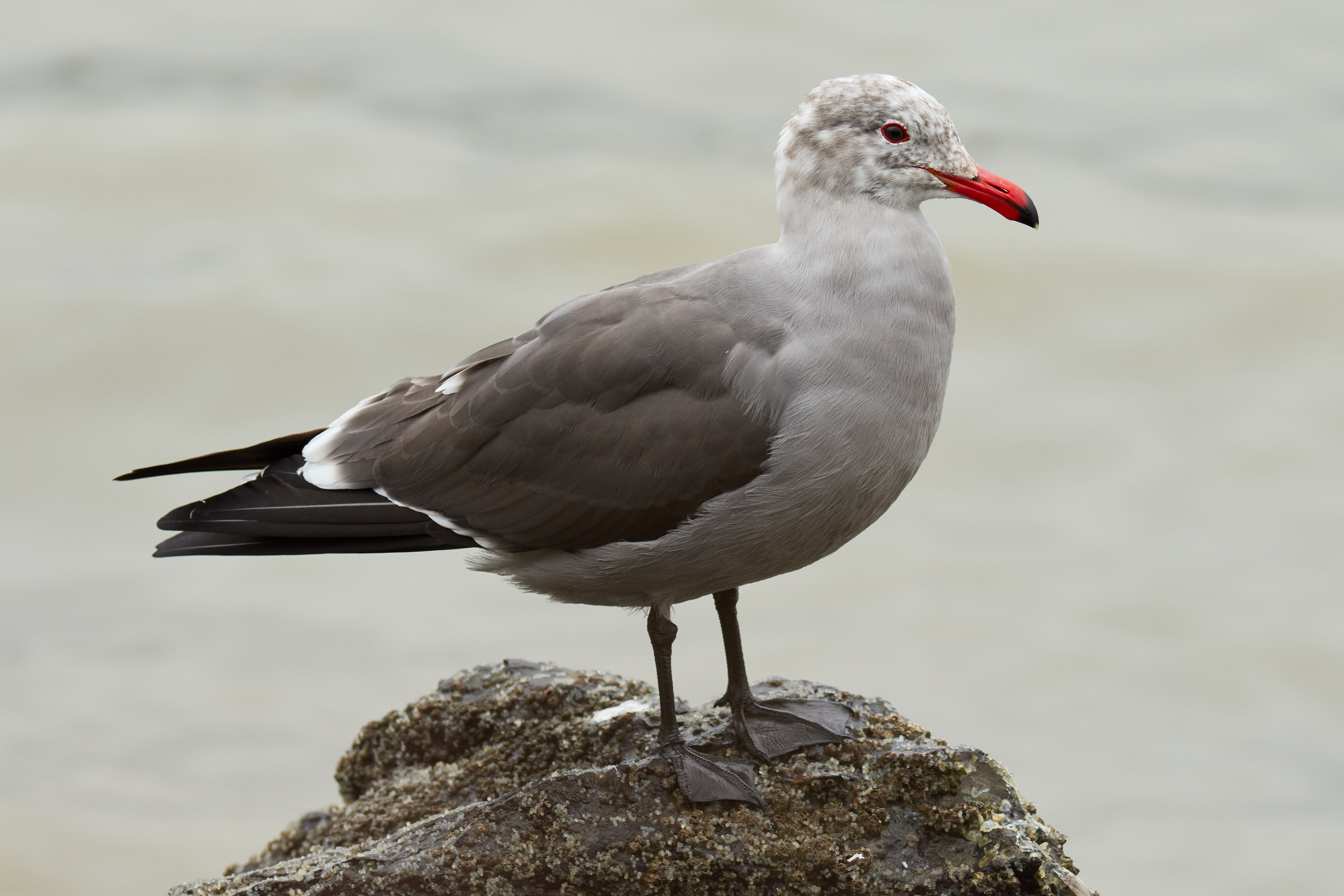
- Adult non-breeding

Conservation status
- Near Threatened (IUCN 3.1)

Scientific classification
- Kingdom: Animalia
- Phylum: Chordata
- Class: Aves
- Order: Charadriiformes
- Family: Laridae
- Genus: Larus
- Species: L. heermanni

Binomial name
- Larus heermanni Cassin, 1852
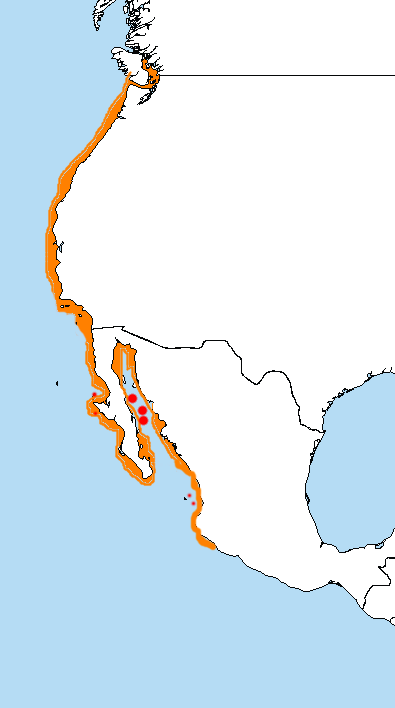
- Range of L. heermanni

= Heermann's gull =

Species of bird

Heermann's gull (Larus heermanni) is a gull resident in the United States, Mexico and extreme southwestern British Columbia, nearly all nesting on Isla Rasa in the Gulf of California. They are usually found near shores or well out to sea, very rarely inland. The species is named after Adolphus Lewis Heermann, nineteenth-century explorer and naturalist.

== Description ==
This species looks distinctly different from other gulls. Adults have a medium gray body, blackish-gray wings and tail with white edges, and a red bill with a black tip. The head is dusky gray in non-breeding plumage and white in breeding plumage. Immatures resemble non-breeding adults but are darker and browner, and the bill is pink till the second winter. A few birds, no more than 1 in 200, have white primary coverts, which form a showy spot on the upper wing. This gull is unlikely to be confused with other species as it is the only white-headed, gray-bodied gull found on the west coast of North America.

Calls are described as deep and similar in pattern to other gulls but is noticeably different in quality.

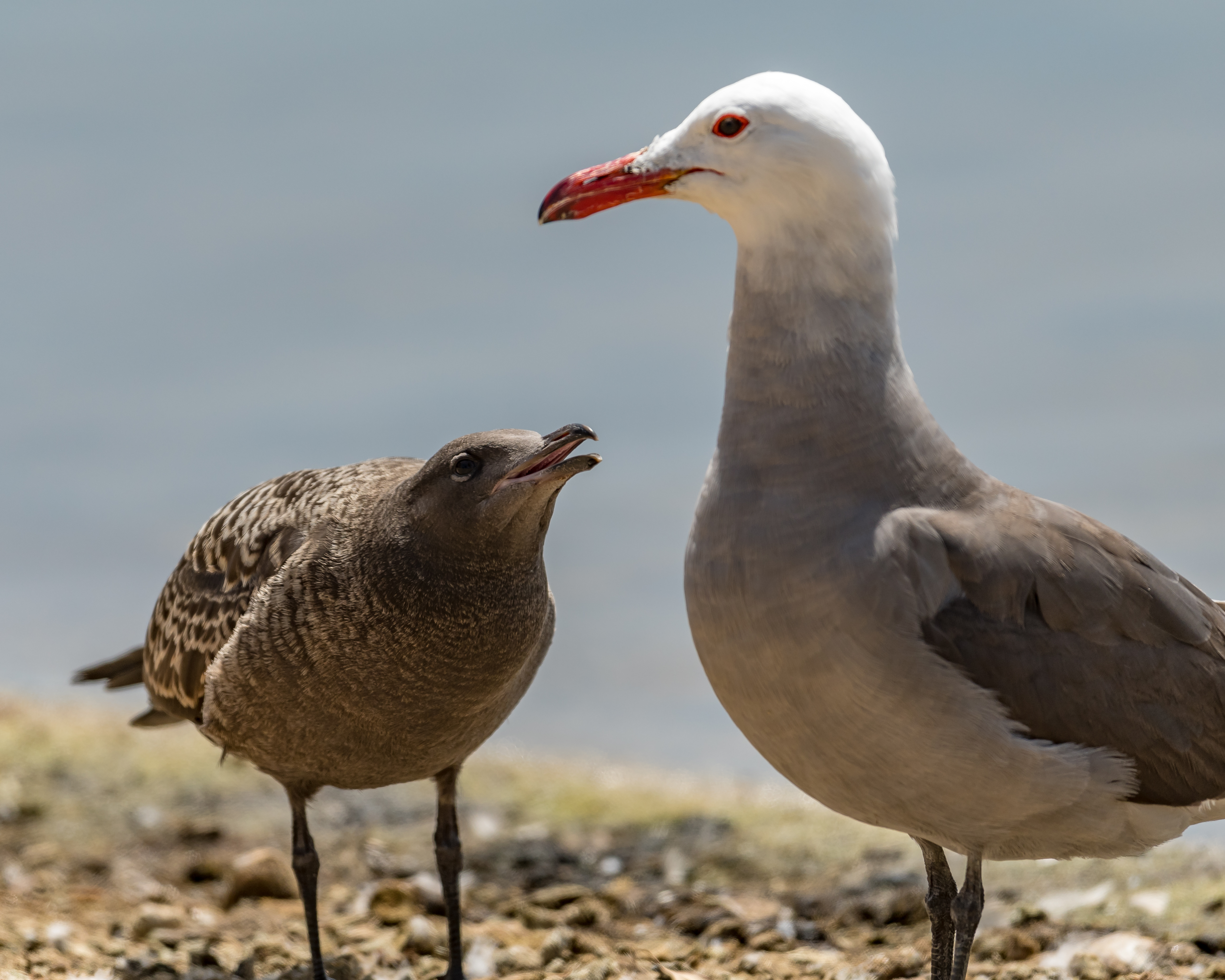
Adult and fledgling, Seaside, California

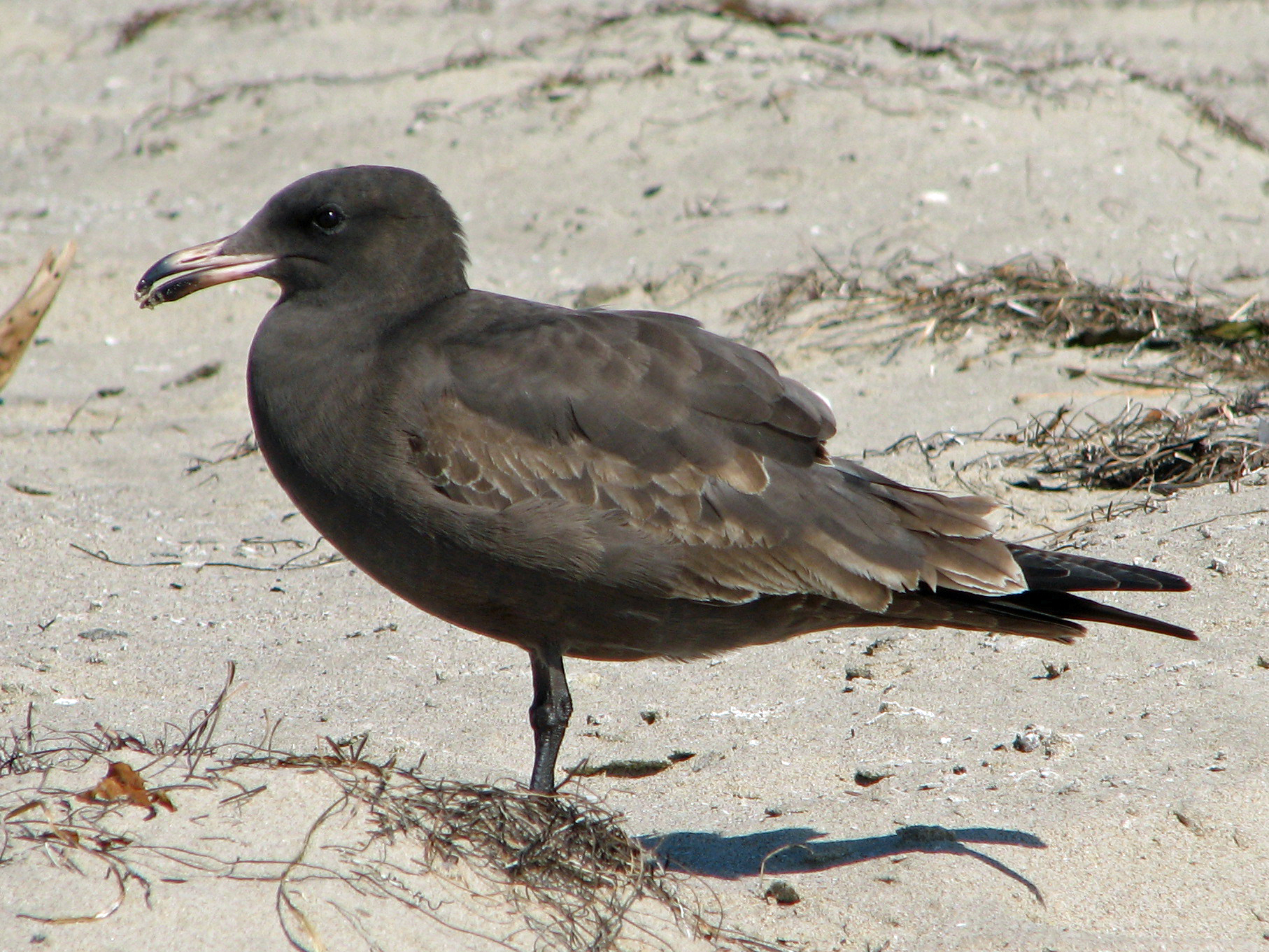
Juvenile, California

non-breeding plumage, Salish Sea, WA

== Distribution ==
Of the current population of about 150,000 pairs, 90% nest on the island of Isla Rasa off Baja California in the Gulf of California, with smaller colonies as far north as California and as far south as Nayarit. After breeding, birds commonly disperse to central California, and less commonly north as far as British Columbia and south as far as Guatemala. Some birds exhibit strong site fidelity to their nonbreeding territories, including a one-legged gull who resided for 17 years at the Loch Lomond Marina in San Rafael, California.The only known active breeding colony of Heermann's gull in the continental United States is located in Seaside, California, when a small number of gulls were observed nesting on artificial fill islands on Roberts Lake as of 1999. After the islands eroded away by 2007, the colony continued to nest on nearby rooftops. In June 2018, one of the colony's main nesting sites, the Seaside McDonald's, was destroyed by a drunk driving crash. In April 2019, after obtaining a permit from the City of Seaside, the Monterey Audubon Society deployed a floating artificial nesting island in Roberts Lake in an effort to restore nesting territory to the colony.

== Diet ==
Heermann's gull eats small fish, marine invertebrates, lizards, insects, and carrion.

== Behavior ==
This species nests colonially on the ground, like many gulls. The nests are often at densities as high as 110 nests per 100 m^{2} (1,100 sq ft). It lays two or three eggs, grayish buff, to buff with gray and brown markings.

Heermann's gull sometimes steals prey from other seabirds, particularly brown pelicans, with which it often associates.

== Status ==
Isla Rasa was declared a sanctuary in 1964. Egg-collecting and disturbance during the breeding season are discouraged. With the breeding colony concentrated on one small island this species is vulnerable to a catastrophic weather event. The success of the colony in any one year is dependent on the availability of prey and this is related to the ocean temperature changes brought about by El Niño. These factors have caused the IUCN to rate this bird as "Near Threatened".

== Gallery ==
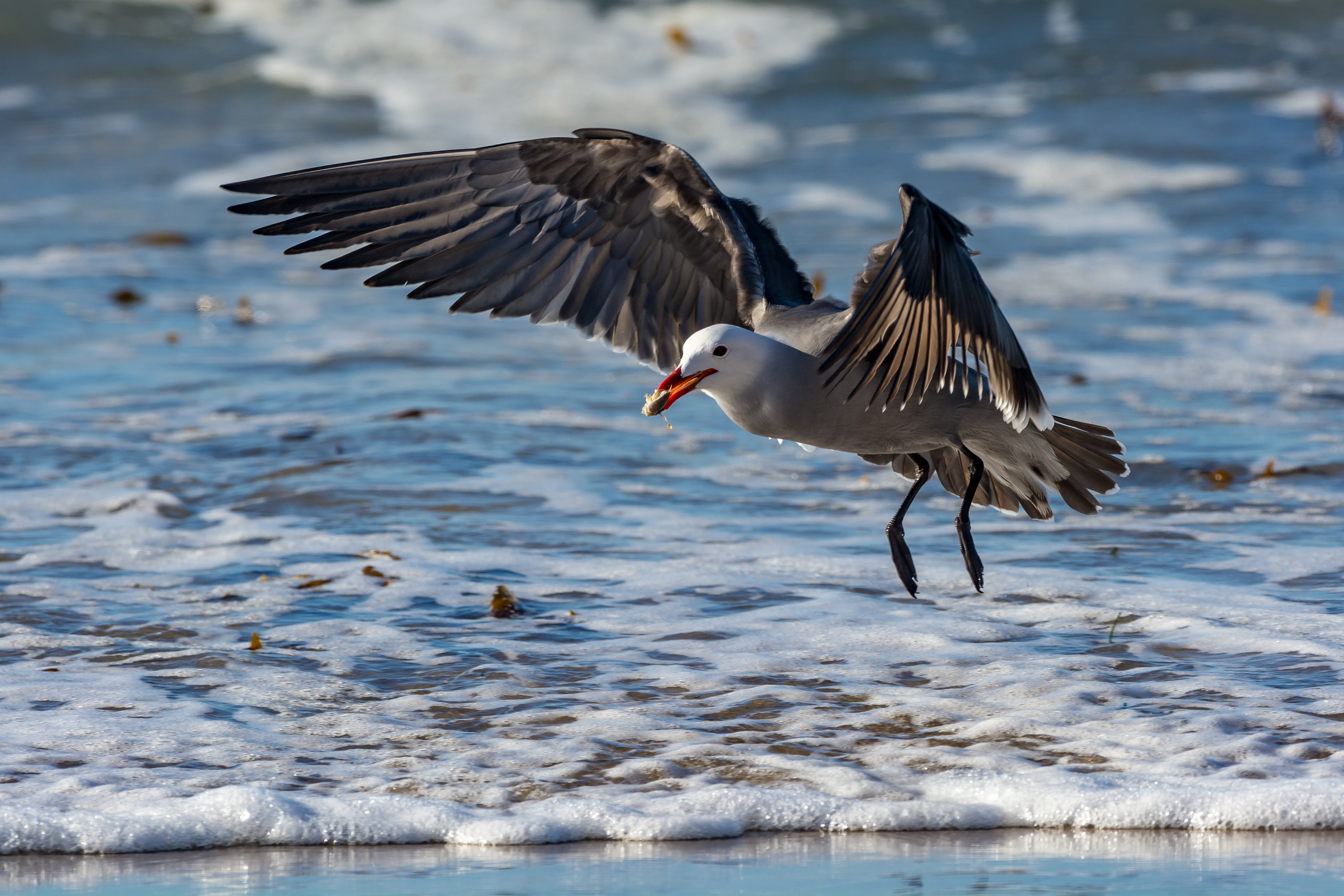
Adult Heermann's gull with sand crab on Del Monte Beach, Monterey, CA

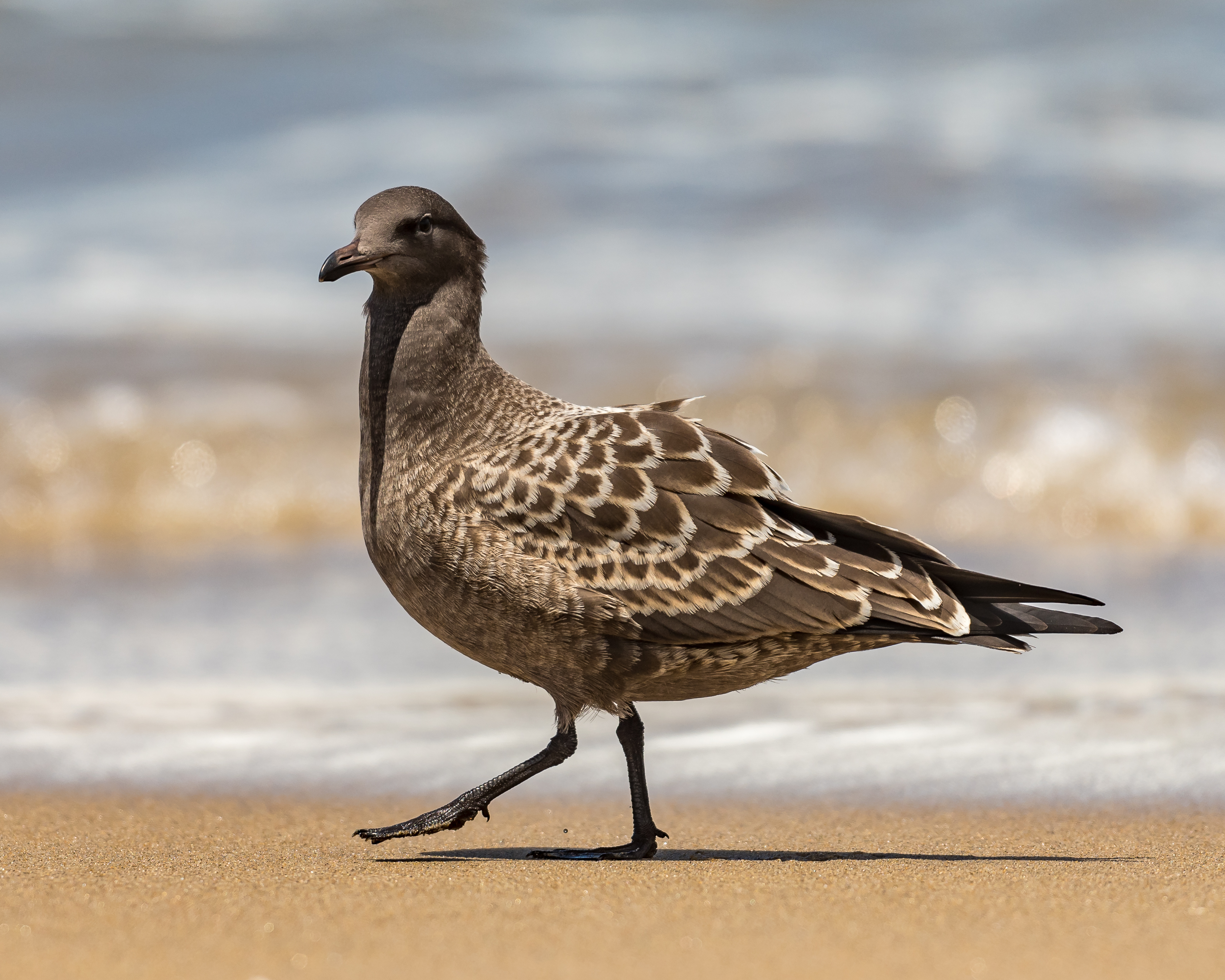
Heermann's gull fledgling from the Seaside colony foraging on Del Monte Beach, Monterey, CA

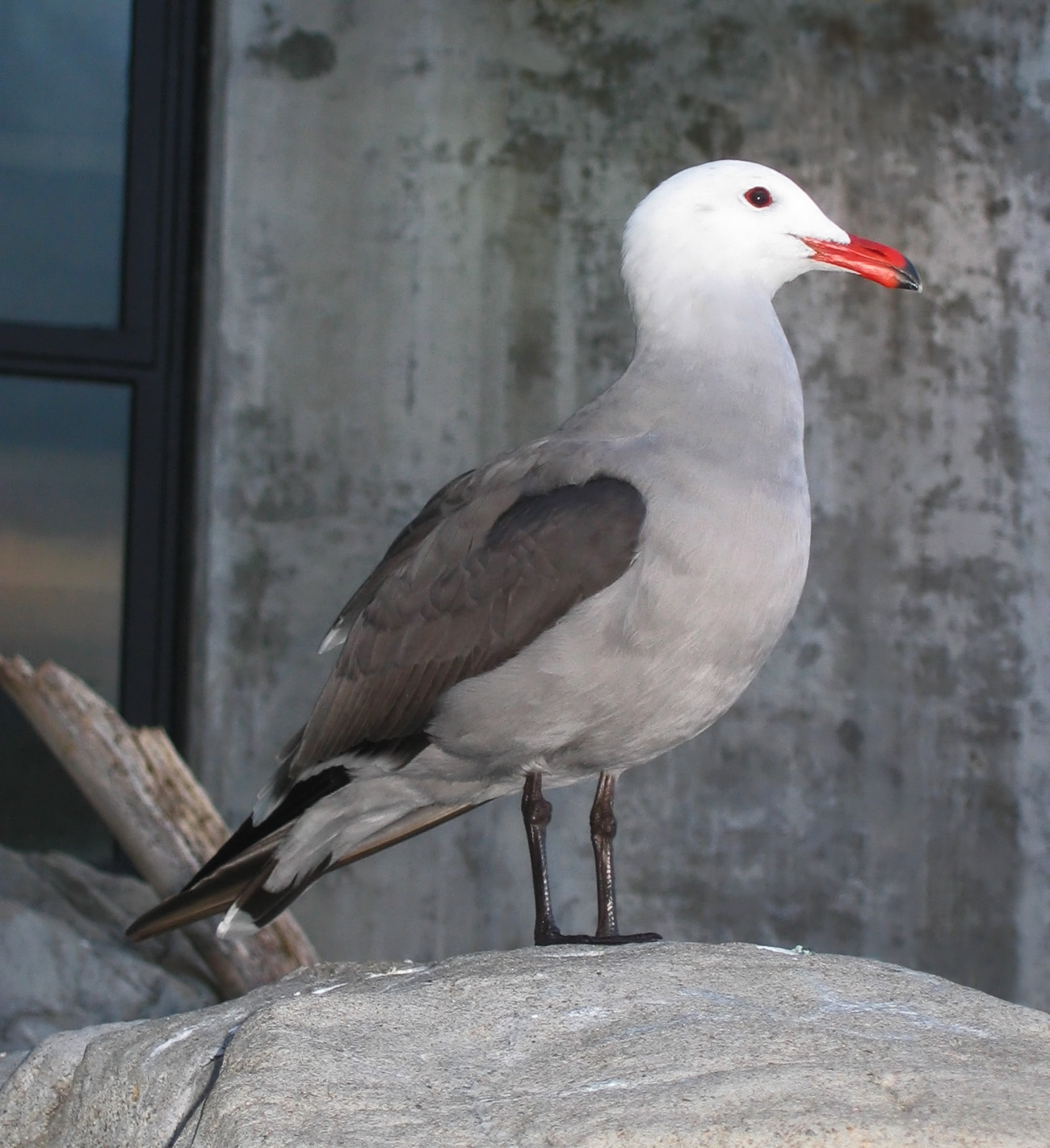
Adult Heermann's gull at the Monterey Bay Aquarium

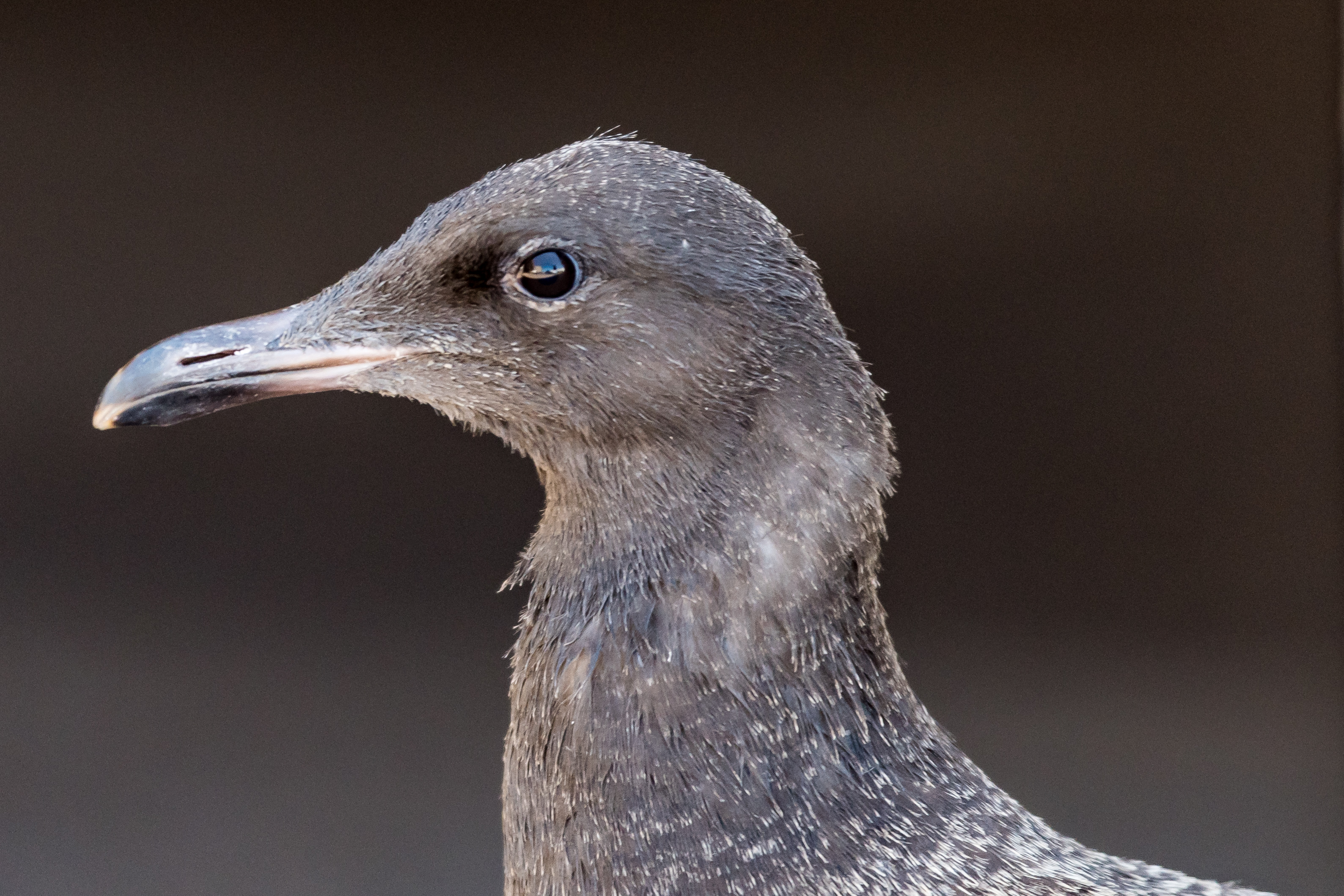
Fledgling Heermann's gull from the Seaside colony

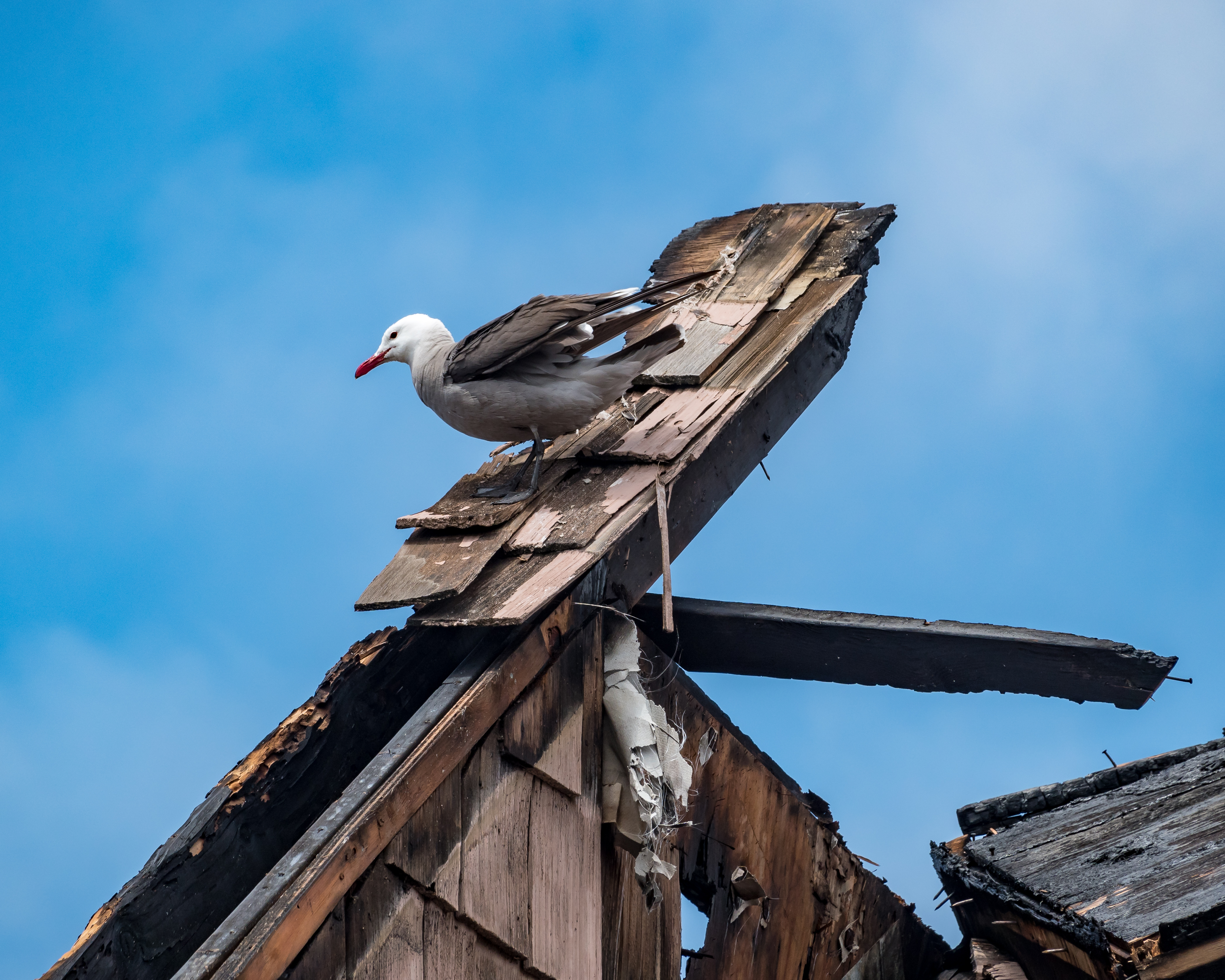
Adult Heermanns' gull from the Seaside colony searching for its nest atop the burned-out McDonald's

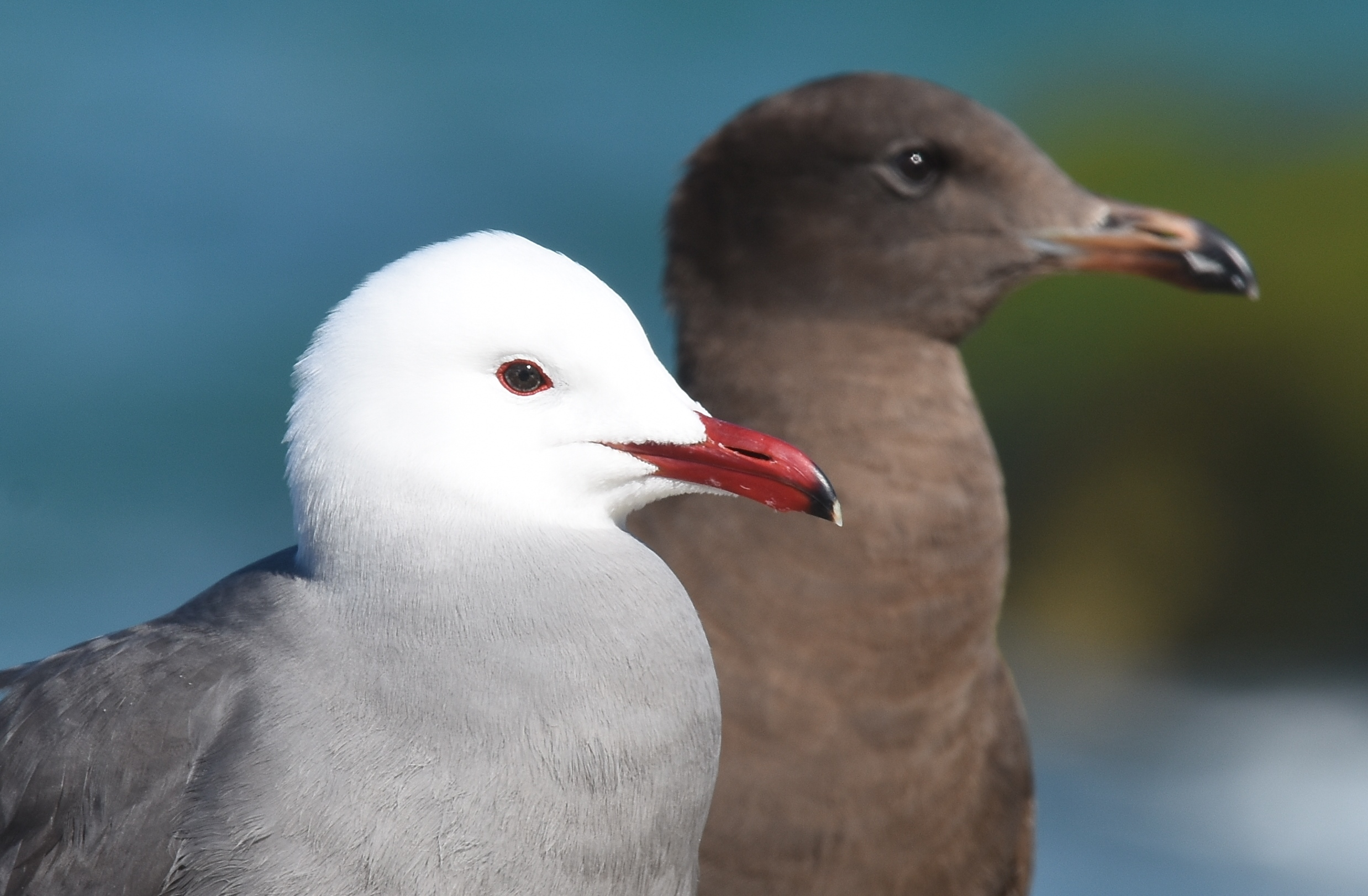
Adult with juvenile
