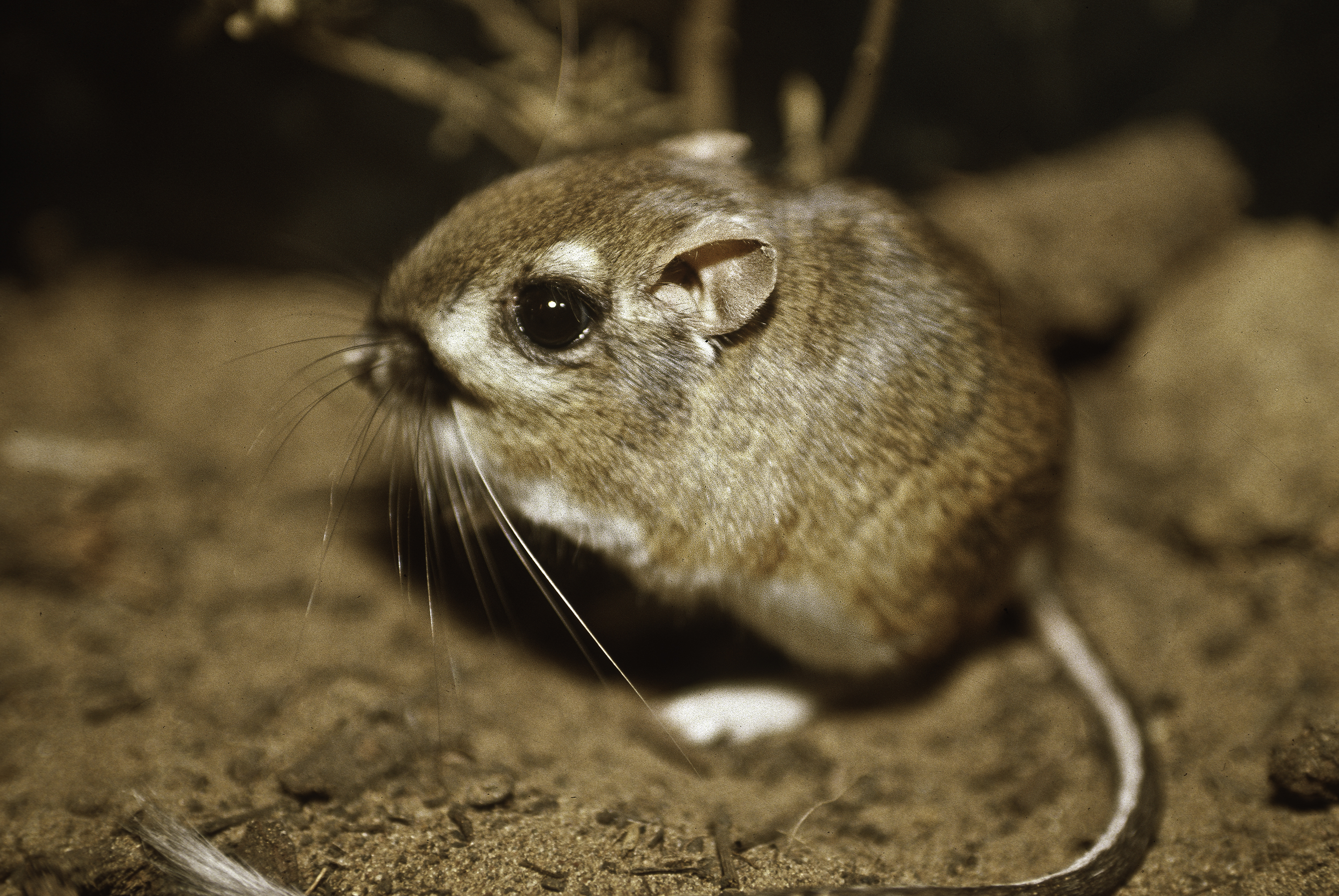

Conservation status
- Endangered (ESA)

Scientific classification
- Kingdom: Animalia
- Phylum: Chordata
- Class: Mammalia
- Order: Rodentia
- Family: Heteromyidae
- Genus: Dipodomys
- Species: D. heermanni
- Subspecies: D. h. morroensis

Trinomial name
- Dipodomys heermanni morroensis (Merriam, 1907)

= Morro Bay kangaroo rat =

Subspecies of rodent

The Morro Bay kangaroo rat (Dipodomys heermanni morroensis), is an endangered kangaroo rat, a rodent in the Heteromyidae family. The species is the smallest subspecies of the Heermann's kangaroo rat and is endemic to San Luis Obispo County, California.

== Distribution and habitat ==
The Heermann's kangaroo rat (Dipodomys heermanni) is found in warm and semi desert areas. The Morro Bay kangaroo rat (D. h. morroensis) subspecies is unique to Baywood fine sands, a soil type found in Morro Bay, Los Osos, and Montana de Oro State Park on the Central Coast of California. As a result, the Morro Bay kangaroo rat lives in a restricted 2 km area south of Morro Bay in San Luis Obispo County, California.

The burrows of the Morro Bay kangaroo rat enter the ground at an angle.

== Morphology ==
Like gerbils and pyramid rats, the Morro Bay kangaroo rats resemble little kangaroos, with well-developed hind limbs for jumping, short front limbs, and a long tail used for balance while leaping. Their ears are average in size and the hair on their backs varies between brown and yellow, while the hair on their bellies is white. As nocturnal animals, their eyes are very large. The Morro Bay kangaroo rat is 11 to 13 cm long and its tail measures between 16 and 19 cm. It weighs between 60 and 80 g.

The Morro Bay subspecies is the smallest of all subspecies. The male is measured to be 300.4 mm while the females are about 295.1 mm long.

== Behaviour ==
The primary food of Morro Bay kangaroo rats is seeds.

They have 2 to 3 litters a year. The amount of pups in the litter ranges from one to seven with the average being two. They are born with no hair, eyes, ears closed, and toothless.

== Endangered and missing ==
The Morro Bay kangaroo rat is federally endangered, due to extensive development in its habitat. As of 2023, despite numerous localized and range-wide surveys, the animal has not been detected by any of these analyses and has remained unseen since 1986.
