= Brachycoryna melsheimeri =

Scientific classification
- Kingdom: Animalia
- Phylum: Arthropoda
- Clade: Pancrustacea
- Class: Insecta
- Order: Coleoptera
- Suborder: Polyphaga
- Infraorder: Cucujiformia
- Family: Chrysomelidae
- Genus: Brachycoryna
- Species: B. melsheimeri

Binomial name
- Brachycoryna melsheimeri (Crotch, 1873)

Synonyms
- Microrhopala melsheimeri Crotch, 1873

Species of beetle

Brachycoryna melsheimeri is a species of leaf beetle in the family Chrysomelidae. It can be found in North America, where it has been recorded from Alabama, Arkansas, the District of Columbia, Illinois, Louisiana, Michigan, Missouri, North Carolina, Ohio, Oklahoma, Pennsylvania, South Carolina, Tennessee, Texas and Virginia.

== Description ==
Adults reach a length of about 2.5-3.3 mm. They have a black head and the pronotum is reddish-yellow or yellowish-red usually with black markings. The elytron is reddish-yellow with black markings.

== Biology ==
The foodplant is unknown, but adults have been collected on Erigeron species.
