= Berkeley kangaroo rat =

Scientific classification
- Kingdom: Animalia
- Phylum: Chordata
- Class: Mammalia
- Order: Rodentia
- Family: Heteromyidae
- Genus: Dipodomys
- Species: D. heermanni
- Subspecies: D. h. berkeleyensis

Trinomial name
- Dipodomys heermanni berkeleyensis Grinnell, 1922

Extinct species of rodent

The Berkeley kangaroo rat (Dipodomys heermanni berkeleyensis) is a presumed extinct subspecies of Heermann's kangaroo rat (Dipodomys heermanni), which is endemic to California. The subspecies was first described by Joseph Grinnell in 1922 from specimens collected in the Berkeley Hills region of Alameda County. Only about twenty individuals have ever been confirmed, with the last verified specimen collected in 1940 at Calaveras Reservoir in the East Bay Hills.

Although historically recognized as distinct based on coloration and cranial morphology, recent molecular and morphological analyses have not supported its status as a unique subspecies. The Berkeley kangaroo rat remains of conservation interest due to its uncertain taxonomic validity and historical range in the East Bay region.

== Taxonomy and history ==
The Berkeley kangaroo rat is one of nine recognized subspecies within Dipodomys heermanni. The taxon was first described by Joseph Grinnell from four specimens collected in the Berkeley Hills area. Grinnell distinguished the form primarily on the basis of darker coat coloration and specific cranial proportions.

Originally regarded as a potential full species within either Dipodomys or Perodipis, D. h. berkeleyensis has since been maintained as a subspecific designation. Earlier examinations of karyotypic variation among D. heermanni subspecies did not include D.h. berkeleyensis, and its taxonomic position remained uncertain for decades.

Comprehensive phylogeographic assessments have been done that found no substantial genetic or morphological support for the distinctiveness of D. h. berkeleyensis. As a result, the recognition of the subspecies has been questioned.

== Description ==
The Berkeley kangaroo rat is a medium-sized subspecies distinguished by its broad face and five-toed hind feet. The type specimen measured approximately 301 mm (12 in) in total length, with a hind foot length of 41 mm (1.7 in) and a body weight of 77 g (2.7 oz).

Grinnell's original 1922 description characterized adult D. h. berkeleyensis as having:

- A dark coat overall, with bold facial markings.
- A dorsal tail stripe that was black and at least as wide as the adjacent white stripes.
- A distinct white flank stripe and cinnamon-buff to darker dorsal coloration.
- A heavily crested tail with terminal hairs exceeding 20 mm in length.
- A skull breadth across bullae of approximately 23.6 - 24.3 mm, and nasal length greater than 14 mm.

Compared to the closely related Tulare kangaroo rat (D. h. tularensis), the Berkeley subspecies was described as having darker fur, broader dark stripes along the body and tail, and smaller patches of pale hairs on the ears and face.

== Distribution and habitat ==
Dipodomys heermanni is endemic to California, primarily occupying dry, gravelly grasslands and open chaparral habitats. Specimens attributed to D. h. berkeleyensis were collected from Alameda County and Contra Costa County in the East Bay region.

Historical field notes suggest that the subspecies inhabited bare ridge lines, rocky outcrops, thin soils, and scattered chaparral interspersed with small annual grasses. A 2004 specimen from Alameda County was identified by mammalogist William Lidicker as a potential representative of the Berkeley subspecies based on collection locality and morphology, although genetic confirmation was not obtained.

== Natural history and records ==
The first recorded Berkeley kangaroo rat was reportedly captured in 1918 by a domestic cat near Dwight Way Hill in Berkeley. The specimen was delivered to Joseph Grinnell, then director of the Museum of Vertebrate Zoology at the University of California, Berkeley, who subsequently described the subspecies.

Approximately twenty confirmed specimens were collected between 1918 and 1940 from isolated localities in the East Bay Hills. The final verified record dates to 1940 from the Calaveras Reservoir area. Due to limited specimen availability, little is known about the ecology, behavior, or precise habitat preferences of the animal.

== Research ==
Between 2000 and 2005, several kangaroo rat specimens were captured in Alameda County. Hair and skin samples from these individuals were later analyzed to assess the phylogeographic structure of D. heermanni.

A total of 16 samples were assigned to D. h. berkeleyensis:

- Fresh tissues (n = 11) were collected from localities in Alameda Country, including the Haera property, Haera Wildlife Conservation bank, Ohlone Regional Wilderness, Ohlone-West Conservation Bank, and Ohlone Preserve.
- Ancient tissues (n = 5) were obtained from Alameda and Contra Costa counties.

Morphological data were available for 14 cranial specimens, one of which was the type specimen.

== Phylogeographic and morphological findings ==
The phylogeographic assessment by Benedict and colleagues (2018, 2019) combined molecular and geometric morphometric analyses across the full range of D. heermanni subspecies. Results indicated:

- No significant genetic differentiation between D. h. berkeleyensis and other subspecies.
- No significant genetic differentiation between D. h. berkeleyensis and other subspecies.
- Rejection of monophyly for D. h. berkeleyensis and for all other subspecies in phylogenetic constraint analyses.

In discriminant function analyses (DFA) based on cranial geometry, the model correctly classified D. h. Berkeleyensis specimens with 42.9% accuracy for the dorsal view and 64.3% for the ventral view, suggesting limited morphological distinctiveness.

Across seven molecular datasets, haplotypes attributed to D. h. berkeleyensis were frequently shared with other D. heermanni subspecies, including D. h. tularensis and D. h. Morroensis.

These results suggest that the current taxonomy of D. heermanni may not represent genetically or morphologically distinct evolutionary lineages.

== Conservation status ==
The Berkeley kangaroo rat is currently regarded as presumed extinct, though occasional unconfirmed reports persist. It is not listed under state or federal endangered species legislation but is recognized as a special-status species by the U.S. Fish and Wildlife Service and appears in the California State Wildlife Action Plan as a species of special concern.

The U.S. Fish and Wildlife Service Draft Recovery Plan (2002) for chaparral and scrub species east of San Francisco Bay designates D. h. berkeleyensis as a "no take" species under the Alameda Watershed Habitat Conservation Plan, though no active protections are currently enforced due to the lack of confirmed populations.

The immediate goal outlined in the recovery plan is to confirm the subspecies' status, and if extant populations are rediscovered, to pursue long-term conservation and threat reduction measures.

== Threats and decline ==
The decline of the Berkeley kangaroo rat has been attributed primarily to urban development in the East Bay hills, which led to widespread habitat loss and fragmentation. Domestic and feral cats are also believed to have posed a significant threat, particularly during the early 20th century when the species' range overlapped with growing human settlements.

== Search efforts and possible rediscoveries ==
Beginning in the 1980s, biologist Gary Beeman conducted targeted searches in the East Bay hills, reporting several unconfirmed sightings. Other anecdotal accounts include a possible capture near Mount Diablo and a specimen reportedly taken by a cat in the 1990s, but none were accompanied by photographic or genetic verification.

Since 2000, Joe DiDonato of the East Bay Regional Park District has trapped several kangaroo rats showing intermediate features between D. h. berkeleyensis and D. h. tularensis. Genetic testing has been proposed to determine whether these individuals represent surviving Berkeley kangaroo rats or hybrids.

== Conservation implications ==
Because recent analyses found limited genetic or morphological divergence among D. heermanni subspecies, researchers have suggested that reintroductions of D. heermanni individuals into the former range of D. h. berkeleyensis could help restore lost ecological functions, even if the subspecies itself is no longer extant.
