= Brachycoryna hardyi =

Scientific classification
- Kingdom: Animalia
- Phylum: Arthropoda
- Clade: Pancrustacea
- Class: Insecta
- Order: Coleoptera
- Suborder: Polyphaga
- Infraorder: Cucujiformia
- Family: Chrysomelidae
- Genus: Brachycoryna
- Species: B. hardyi

Binomial name
- Brachycoryna hardyi (Crotch, 1874)

Synonyms
- Odontota hardyi Crotch, 1874; Microrhopala melsheimeri Crotch, Gemminger & Harold, 1876; Brachycoryna horni Weise, 1905; Brachycoryna confusa Hatch, 1971

Species of beetle

Brachycoryna hardyi is a species of leaf beetle in the family Chrysomelidae. It is found in Central America and North America, where it has been recorded from Canada (Alberta, British Columbia), the United States (Arizona, California, Idaho, Nevada, Oregon, Utah, Washington) and Mexico (Baja California).

== Description ==
Adults reach a length of about 2.5-3.7 mm. They have a black head and the pronotum is reddish-yellow sometimes with dark markings. The elytron is either reddish-yellow with dark markings or black with reddish markings.

== Biology ==
This species has been found feeding on Ceanothus lucodermis, Ceanothus sanguineus and Ceanothus velutinus.
