= Brachycoryna notaticeps =

Scientific classification
- Kingdom: Animalia
- Phylum: Arthropoda
- Clade: Pancrustacea
- Class: Insecta
- Order: Coleoptera
- Suborder: Polyphaga
- Infraorder: Cucujiformia
- Family: Chrysomelidae
- Genus: Brachycoryna
- Species: B. notaticeps

Binomial name
- Brachycoryna notaticeps Pic, 1928

Synonyms
- Microrhopala notaticeps Horn, 1883

Species of beetle

Brachycoryna notaticeps is a species of beetle of the family Chrysomelidae. It is found in Argentina, Bolivia and Paraguay.

== Description ==
Adults reach a length of about 2.58-3.43 mm. They have a black head, while the pronotum is yellow with a black apical margin. The elytron has scattered brown markings.

== Biology ==
The foodplant is unknown, but adults have been collected from Sphaeralcea species.
