= Brachycoryna longula =

Scientific classification
- Kingdom: Animalia
- Phylum: Arthropoda
- Clade: Pancrustacea
- Class: Insecta
- Order: Coleoptera
- Suborder: Polyphaga
- Infraorder: Cucujiformia
- Family: Chrysomelidae
- Genus: Brachycoryna
- Species: B. longula

Binomial name
- Brachycoryna longula Weise, 1907

Species of beetle

Brachycoryna longula is a species of leaf beetle in the family Chrysomelidae. It is found in Central America and North America, where it has been recorded from the United States (Arizona, California, Nevada) and Mexico (Baja California).

== Description ==
Adults reach a length of about 2.25-3.1 mm. They have a dark metallic green head and the pronotum is yellow with a black line and sometimes other brownish-yellow markings. The elytron is reddish-yellow or yellow with brownish-yellow markings.

== Biology ==
The foodplant is unknown, but adults have been collected on Hymenoclea monogyra, Ambrosia dumosa and Mimosa pigra.
