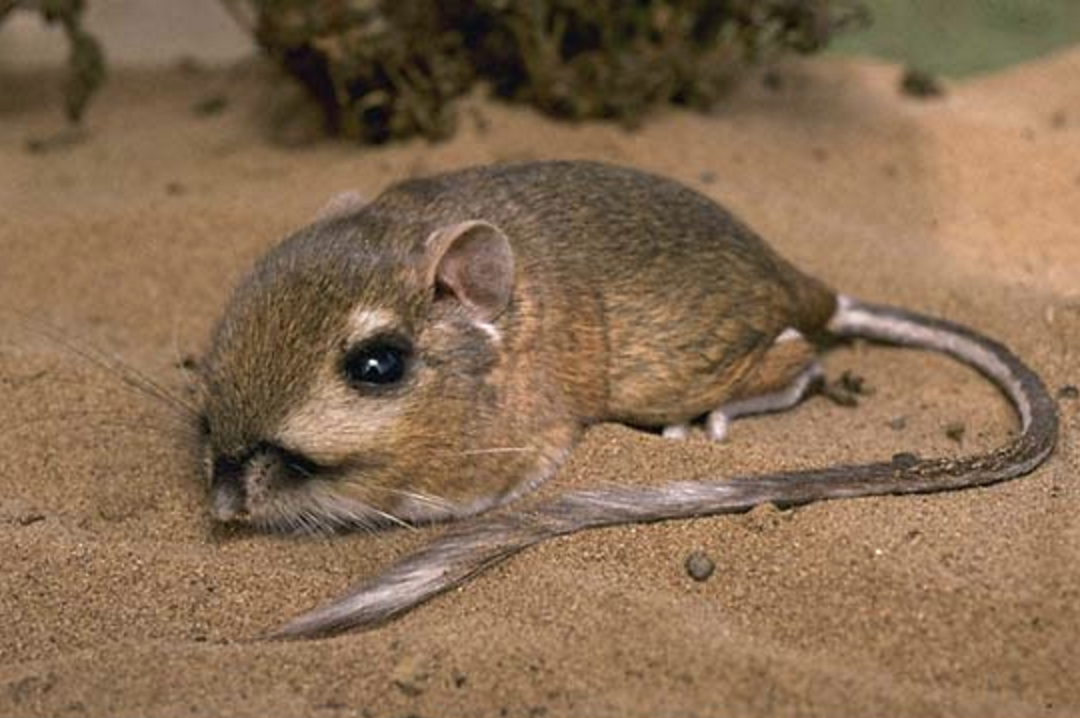

Conservation status
- Least Concern (IUCN 3.1)

Scientific classification
- Kingdom: Animalia
- Phylum: Chordata
- Class: Mammalia
- Order: Rodentia
- Family: Heteromyidae
- Genus: Dipodomys
- Species: D. heermanni

Binomial name
- Dipodomys heermanni Le Conte, 1853
- IUCN Red List range map for Dipodomys heermanni, Version 2021-2

= Heermann's kangaroo rat =

Species of rodent

Heermann's kangaroo rat (Dipodomys heermanni) is a species of kangaroo rat, a rodent in the family Heteromyidae. Their long smooth pelage resembles typical kangaroo rats, with their dorsal side showing a mixed range of olive, black and orange colors. Nine different sub-species of Dipodomys heermanni have been proposed.

The dental formula of Dipodomys heermanni is 1.0.1.31.0.1.3 × 2 = 20.

It is considered "broad-faced", unlike many other species of kangaroo rats, which are considered to be "narrow-faced". It has five toes on each hind foot, and this small characteristic is important in distinguishing it from similar species such as Dipodomys californicus and Dipodomys nitratoides. Additionally it is smaller than Dipodomys ingens, Dipodomys venustus, and Dipodomys elephantinus.

Heermann's kangaroo rat averages a total length of 250–313 mm (9.8–12.3 in), with their tail measuring 160–200 mm (6.3–7.9 in), their hind foot measuring 38–46 mm (1.5–1.8 in), and their ear measuring 10–17 mm (0.39–0.67 in). Additionally when looking at all standard external measurements it has been found they demonstrate significant sexual dimorphism.

It is named after Adolphus Lewis Heermann, who collected the holotype of this species.

== Distribution ==
Dipodomys heermanni is endemic to California in the United States. The range is limited as well, extending north to south from Lake Tahoe to Point Conception in Santa Barbara County, and east to west from the Sierra Nevada mountain range to the Pacific Ocean. They can be found in a range of habitats, however they do not surpass the altitude of 910 m (3,000 ft). Even with this small home range, the Heermann's kangaroo rat is listed as a species of least concern according to the IUCN. According to USFWS the sub-species D.h. morroensis is listed as endangered.

== Habitat and population ==
With all the interconnected surface runways within a community composed of individual Heermann's kangaroo rats, it is incredibly difficult to narrow down individual home ranges. Because of this difficulty in distinguishing home ranges, the estimated values fluctuate greatly. In one study, more than half of all recaptured rats were found within 30.5 meters (100 ft) of their first capture. Home ranges can be very different from each other and can consist of differing levels of vegetation. Most common areas are on coastal plains or ridges with shallow soil.

Their general range spans between the Tehachapi mountains and the Sierra Nevada.

Population densities experience many ups and downs and have been shown to range between 2–30 kangaroo rats per hectare (1–12 per acre). There seems to be no way of predicting whether or not emigration has anything to do with these large fluctuations in population density. Typically, it is only the larger rats that take part in emigration, and females have been shown to exhibit this behavior more often than males.

== Ecology and behavior ==
=== Ecology ===
Heermann's kangaroo rats are burrowing animals, and they manipulate the tunnels already made by other burrowing animals to make their own, such as tunnels made by ground squirrels (Spermophilus). The extent of the burrowing behavior depends on the type of soil present: in areas with fine deep soil their tunnels average 10.7 m (35 ft) long and up to 51 cm (20 in) beneath the surface, whereas in shallow rocky soils the average length is 3.3 m (11 ft) and they do not extend deeper than 19.4 cm (7.6 in). Additionally they have one to four escape routes besides the main entrance.

Heermann's kangaroo rats are granivores, and seeds provide a significant nutritional value to their diet. They are also herbivores, especially during seasons of winter and spring. Additionally, in the wild they have been documented capturing insects at night such as moths, beetles, and grasshoppers. Most of the plant material near the burrows in their home ranges are utilized. They achieve necessary water consumption from seeds and dew from the plant material in their diet, and will only drink from a puddle or direct water source if water intake isn't achieved for several weeks. If the dry food matter increases and humidity is decreased, the mean daily activity of the rats drastically declines.

They do have some predators such as rattlesnakes, gopher snakes, owls, various raptors, coyotes, foxes, weasels, skunks and house cats. However, predation does not seem to have a noticeable impact on population densities.

=== Behavior ===
The Heermann's kangaroo rat does not hibernate, instead it remains more or less active during the year depending on time of day. It lives in a burrow for the majority of the day (up to 23 hours/day) and typically only comes out at night. Rain, fog and a bright full moon will usually prevent them from coming out of their burrow.

They live a solitary life, however, experiments have shown that sociality does alter the rat's behaviors and that the rat does indeed have some ability to form generalized sociality. Sociality is measured by willingness to participate in social interactions. Kangaroo rats exhibit their willingness to interact with each other with a characteristic foot drumming, where increased foot drumming was associated with unwillingness to socialize and the absence of foot drumming was associated with willingness to socialize. High rates of interspecies competition has been observed; however, intraspecies competition between Heermann's kangaroo rats has not been directly observed.

They have been observed dust-bathing after foraging. This behavior consists of them lying on their bellies with they hind limbs extended or alternating keeping either their fore or hind limbs straight. It is thought to help withdraw oil and moisture, thus keeping their fur dry and sleek.

Traveling is mostly done in a bipedal position with occasional hops that generally reach distances about 15 cm (6 in). When moving slowly they are usually in a plantigrade position. On the other hand, when they are moving more quickly they can become saltatorial and can even become ricochetal. When running rapidly their hops can range from 61 to 76 cm (24 to 30 in), and their tail aids in providing counterbalance.

== Reproduction ==
Heermann's kangaroo rat has a wide window in which it primarily breeds, ranging from February to October. Its highest breeding activity is in April, and this decreases in July.

Heermann's kangaroo rat rarely show increased levels of sexual behavior. Copulation is rather quick, and typically only lasts a couple seconds. If the animals are caged, the rats show no increase in sexual behavior. Females rats will even show aggression if her genitalia are swollen and enlarged. During labor, the female rat will assist the delivery of the young with her front paws. The female Heermann's kangaroo rats also fondle her babies after birth with fondling, smelling, and licking.

The young are born bright pink, wrinkled, hairless (except for colorless vibrissae), poikilothermic, and with their eyes closed. Within 22 hours of birth, hair is already developing and beginning to obtain adult pigmentation, beginning at the head and eventually reaching the feet by day 7. Before day 9 it is not possible to differentiate sexes because external genitalia appear the same. Weaning is completed around day 25, and young begin hunting and scavenging independently by 4 weeks.

== Proposed sub-species ==
Nine different sub-species of Dipodomys heermanni had been proposed:

- Dipodomys heermanni arenae
- Dipodomys heermanni berkeleyensis (Berkeley kangaroo rat)
- Dipodomys heermanni dixoni (Merced kangaroo rat)
- Dipodomys heermanni goldmani
- Dipodomys heermanni heermanni (Heermann's kangaroo rat)
- Dipodomys heermanni jolonensis
- Dipodomys heermanni morroensis, (Morro Bay kangaroo rat)
- Dipodomys heermanni swarthi
- Dipodomys heermanni tularensis

However, recent mitochondrial DNA and morphometric analyses failed to show support for any genetic differentiation or morphological clustering across geography to support the above subspecies delineations.
