= Brachycoryna montana =

Scientific classification
- Kingdom: Animalia
- Phylum: Arthropoda
- Clade: Pancrustacea
- Class: Insecta
- Order: Coleoptera
- Suborder: Polyphaga
- Infraorder: Cucujiformia
- Family: Chrysomelidae
- Genus: Brachycoryna
- Species: B. montana

Binomial name
- Brachycoryna montana (Horn, 1883)

Synonyms
- Microrhopala montana Horn, 1883

Species of beetle

Brachycoryna montana is a species of beetle of the family Chrysomelidae. It is found in Canada (Alberta, British Columbia, Manitoba, Ontario, Saskatchewan) and the United States (Arizona, Colorado, Idaho, Minnesota, Montana, Nevada, North Dakota, South Dakota, Utah).

== Description ==
Adults reach a length of about 2.5-3.4 mm. They have a black head, pronotum and elytron.

== Biology ==
The foodplant is unknown, but adults have been collected on Artemisia species, including Artemisia tridentata.
