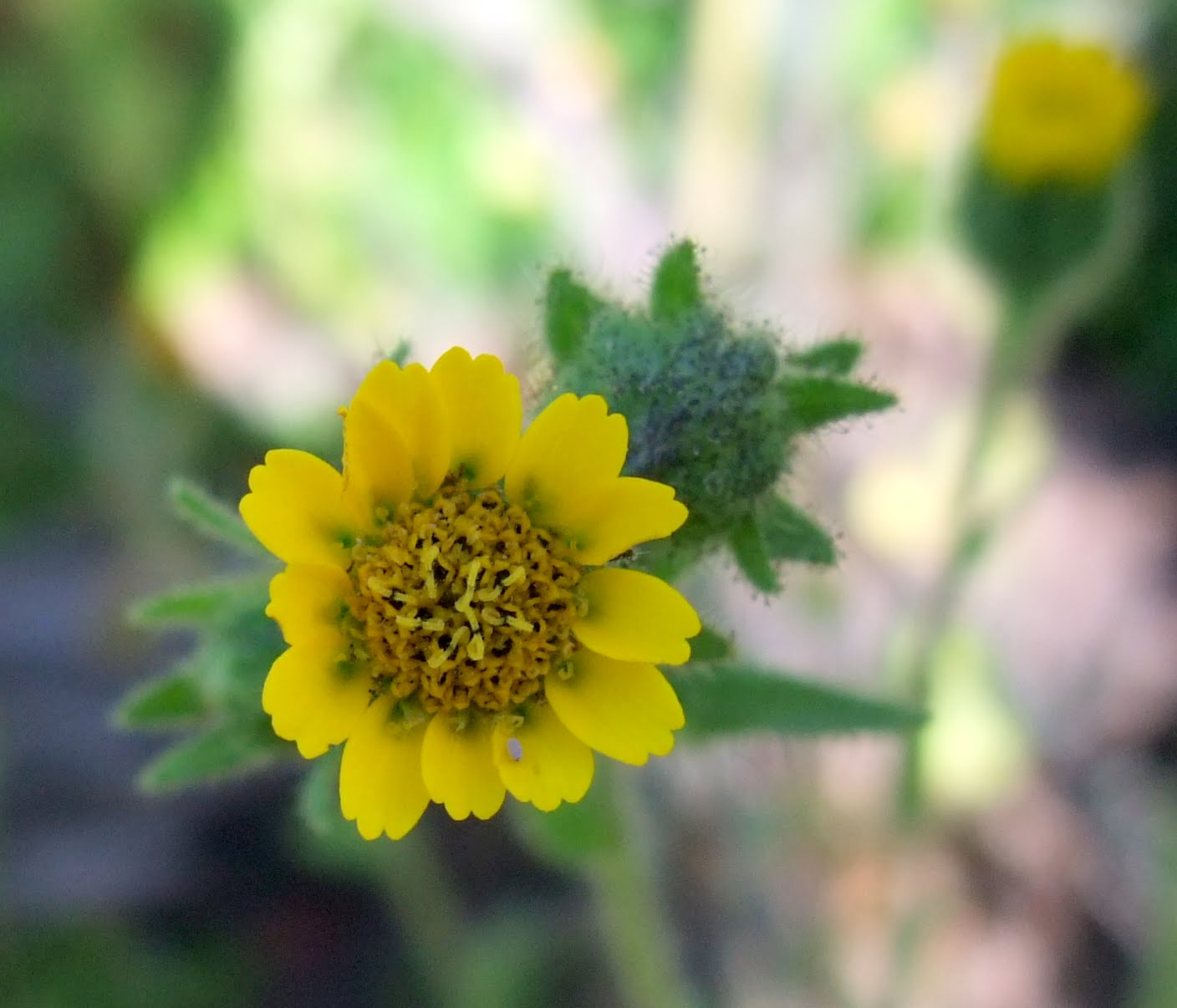
- Holocarpha macradenia

Scientific classification
- Kingdom: Plantae
- Clade: Tracheophytes
- Clade: Angiosperms
- Clade: Eudicots
- Clade: Asterids
- Order: Asterales
- Family: Asteraceae
- Subfamily: Asteroideae
- Tribe: Madieae
- Subtribe: Madiinae
- Genus: Holocarpha; Greene 1897

= Holocarpha =

Genus of flowering plants

Holocarpha is a small genus of flowering plants in the family Asteraceae. The genus contains four species of tarweeds, which are all endemic to California.

== Description ==
Holocarpha are glandular, aromatic annual herbs bearing yellow flowers.

Species

- Holocarpha heermannii - Heermann's tarweed
- Holocarpha macradenia - Santa Cruz tarweed
- Holocarpha obconica - San Joaquin tarweed
- Holocarpha virgata - yellowflower tarweed

== Other "tarweeds" ==
Plants with the same common name, but in a different genus include:

- Santa Susana tarweed - Deinandra minthornii - (Asteraceae, endemic state-listed rare species in Simi Hills and nearby ranges)
