= Brachycoryna pumila =

Scientific classification
- Kingdom: Animalia
- Phylum: Arthropoda
- Clade: Pancrustacea
- Class: Insecta
- Order: Coleoptera
- Suborder: Polyphaga
- Infraorder: Cucujiformia
- Family: Chrysomelidae
- Genus: Brachycoryna
- Species: B. pumila

Binomial name
- Brachycoryna pumila Guérin-Méneville, 1844

Species of beetle

Brachycoryna pumila is a species of leaf beetle in the family Chrysomelidae. It is found in North America, the Caribbean, Central and South America, where it has been recorded from Colombia, Mexico (Baja California), the United States (Alabama, Arizona, Florida, Louisiana, Mississippi, Missouri, Oklahoma, Texas, Utah), Belize, Costa Rica, El Salvador, Guatemala, Honduras, Jamaica, Nicaragua, Panama and Venezuela.

== Description ==
Adults reach a length of about 2.5-3.5 mm. They have a black head, while the pronotum is brownish-yellow. The elytron is yellow with variable brown markings.

== Biology ==
They have been recorded feeding on Sida rhombifolia, Sida spinosa, Sida cordifolia, Malvastrum cormandelinua, and Malvastrum americanum.
