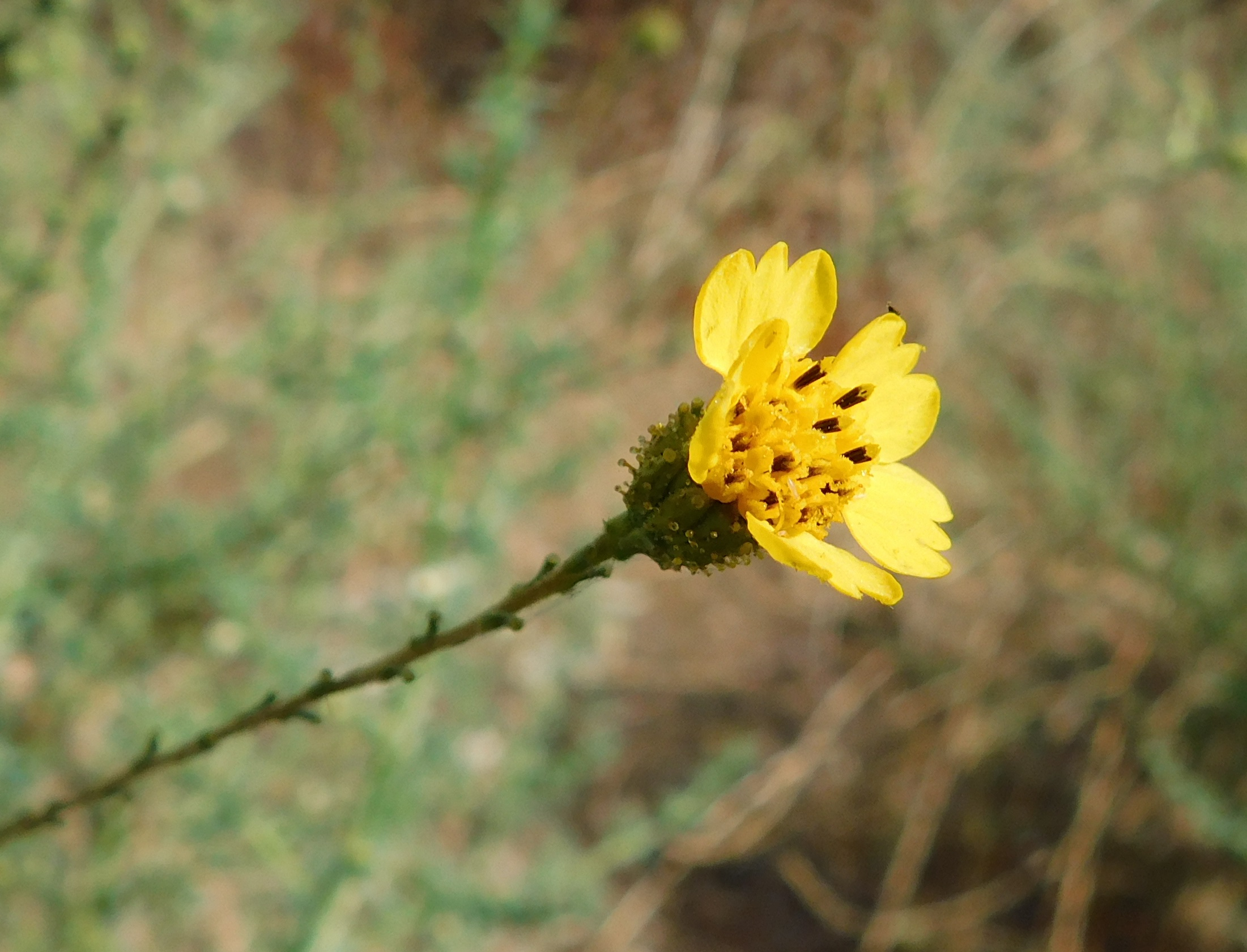

Scientific classification
- Kingdom: Plantae
- Clade: Embryophytes
- Clade: Tracheophytes
- Clade: Spermatophytes
- Clade: Angiosperms
- Clade: Eudicots
- Clade: Asterids
- Order: Asterales
- Family: Asteraceae
- Genus: Holocarpha
- Species: H. virgata

Binomial name
- Holocarpha virgata (A.Gray) D.D.Keck 1958

Synonyms
- Hemizonia virgata A.Gray 1859; Deinandra virgata (A. Gray) Greene

= Holocarpha virgata =

Species of flowering plant

Holocarpha virgata is a species of flowering plant in the family Asteraceae known by the common names yellowflower tarweed, pitgland tarweed, and narrow tarplant.

== Distribution ==
Holocarpha virgata is endemic to California, where it is most common in the San Joaquin Valley and Sacramento Valley of the Central Valley, and adjacent foothills of the Inner Coast Ranges and Sierra Nevada (U.S.). There are additional populations in foothills of the Peninsular Ranges in San Diego County, western Riverside County, and Orange County.

== Description ==
Holocarpha virgata is an annual herb producing an erect stem 20 centimetres (7.9 in) to over 1 metre (3.3 ft) tall. It has many branches and is lined with oily glands and hairs. The linear leaves are up to 15 centimetres (5.9 in) long near the base of the plant and those along the stem are much smaller.

The inflorescence is made up of several short branches lined densely in small, thick, green bracts. The bracts are just a few millimeters long and are tipped with glands. At the ends of the branches are flower heads, each lined with phyllaries which are covered in knobby resin glands. Each head contains 9-25 disc florets which are yellow with black or purplish anthers. The head has a fringe of 3-7 yellow ray florets which often have lobed tips.

Subspecies

- Holocarpha virgata subsp. elongata D. D. Keck - San Diego County, western Riverside County, and Orange County
- Holocarpha virgata subsp. virgata - Central Valley, etc.
