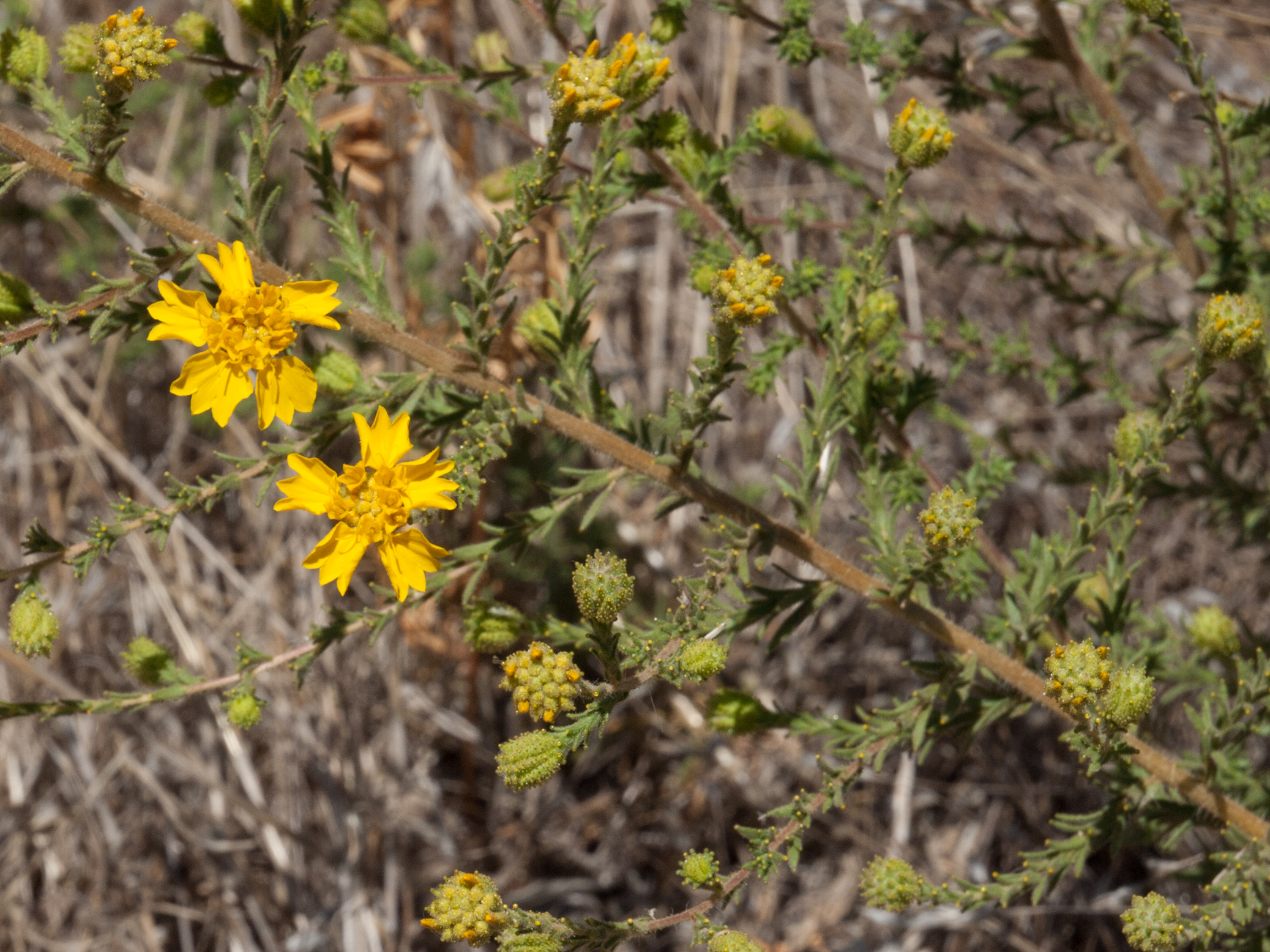

Conservation status
- Apparently Secure (NatureServe)

Scientific classification
- Kingdom: Plantae
- Clade: Tracheophytes
- Clade: Angiosperms
- Clade: Eudicots
- Clade: Asterids
- Order: Asterales
- Family: Asteraceae
- Genus: Holocarpha
- Species: H. heermannii

Binomial name
- Holocarpha heermannii (Greene) D.D.Keck

Synonyms
- Hemizonia heermanni Greene; Deinandra heermannii (Greene) Greene

= Holocarpha heermannii =

Species of flowering plant

Holocarpha heermannii is a species of flowering plant in the family Asteraceae known by the common name Heermann's tarweed. It is endemic to California.

== Distribution ==
Holocarpha heermannii grows in the hills, mountains, and valleys of the central and southern part of California. It is most common in the Inner Coast Ranges in the eastern San Francisco Bay Area, the southern Sierra Nevada foothills, and the Tehachapi Mountains. It is also found in the Southern Outer California Coast Ranges and western Transverse Ranges.

== Description ==
Holocarpha heermannii is an annual herb growing mostly erect from 20 centimetres (7.9 in) to over 1 metre (3.3 ft) in height. The stem is densely glandular and coated in short and long hairs. The leaves are up to 10 centimetres (3.9 in) long near the base of the plant and those along the stem are smaller.

The inflorescence is a spreading array of branches bearing clusters of flower heads. Each flower head is lined with phyllaries which are coated in large bulbous resin glands. They are hairy and sticky in texture. The head contains many yellow disc florets surrounded by three to 10 golden yellow ray florets.

The ray and fertile disc florets produce achenes of different shapes.
