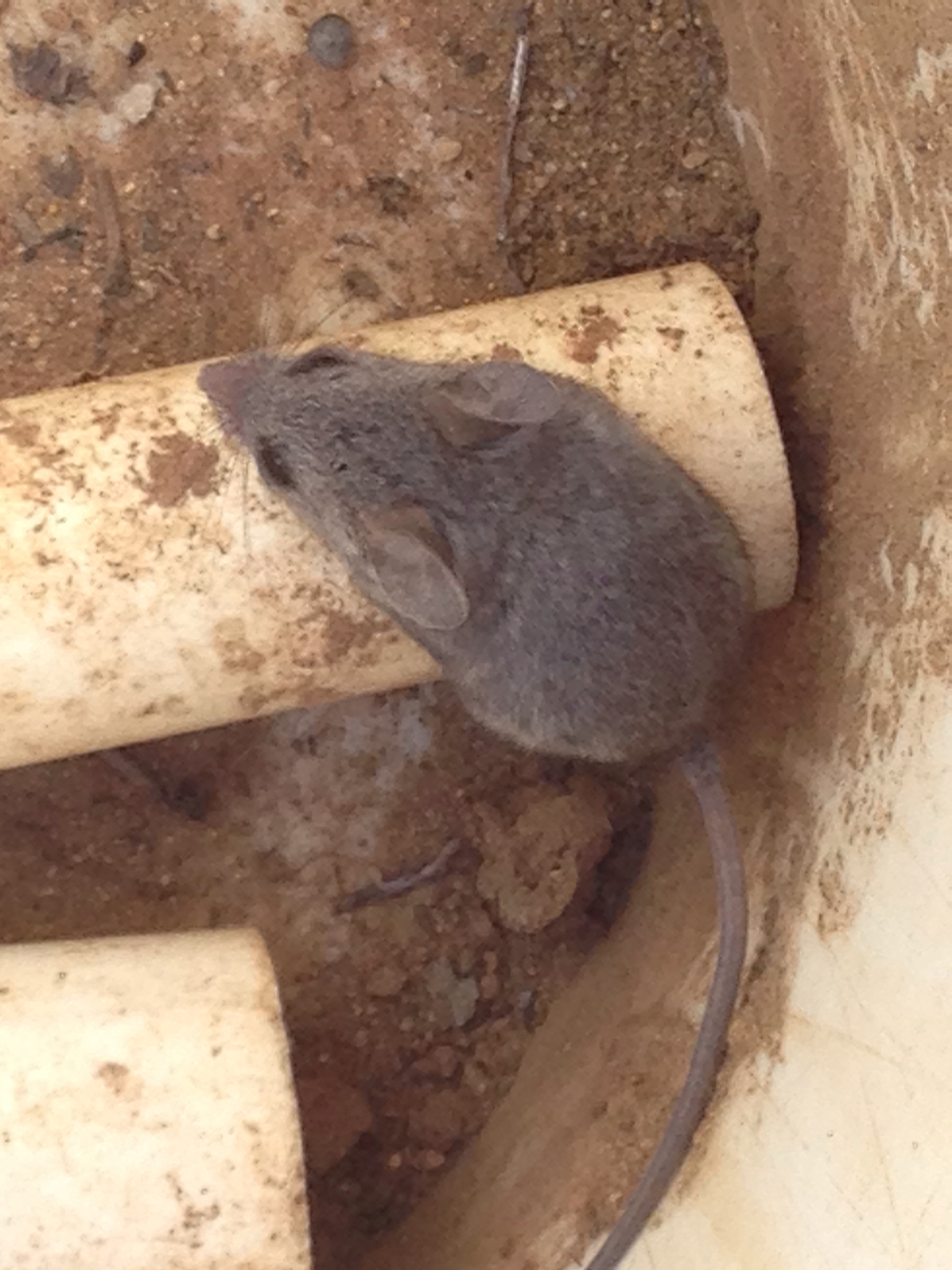

Conservation status
- Least Concern (IUCN 3.1)

- Secure (NatureServe)

Scientific classification
- Kingdom: Animalia
- Phylum: Chordata
- Class: Mammalia
- Order: Rodentia
- Family: Cricetidae
- Subfamily: Neotominae
- Genus: Peromyscus
- Species: P. fraterculus

Binomial name
- Peromyscus fraterculus (Miller, 1892)

Synonyms
- Vesperimus fraterculus Miller, 1892; Sitomys herronii Rhodes, 1893; Peromyscus eremicus propinquus Allen, 1898; Peromyscus homochroia Elliot, 1903

= Northern Baja deer mouse =

Species of rodent

The northern Baja deer mouse or northern Baja deermouse (Peromyscus fraterculus) is a species of rodent in the family Cricetidae. It is a species of the genus Peromyscus, a closely related group of New World mice often called "deermice". It is native to Southern California and the Baja California peninsula as well as several islands in the Gulf of California. P. fraterculus was previously considered a subspecies of the cactus mouse (Peromyscus eremicus) prior to a 2000 study which identified genetic differences and suggested P. fraterculus is more closely related to Eva's desert mouse (P. eva) than to P. eremicus.
