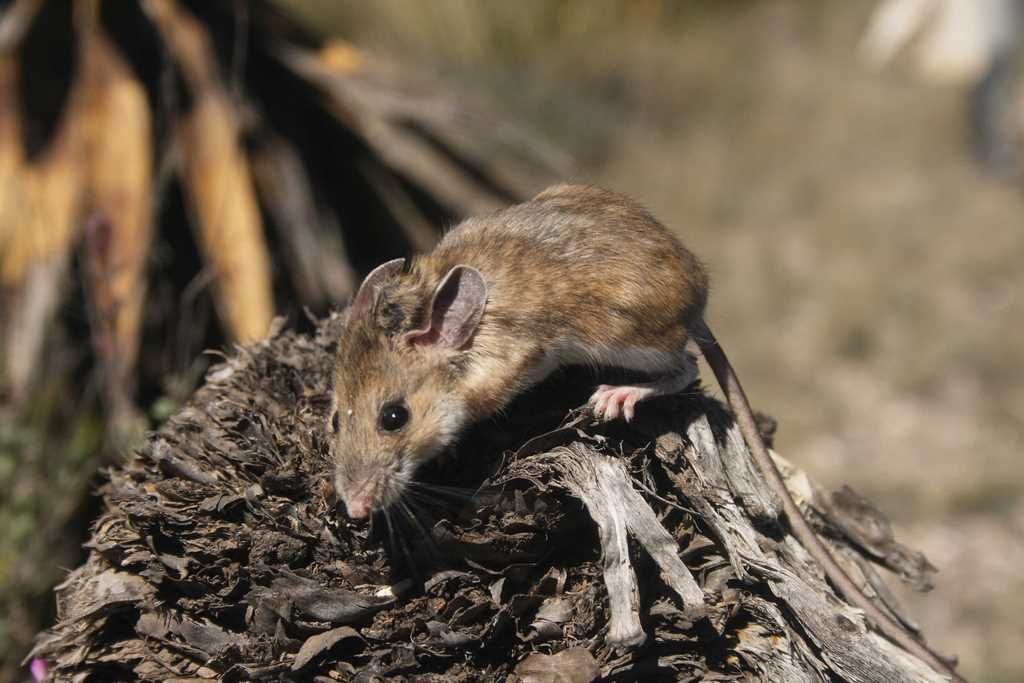

Conservation status
- Least Concern (IUCN 3.1)

Scientific classification
- Kingdom: Animalia
- Phylum: Chordata
- Class: Mammalia
- Order: Rodentia
- Family: Cricetidae
- Subfamily: Neotominae
- Genus: Peromyscus
- Species: P. pectoralis

Binomial name
- Peromyscus pectoralis Osgood, 1904

= White-ankled mouse =

Species of mammal

The white-ankled mouse (Peromyscus pectoralis) is a species of rodent in the family Cricetidae. It is a species of the genus Peromyscus, a closely related group of New World mice often called "deermice". It is found in Mexico, and in New Mexico, Oklahoma and Texas in the United States.

The white-ankled mouse is commonly found in coexistence with the brush mouse and Texas mouse (P. boylii and P. attaweri, respectively). Often, the sympatric overlap in characteristics between these species makes it difficult to identify a specific species. The most distinguishing feature of the white-ankled mouse, and the one most used to identify the species, is the baculum of males. The tip of the white-ankled mouse's baculum is long and cartilaginous, whereas the tips of brush and Texas mice are short and rounded.

== Description ==
White-ankled mice have three distinct pelages in their life cycles: juvenile, subadult, and adult. Two molt phases (post-juvenile and post-subadult) are necessary for the distinct pelages in each phase of their lives.

In Texas, the white-ankled mouse differs from the Texas mouse by having shorter hind feet, white ankles, paler color, and a more defined bicolor tail. The white-ankled mouse differs from the Brush mouse by having smaller molar teeth, white ankles, and shorter hair on the end of the tail.

== Distribution and habitat ==
Because of the physical similarities between the white-ankled mouse and other mice species, the white-ankled mouse is often misidentified. In New Mexico, for example, many of the distribution ranges of the white-ankled mouse were based on misidentified museum specimens. Upon both further review of these specimens and an experiment involving live traps, the actual distribution of the white-ankled mouse in New Mexico was expanded by 225 km (140 mi) north-northwest.

When studying the microhabitats of these coexisting mice, it was discovered that the Texas mouse utilizes trees and the white-ankled mouse does not. In an experiment that removed the Texas mice from these cohabitated microhabitats, the white-ankled mice still did not use the trees. These findings suggest the microhabitats on the white-ankled mouse are inherently selected rather than a result of interspecific competition.

The white-ankled mouse is partial to rocky and bushy terrains within a variety of habitats: deserts, grasslands and woodlands.

== Diet ==
White-ankled mice have been known to feed on a variety of seeds, including hackberries, acorns, juniper berries, and cactus fruit.
