= Carleton's deer mouse =

Scientific classification
- Kingdom: Animalia
- Phylum: Chordata
- Class: Mammalia
- Order: Rodentia
- Family: Cricetidae
- Subfamily: Neotominae
- Genus: Peromyscus
- Species: P. carletoni

Binomial name
- Peromyscus carletoni Bradley et al., 2014

Species of rodent

Carleton's deer mouse or Carleton's deermouse (Peromyscus carletoni) is a species of rodent in the family Cricetidae. It is a species of the genus Peromyscus, a closely related group of New World mice often called "deermice". It is restricted to high-elevation pine-oak forests in Nayarit in western Mexico. A member of the Peromyscus boylii group, it was named as a species in 2014 and named after Peromyscus specialist Michael D. Carleton. It is a medium-sized species for the genus, with the tail a little longer than the head-body length. In the skull, the rostrum, the front part of the skull, is relatively short compared to related species, but the nasal bones are long relative to the rostrum. Based on DNA sequence data, the species is most closely related to Peromyscus levipes.
