= Peromyscus schmidlyi =

Conservation status
- Least Concern (IUCN 3.1)

Scientific classification
- Kingdom: Animalia
- Phylum: Chordata
- Class: Mammalia
- Infraclass: Placentalia
- Order: Rodentia
- Family: Cricetidae
- Subfamily: Neotominae
- Genus: Peromyscus
- Species: P. schmidlyi

Binomial name
- Peromyscus schmidlyi Bradley et al., 2004

Species of rodent

Schmidly's deermouse (Peromyscus schmidlyi), is a recently described species of rodent in the family Cricetidae. It is a species of the genus Peromyscus, a closely related group of New World mice often called "deermice". It is native to the mountains of western Mexico. It is part of the highly complex and well-studied Peromyscus boylii species complex. The uniqueness of Peromyscus from this area had long been suspected, but was only formalized in 2004 with the publication of its species description. The species was named in honor of David J. Schmidly, a mammalogist and former president of the University of New Mexico.

The name "Schmidly's deer mouse" is ambiguous, as it is shared by another species, Habromys schmidlyi.

== Description ==
P. schmidlyi, or Schmidly's deermouse, is a typical deer mouse, and can only be reliably distinguished from other members of its species group by DNA analysis.

It is 18 to 21 cm (7.1 to 8.3 in) in length, with a tail 7 to 10 cm (2.8 to 3.9 in) long. The fur is reddish umber over most of the body, becoming almost white on the under parts. The feet have a grey stripe extending past the ankle, and white toes. The tail is dark and bears only coarse, sparse hair, except for a tuft at the tip. It is similar in appearance to the nimble-footed mouse, but is usually larger and darker in color.

Like all deermice, P. schmidlyli has 16 total teeth (i 1/1, c 0/0, p 0/0, m 3/3), and the males have scrotal testes.

=== Detailed parameters ===
The dilated body description is shown below.

Basic data of P. schmidlyi from Sonora	(mm)
Total length	179.5±14.76
Length of tail	86.0±8.57
Length of hind foot	19.4±1.06
Length of ear	19.5±0.93
Length of skull	26.2±1.22
Zygomatic branch	12.9±0.43
Breadth of brain case	12.1±0.30
Depth of cranium	9.4±0.27
Interorbital breadth	4.2±0.15
Breadth of rostrum	4.2±0.20
Length of rostrum	10.4±0.62
Length of palate	4.0±0.33
Length of molar toothrow	4.2±0.19
Length of incisive foramen	4.9±0.38
Breadth of zygomatic plate	1.9±0.32

=== Genetics ===
Its monophyly has been confirmed using parsimony, maximum likelihood, and Bayesian analysis of the mitochondrial cytochrome b gene. The species also differs from other Peromyscus in having the karyotype (FN = 54-56). Its closest relative appears to be Peromyscus levipes.

== Distribution and habitat ==
The species is found in the states of Sinaloa, Sonora and Durango in the Sierra Madre Occidental of Mexico. Like many other members of the P. boylii species group, it is found only at higher elevations, above 2,000 metres (6,600 ft). It is known to inhabit deep gullies and rocky hillsides in pine-oak forests.

The dominant vegetation of these areas consists of pointleaf manzanita, kittle lemonhead, one-seeded jumper, Apache, Ponderosa, and Yecora pine, Arizona white oak, sipuri, and silverleaf oak. The annual vegetation is six-week threeawn, spidergrass, common oats, and needle grams.

== Disease ==
Like all deermice, P. schmidlyi can be a host for viruses and bacteria, and a vector for disease.
