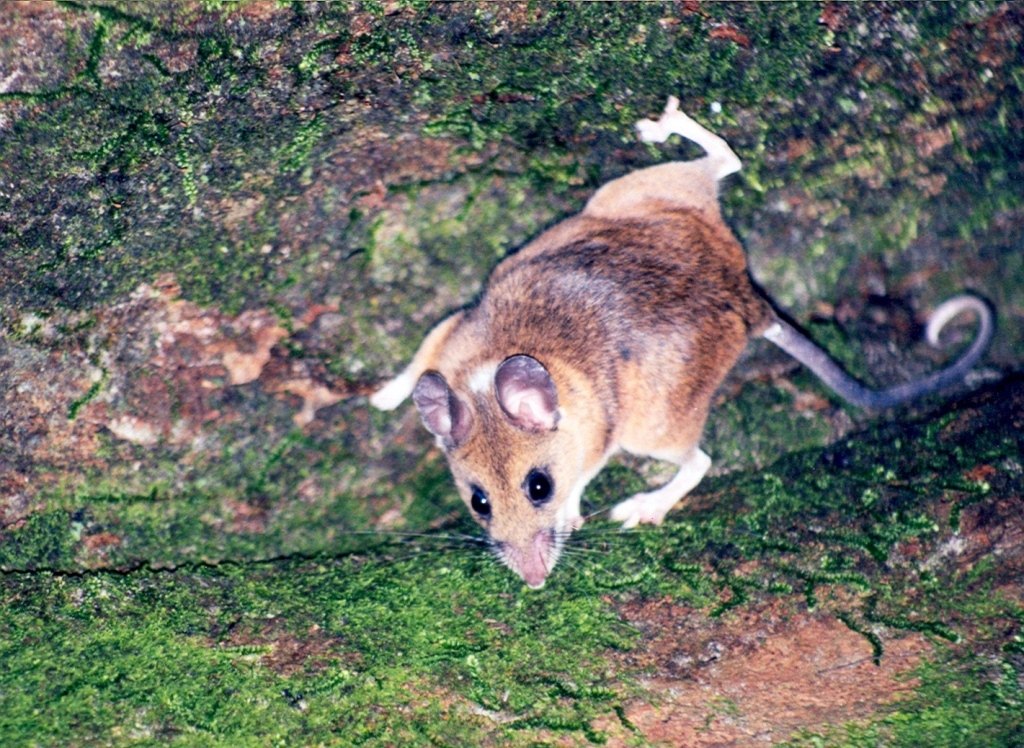

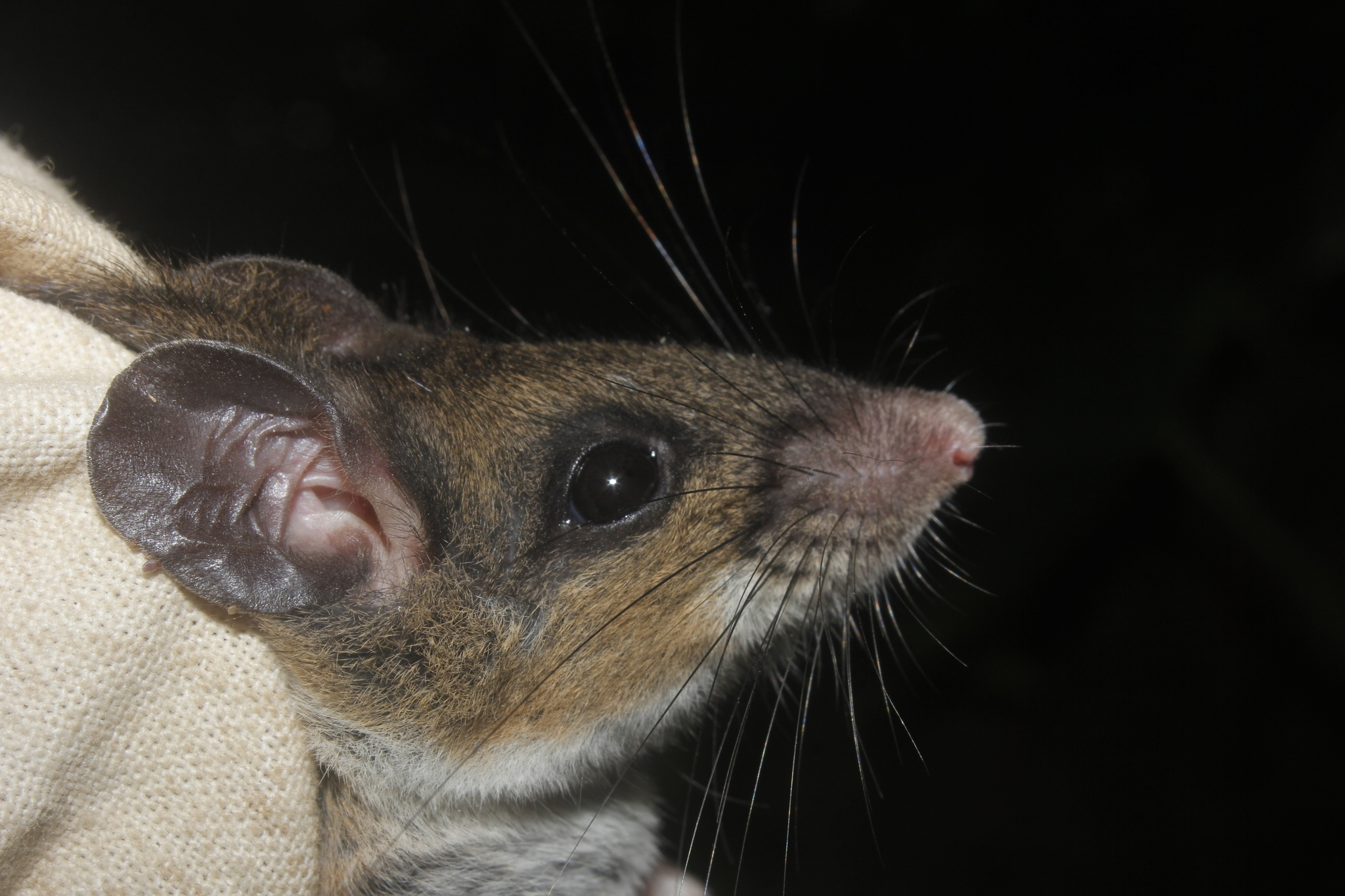

Conservation status
- Least Concern (IUCN 3.1)

Scientific classification
- Kingdom: Animalia
- Phylum: Chordata
- Class: Mammalia
- Order: Rodentia
- Family: Cricetidae
- Subfamily: Neotominae
- Genus: Peromyscus
- Species: P. mexicanus

Binomial name
- Peromyscus mexicanus (Saussure, 1860)

Subspecies
- See text

Synonyms
- Peromyscus nudipes

= Mexican deer mouse =

Species of rodent

The Mexican deer mouse or Mexican deermouse (Peromyscus mexicanus) is a species of forest-dwelling rodent in the family Cricetidae. It is a species of the genus Peromyscus, a closely related group of New World mice often called "deermice". It is found in southern Mexico and throughout much of Central America.

== Description ==
Mexican deer mice are moderately sized mouse-like animals with narrow, slightly elongated, heads and long tails. They have a combined head and body length of 9 to 12 centimetres (3.5 to 4.7 in), and a tail 10 to 13 centimetres (3.9 to 5.1 in) long.

The fur is soft, short, and generally rufous or russet in color. However, the general body color varies with geographic location, and with the time of year, being generally paler in drier climates or during dry seasons. At the extremes, it may vary from nearly black to pale grey.

The underparts and feet are creamy white, with brown or rufous fur on the upper parts of the limbs. There is a patch of almost blackish fur at the base of the whiskers, and a dark ring around the eyes. The fur on the tail is sparse and very short, making it almost invisible on casual examination; a feature that distinguishes the Mexican deer mouse from almost all other species of Peromyscus.

== Distribution and habitat ==
The Mexican deer mouse inhabits the tropical lowlands of southern Mexico, reaching as far north as San Luis Potosi in the east and the Guerrero-Oaxaca border in the west. It is also found in the central and Pacific coastal regions of Central America, including Costa Rica, El Salvador, Guatemala, Honduras, and Nicaragua. At the extreme southern end of its range it reaches the western border regions of Panama.

It is a forest dwelling species, and is more common in deep forest than along woodland edges. It is especially common where limestone cliffs or boulders provide plentiful ground cover, but, in general, it is among the most commonly encountered mammals in the dense forests of Central America and southern Mexico. It is also relatively common in coffee and cocoa plantations.

== Ecology ==
Mexican deermice live in burrows in areas with substantial cover, such as fallen logs, tree roots, or dense undergrowth. Densities of up to 50 individuals per hectare have been reported, but can be much lower where food is less abundant. The home range of individual Mexican deer mice has been estimated at over 0.5 hectares (1.2 acres). They are omnivorous, feeding on both seeds and invertebrates. They eat a wide variety of seeds, including plums, mangos, coffee beans, and acorns, as well as those from various local species of Solanaceae and Asteraceae. The invertebrates eaten are mainly beetles, spiders, ants, and grasshoppers.

== Reproduction ==
Mexican deer mice breed throughout the year, and have a gestation period of 28 to 32 days. Litters consist of between one and four young (usually two or three), and the female enters estrus again immediately after giving birth. The young first begin to develop hair at around six days, by which time they are able to crawl about, although they are not fully mobile until around twelve days. Adults reach sexual maturity at between 46 and 77 days old, but a female typically only gives birth to one or two litters during her lifetime.

== Conservation ==
Although it is not a threatened species, it has been found to be a good bioindicator for testing conservation management strategies within Biosphere Reserves.

== Classification ==
The Mexican deer mouse belongs to the mexicanus species group within the genus Peromyscus. Genetic analysis has shown that its closest relatives are the Yucatan, Guatemalan, Chiapan, and naked-eared deer mice. Indeed, these were so similar genetically that the Mexican deer mouse may be paraphyletic with respect to some or all of the other named species.

Seven sub-species of Mexican deer mouse are currently recognised:

- P. m. mexicanus - Veracruz
- P. m. angelensis - Oaxaca coastal lowlands
- P. m. azulensis - Juchitán highlands, Oaxaca
- P. m. putlaensis - Putla District, Oaxaca
- P. m. saxatilis - Central America
- P. m. teapensis - Tabasco
- P. m. totontepecus - Sierra Norte de Oaxaca
