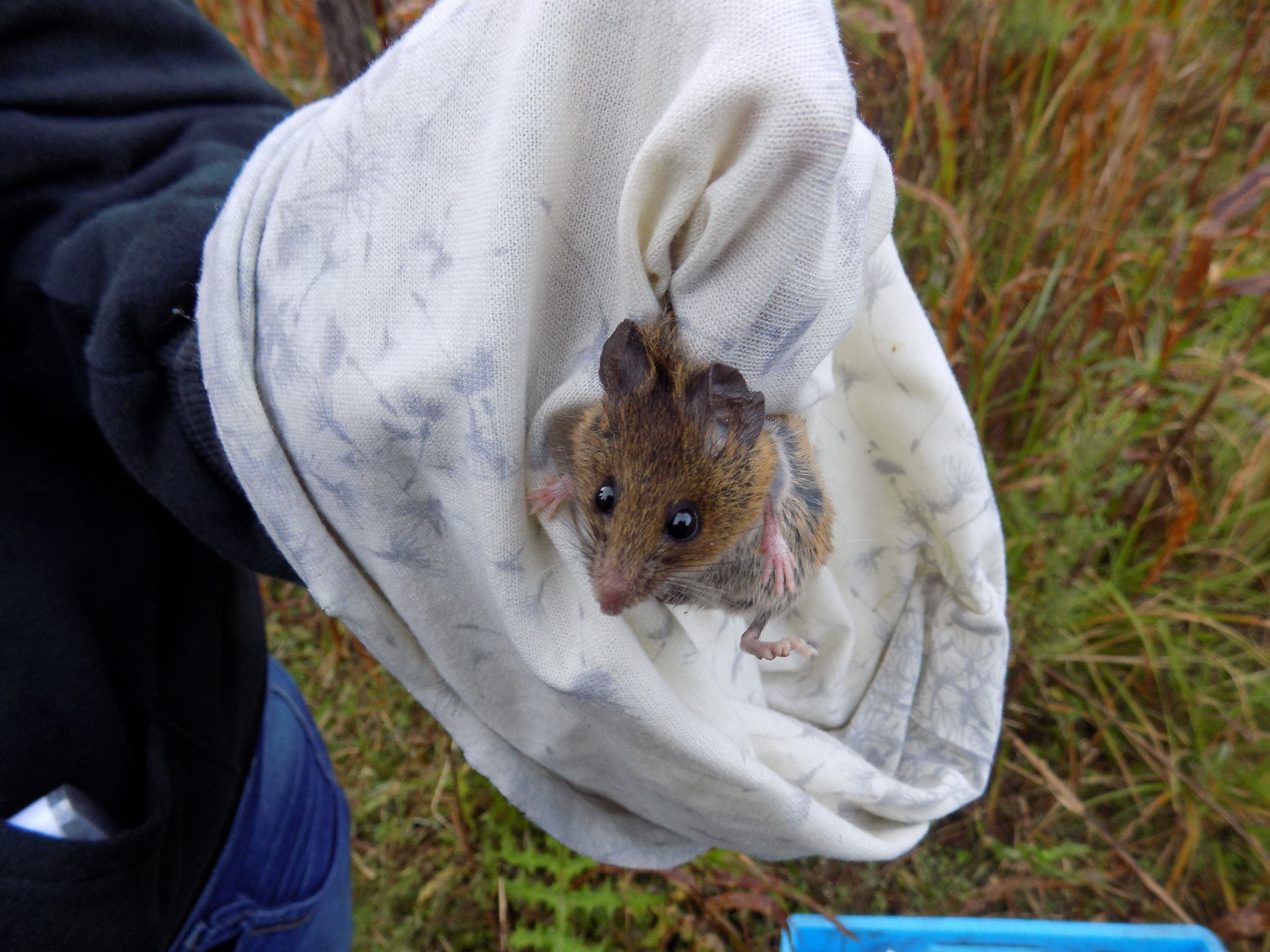

Conservation status
- Least Concern (IUCN 3.1)

Scientific classification
- Kingdom: Animalia
- Phylum: Chordata
- Class: Mammalia
- Order: Rodentia
- Family: Cricetidae
- Subfamily: Neotominae
- Genus: Peromyscus
- Species: P. aztecus

Binomial name
- Peromyscus aztecus (Saussure, 1860)
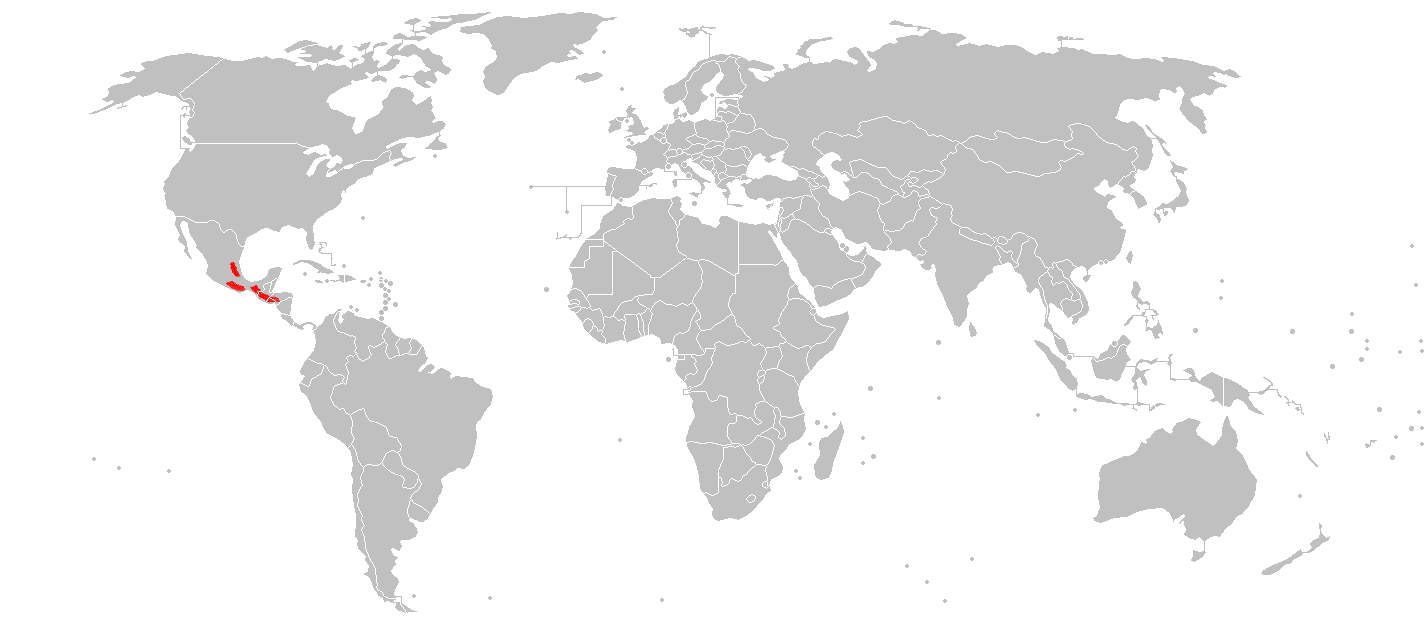

= Aztec mouse =

Species of rodent

The Aztec mouse (Peromyscus aztecus) is a species of rodent in the family Cricetidae. It is a species of the genus Peromyscus, a closely related group of New World mice often called "deermice". It is native to southern Mexico and parts of Central America.

== Description ==
The Aztec mouse is a typically sized member of its genus, with a total length of 20 to 26 cm (7.9 to 10.2 in), about half of which is made up by the tail. The fur is ochre mixed with black over the upper surface of the body, a brighter reddish color at the sides, and pale buff beneath. The tail is also paler on the underside, and often ends with a white tip. The feet are white, with hairs on the soles of the hindfeet, one of the features that allows it to be distinguished from the otherwise similar looking, and more widespread, brush mouse.

== Distribution and habitat ==
Aztec mice are found in three disjunct regions of southern Mexico, in southern Guatemala and Honduras, and in much of El Salvador. Four subspecies have been identified:

- P. a. aztecus - the centers of Veracruz and Guerrero
- P. a. cordillerae - El Salvador
- P. a. evides - Oaxaca
- P. a. oaxacensis - extreme eastern Oaxaca, Chiapas, Guatemala, and Honduras

The mice live in mountainous regions, between 1,000 and 2,700 m (3,300 and 8,900 ft) altitude. Here they are found in the limits of humid highland forests, ranging from cloud forests to highland coniferous forest dominated by juniper and pine. They are also found in sugar cane and coffee plantations.

== Biology ==
Aztec mice primarily eat grasses and seeds, although as much as a third of their diet may consist of insects at certain times of the year, including ants, crickets, beetles, and weevils. Although precise details of their mating habits are unknown, pregnant females have been found from May to November, and litter sizes of up to five have been recorded.

== Conservation status ==
The Aztec mouse is not a threatened species. Its conservation status is of least concern because its large distribution, a presumed large population, and its tolerance to various kinds of habitats. Since it lives in protected areas and no threat is apparent, it is unlikely to decline to levels of threatened species.
