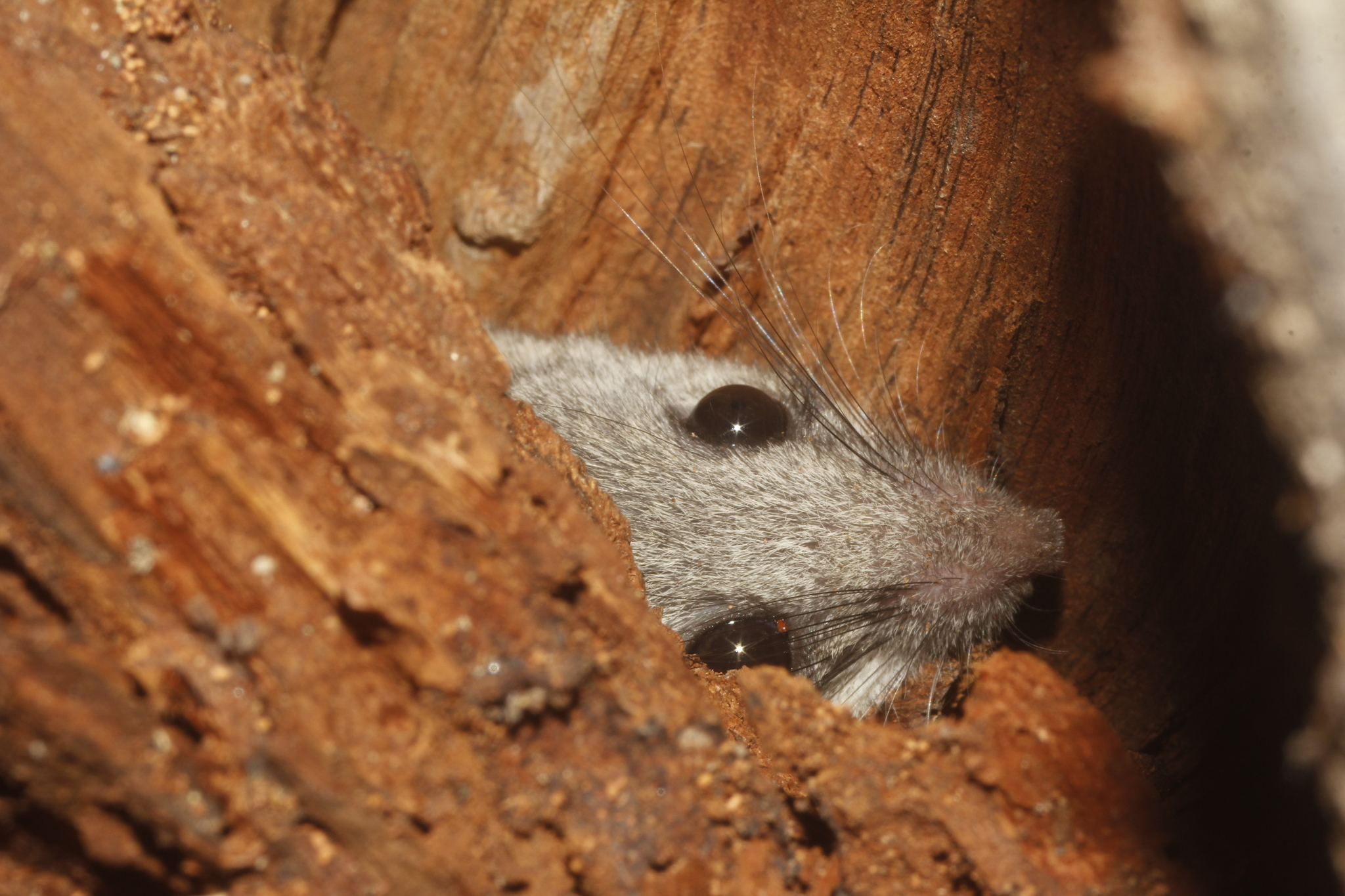

Conservation status
- Vulnerable (IUCN 3.1)

Scientific classification
- Kingdom: Animalia
- Phylum: Chordata
- Class: Mammalia
- Order: Rodentia
- Family: Cricetidae
- Subfamily: Neotominae
- Genus: Peromyscus
- Species: P. simulus

Binomial name
- Peromyscus simulus Osgood, 1904

Synonyms
- Peromyscus boylii simulus

= Nayarit mouse =

Species of rodent

The Nayarit mouse or Sinaloan deermouse (Peromyscus simulus) is a species of rodent in the family Cricetidae. It is a species of the genus Peromyscus, a closely related group of New World mice often called "deermice". It is endemic to Mexico. It was considered a subspecies of brush mouse until 1977.

== Description ==
The Nayarit mouse is the smallest mouse within the P. boylii species group, with a head and body length of about 10 cm (3.9 in), and a tail measuring about the same again. They typically also have a shorter snout than other members of the species group. They have tawny fur, with creamy-white underparts and a poorly defined stripe of darker, almost black, fur down the middle of the back. The limbs are dusky to sooty, with white feet. The tail is hairy, usually darker above than below, and ends in a distinct tuft.

== Distribution and habitat ==
The Nayarit mouse is found only along the Pacific coast of Mexico, from southern Sinaloa to central Nayarit. It inhabits forested terrain in coastal plains and river valleys below 200 m (660 ft), including mangrove swamps, acacia thickets and thorn scrub. There are no recognised subspecies.
