= Western deer mouse =

- In Linn County, Kansas

Scientific classification
- Kingdom: Animalia
- Phylum: Chordata
- Class: Mammalia
- Infraclass: Placentalia
- Order: Rodentia
- Family: Cricetidae
- Subfamily: Neotominae
- Genus: Peromyscus
- Species: P. sonoriensis

Binomial name
- Peromyscus sonoriensis (Le Conte, 1853)

Species of rodent

The western deermouse or western deer mouse (Peromyscus sonoriensis) is a rodent native to North America. It is a species of the genus Peromyscus, a closely related group of New World mice often called "deermice". It is widespread throughout the western half of the continent, mainly in areas west of the Mississippi River.

== Taxonomy ==
It was formerly confused with the eastern deermouse (P. maniculatus), with both species being grouped under P. maniculatus as the North American deermouse. However, due to the significant morphological variation in the species, there was always long-standing confusion over the actual taxonomy of P. maniculatus. A 2019 study found significant genetic divergence within the species and split it into two, with maniculatus representing the "eastern" group and sonoriensis representing the "western" group.

== Description ==
P. sonoriensis is a short-tailed deermouse with a distinctive white underside and white feet. Their coat color ranges from fulvous to brownish. They can be mistaken for the eastern deer mouse, which is indistinguishable except by range, or for the white-footed mouse, which has a tail with indistinct bicoloring. Their range splits with the eastern deer mouse along the Mississippi River. They weigh between 15 and 32 grams and are usually around 170 millimeters long.

== Distribution and habitat ==
Peromyscus sonoriensis is an abundant species in areas of North America west of the Mississippi River. They are populous in the western mountains and live in wooded areas and areas that were previously wooded. Deer mice inhabit a wide variety of plant communities including grasslands, brushy areas, woodlands, and forests. In a survey of small mammals on 29 sites in subalpine forests in Colorado and Wyoming, the deer mouse had the highest frequency of occurrence; however, it was not always the most abundant small mammal. Deer mice were trapped in four of six forest communities in eastern Washington and northern Idaho, and they were the only rodent in ponderosa pine (Pinus ponderosa) savanna.

Although found throughout most of western North America, it is absent from parts of the Southwestern United States and most of Mexico, where it is instead replaced with the similar southern deer mouse (P. labecula), cactus mouse (P. eremicus), and black-eared mouse (P. melanotis); Baja California and most of California south of San Francisco Bay, where it is replaced by Gambel's deer mouse (P. gambelii); and the coastal region of the Pacific Northwest from Washington northwards, where it is replaced by the northwestern deer mouse (P. keeni), and Yukon in Canada, where it is replaced by the Yukon deer mouse (P. arcticus).

== Reproduction and life span ==
The species is polygynous, meaning that one male mates with multiple females.

=== Breeding season ===
In Plumas County, California, deer mice bred through December in good mast (both soft and hard masts) years but ceased breeding in June of a poor mast year. Deer mice breed throughout the year in the Willamette Valley, but in other areas on the Oregon coast there is usually a lull during the wettest and coldest weather. In southeastern Arizona at least one-third of captured deer mice were in breeding condition in winter.

=== Longetivity and mortality ===
O'Farrell reported that a population of deer mice in big sagebrush/grasslands had completely turned over (e.g., there were no surviving adults of the initial population) over the course of one summer.

== Predators ==
Deer mice are important prey for snakes (Viperidae), owls (Strigidae), minks (Neovison vison), martens (Martes americana) and other mustelids, as well as skunks (Mephitis and Spilogale spp.), bobcats (Lynx rufus), domestic cats (Felis catus), coyotes (Canis latrans), foxes (Vulpes and Urocyon spp.), and ringtail cats (Bassariscus astutus). They are also parasitized by Cuterebra fontinella.
