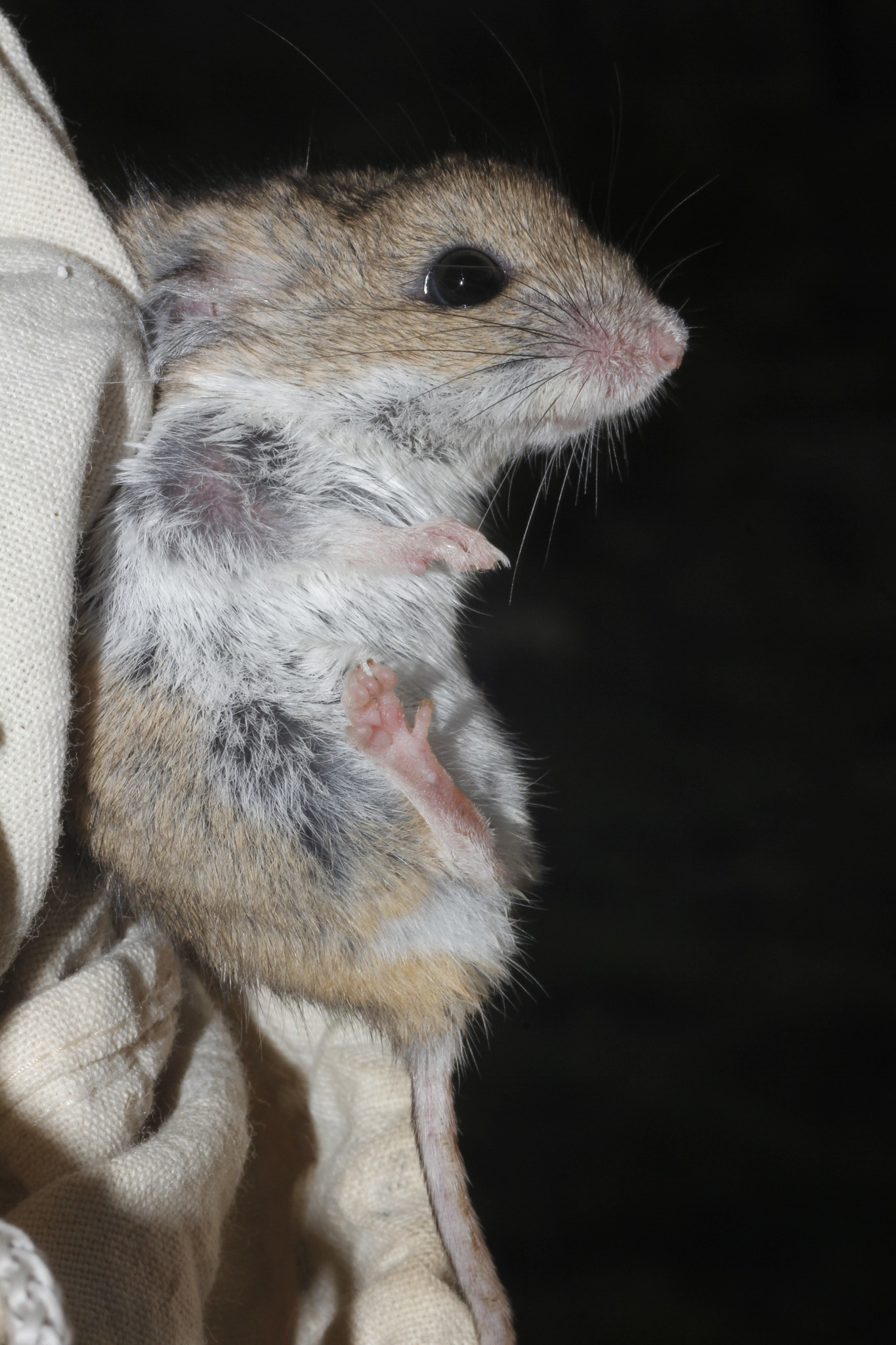

Scientific classification
- Kingdom: Animalia
- Phylum: Chordata
- Class: Mammalia
- Order: Rodentia
- Family: Cricetidae
- Subfamily: Neotominae
- Genus: Peromyscus
- Species: P. labecula

Binomial name
- Peromyscus labecula Elliot, 1903

= Southern deer mouse =

Species of rodent

The southern deermouse or southern deer mouse (Peromyscus labecula) is a species of rodent in the family Cricetidae. It is a species of the genus Peromyscus, a closely related group of New World mice often called "deermice". It is found in the United States and Mexico.

== Taxonomy ==
The species was originally thought to be conspecific with the North American deermouse (now eastern deermouse), P. maniculatus, as P. m. labecula, P. m. blandus, and P. m. fulvus. However, later studies found these subspecies together comprise a distinct species from P. maniculatus, and they were split from maniculatus in a study published in 2019 as P. labecula, which was followed by the American Society of Mammalogists.

== Distribution ==
This species is distributed from the Southwestern United States (southern New Mexico and western Texas) south to southern Mexico, in the state of Oaxaca. In the southern portion of its range, it is sympatric with the similar black-eared mouse (P. melanotis).
