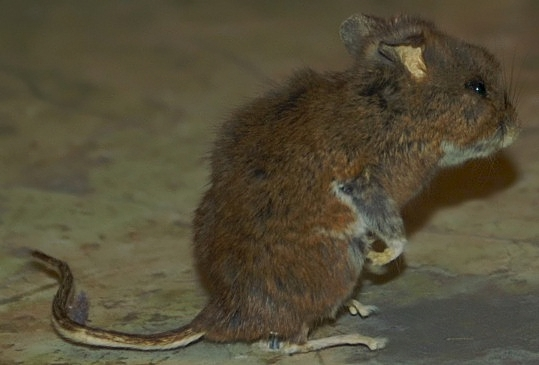
- Preserved specimen of the Anacapa Island subspecies.

Scientific classification
- Kingdom: Animalia
- Phylum: Chordata
- Class: Mammalia
- Order: Rodentia
- Family: Cricetidae
- Subfamily: Neotominae
- Genus: Peromyscus
- Species: P. gambelii

Binomial name
- Peromyscus gambelii (Baird, 1858)

= Gambel's deer mouse =

Species of rodent

Gambel's deermouse or Gambel's deer mouse (Peromyscus gambelii) is a species of rodent in the family Cricetidae. It is a species of the genus Peromyscus, a closely related group of New World mice often called "deermice". It is native to the United States and Mexico.

== Taxonomy ==
It was formerly considered a subspecies of the western deer mouse (P. sonoriensis) (then thought to represent western populations of the North American deer mouse, Peromyscus maniculatus, now referred to as the eastern deer mouse) as P. m. gambelii. However, taxonomic studies in 2017 found it to represent a distinct species from P. maniculatus, and thus reclassified it as a distinct species, a change later also followed by the American Society of Mammalogists. In addition, Baja California populations were formerly thought to represent a distinct subspecies P. m. coolidgei, but taxonomic studies found it to be conspecific with P. gambelii.

== Distribution ==
The species ranges from southern California (south of the San Francisco Bay) in the United States south to Baja California in Mexico. Many deermouse populations found on islands off Baja California's Pacific coast and the Channel Islands of California, which were formerly classified as subspecies of P. maniculatus likely belong to this species.
