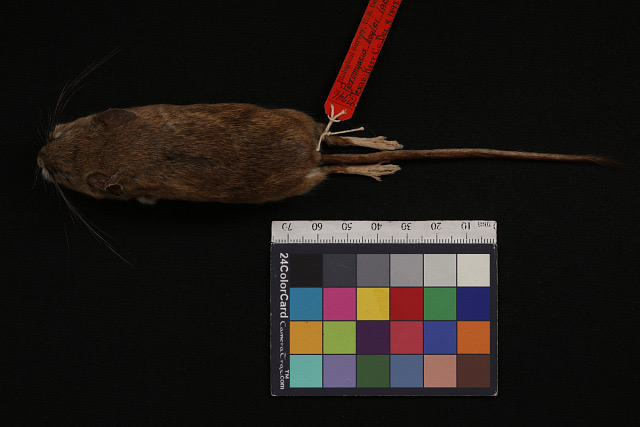

Conservation status
- Least Concern (IUCN 3.1)

- Secure (NatureServe)

Scientific classification
- Kingdom: Animalia
- Phylum: Chordata
- Class: Mammalia
- Order: Rodentia
- Family: Cricetidae
- Subfamily: Neotominae
- Genus: Peromyscus
- Species: P. attwateri

Binomial name
- Peromyscus attwateri J.A. Allen, 1895

= Texas mouse =

Species of rodent

The Texas mouse (Peromyscus attwateri) is a species of rodent in the family Cricetidae. It is a species of the genus Peromyscus, a closely related group of New World mice often called "deermice". It is found in Arkansas, Kansas, Missouri, Oklahoma, and Texas in the United States. This species is named in honor of Henry Philemon Attwater.

== Description ==
The Texas mouse is considered medium-sized for its genus. Its long, bicolored tail has brownish fur, and the tail is brownish white and well haired, and slightly tufted at the end; it has large hind feet. It has usually dark or dusky ankles, and the ear is medium-sized. Color of the dorsum is dark mixed with brown and blackish hairs, and its side color is pinkish cinnamon, and the belly and feet have a pure white color. The mouse is morphological adapted to have a long tail, for balancing when climbing a vertical surface, and large eyes adapted to activity in darkness.

Adult Peromyscus attwateri usually reach a total length of about 182 to 220 mm (7.2 to 8.7 in) with weight 25–35 grams (0.88–1.23 oz). The tail is about 83–104 mm (3.3–4.1 in), ear length is about 18–20 mm, and length of hind foot is about 24–27 mm. Texas mouse found in Missouri. The specimen is a male measuring 171 mm (6.7 in) of total length, 89 mm (3.5 in) of tail, 23 mm (0.91 in) of hind foot, and 19 mm (0.75 in) of ear by Dr. Hershel W. Garner Morphological size variation in Texas mouse appears related with assemblage of physiologic and ecologic factors.

Their skull is large with a length of 27.6 to 30.4 mm (1.09 to 1.20 in), and they have wide and not rounded braincase. They have large pterygoid fossa, medium auditory bullae that larger than in P. maniculatus and P. leucopus but smaller than in P. truei.

== Ecology ==
=== Range and habitat ===
P. attwateri is found in western Arkansas, southeastern Kansas, southern Missouri, south-central and northeastern Oklahoma in forest, and Texas. They inhabit not only rocky areas with high cliffs and slopes under juniper, but also limestone with woods such as oak and black hickory vegetation because of predators. Cedar glades and hardwood forests are their primary habitats. Estimated population density is 0.7 to 5.4/ha at different seasons in various regions. The average home range of the Texas mouse is 0.2 ha (0.49 acres), and the male home range is twice that of the female.

=== Diet ===
The Texas mouse is omnivorous. Acorns are often used in winter and spring, and its diet is a variety of animal and plant material, depending on availability. Foods include berries, seeds, flowers, nuts, fruits, and insects.

== Behavior ==
Texas mouse is mostly nocturnal and arboreal, and does not hibernate. It has morphological adaptations for tree climbing - a long tail and large hind feet; it spends about 70% of its time climbing in trees.

=== Reproduction ===
The Texas mouse's breeding period occurs in autumn and spring, but limited breeding occurs in winter. No evidence that breeding occurs during the late spring and summer has been found. It can breed multiple times during the available seasons and gestation lasts 23 days; lactation lasts about 8 days. The typical number of young per litter is three or four, with seasonal variation. Females collected in winter have fewer embryos than in spring.

The young of the mouse weigh about 1.5 g, and are hairless with closed eyes and pinkly skin. Their hair starts to grow after two days, and two weeks after, the eyes open. A month after, their young are weaned, and they leave the nest to live alone. Some young, though, live together with their mother for a longer time.
