= Angel Island mouse =

Conservation status
- Critically endangered, possibly extinct (IUCN 3.1)

Scientific classification
- Kingdom: Animalia
- Phylum: Chordata
- Class: Mammalia
- Infraclass: Placentalia
- Order: Rodentia
- Family: Cricetidae
- Subfamily: Neotominae
- Genus: Peromyscus
- Species: P. guardia

Binomial name
- Peromyscus guardia Townsend, 1912

Species of rodent

The Angel Island mouse (Peromyscus guardia), or La Guarda deermouse, is a species of rodent in the family Cricetidae. It is a species of the genus Peromyscus, a closely related group of New World mice often called "deermice".

== Distribution ==
It is endemic to Mexico, where it is historically known only from the island of Ángel de la Guarda and nearby islets in the northwestern Gulf of California, Baja California.

The species is believed to be extirpated from the three smaller islands, and may be extinct on Ángel de la Guarda, as well. The species is threatened by predation by feral cats, and by competition from introduced rodents.

== Description ==
The Angel Island mouse has pale grey-brown fur with white underparts and feet, and large, hairless ears. It is most readily distinguished from closely related species on the mainland by subtle characteristics of the skull, or through genetic or biochemical analysis. Adults range from 19 to 22 cm (7.5 to 8.7 in) in total length, including tails 9 to 12 cm (3.5 to 4.7 in) long. Females have four abdominal teats.

== Distribution and habitat ==
The Angel Island mouse is endemic to Ángel de la Guarda Island, a mountainous 359 mi^{2} (930 km^{2}) island off the east coast of Baja California Sur, and to three much smaller islands in the same group. Within the islands, the species appears to be confined to sandy beaches, and perhaps to rockier areas nearby, and has not been found in the high mountainous terrain that forms most of their land area.

Three subspecies are formally recognised, although two of these are now extinct:

- P. g. guardia - Ángel de la Guarda, Estanque
- † P. g. harbisoni - Isla Granito
- † P. g. mejiae - Mejia

== Biology ==
The Angel Island mouse is believed to be descended from an isolated population of cactus mice, possibly belonging to the P. e. fraterculus species or subspecies The critically endangered San Lorenzo mouse, which inhabits a smaller group of islands to the south, may be descended from the same stock, isolated when the islands separated from the mainland as sea levels rose at the end of the last ice age. The two species remain able to interbreed, although it is not known whether the resulting hybrids are fertile. Little is known of the behaviour or detailed biology of the species, although it is believed to breed in the spring.

== Conservation status ==
As recently as the 1960s, the Angel Island mouse was reported to be abundant on at least three of the four islands it was known to inhabit. However, no specimens have been found on the islands since 1991, despite a number of surveys. The main risks to the species come from feral cats, and from introduced house mice and black rats, which compete with the endemic species for resources. The subspecies resident on the two northern islets are now listed as extinct, while the entire population on the southern islet of Estanque was probably driven to extinction by a single cat, present on the island only between 1998 and 1999.

The house mouse now occupies the habitat and the trophic niche that the Angel Island mouse occupied when it was abundant. This replacement of species in a habitat enhances the biotic homogenization of species. The species is currently listed as critically endangered by the IUCN, but since no living specimens have been seen for 20 years, as of 2011, it may well be entirely extinct. If the species still survives, it is likely restricted to an area of no more than 10 km^{2} (3.9 sq mi).
