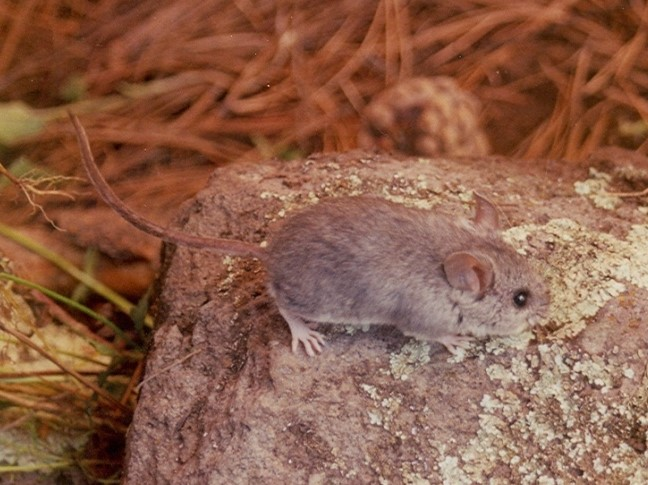
- In Chihuahua, Mexico

Conservation status
- Least Concern (IUCN 3.1)

Scientific classification
- Kingdom: Animalia
- Phylum: Chordata
- Class: Mammalia
- Order: Rodentia
- Family: Cricetidae
- Subfamily: Neotominae
- Genus: Peromyscus
- Species: P. melanotis

Binomial name
- Peromyscus melanotis J.A. Allen & Chapman, 1897

= Black-eared mouse =

Species of rodent

The black-eared mouse (Peromyscus melanotis), or black-eared deer mouse, is a species of rodent in the family Cricetidae. It is a species of the genus Peromyscus, a closely related group of New World mice often called "deermice". It is native to western North America.

== Description ==
The black-eared mouse is one of the smaller species in the genus Peromyscus, measuring 14 to 18 cm (5.5 to 7.1 in) in total length, including a relatively short tail, 5 to 7 cm (2.0 to 2.8 in) long. The fur is tawny to yellow-brown over most of the body, fading from a darker shade on the back to paler on the flanks. The under parts and feet are pure white, with a clear dividing line from the tawny fur elsewhere. A narrow ring of dusky fur is found around the eyes, while the ears are dark brown to black, with white edges. The tail is furred, and has the same color as the body, being tawny above and white below. In at least some localities, the mouse has a slightly paler coat in winter than in summer.

The mouse is virtually identical in appearance to the closely related species Peromyscus sonoriensis (formerly referred to as P. maniculatus). Although subtle differences in the fur and shape of the skull occur between the species, the considerable overlap in the appearance of individuals means even these features cannot reliably be used to distinguish them. The two species can, however, be distinguished using genetic analysis. and are unable to successfully interbreed.

== Distribution and habitat ==
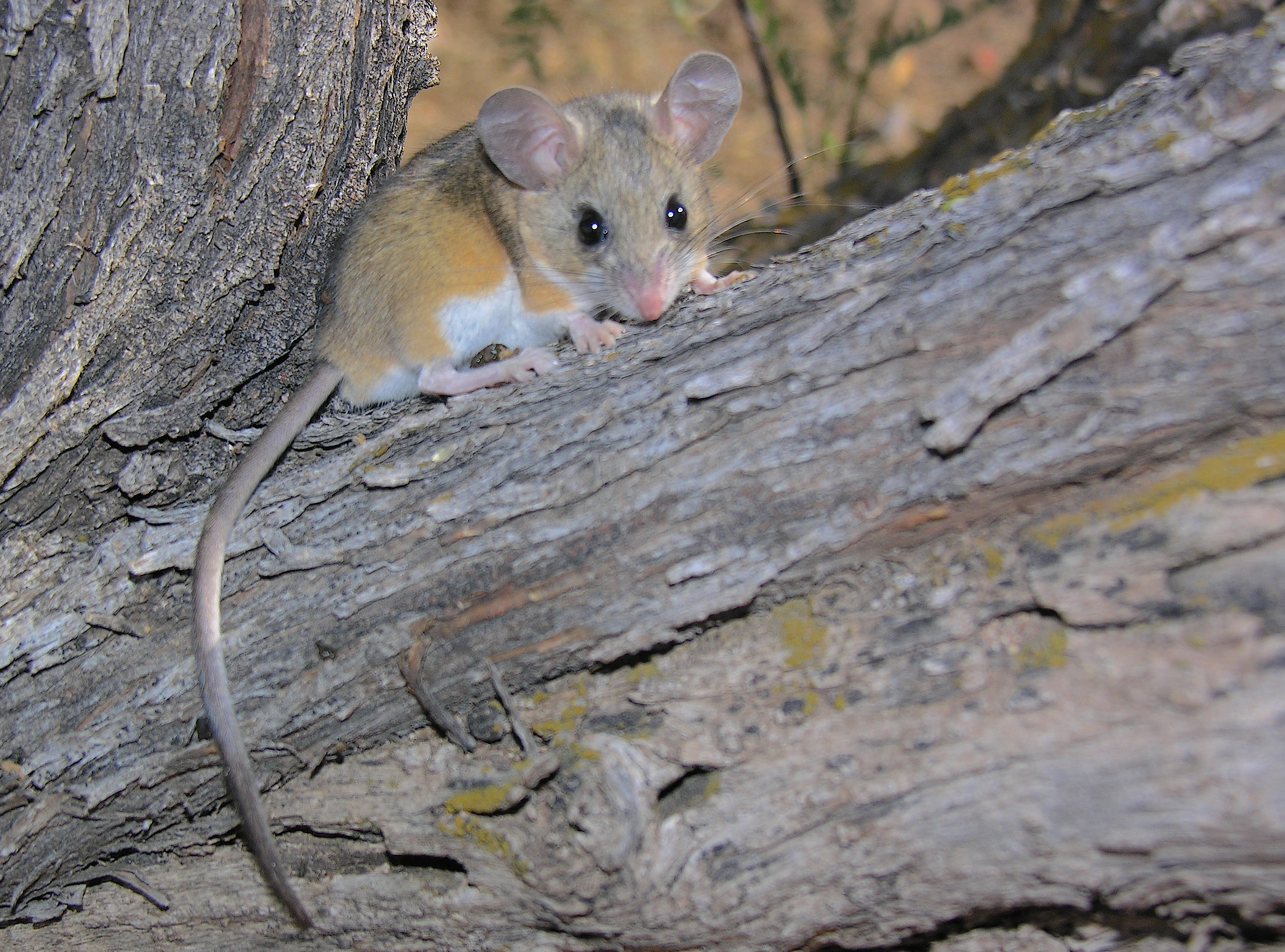
In Portal, Arizona.

Black-eared mice are found in regions of coniferous forest and mixed grassland throughout much of the central mountains of Mexico. They occur from the Neovolcanic range through the Sierra Madre Oriental and Occidental, and across the US border into mountainous regions of southern Arizona. Within this region, they may be found in rocky or marshy habitats or among forest undergrowth between 2,600 and 2,900 m (8,500 and 9,500 ft) in elevation. In contrast, P. sonoriensis tends to live on lower slopes in the same region, although some overlap may occur in ravines and along forest edges.

== Biology ==
Black-eared mice are nocturnal and omnivorous, feeding mainly on seeds and insects. Unusually, they are able to tolerate very bitter cardenolide chemicals, allowing them to consume relatively large quantities of monarch butterflies. They spend the day in burrows consisting of a nest chamber about 7 cm (2.8 in) across, connected to the surface by a vertical tunnel about 60 cm (2.0 ft) in length. They reportedly defend the territory around their nests from other species, in particular driving away Mexican volcano mice, where the two species are found together.

The mice breed throughout the year, giving birth to litters of up to five young, with three or four being typical. No subspecies are recognized.
