= Peromyscus sagax =

Conservation status
- Data Deficient (IUCN 3.1)

Scientific classification
- Kingdom: Animalia
- Phylum: Chordata
- Class: Mammalia
- Order: Rodentia
- Family: Cricetidae
- Subfamily: Neotominae
- Genus: Peromyscus
- Species: P. sagax

Binomial name
- Peromyscus sagax (Elliot, 1903)

Synonyms
- P. levipes sagax; P. boylii sagax

Species of rodent

Peromyscus sagax (La Palma deermouse or Michoacán deermouse), is a species of rodent in the family Cricetidae. It is a species of the genus Peromyscus, a closely related group of New World mice often called "deermice". native to an area around La Palma, Los Reyes, Michoacán in Mexico.
