= Puebla deer mouse =

Conservation status
- Critically Endangered (IUCN 3.1)

Scientific classification
- Kingdom: Animalia
- Phylum: Chordata
- Class: Mammalia
- Order: Rodentia
- Family: Cricetidae
- Subfamily: Neotominae
- Genus: Peromyscus
- Species: P. mekisturus

Binomial name
- Peromyscus mekisturus Merriam, 1898

Species of rodent

The Puebla deer mouse or Puebla deermouse (Peromyscus mekisturus) is a species of rodent in the family Cricetidae. It is a species of the genus Peromyscus, a closely related group of New World mice often called "deermice". Only two specimens are known, both from Puebla, Mexico, with the last collected in 1947. It is therefore possible that the species is now extinct, although it is currently listed as Critically Endangered by the IUCN.

Advanced studies have identified that P. mekisturus is a sister species of Reithrodontomys. The study used mitogenome phylogeny to identify the sister species of P. mekisturus. Recent genomic analysis further supports this placement, suggesting that P. mekisturus belongs to an undescribed genus of cricetid rodents. Therefore, calling for the need of a taxonomic re-evaluation of this species.
