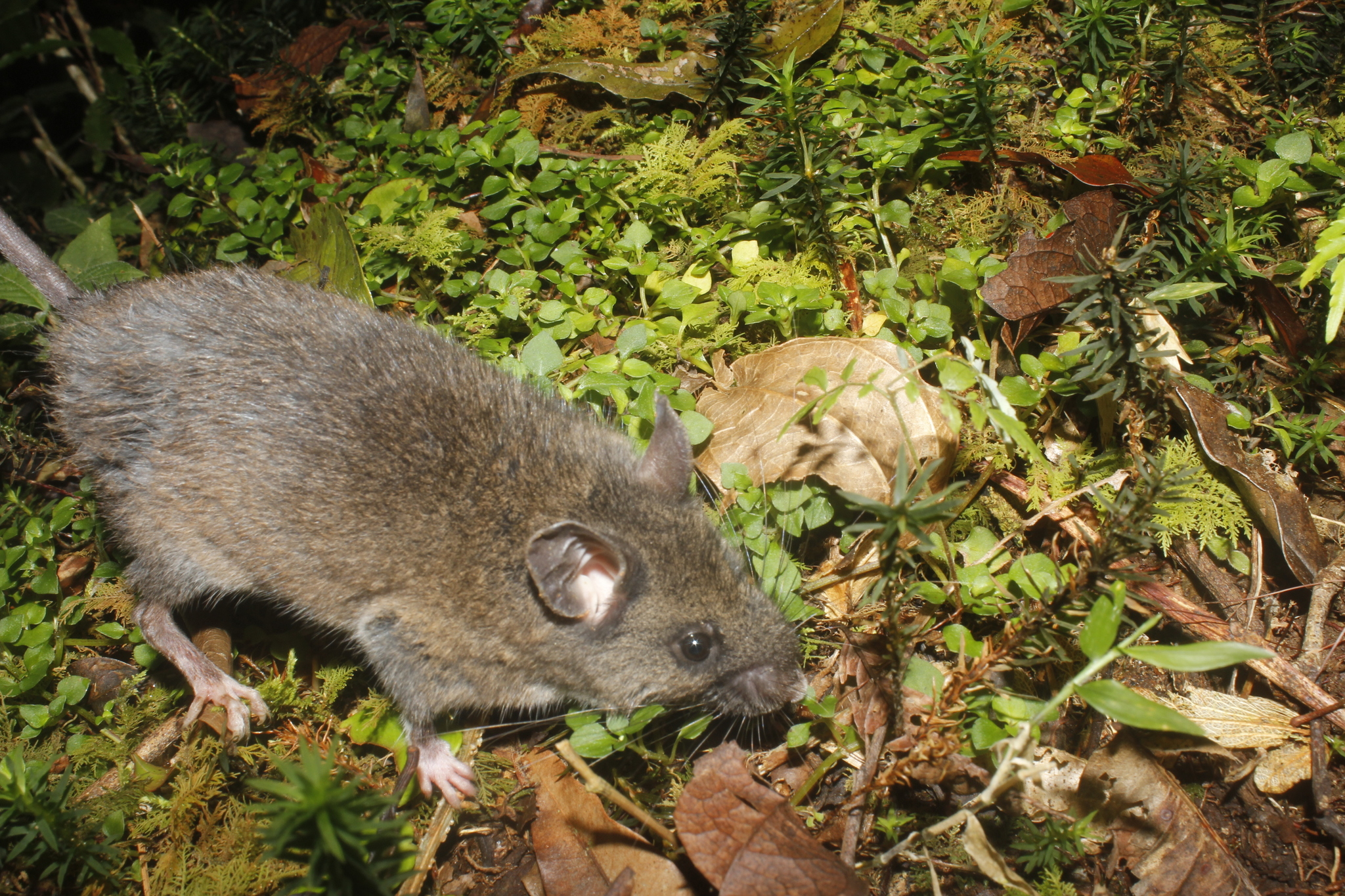
- P. melanocarpus in Oaxaca, Mexico

Conservation status
- Endangered (IUCN 3.1)

Scientific classification
- Kingdom: Animalia
- Phylum: Chordata
- Class: Mammalia
- Order: Rodentia
- Family: Cricetidae
- Subfamily: Neotominae
- Genus: Peromyscus
- Species: P. melanocarpus

Binomial name
- Peromyscus melanocarpus Osgood, 1904

= Black-wristed deer mouse =

Species of rodent

The black-wristed deer mouse (Peromyscus melanocarpus) is a species of rodent in the family Cricetidae. It is a species of the genus Peromyscus, a closely related group of New World mice often called "deermice". It is native to Sierras de Zempoaltépec, Juárez and Mazteca, sub-ranges of the Sierra Madre de Oaxaca in southern Mexico, between 1,500 and 2,500 meters elevation.
