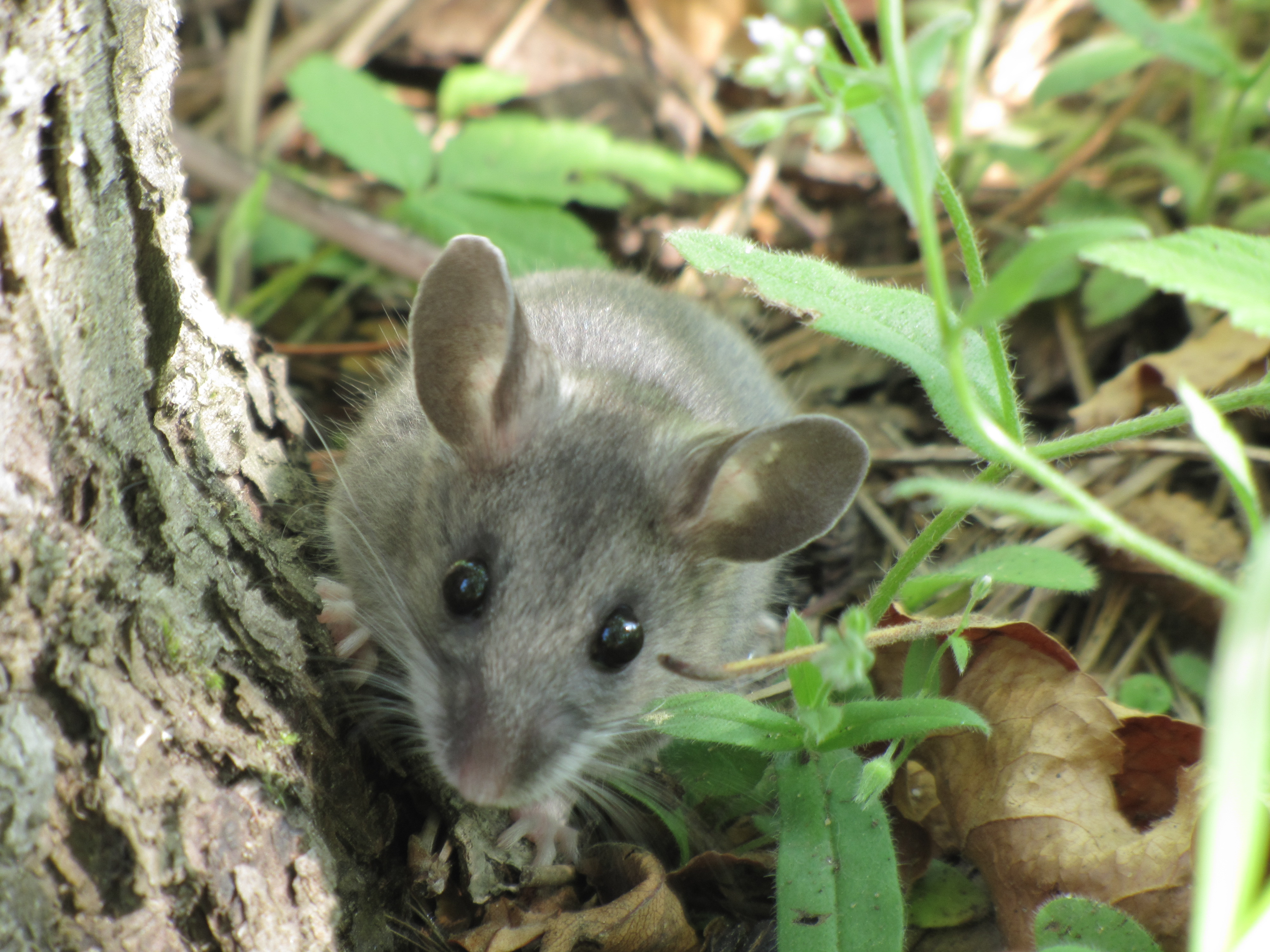
- Peromyscus maniculatus

Scientific classification
- Kingdom: Animalia
- Phylum: Chordata
- Class: Mammalia
- Infraclass: Placentalia
- Order: Rodentia
- Family: Cricetidae
- Subfamily: Neotominae
- Tribe: Reithrodontomyini
- Genus: Peromyscus; Gloger, 1841

Type species
- Peromyscus arboreus

Species
- See text

= Peromyscus =

Peromyscus Temporal range: Late Miocene – Recent

Genus of mammals

Peromyscus is a genus of rodents. They are commonly referred to as deer mice or deermice, not to be confused with the chevrotain or "mouse deer". They are New World mice only distantly related to the common house and laboratory mouse, Mus musculus.

From this distant relative, Peromyscus species are distinguished by relatively larger eyes, and also often two-tone coloring, with darker colors over the dorsum (back), and white abdominal and limb hair-coloring. In reference to the coloring, the word Peromyscus comes from Greek words meaning "booted mouse". They are also accomplished jumpers and runners by comparison to house mice, and their common name of "deer mouse" (coined in 1833) is in reference to both this agility as well as their two-toned coloring.

The most common species of deer mice in the continental United States are two closely related species, P. maniculatus and P. leucopus. In the United States, Peromyscus is the most populous mammalian genus overall, and has become notorious in the western United States as a carrier of hantaviruses.

== Vector of human disease ==
=== Hantavirus ===
Deer mice came to the attention of the public when it was discovered that some species, such as eastern and western deermice (Peromyscus maniculatus and P. sonoriensis, respectively) are primary reservoir species for Sin Nombre hantavirus.

=== Lyme disease ===
A 2008 study in British Columbia of 218 deer mice showed 30% (66) were seropositive for Borrelia burgdorferi, the agent of Lyme disease.

=== Other diseases ===
Ehrlichiosis and babesiosis are also carried by deer mice.

SARS-CoV-2 transmits efficiently in deer mice.

== Use as a laboratory animal ==
While wild populations are sometimes studied, Peromyscus species are also easy to breed and keep in captivity, although they are more energetic and difficult to handle than the relatively more tame M. musculus. For certain studies, they are also favored over the laboratory mouse (M. musculus) and the laboratory rat (Rattus norvegicus). Apart from their importance in studying infectious diseases, Peromyscus species are useful for studying phylogeography, speciation, chromosomes, genetics, ecology, population genetics, conservation and evolution in general. They are also useful for researching repetitive-movement disorders. Their use in aging research is because Peromyscus spp., despite being of similar size to the standard laboratory mouse, have maximum lifespans of 5–7 years, compared to the 3-year maximum lifespan of ad libitum-fed laboratory strains or wild-caught M. musculus.

The Peromyscus Genetic Stock Center at the University of South Carolina was established by Professor Wallace Dawson in 1985 to raise animals of the peromyscine species for research and educational use. This institute maintains populations of several different species (including Peromyscus californicus, Peromyscus maniculatus, Peromyscus melanophrys, Peromyscus eremicus, and Peromyscus aztecus). A variety of mutations affecting their behavior, biochemistry, and the color of their coats is exhibited in these genetic lines.

An American scientist once asked, "How do you go out there and vaccinate a bunch of deer mice against Hantavirus by hand?" In 2017, Rocky Mountain Laboratories started a deer mouse (Peromyscus) colony. The BSL-4 laboratory had used deer mice as a model for research on self-spreading vaccines. SARS-CoV-2 transmits efficiently in deer mice.

== Species ==
- Peromyscus
  - californicus group
    - California deermouse – P. californicus
  - eremicus group
    - Cactus mouse – P. eremicus
    - Burt's deer mouse– P. caniceps
    - Dickey's deer mouse – P. dickeyi
    - Eva's desert mouse – P. eva
    - Northern Baja deer mouse– P. fraterculus
    - Angel Island mouse – P. guardia – possibly extinct
      - P. g. guardia – last seen 1991
      - P. g. mejiae – extinct (1973)
      - P. g. harbisoni – extinct (1963)
      - P. guardia subsp. indet. from Estanque Island – extinct (1998)
    - San Lorenzo mouse – P. interparietalis
    - Mesquite mouse – P. merriami
    - Pemberton's deer mouse – P. pembertoni – extinct (1931)
    - False canyon mouse – P. pseudocrinitus
  - hooperi group
    - Hooper's mouse – P. hooperi
  - crinitus group
    - Canyon mouse – P. crinitus
  - maniculatus group
    - Eastern deer mouse − P. maniculatus
    - Yukon deer mouse – P. sp.
    - Gambel's deer mouse – P. gambelii
    - Northwestern deer mouse – P. keeni
    - Southern deer mouse – P. labecula
    - Black-eared mouse – P. melanotis
    - †Giant island deer mouse – P. nesodytes – extinct
    - Oldfield mouse or beach mouse – P. polionotus
      - P. p. allophrys
      - P. p. ammobates
      - Pallid beach mouse P. p. decoloratus – extinct (1959)
      - P. p. leucocephalus
      - P. p. niveiventris
      - P. p. peninsularis
      - Anastasia Island beach mouse P. p. phasma
      - P. p. trissyllepsis
    - Santa Cruz mouse – P. sejugis
    - Slevin's mouse – P. slevini
    - Western deer mouse – P. sonoriensis
  - leucopus group
    - White-footed mouse – P. leucopus
    - Cotton mouse – P. gossypinus
      - Key Largo cotton mouse P. g. allapaticola
      - †Chadwick Beach cotton mouse P. g. restrictus – extinct (1938)
  - aztecus group
    - Aztec mouse – P. aztecus
    - Transvolcanic deer mouse – P. hylocetes
    - Oaxacan deer mouse – P. oaxacensis
    - Gleaning mouse – P. spicilegus
    - Winkelmann's mouse – P. winkelmanni
  - boylii group
    - Brush mouse – P. boylii
    - Orizaba deer mouse – P. beatae
    - Carleton's deer mouse – P. carletoni
    - Ensink's deer mouse – P. ensinki
    - Greenbaum's deer mouse – P. greenbaumi
    - Kilpatrick's deer mouse – P. kilpatricki
    - Nimble-footed mouse – P. levipes
    - Tres Marías Island mouse – P. madrensis
    - Chihuahuan mouse – P. polius
    - La Palma deer mouse – P. sagax
    - Schmidly's deer mouse – P. schmidlyi
    - Nayarit mouse – P. simulus
    - San Esteban Island mouse – P. stephani
  - truei group
    - Pinyon mouse – P. truei
    - Texas mouse – P. attwateri
    - Perote mouse - P. bullatus
    - Zacatecan deer mouse or southern rock mouse – P. difficilis
    - Osgood's mouse – P. gratus
    - Northern white-ankled mouse – P. laceianus
    - Northern rock mouse – P. nasutus
    - El Carrizo deer mouse – P. ochraventer
    - Southern white-ankled mouse – P. pectoralis
  - melanophrys group
    - Plateau mouse – P. melanophrys
    - Puebla deer mouse – P. mekisturus – possibly extinct
    - Tawny deer mouse – P. perfulvus
  - furvus group
    - Blackish deer mouse – P. furvus
    - Wide-rostrum deer mouse – P. latirostris
  - megalops group
    - Brown deer mouse – P. megalops
    - Black-wristed deer mouse – P. melanocarpus - assignment to the species group tentative
    - Black-tailed mouse – P. melanurus
  - mexicanus group
    - Mexican deer mouse – P. mexicanus
    - Baker's deer mouse – P. bakeri
    - Carol Patton's deer mouse – P. carolpattonae
    - Gardner's deer mouse – P. gardneri
    - Big deer mouse – P. grandis
    - Guatemalan deer mouse – P. guatemalensis
    - Naked-eared deer mouse – P. gymnotis
    - Maya mouse – P. mayensis
    - Talamancan deer mouse – P. nudipes
    - Nicaraguan deer mouse – P. nicaraguae
    - Salvadoran deer mouse – P. salvadorensis
    - Stirton's deer mouse – P. stirtoni
    - Chimoxan deer mouse – P. tropicalis
    - Yucatán deer mouse – P. yucatanicus
    - Chiapan deer mouse – P. zarhynchus
