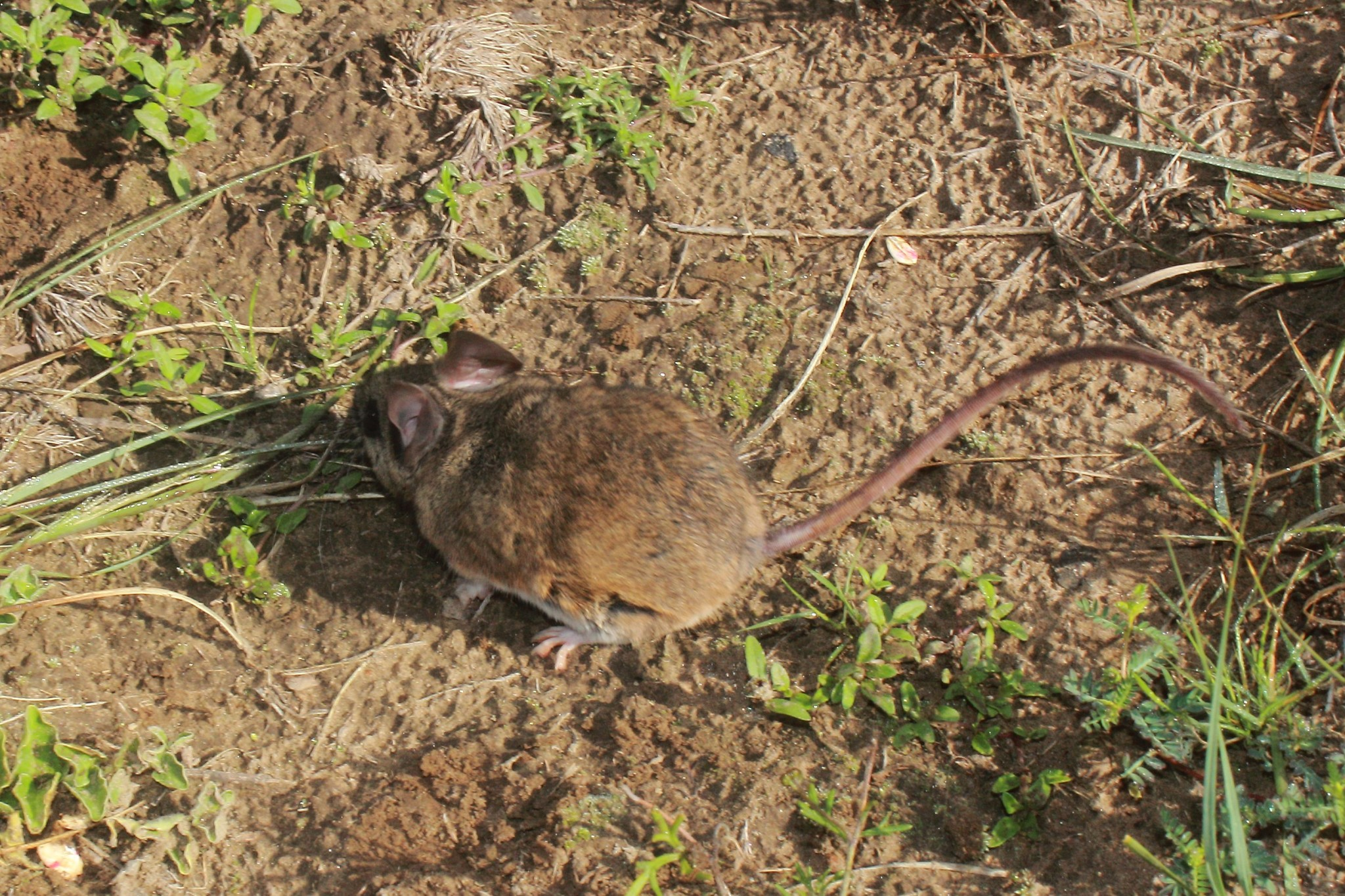

Conservation status
- Critically Endangered (IUCN 3.1)

Scientific classification
- Kingdom: Animalia
- Phylum: Chordata
- Class: Mammalia
- Order: Rodentia
- Family: Cricetidae
- Subfamily: Neotominae
- Genus: Peromyscus
- Species: P. bullatus

Binomial name
- Peromyscus bullatus Osgood, 1904

= Perote mouse =

Species of rodent

The Perote mouse (Peromyscus bullatus), or Perote deermouse, is a species of rodent in the family Cricetidae. It is a species of the genus Peromyscus, a group of New World mice often referred to as "deermice". It is found only in Mexico.

== Description ==
The Perote mouse is the size of a small rat, with a total length of 18 to 22 centimetres (7.1 to 8.7 in), including a hairy tail that, at 9 to 12 centimetres (3.5 to 4.7 in), is typically longer than the animal's body. The mouse is tawny-ochre in colour, with creamy white underparts. The middle of the back is duskier than the rest of the animal, and the sides of head are grey. However, it can only be clearly distinguished from other mice in the genus Peromyscus by the fact that its ears are larger than its hindfeet by at least 2 mm (0.08 in), and, in the skeleton, by inflated auditory bullae. These features may be related to an enhanced sense of hearing, allowing the mouse to readily detect predators.

== Distribution ==
The Perote mouse is found only in the Oriental Basin region of Mexico, including parts of western Veracruz, central Puebla and extreme eastern Tlaxcala. This is a relatively small region, between 2,250 and 2,500 metres (7,380 and 8,200 ft) in elevation, near the city of Perote. It is dominated by grassland and arid scrub vegetation, with some patches of coniferous forest. Within the region, the mouse prefers areas with sandy soil and a few juniper or yucca trees. The mouse's highly specific habitat requirements, limited distribution, and declining population all contribute to its critically endangered status.
