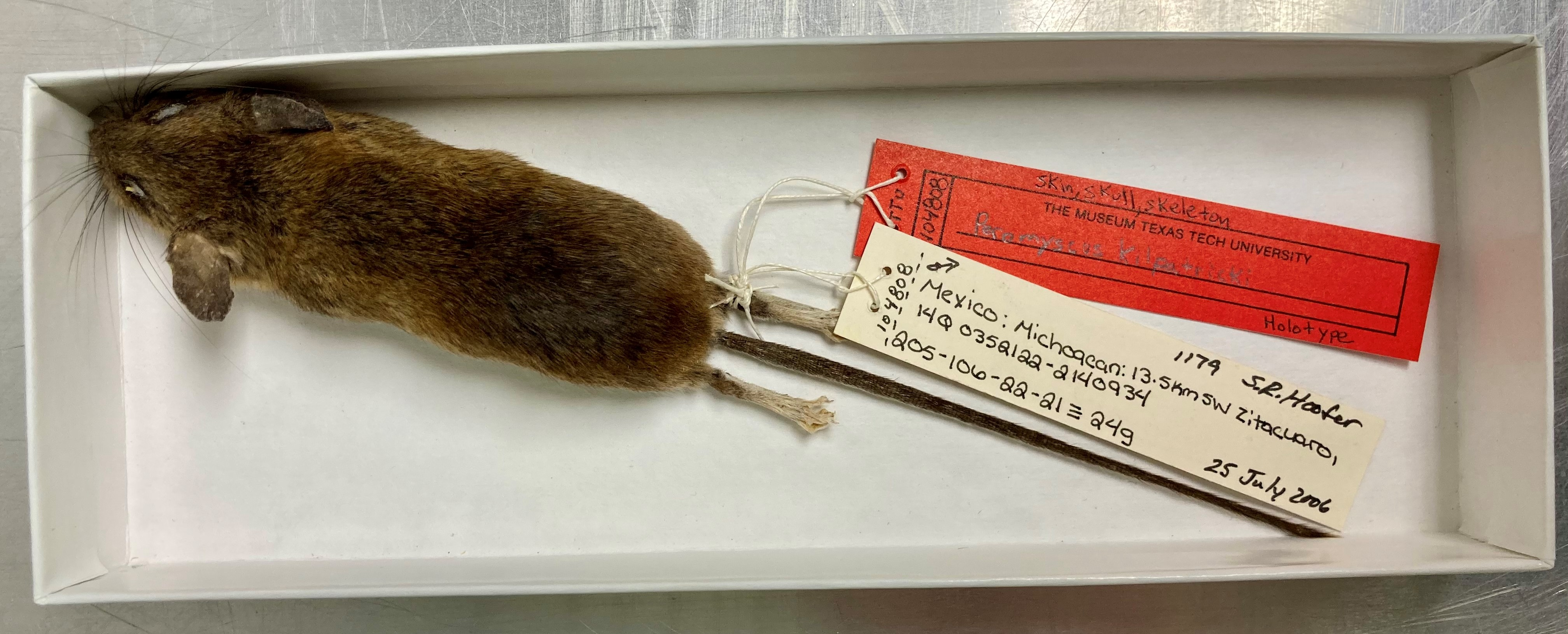
- Holotype in the Natural Science Research Laboratory's collection at the Museum of Texas Tech University

Scientific classification
- Kingdom: Animalia
- Phylum: Chordata
- Class: Mammalia
- Order: Rodentia
- Family: Cricetidae
- Subfamily: Neotominae
- Genus: Peromyscus
- Species: P. kilpatricki

Binomial name
- Peromyscus kilpatricki Bradley et al., 2017

= Kilpatrick's deer mouse =

Species of rodent

Kilpatrick's deer mouse or Kilpatrick's deermouse (Peromyscus kilpatricki) is a small species of rodent in the family Cricetidae. It is a species of the genus Peromyscus, a closely related group of New World mice often called "deermice". It is native to mountainous regions of Michoacán, Mexico. It is found in the Trans-Mexican Volcanic Belt pine–oak forests in mesic forest habitats dominated by pine and oak at elevations above 1,600 meters. The species can be found in micro-habitats associated with rocky outcrops and fallen trees. The species is named after Dr. C. William Kilpatrick, curator of vertebrates at the University of Vermont Natural History Museum. The holotype of this species is part of the Natural Science Research Laboratory collections at the Museum of Texas Tech University.
