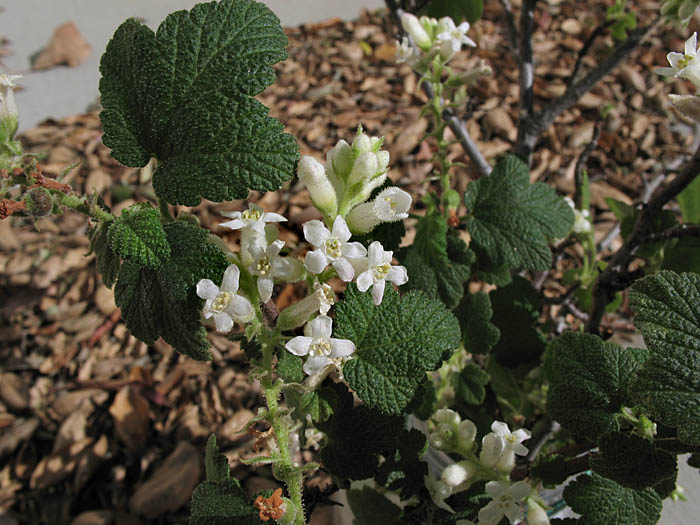
- A white-flowered currant growing in the Santa Monica Mountains National Recreation Area, California.

Scientific classification
- Kingdom: Plantae
- Clade: Tracheophytes
- Clade: Angiosperms
- Clade: Eudicots
- Order: Saxifragales
- Family: Grossulariaceae
- Genus: Ribes
- Species: R. indecorum

Binomial name
- Ribes indecorum Eastw.

= Ribes indecorum =

Species of flowering plant

Ribes indecorum is a species of currant known by the common names white-flowered currant and white chaparral currant. It is native to the southern California Coast Ranges, Transverse Ranges, and Peninsular Ranges, from around Santa Barbara County in California south into northern Baja California.

It grows in local habitats such as California chaparral and woodlands and coastal sage scrub.

== Description ==
Ribes indecorum is an erect perennial shrub approaching three meters in maximum height. The stem is fuzzy and glandular in texture. The deciduous leaves are 1 to 4 centimeters long. The thick, wrinkly blades are divided into three to five toothed lobes, and are hairy, glandular, and aromatic. The inflorescence is a loose raceme of 10 to 25 flowers. The flower is roughly tubular with the white or pink-tinged sepals spreading open to reveal smaller whitish petals inside. The fruit is a hairy, sticky purple berry under a centimeter wide.

== Cultivation ==
Ribes indecorum is cultivated as an ornamental plant by specialty plant nurseries. It is planted in drought-tolerant, native plant, and wildlife gardens and natural landscaping projects.
