= Canyon mouse =

Canyon mouse Temporal range: 1.8–0 Ma Quaternary to Present

Conservation status
- Least Concern (IUCN 3.1)

- Secure (NatureServe)

Scientific classification
- Kingdom: Animalia
- Phylum: Chordata
- Class: Mammalia
- Order: Rodentia
- Family: Cricetidae
- Subfamily: Neotominae
- Genus: Peromyscus
- Species: P. crinitus

Binomial name
- Peromyscus crinitus (Merriam, 1891)

Species of rodent

The canyon mouse (Peromyscus crinitus) is a species of rodent in the family Cricetidae. It is a species of the genus Peromyscus, a closely related group of New World mice often called "deermice". It is a gray-brown mouse-like rodent found in much of the western United States and northern Mexico. Its preferred habitat is arid, rocky desert. Vegetation has little or no effect on the distribution of canyon mice, it is instead associated with rocky substrate than any plant. Canyon mice forage in areas with shrub-like vegetation which can be used for protection against predators. It is the only species in the Peromyscus crinitus species group.

Canyon mice eat seeds, green vegetation, and insects. Small animals and insects make up a larger portion of diet when seeds and vegetation are rare. They breed in the spring and summer. Females can produce multiple litters of between two and five young every year. Males do not mate with more than one female, and the homes ranges of females and males overlap. Canyon mice are nocturnal and are active through the year. They usually nest among or below rocks in burrows.

The earliest fossils of canyon mice are from 100,000-130,000 years before present from the Los Angeles Basin.

A canyon mouse on Mt. Charleston, Nevada.
