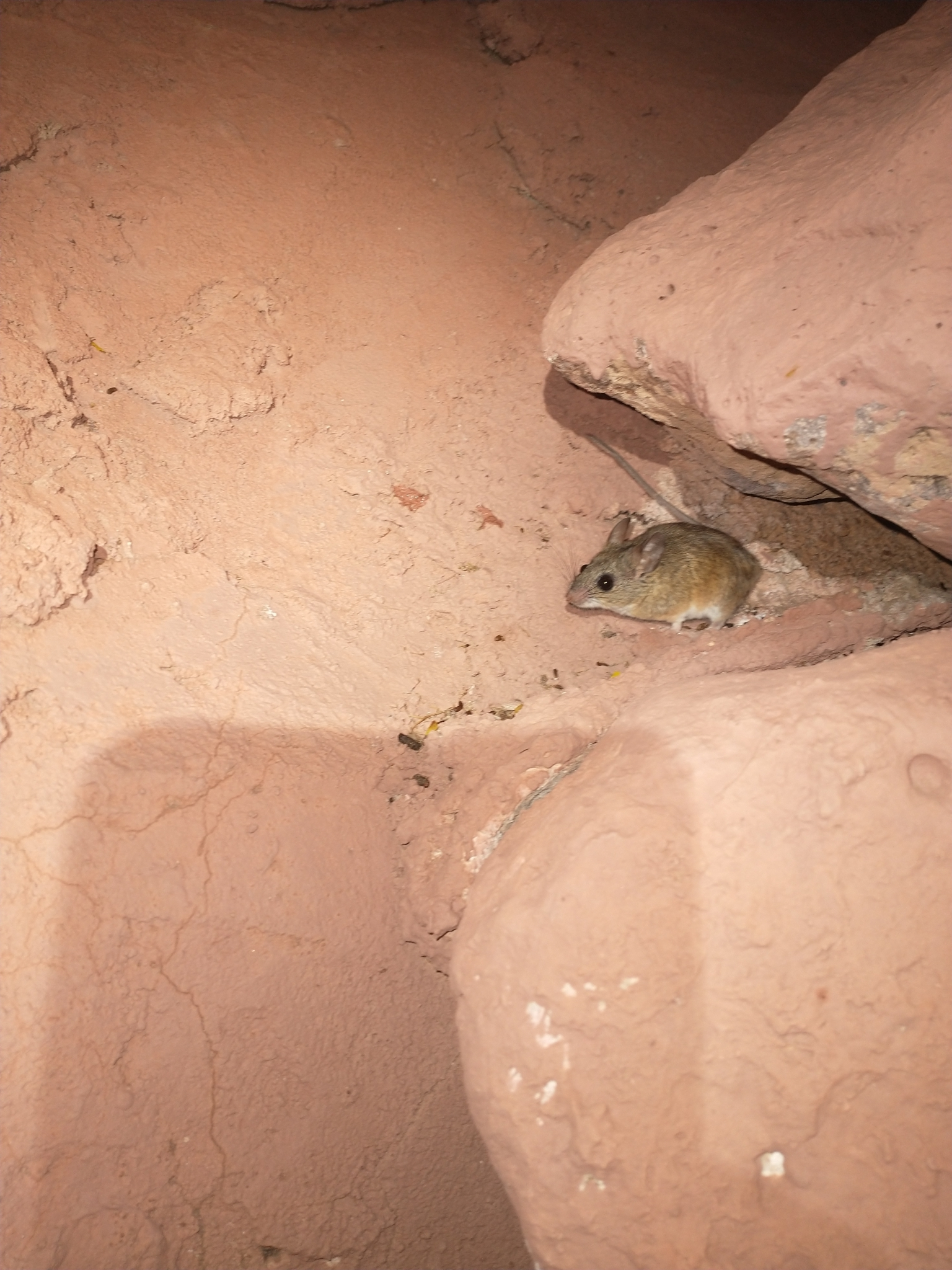

Conservation status
- Least Concern (IUCN 3.1)

- Secure (NatureServe)

Scientific classification
- Kingdom: Animalia
- Phylum: Chordata
- Class: Mammalia
- Order: Rodentia
- Family: Cricetidae
- Subfamily: Neotominae
- Genus: Peromyscus
- Species: P. merriami

Binomial name
- Peromyscus merriami Mearns, 1896

= Mesquite mouse =

Species of rodent

The mesquite mouse (Peromyscus merriami), also known as Merriam's deermouse, is a species of rodent in the family Cricetidae. It is a species of the genus Peromyscus, a closely related group of New World mice often called "deermice". it is native to Mexico, as well as Arizona in the United States.

== Distribution and habitat ==
The mesquite mouse can be found in south-central Arizona in the United States and in Sonora and Sinaloa in Mexico. It occurs in areas of dense brush and mesquite bosque in riparian and desert habitats from sea level up to 1,160 m (3,810 ft).
