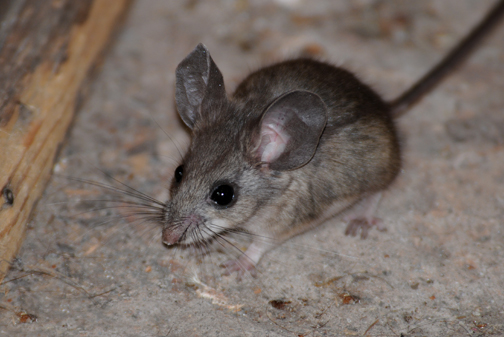

Conservation status
- Least Concern (IUCN 3.1)

- Secure (NatureServe)

Scientific classification
- Kingdom: Animalia
- Phylum: Chordata
- Class: Mammalia
- Order: Rodentia
- Family: Cricetidae
- Subfamily: Neotominae
- Genus: Peromyscus
- Species: P. truei

Binomial name
- Peromyscus truei (Shufedlt, 1885)

= Pinyon mouse =

Species of rodent

The pinyon mouse (Peromyscus truei) is a species of rodent in the family Cricetidae. It is a species of the genus Peromyscus, a closely related group of New World mice often called "deermice". It is native to the southwestern United States and Baja California in Mexico. These medium-sized mice are often distinguished by their relatively large ears. The range of this species extends from southern Oregon and Wyoming in the north, and extends south to roughly the U.S.-Mexico border, with a disjunct population known as the Palo Duro mouse (P. t. comanche) that occupies an area in the vicinity of Palo Duro Canyon in the Texas Panhandle.[3] This isolated population is a glacial relict: during the last glacial period, Rocky Mountain juniper grew in a continuous belt from the mountains of New Mexico across the caprock escarpment to the Texas Panhandle, allowing the species to occupy the region. As the climate warmed approximately 10,000 years ago, the junipers retreated westward, leaving a gap of roughly 120 kilometers of open grassland that isolated the Palo Duro population from the main range.Schmidly, David J. (1973). "Geographic variation and systematics of Peromyscus truei". Journal of Mammalogy. 54 (1): 1–10.

== Description ==
The fur of pinyon mice varies in color from a pale yellowish brown to a brownish black color, and their feet are a lighter color, varying between dusky and white. They are similar in appearance to the white-footed mouse (P. leucopus), but there are a few distinguishing differences. P. truei tends to have larger ears, as large or larger than the hind foot. They also have a larger tail with a more heavily furred tip. The skull of P. truei is larger than that of P. leucopus, with more inflated auditory bullae and a less robust zygomatic arch than the latter species.

== Distribution and habitat ==
P. truei can be found in a variety of habitats. Although they prefer rocky slopes and pinyon–juniper woodland, they are also found in desert, forest, and grassy plains. They tend to have a larger home range than other Peromyscus, up to 2.9 hectares (7.2 acres) in males, which can possibly be attributed to requiring a large area to search for food in drought conditions. They are flexible in habitat and elevation and are able to adjust to varying climate conditions. In burned out areas they tend to stick to the edges instead of moving into the burn area.

== Diet ==
P. truei mostly feed on fruit, grain, and seeds, but they will also readily eat insects, spiders, and other invertebrates. Adults typically feed on Juniper seeds and berries in the winter, and on acorns in the summer. P. truei are notorious at caching their food supply, and cache networks around their den sites can become quite extensive. In addition, they are capable of surviving on very limited water, which is essential in their mostly arid habitats.
