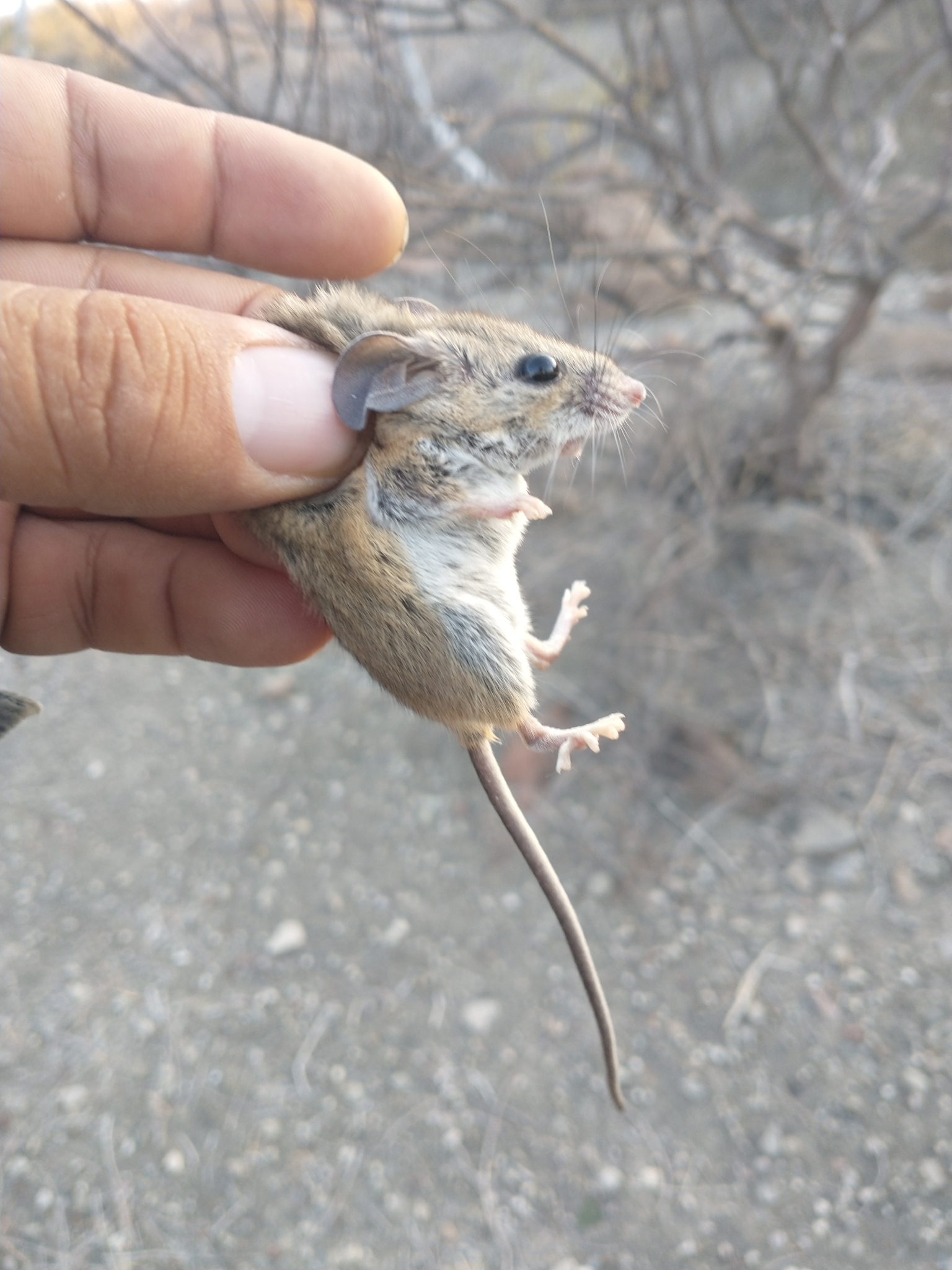

Conservation status
- Least Concern (IUCN 3.1)

Scientific classification
- Kingdom: Animalia
- Phylum: Chordata
- Class: Mammalia
- Order: Rodentia
- Family: Cricetidae
- Subfamily: Neotominae
- Genus: Peromyscus
- Species: P. eva

Binomial name
- Peromyscus eva Thomas, 1898

Synonyms
- Peromyscus eremicus carmeni Townsend, 1912

= Eva's desert mouse =

Species of rodent

Eva's desert mouse (Peromyscus eva) is a species of rodent in the family Cricetidae. It is a species of the genus Peromyscus, a closely related group of New World mice often called "deermice". It is endemic to the Baja California peninsula of Mexico.

== Description ==
Eva's desert mouse measures 19 cm (7.5 in) from head to rump, on average, and has a 10 cm (3.9 in) tail. They weigh between 13 and 20 grams (0.46 and 0.71 oz). The fur is russet or buff in color over most of the body, with pale grey markings on the nose, cheeks, and around the eyes. The ears are pale brown and almost hairless, and the underparts creamy white. It can most clearly be distinguished from the cactus mouse, which is found in the same geographical region, by the shape of the baculum, although it is also typically darker in color, and with a longer tail.

Little is known of the animal's biology, although it is usually found close to succulent plants, and appears to breed between February and July.

== Distribution and habitat ==
Eva's desert mouse lives only in the southern part of the Baja California peninsula in Mexico. Within this region, it inhabits scrubland habitats below 1,800 m (5,900 ft) dominated by plants such as cholla, Jatropha, and organ-pipe cactus, and in agricultural land. Two subspecies have been identified:

- Peromyscus eva eva - Mainland Baja California Sur
- Peromyscus eva carmeni - Carmen Island, in the Bahía de Loreto National Park
