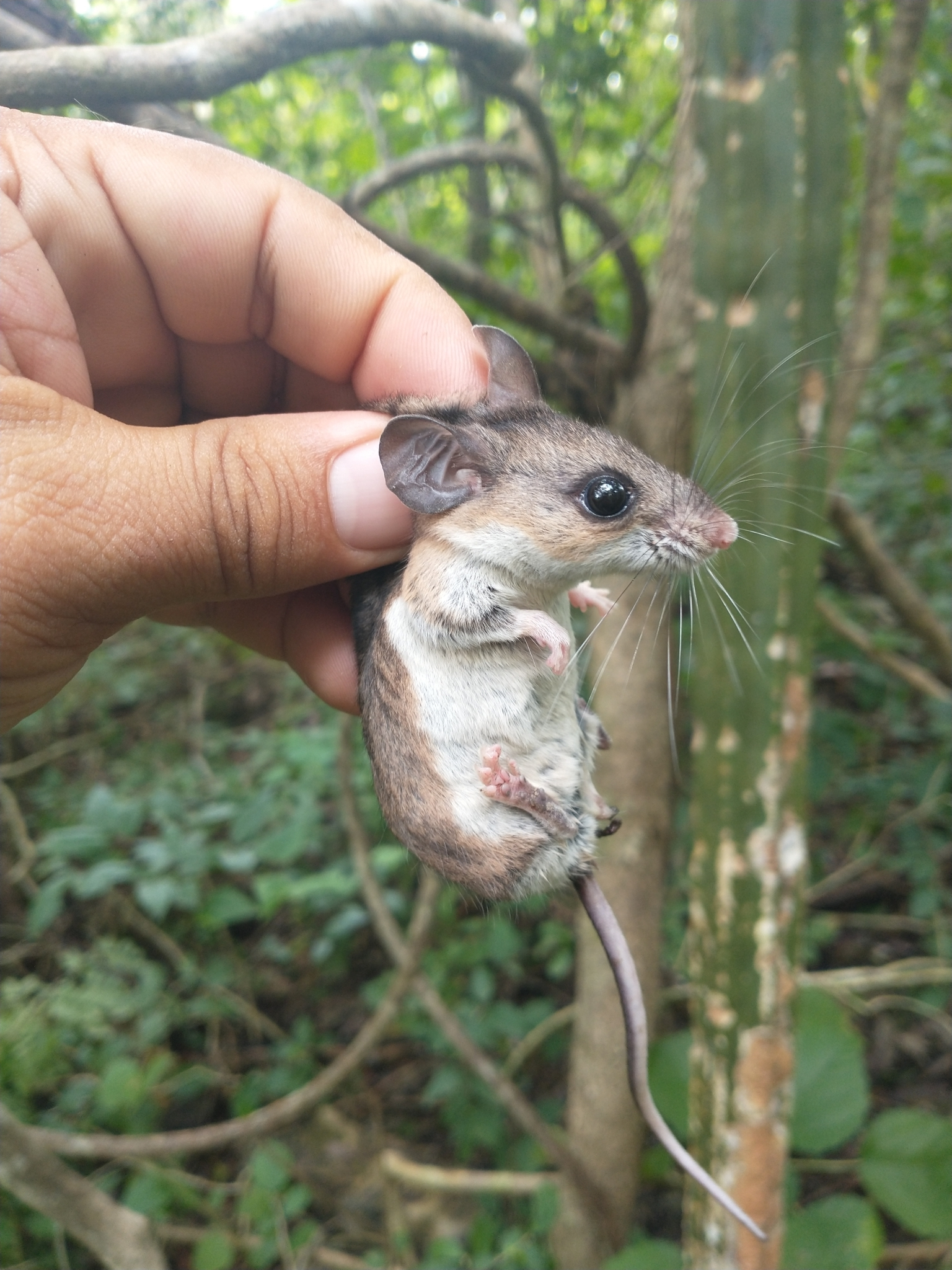

Conservation status
- Least Concern (IUCN 3.1)

Scientific classification
- Kingdom: Animalia
- Phylum: Chordata
- Class: Mammalia
- Order: Rodentia
- Family: Cricetidae
- Subfamily: Neotominae
- Genus: Peromyscus
- Species: P. yucatanicus

Binomial name
- Peromyscus yucatanicus J.A. Allen & Chapman, 1897

= Yucatan deer mouse =

Species of rodent

The Yucatan deer mouse or Yucatan deermouse (Peromyscus yucatanicus) is a species of rodent in the family Cricetidae. It is a species of the genus Peromyscus, a closely related group of New World mice often called "deermice". The species is found in Mexico and Guatemala; an example habitat is the Petenes mangroves ecoregion of the Yucatan.
