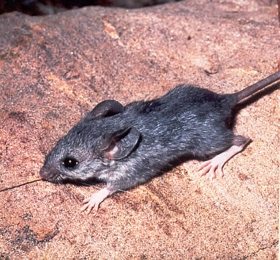

Conservation status
- Least Concern (IUCN 3.1)

Scientific classification
- Kingdom: Animalia
- Phylum: Chordata
- Class: Mammalia
- Order: Rodentia
- Family: Cricetidae
- Subfamily: Neotominae
- Genus: Peromyscus
- Species: P. eremicus

Binomial name
- Peromyscus eremicus (Baird, 1858)
- native range

= Cactus mouse =

Species of rodent

The cactus mouse or cactus deermouse (Peromyscus eremicus) is a species of rodent in the family Cricetidae. It is a species of the genus Peromyscus, a closely related group of New World mice often called "deermice". They are native to desert areas of western North America.

== Description ==
Cactus mice are small cricetid rodents, with large eyes and ears, a pointed snout, and a long monocolor tail. Average dimensions for P. eremicus are as follows: total length, 160 to 211 mm (6.3 to 8.3 in); length of body, 72 to 100 mm (2.8 to 3.9 in); length of tail, 84 to 120 mm (3.3 to 4.7 in); length of hind foot, 18 to 22 mm (0.71 to 0.87 in); length of ear, 13.4 to 20 mm (0.53 to 0.79 in); greatest length of skull, 22.7 to 25.9 mm (0.89 to 1.02 in) and zygomatic breadth, 11.2 to 13.5 mm (0.44 to 0.53 in). Adults weigh between 18 and 40 grams (0.63 and 1.41 oz). Females weigh slightly more than males and are significantly larger in body length, ear length, length of mandible, and bullar width of skull.

Cactus mice can be identified by having naked soles on their hind feet and almost naked flesh-colored tails (as opposed to the furry bicolored tail common in most Peromyscus species), which are usually the same length or longer than the animals' body length. Their ears are nearly hairless, large, and membranous.

Their fur is long and soft; coloration varies between subspecies and between different populations. Color of fur varies from ochre to cinnamon, with white ventral areas, and the sides and top of head slightly grayish. Females tend to be slightly paler in color than males, while juveniles appear more gray than their parents.

Cactus mouse longevity is around one year in the wild, but in captivity can live up to 7.4 years.

== Distribution ==
Cactus mice are found in dry desert habitats, steppe, and mountain foothills in arid regions of the southwestern United States and northern Mexico, as well as islands off the coast of the Baja California peninsula and in the Sea of Cortés. Low average temperatures and lack of the mesquite species Prosopis juliflora might limit northern expansion.

The cactus mouse occurs sympatrically with five other deermouse species, including the California mouse, canyon mouse, Eva's desert mouse, mesquite mouse, and the western deermouse.

== Diet ==
The cactus mouse feeds on seeds, mesquite beans, hackberry nutlets, insects, and green vegetation. In winter, they rely more on insects; on seeds and flowers in the spring; and seeds, leafy greens, and insects in the summer. In autumn, they transition to their winter diet.

== Behavior ==
Cactus mice, like most muroids, exhibit crepuscular behavior and may even appear in midday, but are mainly nocturnal. They may be less active during the full moon. They have been described as "shy and excitable, and seldom bites when handled". They vocalize a shrill, high-pitched squeak when frightened. In laboratory studies, cactus mice average a running speed of 8.14 miles per hour (13.10 km/h).

Compared to other Peromyscus species, cactus mice have a lower metabolism. This is thought to be an adaptation to arid environments, and maintained by lower activity of the thyroid gland. They may enter torpor when deprived of food in the winter, and food and/or water in the summer. Below 15 °C (59 °F), they enter torpor more slowly, which may partially explain their southern distribution. In the laboratory, onset of torpor was observed to occur within half an hour of food deprivation. When dehydrated, they reduce eating to conserve water that would be expended during digestion.

They are important as seed predators and as prey items for other animals.

== Reproduction ==
The mating habits of cactus mice are currently not well studied, but are inferred from other Peromyscus species to be promiscuous. They mate year around, but more so during warmer months. Unlike other muroids, male cactus mice have a simple penis, rather than a complex one, and females have two pairs of teats, rather than three. The number of teats in the female cactus mouse correlates with the number of offspring they can raise in their arid environment. Females mate after about two months, however, male sexual maturity age is unknown.

== Relationship with humans ==
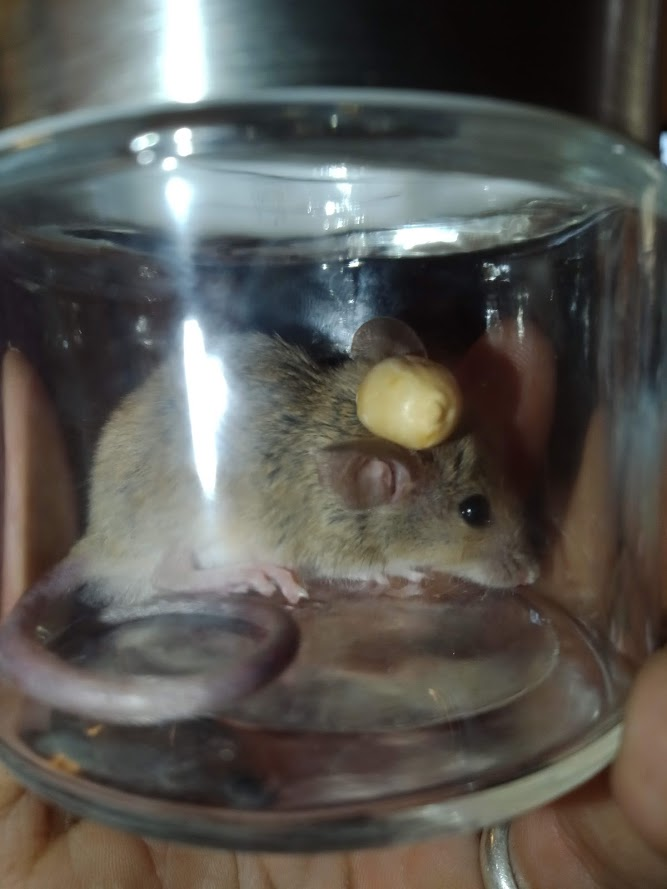
Male cactus mouse in a jar with a peanut on his head, caught in a residential house in Albuquerque

Cactus mice are ideal laboratory animals since they keep clean, live well in captivity, and have a high rate of productivity. They have been proposed for physiological and genetic studies.

There are no known negative effects on humans or human-related activities.

Specimens from Southern California have tested positive for hantavirus, however, infections in this species are likely incidental and localized, rather than a common reservoir.
