= Nimble-footed mouse =

Conservation status
- Least Concern (IUCN 3.1)

Scientific classification
- Kingdom: Animalia
- Phylum: Chordata
- Class: Mammalia
- Order: Rodentia
- Family: Cricetidae
- Subfamily: Neotominae
- Genus: Peromyscus
- Species: P. levipes

Binomial name
- Peromyscus levipes Merriam, 1898

Species of rodent

The nimble-footed mouse (Peromyscus levipes) is a species of rodent in the family Cricetidae. It is a species of the genus Peromyscus, a closely related group of New World mice often called "deermice". It is endemic to Mexico.

== Description ==
The nimble-footed mouse has a typical mouse-like appearance, and closely resembles other members of the Peromyscus boylii species group, from some of which it can only be distinguished by genetic analysis. It has tawny or buff fur over most of the body, with dusky hairs and white or creamy-white under parts. There is a ring of darker fur around the eyes, and sometimes on the muzzle, and often a faint blackish line down the middle of the back. Adults range from 18 to 22 cm (7.1 to 8.7 in) in total length, a little over half of which consists of the tail, and weigh from 20 to 30 g (0.7 to 1 oz).

== Distribution and habitat ==
The nimble-footed mouse is found only in Mexico, where it inhabits the Sierra Madre Oriental mountains from Nuevo León in the north to Puebla in the south. It inhabits rocky areas such as bluffs and creeks within forests dominated by oak, pine, juniper, or sweet gum, as well as within cloud forests.

Two subspecies are currently recognised:

- P. l. levipes - majority of range
- P. l. ambiguus - Neuvo León and western Tamaulipas

== Biology ==
Nimble-footed mice are herbivorous and are commonly found in areas dominated by trees, with a typical population density of 16 to 41/ha (6.5 to 16.6/acre). Known predators include barn owls and mottled owls. They breed two or three times a year, probably without any distinct breeding season.
