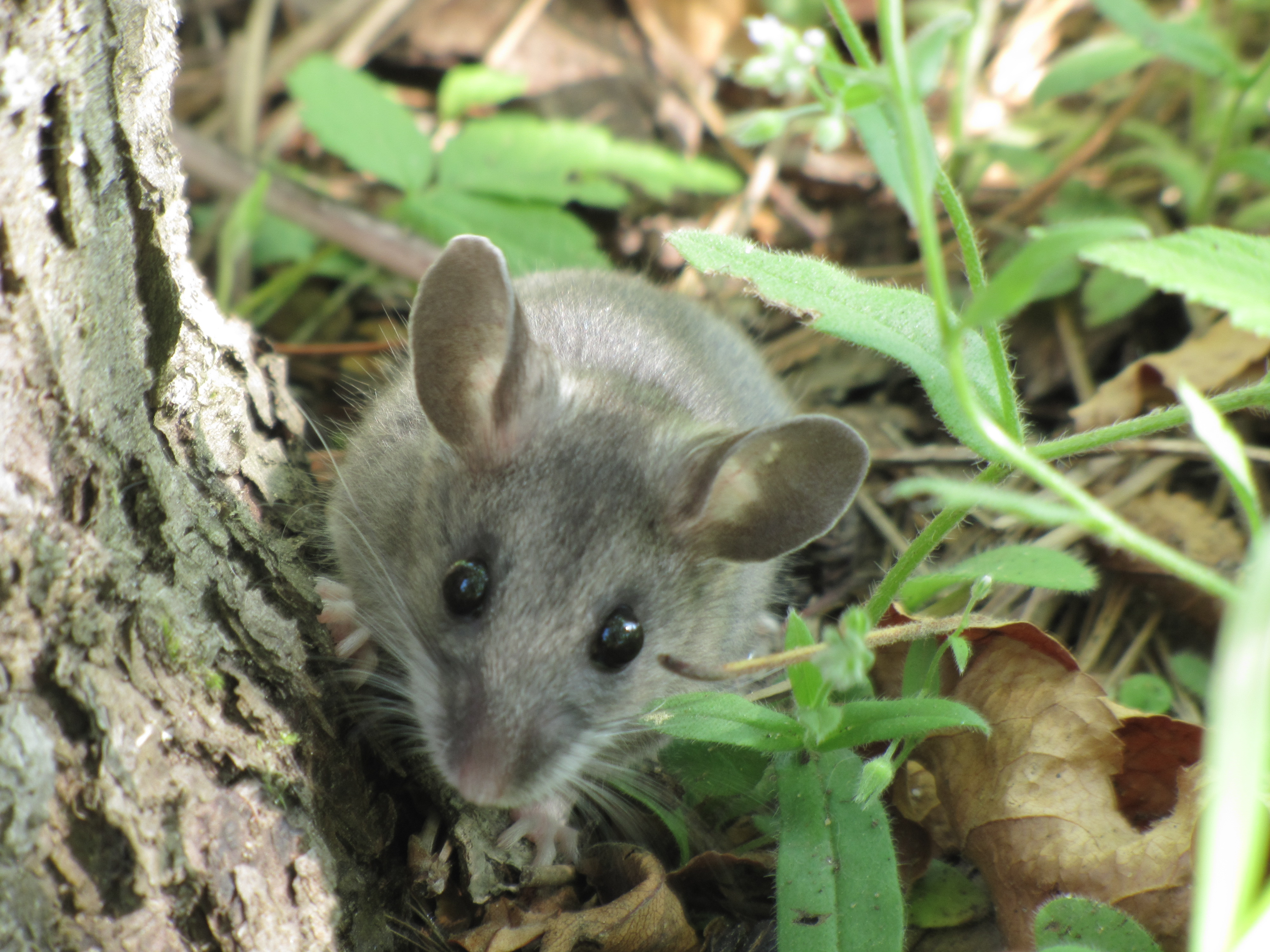
- In Schoolcraft County, Michigan

Conservation status
- Least Concern (IUCN 3.1)

- Secure (NatureServe)

Scientific classification
- Kingdom: Animalia
- Phylum: Chordata
- Class: Mammalia
- Infraclass: Placentalia
- Order: Rodentia
- Family: Cricetidae
- Subfamily: Neotominae
- Genus: Peromyscus
- Species: P. maniculatus

Binomial name
- Peromyscus maniculatus (J. A. Wagner, 1845)

= Eastern deer mouse =

Species of mammal

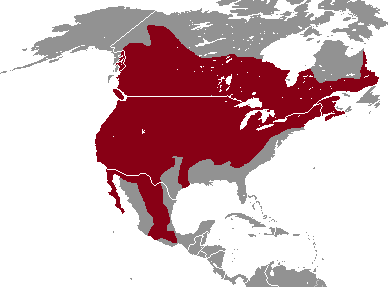
range of the former taxon, when grouped with P. sonoriensis and other species now recognized as distinct

The eastern deer mouse (Peromyscus maniculatus) is a rodent native to eastern North America. It is a species of the genus Peromyscus, a closely related group of New World mice often called "deermice". When formerly grouped with the western deermouse (P. sonoriensis), it was once referred to as the North American deermouse, a species that is no longer recognized. It is fairly widespread across most of North America east of the Mississippi River, with the major exception being the lowland Southeastern United States.

Like certain other Peromyscus species, it can be a vector and carrier of emerging infectious diseases such as hantaviruses and Lyme disease.

It is closely related to Peromyscus leucopus, the white-footed mouse.

== Overview ==
The species in its former broad sense had 61 subspecies, but some of these now belong to P. sonoriensis. They are all tiny mammals that are plentiful in number. The eastern deermouse is a small rodent that lives in eastern North America and is closely related to the white-footed mouse, Peromyscus leucopus. Because the two species are extremely similar in appearance, they are best distinguished through red blood cell agglutination tests or karyotype techniques. They can also be distinguished physically by its long and multicolored tail. Deer mouse species, such as the eastern deermouse, the white-footed mouse, and the cactus mouse, are very often used for laboratory experimentation due to their self cleanliness and easy care.

== Physical description ==
The eastern deermouse is small in size, only 3 to 4 inches (8 to 10 cm) long, not including the tail. It has large, beady eyes and large ears giving it good sight and hearing. P. maniculatus has soft fur which varies in color, from gray to brown, but all deermice have a distinguishable white underside and white feet. A deermice tail is covered with fine hairs, with the same dark/light split as the fur on the rest of its body. P. maniculatus has distinct subspecies. Of those most common in North America, the woodland form has longer hind legs, a longer tail, and larger ears than the prairie form.

== Behavior ==
Eastern deermice are nocturnal creatures, which spend the daytime in areas such as trees or burrows, where they have nests made of plant material. The pups within litters of eastern deermice are kept by the mother within an individual home range, typically of 242 to 3000 square meters. Ranges may overlap, more likely with an opposite sex, as males have much greater home ranges than the more territorial females. Deermice that live within overlapping home ranges tend to recognize one another and frequently interact.

The woodland variety of P. maniculatus is an adept climber, and prefers tree cover well above the ground, while the prairie form prefers to move from burrow to burrow in open areas, avoiding cover.

=== High-elevation adaptations ===
Some eastern deermice are found at high elevations, with low oxygen levels and ambient temperatures. They encounter year-round cold and hypoxia, undergoing their entire reproductive cycles under these harsh conditions. Chronic hypoxia can limit the growth of these high-elevation deermice during gestation, which can affect development and maternal physiology. However, several physiological adaptations allow them to survive at high elevations, including a greater capacity for carbohydrate and lipid oxidation than low-elevation mice. Mouse populations living at different elevations show allelic variation among gene duplicates that encode the α-chain subunits of adult hemoglobin. Modifications in the α and β globin genes may also indicate an increase in hemoglobin-oxygen affinity and oxygen transport in these high-elevation populations.

== Reproduction and life span ==
=== Procreation ===
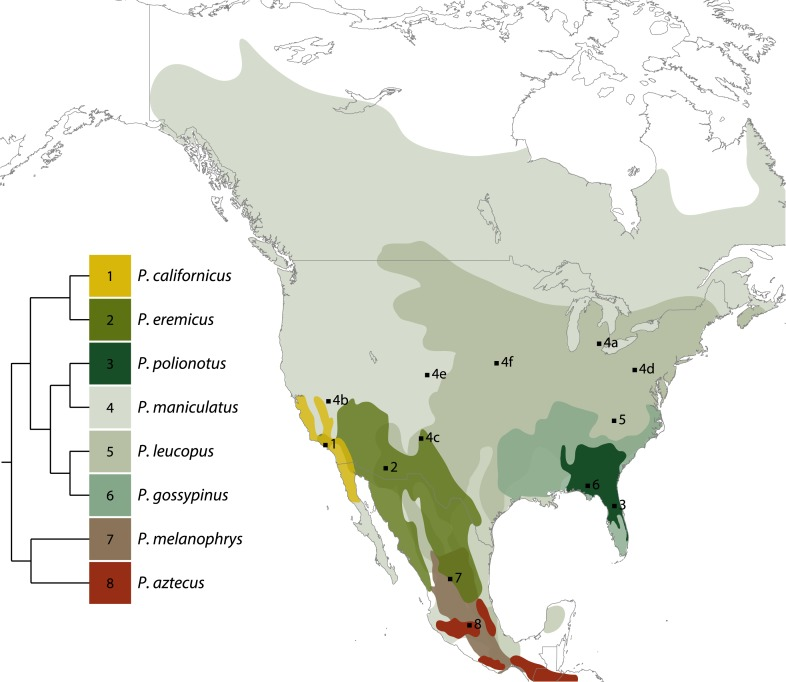
Deer mouse (Peromyscus) species and ranges in North America P. maniculatus

Eastern deer mice are polygynous, meaning one male will mate with multiple females. They exhibit behaviors associated with polygyny, as males have much larger territory than females, live with multiple females, and are known to commit infanticide if they catch young unattended. Though they usually live alone, during winter, the single male-multiple female cohort may live in a shared nest.

=== Breeding season ===
Eastern deer mice can reproduce throughout the year, though in most parts of their range, they breed from March to October. Their breeding tends to be determined more by food availability rather than by season. In Virginia, breeding peaks occur from April to June and from September to October.

=== Nesting ===
Female eastern deer mice construct nests using a variety of materials, including grasses, roots, mosses, wool, thistledown, and various artificial fibers. The males are allowed by the female to help nest the litter and keep them together and warm for survival.

In a study, less than half of both male and female eastern deer mice left their original home range to reproduce. This means that intrafamilial mating occurs and that the gene flow among this species as a whole is limited.

Recent laboratory studies have revealed that eastern deer mice can have OCD-like behaviors from altered gut microbiota. This phenomenon is typically shown in building abnormally large nests within 8 weeks of birth. Such behavior is considered a maladaptation, unnecessarily investing extra energy and effort in building larger nests in stable laboratory conditions.

=== Gestation, litter size and productivity ===
Deer mice reproduce profusely and are highest in numbers among their genus compared to other local mammals, with eastern deermice being among the most numerous. Peromyscus species' gestation periods range from 22 to 26 days. Typical litters are composed of three to five young; litter sizes range from one to nine young. Most female eastern deer mice have more than one litter per year. Three or four litters per year is probably typical; captive eastern deer mice have borne as many as 14 litters in one year. Males usually live with the family and help care for the young.

=== Development of young ===
Eastern deer mouse pups are altricial, i.e. born blind, naked, and helpless; development is rapid. Young deer mice have full coats by the end of the second week; their eyes open between 13 and 19 days and they are fully furred and independent in only a few weeks. Females have three pairs of teats. They lactate for 27 to 34 days after giving birth; most young are weaned at about 18 to 24 days. The young reach adult size at about 6 weeks and continue to gain weight slowly thereafter.

Age of first estrus averages about 48 days; the earliest recorded was 23 days. The youngest wild female to produce a litter was 55 days old; conception was estimated to have occurred when she was about 32 days old.

=== Dispersal ===
Eastern deer mouse pups usually disperse after weaning and before the birth of the next litter, when they are reaching sexual maturity. Occasionally, juveniles remain in the natal area, particularly when breeding space is limited. Most deer mouse species travel less than 152 m (499 ft) from the natal area to establish their own home range.

=== Longevity and mortality ===
In the laboratory, their maximum lifespan is 96 months, and mean life expectancy is 45.5 months for females and 47.5 for males. In many areas, eastern deer mice live less than 1 year. One captive male deer mouse lived 32 months, and a forest specimen was reported to have lived 8 years in captivity, and another mouse was fertile until almost 6 years of age.

== Habitat ==
P. maniculatus is found in all throughout eastern North America. The deer mouse nests alone for the most part, but during the winter, nests in groups of 10 or more. Deer mice, specifically the prairie form, are also abundant in the farmland of the Midwestern United States. Deer mice can be found active on top of snow or beneath logs during the winter seasons. In northern New England, deer mice are present in both coniferous and deciduous forests. Deer mice are often the only Peromyscus species in northern boreal forest. Subspecies differ in their use of plant communities and vegetation structures. The two main groups of deer mouse are the prairie deer mouse and the woodland or forest deer mouse group.

== Cover requirements ==
Deer mice are often active in open habitat; most subspecies do not develop hidden runways the way many voles (Microtus and Clethrionomys species) do. In open habitat within forests, deer mice have a tendency to visit the nearest timber. In central Ontario deer mice used downed wood for runways.

Deer mice nest in burrows dug in the ground or construct nests in raised areas such as brush piles, logs, rocks, stumps, under bark, and in hollows in trees. Nests are also constructed in various structures and artifacts, including old boards and abandoned vehicles. Nests have been found up to 24 m (79 ft) above the ground in Douglas-fir (Pseudotsuga menziesii) trees.

== Predators ==
Deer mice are important prey for snakes (Viperidae), owls (Strigidae), American minks (Neogale vison), American martens (Martes americana), and other mustelids, as well as skunks (Mephitis and Spilogale species), bobcats (Lynx rufus), domestic cats (Felis catus), coyotes (Canis latrans), and foxes (Vulpes vulpes and Urocyon cinereoargenteus). Deer mice are also parasitized by Cuterebra fontinella.

== Diet ==
Deer mice are omnivorous; their main dietary items usually include seeds, fruit, arthropods, leaves, and fungi; fungi have the least amount of intake. Throughout the year, the deer mouse changes its eating habits to reflect what is available. During winters, arthropods compose of one-fifth of its food. These include spiders, caterpillars, and heteropterans. During the spring, seeds become available to eat, along with insects, which are consumed in large quantities. Leaves are also found in the stomachs of deer mice in the spring. During summers, the mouse consumes seeds and fruit. During the fall, the deer mouse slowly changes its eating habits to resemble the winter's diet.
