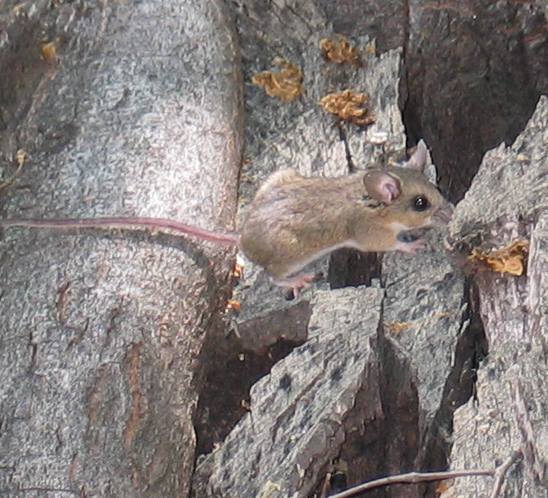

Conservation status
- Least Concern (IUCN 3.1)

- Secure (NatureServe)

Scientific classification
- Kingdom: Animalia
- Phylum: Chordata
- Class: Mammalia
- Order: Rodentia
- Family: Cricetidae
- Subfamily: Neotominae
- Genus: Peromyscus
- Species: P. boylii

Binomial name
- Peromyscus boylii (Baird, 1855)

Subspecies
- P. b. boylii P. b. glasselli P. b. rowleyi P. b. utahensis

= Brush mouse =

Species of rodent

The brush mouse (Peromyscus boylii) is a species of rodent in the family Cricetidae. It is a species of the genus Peromyscus, a closely related group of New World mice often called "deermice". It is found in mountainous areas of Mexico and the western United States at altitudes over 2,000 m (6,600 ft).

A brush mouse on Mt. Charleston, Nevada, during a survey.

== Description ==
The brush mouse is medium-sized, with small ears and a long tail. It has yellowish-brown fur on the body, with slate grey under parts. The tail has only sparse hair for most of its length, but with a distinct brush-like tuft of hair at the tip (although the common name is, perhaps, more likely to come from brushy environment in which it lives). It has a head-body length of 86 to 105 mm (3.4 to 4.1 in) with a tail 88 to 115 mm (3.5 to 4.5 in) long. It is very similar in appearance to a number of closely related species of mouse living in the same area, although it can be distinguished from them by such features as the length of its tail, the size of its ears, and the presence of the tuft on the end of the tail.

== Distribution and habitat ==
The brush mouse can be found from northern California to eastern Colorado and western Texas, and south to Baja California and southern Mexico. Fossils of brush mice up to 35,000 years old have been discovered, but none have been definitively identified from outside the current range of the species.

Vegetation in brush mouse habitats may vary from location to location, but brush mice are consistently captured in areas with medium to high densities of shrubs and tree cover under 16 ft (4.9 m) in height. In California, mature chaparral (cover ≥50%) appears to provide more suitable habitat for brush mice than young, open chaparral (cover <50%). Similarly, in Arizona, Duran captured brush mice most frequently in shrub live oak and birchleaf mountain-mahogany (Cercocarpus betuloides) understory habitats with 45% to 50% plant cover. Fewer brush mice were captured in habitats with less plant cover. Holbrook observed that after vegetation crowns were removed in a manzanita (Arctostaphylos spp.)-oak shrubland, brush mice avoided the newly opened space. In another study, brush mice were strongly restricted to habitats in which gaps between rocks or ceanothus (Ceanothus spp.) on the site were less than 4 ft (1.2 m).

In addition to shrub density, the height of cover appears to influence brush mouse distribution within a site. An average understory height of 5.0–6.5 feet (1.5–2.0 metres) was preferred by brush mice over lower understory cover. In another study, brush mouse presence was positively correlated with microhabitats of shrub cover up to 10 feet (3.0 m) tall, logs over 3 inches (7.6 cm) in diameter, and understory trees 10–33 feet (3.0–10.1 metres) in height, but negatively correlated with grass-forb microhabitats.

Brush mice are also commonly captured at locations with high proportions of rock cover and/or slash piles in habitats characterized by chaparral-mountain shrub, oak/shrub, oak-juniper-pinyon pine, juniper-pinyon pine, and oak-pine communities, as well as riparian habitats. The brush mouse in Texas has been found in all major habitats present (desert, grassland, riparian, and montane), although it is typically associated with rock outcrops within these habitats. Riparian sites with abundant brush mouse populations had high shrub cover, high frequency of debris piles with low grass, litter, and tree cover. In a Mexico study, a canyon was dominated by exposed rock, grasses, pines, hardwoods, and brush. In West Texas, brush mice favored fallen logs and brush piles. Modi discovered that brush mice were common in riparian zones dominated by pecan (Carya illinoensis), American sycamore (Platanus occidentalis) and live oak (Quercus virginiana), in an oak community with a partially open canopy and dense understory, and in a pine forest with little understory and scattered boulders. In New Mexico, brush mouse populations were significantly (P<0.05) higher on sites that were bulldozed or thinned (98 and 115 captures, respectively) than untreated or bulldozed and burned sites. Populations were lowest on sites that had not been treated (45 captures). Sites that had increased slash from bulldozing and burning had more brush mice (57 captures) than the untreated sites, but the difference was not significant (P>0.05). No influence of canopy cover on brush mice was observed by Severson et al.

Besides high tree, shrub, and rock densities, brush mice appear to prefer locations with low grass cover. At the same time, grasses are often present in the understory indicating that grasses do not exclude brush mice. Brush mice used grazed and ungrazed pastures and ceanothus plots, but they were concentrated around rocky outcrops and vegetation continuous with the rock outcrops. No brush mice were captured in the grasslands more than 20 ft (6.1 m) from rocks, shrubs, or trees. Litter depth also appears negatively correlated to brush mouse presence. For instance, brush mice in Arizona were captured in litter depths of only 0.9 inches (2.3 cm).

Brush mice also use fire-affected habitats. In one study, brush mice were captured in burned and unburned chaparral, as well as burned and unburned pine-oak forest. The highest number of captures were recorded in unburned forest, while the lowest captures occurred in the unburned chaparral. These results are somewhat inconsistent with other observations which show the brush mouse favoring dense chaparral habitat. Small mammal capture data in the study were collected from 14 months to three years after fire. The time frame of sampling after fire may influence the perceived response of the brush mouse to burned habitats.

Elevation, in addition to habitat characteristics, may play a role in habitat suitability in some areas. For instance, in the northern Sierra Nevada of California, brush mice were captured in brush habitats at 3,500–5,000 ft (1,100–1,500 m), but not at 6,500 ft (2,000 m). Aspect may influence the distribution of brush mice on a site, as well. For example, in New Mexico, 51% of all brush mice captured were taken on south-facing slopes, 24% on west-facing slopes, with 13% and 12% of mice captured on east- and north-facing slopes, respectively. The south-facing canyon slopes may provide more cover for brush mice due to higher numbers of shrubs.

Although brush mice are found on a variety of slopes, including flat mesas and gradual slopes, they seem to prefer locations with very steep slopes, such as hillsides, mountainsides, and canyons (including some slopes with >45% gradient) over more gradual slopes in the same areas. Findley reported that brush mice were captured on hillsides in an oak/sacahuista (Nolina spp.) community. In another study, brush mice were common in canyon bottoms, on hillsides, and in arroyos (water channels in arid regions) characterized by oak woodlands. Brush mice have also been captured along the sides of brush covered canyons and burned slopes of an oak/brush association.

=== Subspecies ===
Four subspecies of brush mouse are currently identified:

- P. b. boylii – northern California
- P. b. glasselli – San Pedro Nolasco Island
- P. b. rowleyi – remainder of range
- P. b. utahensis – central Utah

== Density and home range ==
Brush mouse population densities were 40–72 mice per hectare in coastal California. discovered Similarly, densities of brush mice in coastal California were 42–89 mice per hectare. Densities appear to be greatly influenced by weather. Densities were 17–20 per acre one year, but were reduced to six mice per acre following a severe winter. At another study site, brush mice increased from four individuals per acre to 12 per acre after a mild winter. Populations in a canyon in Mexico were estimated at a mean of 10.8 brush mice per acre or 6.0 males and 4.8 females per acre. The range was 9–14 brush mice per acre.

A study using radiotelemetry and trapping data in Arizona estimated mean home range size for male brush mice at 0.72–1.6 acres (0.29–0.65 hectares), and 0.32–0.79 acres (0.13–0.32 hectares) for females. In another study at the same location, home ranges for male brush mice ranged from means of 1.2–1.5 acres (0.49–0.61 ha) and for females, means of 0.64–1.2 acres (0.26–0.49 ha). Mean home range for male and female brush mice in Arizona, based on radiotelemetry, was 0.30 acres (0.12 ha).

== Cover requirements ==
No significant differences in habitat use between genders were observed in Arizona. Typical habitat in southern Arizona was characterized by 74% tree cover, 60% leaf cover, 21% shrub cover, and 16% rock cover. Additionally, 67% of all brush mice relocated by radiotelemetry in the study were located in a riparian zone with the other observations occurring in uplands and an intermittent stream channel. Brush mice used sites with significantly (P<0.05) more rock cover (19% to 22%) during winter and spring than at other times of the year. Also in spring, plots with the most brush mice also had significantly (P<0.05) more shrub cover (21% vs.14%) and succulents (9% vs. 2%) than random plots.

In a New Mexico study, 27% of brush mice captured were taken around rocky areas, 10% under Gambel oak (Q. gambelii), 9% under juniper, and 7% each around woodpiles and sacahuista. Less frequently, brush mice were taken under or around pinyon pine, gray oak (Q. grisea), Apache plume, rabbitbrush, mountain-mahogany, white fir (Abies concolor), Douglas-fir (Pseudotsuga menziesii), locust (Robinia spp.), prickly pear, cholla (Opuntia spp.), chokecherry (Prunus spp.), bricklebush (Brickellia spp.), and grape (Vitis spp.).

In southern California, brush mice were captured on leaf mold in an oak hardwood association of coast live oak, white alder (Alnus rhombifolia), whiteflower currant, and sumac (Rhus spp.). They were also trapped under logs and dense vegetation and on wet seepage slopes next to a creek. In coastal California, brush mice were captured primarily under coast live oak, false-willow (Baccharis douglasii), California buckeye, and California bay.

Fallen logs and rock outcrops provide nest sites for the brush mouse. They may also construct nests in tree hollows and burrows. Brush mice living in mine shafts or caves build nests similar to those of goldfinches. Davis noted that the brush mouse nest is a "globular structure" and is constructed primarily of dried grasses within natural cavities. Brush mouse nest sites in California were found on sites with a high density coast live oak (Q. agrifolia) overstory and an open understory with low vegetation and ground cover.

== Plant communities ==
=== California ===
In California, overstory associates include gray pine (Pinus sabiniana) and California buckeye (Aesculus californica). Understory and other herbaceous species include bulrushes (Scirpus spp.), fourwing saltbrush (Atriplex canescens), and rubber rabbitbrush (Chrysothamnus nauseosus). Whiteflower currant (Ribes indecorum), California bay (Umbellularia californica), black sage (Salvia mellifera), laurel sumac (Malosma laurina), and deerweed (Lotus scoparius) may also be present. Understories may also include exotic annual forbs and grasses such as mustard (Brassica spp.), oats (Avena spp.), and brome (Bromus spp.).

=== Arizona ===
In Arizona, overstories where brush mice are found are characterized by desert willow (Chilopsis linearis), Arizona sycamore (Platanus wrightii), and shrub live oak (Quercus turbinella). Shrub associates include evergreen sumac (Rhus virens), skunkbush sumac (Rhus trilobata), roundleaf snowberry (Symphoricarpos rotundifolius), New Mexico locust (Robinia neomexicana), common hoptree (Ptelea trifoliata), fendlerbush (Fendlera rupicola), Carruth's sagewort (Artemisia carruthii), catclaw acacia (Acacia greggii), broom snakeweed (Gutierrezia sarothrae), red barberry (Mahonia haematocarpa), netleaf hackberry (Celtis reticulata), and wait-a-minute (Mimosa aculeaticarpa var. biuncifera). Herbaceous and succulent species in brush mouse habitats include Wheeler sotol (Dasylirion wheeleri), sacahuista (Nolina microcarpa), Palmer agave (Agave palmeri), goldenrod (Solidago spp.), lupine (Lupinus spp.), prickly-pear (Opuntia spp.), and ocotillo (Fouquieria splendens). Grasses found in brush mouse habitat include Lehmann lovegrass (Eragrostis lehmanniana), bottlebrush squirreltail (Elymus elymoides), and other annual and perennial bunchgrasses.

=== New Mexico ===
New Mexico habitats are characterized by rabbitbrush (Chrysothamnus spp.), Apache plume (Fallugia paradoxa), fourwing saltbrush, common hoptree and crispleaf buckwheat (Eriogonum corymbosum) in addition to a pinyon-juniper-mountain-mahogany (Pinus-Juniperus-Cercocarpus spp.) overstory. Texas plant associates include Pinchot juniper (Juniperus pinchotii), algerita (Mahonia trifoliolata), clapweed (Ephedra antisyphilitica), featherplume (Dalea formosa), and prickly-pear (Opuntia spp.).

== Timing of major life events ==
Brush mice are nocturnal. Brush mice appear to limit activity during cooler months in the Sierra Nevada of California, although they are not known to hibernate or enter torpor. In southern areas, such as Arizona, Texas, and northern Mexico, brush mice are active year-round.

Brush mice reach sexual maturity at 12–19 weeks. However, female brush mice may reach sexual maturity in about five to 9 weeks. In Arizona, females born in late May or June were found pregnant during August of the same year. In West Texas, Arizona, southern Utah, and Mexico, breeding appears to occur nearly year-round. However, in northern California, breeding in brush mice peaked twice each year, once in late spring and again in late summer. This result may be related to food availability.

Female brush mice carry one to six embryos each, with three or four embryos being most common. Lactating females may become pregnant, although lactation may slow the development of embryos in Peromyscus species. The gestation period of the brush mouse is around 23 days. Females may have multiple litters per year. The time between litters is likely similar to other Peromyscus species, 25–31 days. Young are weaned at three to four weeks of age.

Brush mice have a promiscuous mating system. Four of seven litters in a California study were fathered by several males. Males and females did not share nests, and mating pairs did not remain together for long periods of time.

Few Peromyscus spp. mice live longer than six months in the wild, but individuals may live up to five years in captivity.

== Food habits ==
Brush mice are semiarboreal and can be found foraging in shrubs and trees for leaves and fruits. Females were captured more often than males foraging in canyon live oaks (Q. chrysolepis). The individuals with the longest tails appear to spend more time climbing than those with shorter tails.

Acorns are commonly eaten by brush mice wherever they are available. Arthropods and cutworms (Protorthodes rufula) are also eaten throughout the year. A variety of fruits and seeds from Douglas-fir, ponderosa pine (Pinus ponderosa), pinyon, California buckeye, manzanita (A. patula and A. viscida), silktassel (Garrya spp.), oneseed juniper (Juniperus monosperma), hackberries (Celtis spp.), New Mexico groundsel (Senecio neomexicanus var. neomexicanus), trailing fleabane (Erigeron flagellaris), annual sunflower (Helianthus annuus), broom snakeweed, common dandelion (Taraxacum officinale), western yarrow (Achillea millefolium), white sweetclover (Melilotus albus), threenerve goldenrod (Solidago velutina), prickly-pear, desert wheatgrass (Agropyron desertorum), Kentucky bluegrass (Poa pratensis), and blue grama (Bouteloua gracilis) are eaten throughout the year when available. Other plant parts, such as leaves, stems, flowers, pollen cones, and new sprouts are typically eaten in lower quantities than other foods. Fungi are typically consumed when other foods are scarce. Infrequently, stomach contents of brush mice contained pieces of mammals, birds, and fence lizards (Sceloporus spp.).

Brush mice have been observed caching pinyon pine seeds. This observation suggests the brush mouse may play a role in seed dispersal for some plant species.

== Predators ==
Predators of the brush mouse include birds of prey such as the northern goshawk (Accipiter gentilis) and spotted owl (Strix occidentalis). Potential mammalian predators may include the coyote (Canis latrans), common gray fox (Urocyon cinereoargenteus), red fox (Vulpes vulpes), swift fox (Vulpes velox), ringtail (Bassariscus astutus), Pacific marten (Martes caurina), fisher (Pekania pennanti), American ermine (Mustela richardsonii), long-tailed weasel (Neogale frenata), striped skunk (Mephitis mephitis), hooded skunk (Mephitis macroura), white-backed hog-nosed skunk (Conepatus leuconotus), northern raccoon (Procyon lotor), bobcat (Lynx rufus), and ocelot (Leopardus pardalis). Snakes also prey on brush mice.
