= List of neotomines =

Species in mammal subfamily Neotominae

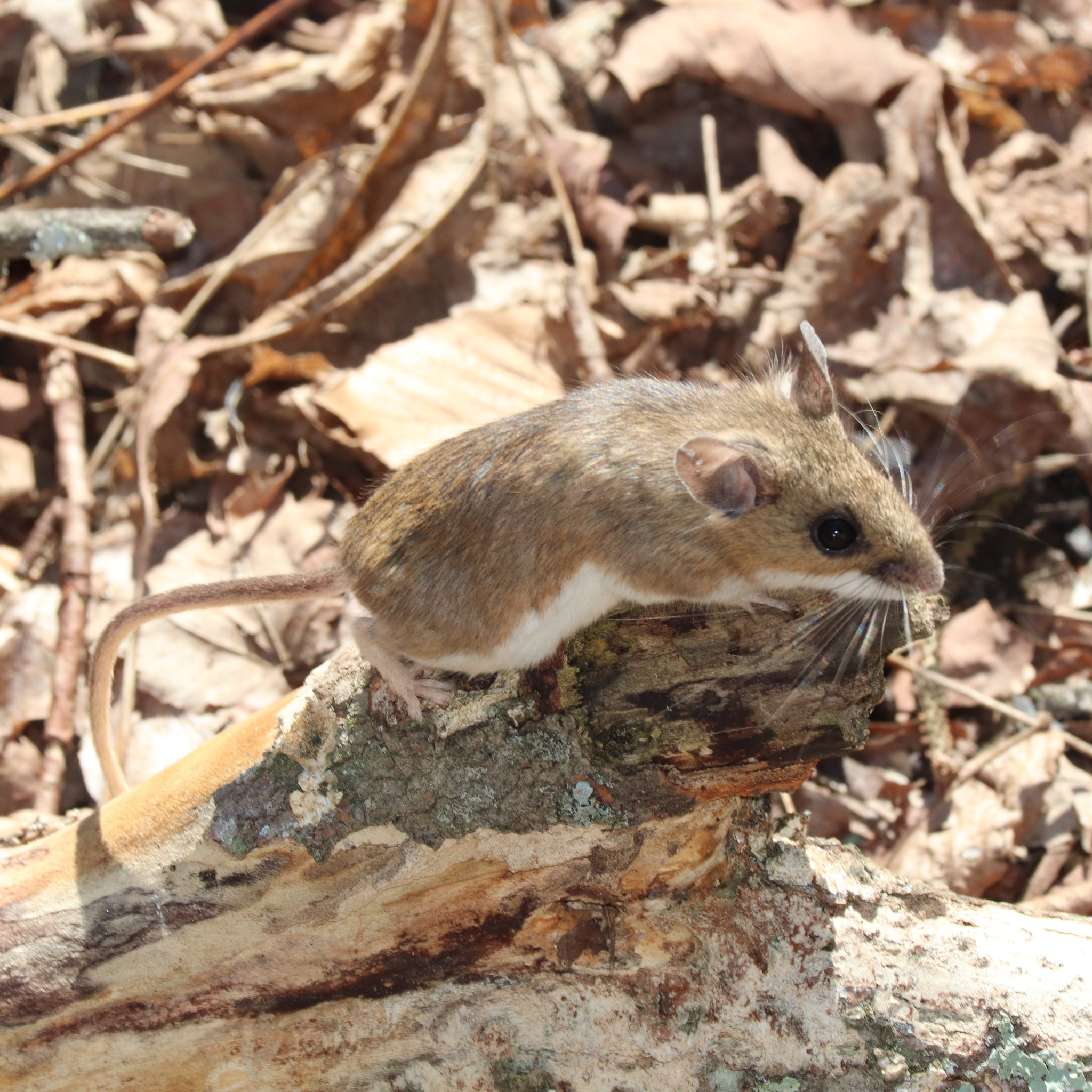
White-footed mouse (Peromyscus leucopus)

Neotominae is a subfamily of mammals in the rodent family Cricetidae, which in turn is part of the Myomorpha suborder in the order Rodentia. Members of this subfamily are called neotomines and include deer mice, pack rats, and grasshopper mice. They are found in North America, Central America, and northwestern South America, primarily in forests, shrublands, grasslands, and deserts, though some species can be found in rocky areas and wetlands. They range in size from the northern pygmy mouse, at 5 cm (2 in) plus a 3 cm (1.2 in) tail, to the bushy-tailed woodrat, at 25 cm (10 in) plus a 22 cm (9 in) tail. Neotomines generally eat seeds, nuts, roots, stems, leaves, and invertebrates. Almost no neotomines have population estimates, but 16 species are categorized as endangered, and 14 species are categorized as critically endangered, some with population sizes of less than 50. One species, Pemberton's deer mouse, was driven extinct in the 1900s.

The 123 extant species of Neotominae are divided into 16 genera, with almost half of the species, 56, in the Peromyscus genus. Several extinct prehistoric neotomine species have been discovered, though due to ongoing research and discoveries, the exact number and categorization are not fixed.

== Conventions ==
IUCN Red List categories
Conservation status
- EX: Extinct (1 species)
- EW: Extinct in the wild (0 species)
- CR: Critically endangered (14 species)
- EN: Endangered (16 species)
- VU: Vulnerable (7 species)
- NT: Near threatened (8 species)
- LC: Least concern (76 species)

Other categories
- DD: Data deficient (2 species)
- NE: Not evaluated (0 species)

The author citation for the species or genus is given after the scientific name; parentheses around the author citation indicate that this was not the original taxonomic placement. Conservation status codes listed follow the International Union for Conservation of Nature (IUCN) Red List of Threatened Species. Range maps are provided wherever possible; if a range map is not available, a description of the neotomine's range is provided. Ranges are based on the IUCN Red List for that species unless otherwise noted. All extinct species, subspecies, or genera listed alongside extant species went extinct after 1500 CE, and are indicated by a dagger symbol: "†".

== Classification ==
Neotominae is a subfamily of the rodent family Cricetidae consisting of 123 extant species in 16 genera. These genera range in size from 1 to 56 species, with the latter, Peromyscus, comprising nearly half of the species in the subfamily. Additionally, one species, Pemberton's deer mouse in Peromyscus, was driven extinct in the 1900s. This does not include hybrid species or extinct prehistoric species.

Subfamily Neotominae

- Genus Baiomys (New World pygmy mice): two species
- Genus Habromys (slender-tailed deer mice): six species
- Genus Hodomys (Allen's woodrat): one species
- Genus Isthmomys (isthmus rats): one species
- Genus Megadontomys (giant deer mice): three species
- Genus Nelsonia (diminutive woodrats): two species
- Genus Neotoma (pack rats): twenty species
- Genus Neotomodon (Mexican volcano mouse): one species
- Genus Ochrotomys (golden mouse): one species
- Genus Onychomys (grasshopper mice): three species
- Genus Osgoodomys (Michoacan deer mouse): one species
- Genus Peromyscus (deer mice): fifty-seven species (one extinct)
- Genus Podomys (Florida mouse): one species
- Genus Reithrodontomys (harvest mice): twenty-one species
- Genus Scotinomys (singing mice): two species
- Genus Xenomys (Magdalena rat): one species

- Neotominae
  - - Neotomini
      - Nelsonia
      - - - Hodomys
          - Xenomys
        - Neotoma
  - - - Ochrotomyini
        Ochrotomys
    - - Reithrodontomyini
        - - Onychomys
          - - Osgoodomys
            - - Habromys
              - Megadontomys
              - Neotomodon
              - Peromyscus
              - Podomys
        - - Isthmomys
          - Reithrodontomys
      - Baiomyini
        - Baiomys
        - Scotinomys

== Neotomines ==
The following classification is based on the taxonomy described by the reference work Mammal Species of the World (2005), with augmentation by generally accepted proposals made since using molecular phylogenetic analysis, as supported by both the IUCN and the American Society of Mammalogists.

Genus Baiomys – True, 1894 – two species
Common name	Scientific name and subspecies	Range	Size and ecology	IUCN status and estimated population
Mexican pygmy mouse	B. musculus (Merriam, 1892)	Southern Mexico and northern Central America	Size: 6–8 cm (2–3 in) long, plus 3–6 cm (1–2 in) tail Habitat: Shrubland, forest, and grassland Diet: Green vegetation, as well as seeds and insects	LC Unknown
Northern pygmy mouse	B. taylori (Thomas, 1887)	Mexico and southern United States	Size: 5–8 cm (2–3 in) long, plus 3–6 cm (1–2 in) tail Habitat: Grassland, forest, shrubland, and desert Diet: Cactus stems and fruit, seeds, and grass	LC Unknown

Genus Habromys – Hooper & Musser, 1964 – six species
Common name	Scientific name and subspecies	Range	Size and ecology	IUCN status and estimated population
Chinanteco deer mouse	H. chinanteco (Robertson & Musser, 1976)	Central Mexico	Size: 9–10 cm (4–4 in) long, plus 11–12 cm (4–5 in) tail Habitat: Forest Diet: Plant material and invertebrates	CR Unknown
Crested-tailed deer mouse	H. lophurus (Osgood, 1904)	Southern Mexico and northern Central America	Size: 9–12 cm (4–5 in) long, plus 9–12 cm (4–5 in) tail Habitat: Forest Diet: Plant material and invertebrates	NT Unknown
Delicate deer mouse	H. delicatulus Carleton, Sánchez, & Urbano Vidales, 2002	Central Mexico	Size: 7–9 cm (3–4 in) long, plus 7–9 cm (3–4 in) tail Habitat: Forest Diet: Plant material and invertebrates	EN Unknown
Ixtlán deer mouse	H. ixtlani Goodwin, 1964	Central Mexico	Size: 11–14 cm (4–6 in) long, plus 10–15 cm (4–6 in) tail Habitat: Forest Diet: Plant material and invertebrates	EN Unknown
Jico deer mouse	H. simulatus (Osgood, 1904)	Central Mexico	Size: 9–10 cm (4–4 in) long, plus 7–12 cm (3–5 in) tail Habitat: Forest Diet: Plant material and invertebrates	CR 50
Zempoaltepec deer mouse	H. lepturus (Merriam, 1899)	Southern Mexico	Size: 10–12 cm (4–5 in) long, plus 10–15 cm (4–6 in) tail Habitat: Forest Diet: Plant material and invertebrates	CR Unknown

Genus Hodomys – Merriam, 1894 – one species
Common name	Scientific name and subspecies	Range	Size and ecology	IUCN status and estimated population
Allen's woodrat	H. alleni (Merriam, 1892)	Southern Mexico	Size: 16–22 cm (6–9 in) long, plus 14–22 cm (6–9 in) tail Habitat: Shrubland Diet: Plant material and invertebrates	LC Unknown

Genus Isthmomys – Hooper & Musser, 1964 – two species
Common name	Scientific name and subspecies	Range	Size and ecology	IUCN status and estimated population
Mount Pirri isthmus rat	I. pirrensis (Goldman, 1912)	Panama and northwestern Colombia	Size: 15–18 cm (6–7 in) long, plus 18–20 cm (7–8 in) tail Habitat: Forest Diet: Plant material and invertebrates	LC Unknown
Yellow isthmus rat	I. flavidus (Bangs, 1902)	Panama	Size: 16–17 cm (6–7 in) long, plus 18–20 cm (7–8 in) tail Habitat: Forest Diet: Plant material and invertebrates	NT Unknown

Genus Megadontomys – Merriam, 1898 – three species
Common name	Scientific name and subspecies	Range	Size and ecology	IUCN status and estimated population
Nelson's giant deer mouse	M. nelsoni (Merriam, 1898)	Southern Mexico	Size: 13–15 cm (5–6 in) long, plus 17–18 cm (7–7 in) tail Habitat: Forest Diet: Seeds	EN Unknown
Oaxaca giant deer mouse	M. cryophilus (Musser, 1964)	Southern Mexico	Size: About 15 cm (6 in) long, plus 15–19 cm (6–7 in) tail Habitat: Forest Diet: Berries	EN Unknown
Thomas's giant deer mouse	M. thomasi (Merriam, 1898)	Southern Mexico	Size: 14–17 cm (6–7 in) long, plus 15–19 cm (6–7 in) tail Habitat: Forest Diet: Seeds	EN Unknown

Genus Nelsonia – Merriam, 1897 – two species
Common name	Scientific name and subspecies	Range	Size and ecology	IUCN status and estimated population
Diminutive woodrat	N. neotomodon Merriam, 1897	Central Mexico	Size: 11–13 cm (4–5 in) long, plus 10–12 cm (4–5 in) tail Habitat: Forest Diet: Conifer needles	LC Unknown
Goldman's diminutive woodrat	N. goldmani Merriam, 1903	Central Mexico	Size: 11–14 cm (4–6 in) long, plus 10–13 cm (4–5 in) tail Habitat: Forest Diet: Conifer needles	EN Unknown

Genus Neotoma – Say & Ord, 1825 – twenty species
Common name	Scientific name and subspecies	Range	Size and ecology	IUCN status and estimated population
Allegheny woodrat	N. magister Baird, 1857	Eastern United States	Size: 16–24 cm (6–9 in) long, plus 14–21 cm (6–8 in) tail Habitat: Caves, rocky areas, and forest Diet: Roots, stems, and leaves, as well as seeds and invertebrates	NT Unknown
Angel de la Guarda woodrat	N. insularis Townsend, 1912	Angel de la Guarda island in Western Mexico	Size: 17–18 cm (7–7 in) long, plus 11–17 cm (4–7 in) tail Habitat: Shrubland Diet: Roots, stems, and leaves, as well as seeds and invertebrates	DD Unknown
Arizona woodrat	N. devia Goldman, 1927	Southwestern United States and northwestern Mexico	Size: 14–18 cm (6–7 in) long, plus 10–15 cm (4–6 in) tail Habitat: Rocky areas and desert Diet: Roots, stems, and leaves, as well as seeds and invertebrates	LC Unknown
Big-eared woodrat	N. macrotis Thomas, 1893	Western United States and western Mexico	Size: 17–25 cm (7–10 in) long, plus 15–21 cm (6–8 in) tail Habitat: Desert, forest, and shrubland Diet: Roots, stems, and leaves, as well as seeds and invertebrates	LC Unknown
Bolaños woodrat	N. palatina Goldman, 1905	Central Mexico	Size: 18–22 cm (7–9 in) long, plus 14–18 cm (6–7 in) tail Habitat: Forest and rocky areas Diet: Roots, stems, and leaves, as well as seeds and invertebrates	VU Unknown
Bryant's woodrat	N. bryanti Merriam, 1887	Western Mexico and southwestern United States	Size: 16–21 cm (6–8 in) long, plus 12–19 cm (5–7 in) tail Habitat: Coastal marine, desert, and forest Diet: Roots, stems, and leaves, as well as seeds and invertebrates	LC Unknown
Bushy-tailed woodrat	N. cinerea (Ord, 1815)	Western United States and western Canada	Size: 17–25 cm (7–10 in) long, plus 12–22 cm (5–9 in) tail Habitat: Forest, caves, desert, rocky areas, and shrubland Diet: Roots, stems, and leaves, as well as seeds and invertebrates	LC Unknown
Desert woodrat	N. lepida Thomas, 1893	Western United States and northwestern Mexico	Size: 15–18 cm (6–7 in) long, plus 10–18 cm (4–7 in) tail Habitat: Desert and shrubland Diet: Roots, stems, and leaves, as well as seeds and invertebrates	LC Unknown
Dusky-footed woodrat	N. fuscipes Baird, 1858	Western United States	Size: 17–23 cm (7–9 in) long, plus 15–24 cm (6–9 in) tail Habitat: Shrubland and forest Diet: Roots, stems, and leaves, as well as seeds and invertebrates	LC Unknown
Eastern woodrat	N. floridana (Ord, 1818)	Central and eastern United States	Size: 18–24 cm (7–9 in) long, plus 12–20 cm (5–8 in) tail Habitat: Forest, grassland, shrubland, rocky areas, and inland wetlands Diet: Roots, stems, and leaves, as well as seeds and invertebrates	LC Unknown
Goldman's woodrat	N. goldmani Merriam, 1903	Central Mexico	Size: 14–16 cm (6–6 in) long, plus 11–14 cm (4–6 in) tail Habitat: Rocky areas and desert Diet: Roots, stems, and leaves, as well as seeds and invertebrates	LC Unknown
Mexican woodrat	N. mexicana Baird, 1855	South-central United States, Mexico, and Central America	Size: 15–20 cm (6–8 in) long, plus 13–22 cm (5–9 in) tail Habitat: Forest and rocky areas Diet: Roots, stems, and leaves, as well as seeds and invertebrates	LC Unknown
Nelson's woodrat	N. nelsoni Goldman, 1905	Central Mexico	Size: About 20 cm (8 in) long, plus about 15 cm (6 in) tail Habitat: Forest Diet: Roots, stems, and leaves, as well as seeds and invertebrates	CR Unknown
Nicaraguan woodrat	N. chrysomelas Allen, 1908	Honduras and Nicaragua	Size: 18–22 cm (7–9 in) long, plus 15–19 cm (6–7 in) tail Habitat: Forest and rocky areas Diet: Roots, stems, and leaves, as well as seeds and invertebrates	LC Unknown
Sonoran woodrat	N. phenax (Merriam, 1903)	Western Mexico	Size: 18–21 cm (7–8 in) long, plus 14–22 cm (6–9 in) tail Habitat: Forest and shrubland Diet: Roots, stems, and leaves, as well as seeds and invertebrates	LC Unknown
Southern Plains woodrat	N. micropus Baird, 1855	South-central United States and northern Mexico	Size: 18–24 cm (7–9 in) long, plus 13–18 cm (5–7 in) tail Habitat: Shrubland Diet: Roots, stems, and leaves, as well as seeds and invertebrates	LC Unknown
Stephen's woodrat	N. stephensi Goldman, 1905	Southwestern United States	Size: 15–17 cm (6–7 in) long, plus 13–15 cm (5–6 in) tail Habitat: Forest and rocky areas Diet: Roots, stems, and leaves, as well as seeds and invertebrates	LC Unknown
Tamaulipan woodrat	N. angustapalata Baker, 1951	Central Mexico	Size: 18–22 cm (7–9 in) long, plus 19–20 cm (7–8 in) tail Habitat: Forest Diet: Roots, stems, and leaves, as well as seeds and invertebrates	NT Unknown
White-throated woodrat	N. albigula Hartley, 1894	Southwestern United States and northwestern Mexico	Size: 20–21 cm (8–8 in) long, plus 7–19 cm (3–7 in) tail Habitat: Desert, shrubland, rocky areas, and forest Diet: Roots, stems, and leaves, as well as seeds and invertebrates	LC Unknown
White-toothed woodrat	N. leucodon Merriam, 1894	South-central United States and Mexico	Size: 20–21 cm (8–8 in) long, plus 7–19 cm (3–7 in) tail Habitat: Rocky areas, desert, and shrubland Diet: Roots, stems, and leaves, as well as seeds and invertebrates	LC Unknown

Genus Neotomodon – Merriam, 1898 – one species
Common name	Scientific name and subspecies	Range	Size and ecology	IUCN status and estimated population
Mexican volcano mouse	N. alstoni Merriam, 1898	Central Mexico	Size: 9–13 cm (4–5 in) long, plus 7–11 cm (3–4 in) tail Habitat: Forest Diet: Plant material and invertebrates	LC Unknown

Genus Ochrotomys – Osgood, 1909 – one species
Common name	Scientific name and subspecies	Range	Size and ecology	IUCN status and estimated population
Golden mouse	O. nuttalli (Harlan, 1832)	Eastern United States	Size: 5–12 cm (2–5 in) long, plus 5–10 cm (2–4 in) tail Habitat: Shrubland and forest Diet: Seeds	LC Unknown

Genus Onychomys – Baird, 1857 – three species
Common name	Scientific name and subspecies	Range	Size and ecology	IUCN status and estimated population
Mearns's grasshopper mouse	O. arenicola Mearns, 1896	South-central United States and Mexico	Size: 8–11 cm (3–4 in) long, plus 4–6 cm (2–2 in) tail Habitat: Grassland and desert Diet: Insects, scorpions, and small vertebrates, as well as plant material	LC Unknown
Northern grasshopper mouse	O. leucogaster (Wied-Neuwied, 1841)	South-central Canada, United States, and northern Mexico	Size: 9–13 cm (4–5 in) long, plus 2–7 cm (1–3 in) tail Habitat: Desert, grassland, and shrubland Diet: Insects, scorpions, and small vertebrates, as well as plant material	LC Unknown
Southern grasshopper mouse	O. torridus (Coues, 1874)	Southwestern United States and northwestern Mexico	Size: 8–11 cm (3–4 in) long, plus 3–7 cm (1–3 in) tail Habitat: Desert and shrubland Diet: Insects, scorpions, and small vertebrates, as well as plant material	LC Unknown

Genus Osgoodomys – Hooper & Musser, 1964 – one species
Common name	Scientific name and subspecies	Range	Size and ecology	IUCN status and estimated population
Michoacan deer mouse	O. banderanus (Allen, 1897)	Southwestern Mexico	Size: 10–15 cm (4–6 in) long, plus 9–13 cm (4–5 in) tail Habitat: Forest Diet: Plant material and invertebrates	LC Unknown

Genus Peromyscus – Gloger, 1841 – 57 species
Common name	Scientific name and subspecies	Range	Size and ecology	IUCN status and estimated population
Angel Island mouse	P. guardia Townsend, 1912	Ángel de la Guarda island in western Mexico	Size: 9–10 cm (4–4 in) long, plus 9–13 cm (4–5 in) tail Habitat: Shrubland Diet: Seeds, nuts, berries, fruit, insects, other invertebrates, and carrion	CR 0–50
Aztec mouse	P. aztecus (Saussure, 1860)	Mexico and northern Central America	Size: 10–12 cm (4–5 in) long, plus 10–13 cm (4–5 in) tail Habitat: Forest Diet: Seeds, nuts, berries, fruit, insects, other invertebrates, and carrion	LC Unknown
Big deer mouse	P. grandis Goodwin, 1932	Guatemala	Size: 13–14 cm (5–6 in) long, plus 12–16 cm (5–6 in) tail Habitat: Forest Diet: Seeds, nuts, berries, fruit, insects, other invertebrates, and carrion	NT Unknown
Black-eared mouse	P. melanotis Allen & Chapman, 1897	Southwestern United States and Mexico	Size: 9–11 cm (4–4 in) long, plus 4–8 cm (2–3 in) tail Habitat: Forest, grassland, and rocky areas Diet: Seeds, nuts, berries, fruit, insects, other invertebrates, and carrion	LC Unknown
Black-tailed mouse	P. melanurus Osgood, 1909	Southern Mexico	Size: 11–14 cm (4–6 in) long, plus 12–15 cm (5–6 in) tail Habitat: Forest Diet: Seeds, nuts, berries, fruit, insects, other invertebrates, and carrion	EN Unknown
Black-wristed deer mouse	P. melanocarpus Osgood, 1904	Southern Mexico	Size: 10–13 cm (4–5 in) long, plus 10–14 cm (4–6 in) tail Habitat: Forest Diet: Seeds, nuts, berries, fruit, insects, other invertebrates, and carrion	EN Unknown
Blackish deer mouse	P. furvus Allen & Chapman, 1897	Central Mexico	Size: 11–14 cm (4–6 in) long, plus 11–17 cm (4–7 in) tail Habitat: Forest Diet: Seeds, nuts, berries, fruit, insects, other invertebrates, and carrion	NT Unknown
Brown deer mouse	P. megalops Merriam, 1898	Southern Mexico	Size: 11–15 cm (4–6 in) long, plus 11–16 cm (4–6 in) tail Habitat: Forest Diet: Seeds, nuts, berries, fruit, insects, other invertebrates, and carrion	LC Unknown
Brush mouse	P. boylii (Baird, 1855)	Northern Mexico and western United States	Size: 8–10 cm (3–4 in) long, plus 8–12 cm (3–5 in) tail Habitat: Forest, desert, shrubland, and rocky areas Diet: Seeds, nuts, berries, fruit, insects, other invertebrates, and carrion	LC Unknown
Burt's deer mouse	P. caniceps Burt, 1932	Montserrat island in western Mexico	Size: 8–10 cm (3–4 in) long, plus 10–13 cm (4–5 in) tail Habitat: Desert Diet: Seeds, nuts, berries, fruit, insects, other invertebrates, and carrion	CR Unknown
Cactus mouse	P. eremicus (Baird, 1858)	Northern Mexico and southwestern United States	Size: 7–10 cm (3–4 in) long, plus 8–12 cm (3–5 in) tail Habitat: Shrubland and desert Diet: Seeds, nuts, berries, fruit, insects, other invertebrates, and carrion	LC Unknown
California deermouse	P. californicus (Gambel, 1848)	Northwestern Mexico and southwestern United States	Size: 10–13 cm (4–5 in) long, plus 11–16 cm (4–6 in) tail Habitat: Shrubland and forest Diet: Seeds, nuts, berries, fruit, insects, other invertebrates, and carrion	LC Unknown
Canyon mouse	P. crinitus (Merriam, 1891)	Northwestern Mexico and western United States	Size: 7–9 cm (3–4 in) long, plus 8–12 cm (3–5 in) tail Habitat: Grassland, rocky areas, shrubland, and forest Diet: Seeds, nuts, berries, fruit, insects, other invertebrates, and carrion	LC Unknown
Chiapan deer mouse	P. zarhynchus Merriam, 1898	Southeastern Mexico	Size: 14–15 cm (6–6 in) long, plus 15–18 cm (6–7 in) tail Habitat: Forest Diet: Seeds, nuts, berries, fruit, insects, other invertebrates, and carrion	VU Unknown
Chihuahuan mouse	P. polius Osgood, 1904	Northern Mexico	Size: 9–12 cm (4–5 in) long, plus 12–14 cm (5–6 in) tail Habitat: Forest, shrubland, and grassland Diet: Seeds, nuts, berries, fruit, insects, other invertebrates, and carrion	VU Unknown
Cotton mouse	P. gossypinus (Le Conte, 1850)	Southeastern United States (in blue)	Size: 7–12 cm (3–5 in) long, plus 5–10 cm (2–4 in) tail Habitat: Intertidal marine, grassland, forest, inland wetlands, caves, and shrubland Diet: Seeds, nuts, berries, fruit, insects, other invertebrates, and carrion	LC Unknown
Dickey's deer mouse	P. dickeyi Burt, 1932	Tortuga island in western Mexico	Size: 9–11 cm (4–4 in) long, plus 9–10 cm (4–4 in) tail Habitat: Rocky areas and shrubland Diet: Seeds, nuts, berries, fruit, insects, other invertebrates, and carrion	VU Unknown
Eastern deer mouse	P. maniculatus (Wagner, 1845)	Canada, United States, and Mexico (in gray)	Size: 7–10 cm (3–4 in) long, plus 4–13 cm (2–5 in) tail Habitat: Desert, rocky areas, grassland, forest, shrubland, and inland wetlands Diet: Seeds, nuts, berries, fruit, insects, other invertebrates, and carrion	LC Unknown
El Carrizo deer mouse	P. ochraventer Gloger, 1841	Central Mexico	Size: 9–13 cm (4–5 in) long, plus 10–13 cm (4–5 in) tail Habitat: Forest Diet: Seeds, fruit, insects, and fungi	VU Unknown
Eva's desert mouse	P. eva Thomas, 1898	Western Mexico	Size: 8–9 cm (3–4 in) long, plus 10–13 cm (4–5 in) tail Habitat: Shrubland and rocky areas Diet: Seeds, nuts, berries, fruit, insects, other invertebrates, and carrion	LC Unknown
False canyon mouse	P. pseudocrinitus Burt, 1932	Coronados island in western Mexico	Size: 7–10 cm (3–4 in) long, plus 9–12 cm (4–5 in) tail Habitat: Coastal marine, shrubland, and rocky areas Diet: Seeds, nuts, berries, fruit, insects, other invertebrates, and carrion	CR Unknown
Gleaning mouse	P. spicilegus Allen, 1897	Western Mexico	Size: About 10 cm (4 in) long, plus about 10 cm (4 in) tail Habitat: Forest Diet: Seeds, nuts, berries, fruit, insects, other invertebrates, and carrion	LC Unknown
Guatemalan deer mouse	P. guatemalensis Merriam, 1898	Southern Mexico and Guatemala	Size: 13–14 cm (5–6 in) long, plus 12–16 cm (5–6 in) tail Habitat: Forest Diet: Seeds, nuts, berries, fruit, insects, other invertebrates, and carrion	LC Unknown
Hooper's mouse	P. hooperi Lee & Schmidly, 1977	Northern Mexico	Size: 8–9 cm (3–4 in) long, plus 9–14 cm (4–6 in) tail Habitat: Grassland Diet: Seeds, nuts, insects, and other invertebrates	LC Unknown
La Palma deermouse	P. sagax (Elliot, 1903)	Central Mexico	Size: 9–11 cm (4–4 in) long, plus 9–11 cm (4–4 in) tail Habitat: Shrubland and forest Diet: Seeds, nuts, berries, fruit, insects, other invertebrates, and carrion	EN Unknown
Maya mouse	P. mayensis Carleton & Huckaby, 1975	Guatemala	Size: 10–13 cm (4–5 in) long, plus 10–12 cm (4–5 in) tail Habitat: Forest Diet: Seeds, nuts, berries, fruit, insects, other invertebrates, and carrion	CR Unknown
Mesquite mouse	P. merriami Mearns, 1896	Western Mexico and southwestern United States	Size: 8–10 cm (3–4 in) long, plus 9–13 cm (4–5 in) tail Habitat: Shrubland Diet: Seeds, nuts, berries, fruit, insects, other invertebrates, and carrion	LC Unknown
Mexican deer mouse	P. mexicanus (Saussure, 1860)	Southern Mexico and Central America	Size: 10–14 cm (4–6 in) long, plus 10–14 cm (4–6 in) tail Habitat: Forest, shrubland, and rocky areas Diet: Seeds, nuts, berries, fruit, insects, other invertebrates, and carrion	LC Unknown
Naked-eared deer mouse	P. gymnotis Thomas, 1894	Southern Mexico and Central America	Size: 11–14 cm (4–6 in) long, plus 9–11 cm (4–4 in) tail Habitat: Forest Diet: Seeds, nuts, berries, fruit, insects, other invertebrates, and carrion	LC Unknown
Nayarit mouse	P. simulus Osgood, 1904	Western Mexico	Size: About 10 cm (4 in) long, plus 9–11 cm (4–4 in) tail Habitat: Forest Diet: Seeds, nuts, berries, fruit, insects, other invertebrates, and carrion	VU Unknown
Nimble-footed mouse	P. levipes Merriam, 1898	Central Mexico	Size: 8–11 cm (3–4 in) long, plus 9–12 cm (4–5 in) tail Habitat: Forest, shrubland, and rocky areas Diet: Grain, fruit, and green vegetation, as well as worms, insects, molluscs, and small vertebrates	LC Unknown
Northern Baja deer mouse	P. fraterculus (Miller, 1892)	Western Mexico and southwestern United States	Size: 7–10 cm (3–4 in) long, plus 9–12 cm (4–5 in) tail Habitat: Desert, shrubland, and rocky areas Diet: Seeds, nuts, berries, fruit, insects, other invertebrates, and carrion	LC Unknown
Northern rock mouse	P. nasutus (Allen, 1891)	South-central United States and northern Mexico	Size: 9–11 cm (4–4 in) long, plus 12–14 cm (5–6 in) tail Habitat: Rocky areas and forest Diet: Seeds, nuts, berries, fruit, insects, other invertebrates, and carrion	LC Unknown
Northwestern deer mouse	P. keeni (Rhoads, 1894)	Western Canada and northwestern United States	Size: 7–14 cm (3–6 in) long, plus 7–13 cm (3–5 in) tail Habitat: Forest, grassland, shrubland, and intertidal marine Diet: Seeds, nuts, berries, fruit, insects, other invertebrates, and carrion	LC Unknown
Oldfield mouse	P. polionotus (Wagner, 1843)	Southeastern United States (in dark green)	Size: 8–10 cm (3–4 in) long, plus 4–6 cm (2–2 in) tail Habitat: Shrubland, grassland, coastal marine, and intertidal marine Diet: Seeds, nuts, berries, fruit, insects, other invertebrates, and carrion	LC Unknown
Orizaba deer mouse	P. beatae (Thomas, 1903)	Southern Mexico and northern Central America	Size: 8–12 cm (3–5 in) long, plus 9–14 cm (4–6 in) tail Habitat: Forest Diet: Seeds, nuts, berries, fruit, insects, other invertebrates, and carrion	LC Unknown
Osgood's mouse	P. gratus Merriam, 1898	Mexico and southwestern United States	Size: 9–11 cm (4–4 in) long, plus 7–13 cm (3–5 in) tail Habitat: Shrubland, forest, grassland, and rocky areas Diet: Seeds, nuts, berries, fruit, insects, other invertebrates, and carrion	LC Unknown
Pemberton's deer mouse †	P. pembertoni Burt, 1932	San Pedro Nolasco island in western Mexico	Size: Unknown Habitat: Grassland Diet: Seeds, nuts, berries, fruit, insects, other invertebrates, and carrion	EX 0
Schmidly's deermouse	P. schmidlyi Bradley, Carroll, Haynie, Martínez, Hamilton, & Kilpatrick, 2004	Western Mexico	Size: 9–12 cm (4–5 in) long, plus 8–11 cm (3–4 in) tail Habitat: Forest Diet: Seeds, nuts, berries, fruit, insects, other invertebrates, and carrion	LC Unknown
Perote mouse	P. bullatus Osgood, 1904	Central Mexico	Size: 8–11 cm (3–4 in) long, plus 8–12 cm (3–5 in) tail Habitat: Forest, shrubland, and grassland Diet: Seeds, nuts, berries, fruit, insects, other invertebrates, and carrion	CR Unknown
Pinyon mouse	P. truei (Shufedlt, 1885)	Western United States and southwestern Mexico	Size: 9–11 cm (4–4 in) long, plus 10–13 cm (4–5 in) tail Habitat: Desert, shrubland, forest, and rocky areas Diet: Seeds, nuts, berries, fruit, insects, other invertebrates, and carrion	LC Unknown
Plateau mouse	P. melanophrys (Coues, 1874)	Mexico (in brown)	Size: 7–12 cm (3–5 in) long, plus 11–18 cm (4–7 in) tail Habitat: Desert and rocky areas Diet: Seeds, nuts, berries, fruit, insects, other invertebrates, and carrion	LC Unknown
Puebla deer mouse	P. mekisturus Merriam, 1898	Southern Mexico	Size: 8–10 cm (3–4 in) long, plus 13–16 cm (5–6 in) tail Habitat: Forest Diet: Seeds, nuts, berries, fruit, insects, other invertebrates, and carrion	CR 0–50
San Esteban Island mouse	P. stephani Townsend, 1912	San Esteban island in Western Mexico	Size: 8–10 cm (3–4 in) long, plus 10–13 cm (4–5 in) tail Habitat: Desert Diet: Seeds, nuts, berries, fruit, insects, other invertebrates, and carrion	CR Unknown
San Lorenzo mouse	P. interparietalis Burt, 1932	Western Mexico	Size: 7–10 cm (3–4 in) long, plus 8–12 cm (3–5 in) tail Habitat: Desert Diet: Seeds, sprouts, flowers, fruit, and insects	CR Unknown
Santa Cruz mouse	P. sejugis Burt, 1932	Western Mexico	Size: 9–11 cm (4–4 in) long, plus 6–10 cm (2–4 in) tail Habitat: Shrubland, rocky areas, and desert Diet: Seeds, nuts, berries, fruit, insects, other invertebrates, and carrion	EN Unknown
Slevin's mouse	P. slevini Mailliard, 1924	Santa Catalina island in western Mexico	Size: 10–12 cm (4–5 in) long, plus 9–11 cm (4–4 in) tail Habitat: Shrubland and rocky areas Diet: Seeds, nuts, berries, fruit, insects, other invertebrates, and carrion	CR Unknown
Stirton's deer mouse	P. stirtoni Dickey, 1928	Central America	Size: 9–11 cm (4–4 in) long, plus 8–11 cm (3–4 in) tail Habitat: Rocky areas and forest Diet: Seeds, nuts, berries, fruit, insects, other invertebrates, and carrion	LC Unknown
Tawny deer mouse	P. perfulvus Osgood, 1945	Southwestern Mexico	Size: 9–13 cm (4–5 in) long, plus 12–14 cm (5–6 in) tail Habitat: Forest Diet: Seeds, nuts, berries, fruit, insects, other invertebrates, and carrion	LC Unknown
Texas mouse	P. attwateri Allen, 1895	South-central United States	Size: 9–11 cm (4–4 in) long, plus 9–12 cm (4–5 in) tail Habitat: Forest and rocky areas Diet: Berries, acorns, seeds, plant material, and insects	LC Unknown
Transvolcanic deer mouse	P. hylocetes Merriam, 1898	Central Mexico	Size: 10–13 cm (4–5 in) long, plus 10–12 cm (4–5 in) tail Habitat: Forest Diet: Seeds, nuts, berries, fruit, insects, other invertebrates, and carrion	LC Unknown
Tres Marías Island mouse	P. madrensis Merriam, 1898	Mary islands in western Mexico	Size: 10–12 cm (4–5 in) long, plus 9–13 cm (4–5 in) tail Habitat: Forest Diet: Seeds, nuts, berries, fruit, insects, other invertebrates, and carrion	EN Unknown
White-ankled mouse	P. pectoralis Osgood, 1904	Mexico and south-central United States	Size: 9–10 cm (4–4 in) long, plus 8–13 cm (3–5 in) tail Habitat: Desert, forest, grassland, rocky areas, and shrubland Diet: Seeds and insects	LC Unknown
White-footed mouse	P. leucopus (Rafinesque, 1818)	Southern Canada, United States, and Mexico	Size: 8–11 cm (3–4 in) long, plus 4–10 cm (2–4 in) tail Habitat: Forest, desert, grassland, and shrubland Diet: Seeds, nuts, berries, fruit, insects, other invertebrates, and carrion	LC Unknown
Winkelmann's mouse	P. winkelmanni Carleton, 1977	Southwestern Mexico	Size: 11–13 cm (4–5 in) long, plus 11–14 cm (4–6 in) tail Habitat: Forest Diet: Seeds, nuts, berries, fruit, insects, other invertebrates, and carrion	EN Unknown
Yucatan deer mouse	P. yucatanicus Allen & Chapman, 1897	Eastern Mexico and northern Guatemala	Size: 9–11 cm (4–4 in) long, plus 8–12 cm (3–5 in) tail Habitat: Forest Diet: Seeds, nuts, berries, fruit, insects, other invertebrates, and carrion	LC Unknown
Zacatecan deer mouse	P. difficilis (Allen, 1891)	Mexico	Size: 10–12 cm (4–5 in) long, plus 11–14 cm (4–6 in) tail Habitat: Desert, grassland, and forest Diet: Seeds, nuts, berries, fruit, insects, other invertebrates, and carrion	LC Unknown

Genus Podomys – Osgood, 1909 – one species
Common name	Scientific name and subspecies	Range	Size and ecology	IUCN status and estimated population
Florida mouse	P. floridanus (Chapman, 1889)	Southeastern United States	Size: 9–12 cm (4–5 in) long, plus 8–11 cm (3–4 in) tail Habitat: Savanna, forest, grassland, and shrubland Diet: Seeds, nuts, fungi, vegetation, insects, and other invertebrates	NT Unknown

Genus Reithrodontomys – Giglioli, 1873 – 21 species
Common name	Scientific name and subspecies	Range	Size and ecology	IUCN status and estimated population
Chiriqui harvest mouse	R. creper Bangs, 1902	Costa Rica and Panama	Size: 8–10 cm (3–4 in) long, plus 11–15 cm (4–6 in) tail Habitat: Forest Diet: Seeds and shoots, as well as insects	LC Unknown
Cozumel harvest mouse	R. spectabilis Jones & Lawler, 1965	Cozumel island in eastern Mexico	Size: 8–9 cm (3–4 in) long, plus 12–14 cm (5–6 in) tail Habitat: Forest Diet: Seeds and shoots, as well as insects	CR 150
Darien harvest mouse	R. darienensis Pearson, 1939	Panama	Size: 6–7 cm (2–3 in) long, plus 10–12 cm (4–5 in) tail Habitat: Forest Diet: Seeds and shoots, as well as insects	LC Unknown
Eastern harvest mouse	R. humulis (Audubon & Bachman, 1941)	Southeastern United States	Size: 6–7 cm (2–3 in) long, plus 4–6 cm (2–2 in) tail Habitat: Grassland and inland wetlands Diet: Seeds and shoots, as well as insects	LC Unknown
Fulvous harvest mouse	R. fulvescens Allen, 1894	Southern United States, Mexico, and northern Central America	Size: 6–9 cm (2–4 in) long, plus 7–12 cm (3–5 in) tail Habitat: Shrubland and grassland Diet: Seeds and shoots, as well as insects	LC Unknown
Hairy harvest mouse	R. hirsutus Merriam, 1901	Southwestern Mexico	Size: 7–9 cm (3–4 in) long, plus 10–12 cm (4–5 in) tail Habitat: Desert Diet: Seeds and shoots, as well as insects	VU Unknown
Mexican harvest mouse	R. mexicanus (Saussure, 1860)	Southern Mexico, Central America, and northwestern South America	Size: 6–8 cm (2–3 in) long, plus 9–12 cm (4–5 in) tail Habitat: Forest and shrubland Diet: Seeds and shoots, as well as insects	LC Unknown
Narrow-nosed harvest mouse	R. tenuirostris Merriam, 1901	Southeastern Mexico and Guatemala	Size: 8–13 cm (3–5 in) long, plus 12–13 cm (5–5 in) tail Habitat: Forest Diet: Seeds and shoots, as well as insects	EN Unknown
Nicaraguan harvest mouse	R. paradoxus Jones & Genoways, 1970	Nicaragua and Costa Rica	Size: 7–8 cm (3–3 in) long, plus 9–11 cm (4–4 in) tail Habitat: Forest Diet: Seeds and shoots, as well as insects	DD Unknown
Plains harvest mouse	R. montanus (Baird, 1855)	Central United States and northern Mexico	Size: 5–7 cm (2–3 in) long, plus 5–7 cm (2–3 in) tail Habitat: Grassland Diet: Seeds and shoots, as well as insects	LC Unknown
Rodriguez's harvest mouse	R. rodriguezi Goodwin, 1943	Costa Rica	Size: 7–9 cm (3–4 in) long, plus 11–13 cm (4–5 in) tail Habitat: Forest Diet: Seeds and shoots, as well as insects	LC Unknown
Salt marsh harvest mouse	R. raviventris J. S. Dixon, 1908	Western United States	Size: 6–8 cm (2–3 in) long, plus 5–10 cm (2–4 in) tail Habitat: Inland wetlands and intertidal marine Diet: Seeds and shoots, as well as insects	EN Unknown
Short-nosed harvest mouse	R. brevirostris Goodwin, 1943	Nicaragua and Costa Rica	Size: 6–7 cm (2–3 in) long, plus 9–12 cm (4–5 in) tail Habitat: Forest Diet: Seeds and shoots, as well as insects	LC Unknown
Slender harvest mouse	R. gracilis Allen & Chapman, 1897	Southern Mexico and northern Central America	Size: 7–8 cm (3–3 in) long, plus 8–11 cm (3–4 in) tail Habitat: Forest and shrubland Diet: Seeds and shoots, as well as insects	LC Unknown
Small harvest mouse	R. musseri Gardner & Carleton, 2009	Costa Rica	Size: About 6 cm (2 in) long, plus about 10 cm (4 in) tail Habitat: Forest Diet: Seeds and shoots, as well as insects	NT Unknown
Small-toothed harvest mouse	R. microdon Merriam, 1901	Southern Mexico and Guatemala	Size: 6–7 cm (2–3 in) long, plus 10–12 cm (4–5 in) tail Habitat: Forest Diet: Seeds and shoots, as well as insects	LC Unknown
Sonoran harvest mouse	R. burti Benson, 1939	Northwestern Mexico	Size: 6–7 cm (2–3 in) long, plus 5–7 cm (2–3 in) tail Habitat: Shrubland Diet: Seeds and shoots, as well as insects	EN Unknown
Sumichrast's harvest mouse	R. sumichrasti (Saussure, 1861)	Southern Mexico and Central America	Size: 7–9 cm (3–4 in) long, plus 8–12 cm (3–5 in) tail Habitat: Forest Diet: Seeds and shoots, as well as insects	LC Unknown
Volcano harvest mouse	R. chrysopsis Merriam, 1900	Central Mexico	Size: 7–9 cm (3–4 in) long, plus 9–12 cm (4–5 in) tail Habitat: Forest Diet: Seeds and shoots, as well as insects	LC Unknown
Western harvest mouse	R. megalotis (Baird, 1857)	Southern Canada, United States, and Mexico	Size: 6–8 cm (2–3 in) long, plus 5–10 cm (2–4 in) tail Habitat: Shrubland, inland wetlands, desert, and grassland Diet: Seeds and shoots, as well as insects	LC Unknown
Zacatecas harvest mouse	R. zacatecae Merriam, 1901	Western Mexico	Size: 6–7 cm (2–3 in) long, plus 6–9 cm (2–4 in) tail Habitat: Forest Diet: Seeds and shoots, as well as insects	LC Unknown

Genus Scotinomys – Thomas, 1913 – two species
Common name	Scientific name and subspecies	Range	Size and ecology	IUCN status and estimated population
Alston's brown mouse	S. teguina (Alston, 1876)	Southern Mexico and Central America	Size: 6–8 cm (2–3 in) long, plus 4–6 cm (2–2 in) tail Habitat: Forest Diet: Insects	LC Unknown
Chiriqui brown mouse	S. xerampelinus (Bangs, 1902)	Costa Rica and Panama	Size: 7–9 cm (3–4 in) long, plus 6–8 cm (2–3 in) tail Habitat: Forest and grassland Diet: Insects	LC Unknown

Genus Xenomys – Merriam, 1892 – one species
Common name	Scientific name and subspecies	Range	Size and ecology	IUCN status and estimated population
Magdalena rat	X. nelsoni Merriam, 1892	Southwestern Mexico	Size: 15–17 cm (6–7 in) long, plus 14–17 cm (6–7 in) tail Habitat: Forest Diet: Plant material and invertebrates	EN 30,000

== Sources ==
- Chernasky, Amy; Motis, Anna; Burgin, Connor, eds. (2023). All the Mammals of the World. Lynx Nature Books. ISBN 978-84-16728-66-4.
- Nowak, Ronald M. (1999). Walker's Mammals of the World. Vol. 2 (6th ed.). Johns Hopkins University Press. ISBN 978-0-8018-5789-8.
- Musser, Guy G.; Carleton, Michael D. (2005). Wilson, Don E.; Reeder, DeeAnn M. (eds.). Mammal Species of the World. Vol. 2 (3rd ed.). Johns Hopkins University Press. ISBN 978-0-8018-8221-0.
