= Big deer mouse =

Conservation status
- Near Threatened (IUCN 3.1)

Scientific classification
- Kingdom: Animalia
- Phylum: Chordata
- Class: Mammalia
- Order: Rodentia
- Family: Cricetidae
- Subfamily: Neotominae
- Genus: Peromyscus
- Species: P. grandis

Binomial name
- Peromyscus grandis Goodwin, 1932

Species of rodent

The big deer mouse, big deermouse, or giant deermouse (Peromyscus grandis) is a species of rodent in the family Cricetidae. It is a species of the genus Peromyscus, a closely related group of New World mice often called "deermice". It is endemic to Guatemala.
