= Transvolcanic deer mouse =

Conservation status
- Least Concern (IUCN 3.1)

Scientific classification
- Kingdom: Animalia
- Phylum: Chordata
- Class: Mammalia
- Order: Rodentia
- Family: Cricetidae
- Subfamily: Neotominae
- Genus: Peromyscus
- Species: P. hylocetes

Binomial name
- Peromyscus hylocetes Merriam, 1898

Species of rodent

The transvolcanic deer mouse or transvolcanic deermouse (Peromyscus hylocetes) is a species of rodent in the family Cricetidae. It is a species of the genus Peromyscus, a closely related group of New World mice often called "deermice". It is endemic to Mexico.

== Habitat ==
The Transvolcanic deer mouse is found from west central Jalisco eastwards to Mexico City and north Morelos in Mexico.
