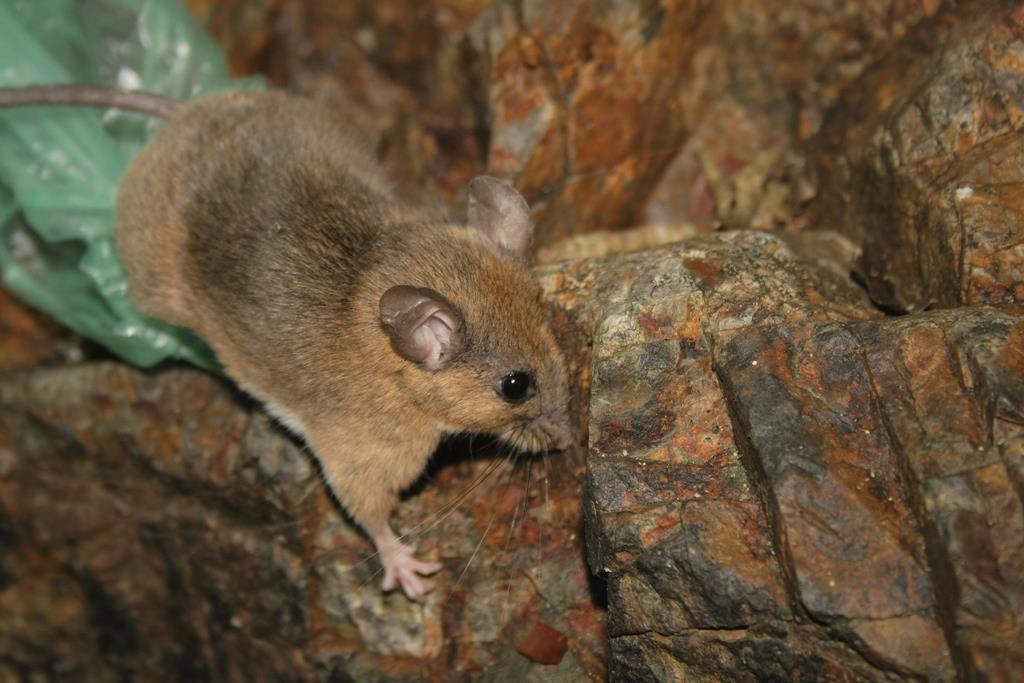

Conservation status
- Endangered (IUCN 3.1)

Scientific classification
- Kingdom: Animalia
- Phylum: Chordata
- Class: Mammalia
- Order: Rodentia
- Family: Cricetidae
- Subfamily: Neotominae
- Genus: Peromyscus
- Species: P. madrensis

Binomial name
- Peromyscus madrensis Merriam, 1898

= Tres Marías Island mouse =

Tres Marias island mouse

Species of rodent

The Tres Marías island mouse or Tres Marías deermouse (Peromyscus madrensis) is a species of rodent in the family Cricetidae. It is a species of the genus Peromyscus, a closely related group of New World mice often called "deermice". It is found only on the Islas Marías off the west coast of Mexico (part of the state of Nayarit). When last assessed, it was common on María Cleofás Island, but rare or absent on the other, more disturbed, islands.

== Description ==
The Tres Marías island mouse is the size of a small rat, with a head and body measuring 21 to 25 centimetres (8.3 to 9.8 in), and a tail 10 to 13 centimetres (3.9 to 5.1 in) in length. They have pale tan fur, with white underparts, lips, and feet. There is a faint stripe of darker fur towards the rear of the animal's back, and there are dark spots on the ankles. The tail has relatively little hair, and is noticeably darker on the upper surface. Females have six teats. Compared with other closely related species, it is larger, with a longer tail, smaller ears, and a smaller penis.

== Biology ==
Although found on all habitats on the islands, the Tres Marias island mouse is most common in undisturbed tropical deciduous forest, especially in the interior highlands. It lives in sheltered locations, such as under logs or rocks. Widespread on the islands when they were first described in 1898, a survey in 1991 showed a significantly reduced range for the mice, apparently due to the introduction of non-native species, such as black rats, deer, and goats.

The species is closely related to the Nayarit mouse, which inhabits the nearby mainland, with the two species diverging during the Pleistocene. It is unclear whether the mice first arrived on the islands by rafting from the mainland, or whether the islands were once connected to the mainland.
