= Dickey's deer mouse =

Conservation status
- Vulnerable (IUCN 3.1)

Scientific classification
- Kingdom: Animalia
- Phylum: Chordata
- Class: Mammalia
- Order: Rodentia
- Family: Cricetidae
- Subfamily: Neotominae
- Genus: Peromyscus
- Species: P. dickeyi

Binomial name
- Peromyscus dickeyi Burt, 1932

Species of rodent

Dickey's deer mouse or Dickey's deermouse (Peromyscus dickeyi) is a species of rodent in the family Cricetidae. It is a species of the genus Peromyscus, a closely related group of New World mice often called "deermice". It is endemic to Mexico, being found only on a small island in the Gulf of California. The species is named for Donald Dickey, who sponsored the expedition that first discovered the animal.

== Description ==
Dickey's deer mouse has a large body, with a total length of about 20 cm (7.9 in), including a relatively short tail, about 10 cm (3.9 in) long. The fur is dusky over most of the body, and was described as "pinkish cinnamon" in the first formal scientific description of the species. The underparts are white, sometimes with a faint spot in the chest region. The soles of the hindfeet are hairless. Dickey's deer mouse can most easily be distinguished from its close relatives on the mainland by its unusually short tail.

== Biology ==
Dickey's deer mouse is found only on the volcanic island of Isla Tortuga off the east coast of Baja California Sur. The island is covered by desert scrubland, with an area of only 6.3 km^{2} (2.4 sq mi), leaving the species highly vulnerable to extinction. Little is known of its biology, although pregnant individuals have been trapped in October, and are apparently absent in May.
