= Winkelmann's mouse =

Conservation status
- Endangered (IUCN 3.1)

Scientific classification
- Kingdom: Animalia
- Phylum: Chordata
- Class: Mammalia
- Order: Rodentia
- Family: Cricetidae
- Subfamily: Neotominae
- Genus: Peromyscus
- Species: P. winkelmanni

Binomial name
- Peromyscus winkelmanni Carleton, 1977

Species of rodent

Winkelmann's mouse (Peromyscus winkelmanni) is a species of rodent in the family Cricetidae, It is a species of the genus Peromyscus, a closely related group of New World mice often called "deermice". It is endemic to Mexico, and is named for John R. Winkelmann, who collected the first specimens.

== Description ==
Rather larger than a house mouse, an adult Winkelmann's mouse measures 24 to 27 cm (9.4 to 10.6 in) in total length, about half of which is the tail, and weighs around 54 g (1.9 oz). The fur is tawny mixed with black over most of the body, becoming darker on the back, sometimes forming a distinct black band in the center of the back, and fading to bright tan or cinnamon on the flanks and cheeks. The under parts are pale grey. The tail has only a thin covering of hair, typically darker on the upper than on the lower surface.

Compared with other, related, species, the ears are relatively small and dark in color, and the skull is slightly larger. However, Winkelmann's mouse can most readily be distinguished from its close relatives by the shape of its penis, which has a partially corrugated glans. Females have six teats.

== Distribution and habitat ==
Winkelmann's mouse is found only in a relatively small area of southern Michoacán in Mexico, where it inhabits isolated regions on the western slopes of the Sierra Madre Occidental. It lives in woodland patches of tall oak trees, mixed with pines. These areas have dense understories, and thick epiphytes, including patches of mosses, orchids, and bromeliads. There are no subspecies. Because it is only found in such a small area, and because much of the woodland on which it depends is currently subject to logging, it is formally considered an endangered species by the IUCN.
