= San Lorenzo mouse =

Conservation status
- Critically Endangered (IUCN 3.1)

Scientific classification
- Kingdom: Animalia
- Phylum: Chordata
- Class: Mammalia
- Order: Rodentia
- Family: Cricetidae
- Subfamily: Neotominae
- Genus: Peromyscus
- Species: P. interparietalis

Binomial name
- Peromyscus interparietalis Burt, 1932

Species of rodent

The San Lorenzo mouse (Peromyscus interparietalis) is a species of rodent in the family Cricetidae. It is a species of the genus Peromyscus, a closely related group of New World mice often called "deermice". It is endemic to Mexico, where it is found only from the islands of San Lorenzo Norte, San Lorenzo Sur, and Salsipuedes off the east coast of Baja California. The species is threatened by predation by feral and domestic cats, particularly on San Lorenzo Sur.
