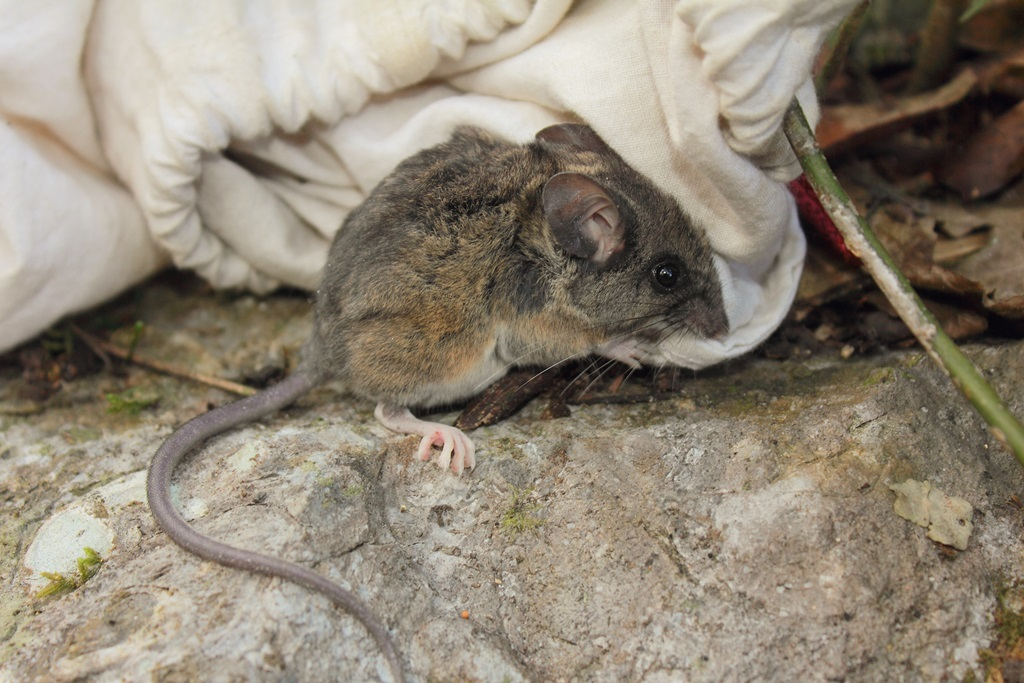

Conservation status
- Endangered (IUCN 3.1)

Scientific classification
- Kingdom: Animalia
- Phylum: Chordata
- Class: Mammalia
- Order: Rodentia
- Family: Cricetidae
- Subfamily: Neotominae
- Genus: Peromyscus
- Species: P. ochraventer

Binomial name
- Peromyscus ochraventer Baker, 1951

= El Carrizo deer mouse =

Species of rodent

The El Carrizo deer mouse or El Carrizo deermoue (Peromyscus ochraventer) is a species of rodent in the family Cricetidae. It is a species of the genus Peromyscus, a closely related group of New World mice often called "deermice". It is endemic to Mexico.
