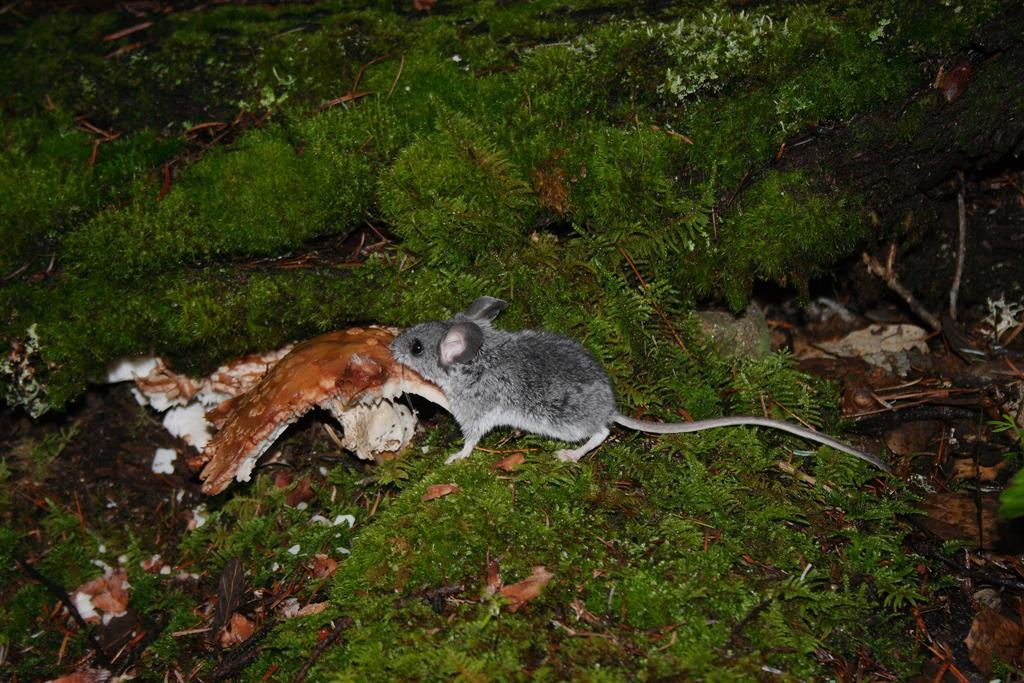

Conservation status
- Near Threatened (IUCN 3.1)

Scientific classification
- Kingdom: Animalia
- Phylum: Chordata
- Class: Mammalia
- Order: Rodentia
- Family: Cricetidae
- Subfamily: Neotominae
- Genus: Peromyscus
- Species: P. polius

Binomial name
- Peromyscus polius Osgood, 1904

= Chihuahuan mouse =

Species of rodent

The Chihuahuan mouse (Peromyscus polius) is a species of rodent in the family Cricetidae. It is a species of the genus Peromyscus, a closely related group of New World mice often called "deermice". It is found only in Mexico.
