= Chiapan deer mouse =

Conservation status
- Vulnerable (IUCN 3.1)

Scientific classification
- Kingdom: Animalia
- Phylum: Chordata
- Class: Mammalia
- Order: Rodentia
- Family: Cricetidae
- Subfamily: Neotominae
- Genus: Peromyscus
- Species: P. zarhynchus

Binomial name
- Peromyscus zarhynchus Merriam, 1898

Species of rodent

The Chiapan deer mouse or Chiapan deermouse (Peromyscus zarhynchus) is a species of rodent in the family Cricetidae. It is a species of the genus Peromyscus, a closely related group of New World mice often called "deermice". It is endemic to Mexico.

== Distribution and habitat ==
The Chiapan deer mouse is endemic to central and southeast Chiapas, México. The species occurs in wet highland cloud and pine-oak forest, where it inhabits forest stages ranging from mature forest to cutover areas at elevations between 1,400 m and 2,900 m. Below 2,200 m it only occurs in tall mature forests. Possible specimens from Guatemala have not yet been confirmed.

== Conservation ==
The Chiapan deer mouse is categorized as Vulnerable by the IUCN as suitable habitat in its restricted range is estimated to have shrunk by more than 50% in the last 30 years.
