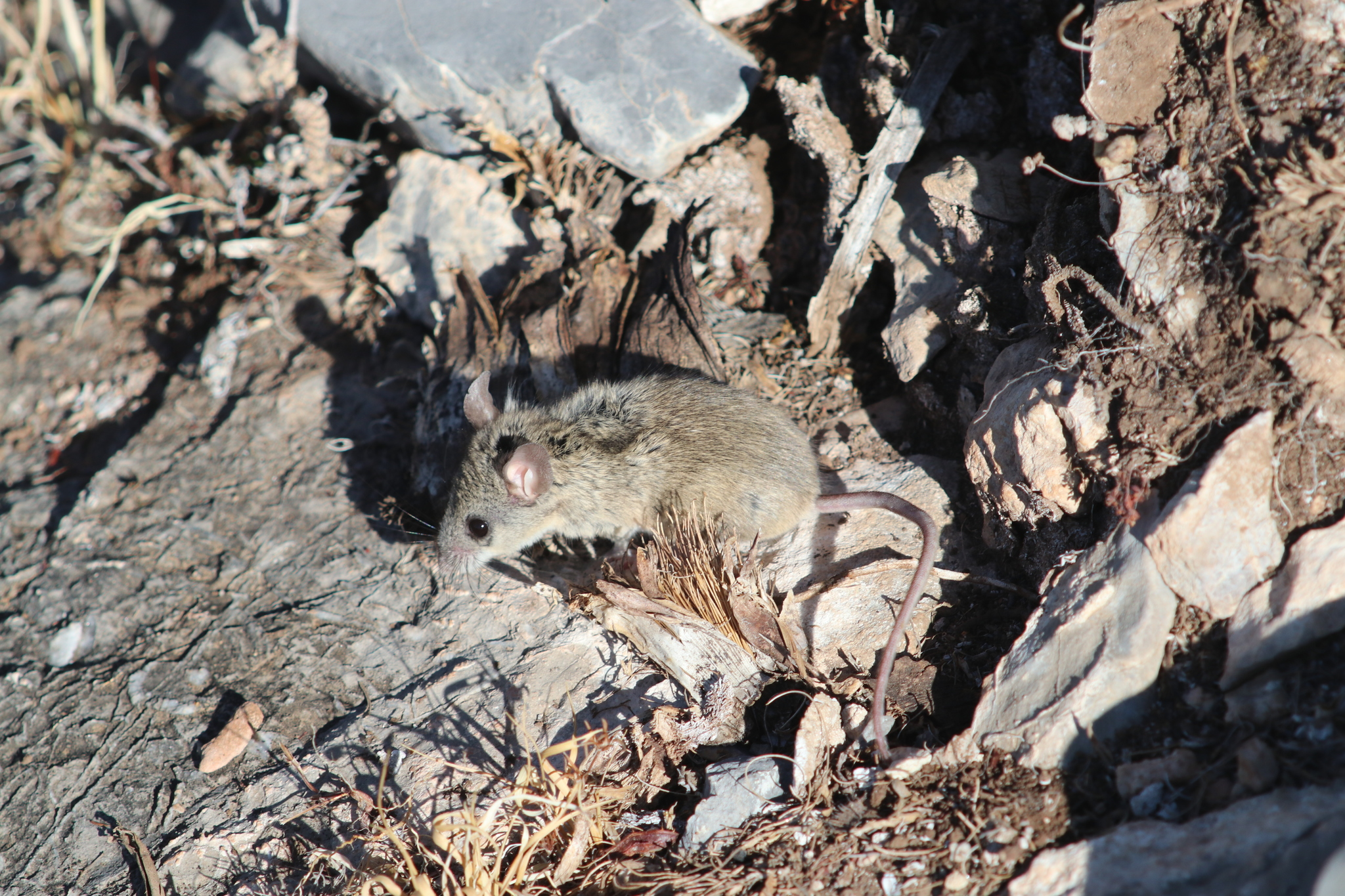

Conservation status
- Least Concern (IUCN 3.1)

Scientific classification
- Kingdom: Animalia
- Phylum: Chordata
- Class: Mammalia
- Order: Rodentia
- Family: Cricetidae
- Subfamily: Neotominae
- Genus: Peromyscus
- Species: P. hooperi

Binomial name
- Peromyscus hooperi Lee & Schmidly, 1977

= Hooper's mouse =

Species of rodent

Hooper's mouse (Peromyscus hooperi) is a species of rodent in the family Cricetidae. It is a species of the genus Peromyscus, a closely related group of New World mice often called "deermice". It is the only member of the Peromyscus hooperi species group, and is found only in Mexico. The species is named for Emmett Hooper, a researcher into the taxonomy of the genus Peromyscus.

== Description ==
Hooper's mouse is a medium-sized deer mouse, with a total length of 17 to 22 cm (6.7 to 8.7 in), including the 9 to 13 cm (3.5 to 5.1 in) tail. Adults have an average weight of 22 g (0.78 oz). The mouse is greyish in color, with a faint brownish tint, and has cream-colored underparts fading to white on the lower limbs. The tail is also darker above than below, but has only short hair. Females have six teats.

== Distribution and habitat ==
Hooper's mouse is endemic to Mexico, where it is found only in Coahuila and in neighboring regions of San Luis Potosí and Zacatecas. It lives in high altitude grasslands, between about 1,000 and 2,000 metres (3,300 and 6,600 ft) above sea level, above the scrublands of the Chihuahuan Desert, but below the montane chaparral habitats of the higher mountains. In addition to grass, this region is dominated by plants such as Dasylirion and Yucca. There are no subspecies.

== Biology ==
Females give birth to litters with an average of three young after a 33-day gestation. The young are born blind, hairless, and helpless. They begin to move after about five days, and open their eyes at thirteen days. Females undergo their first estrus at around 69 days.

The relationships between Hooper's mouse and other species of deer mouse are unclear. The shape of their teeth and of some of their scent glands resemble those of the eremicus species group, while the shape of the baculum and the position of the teats instead resemble those of the leucopus group. it is now usually considered the only member of its own species group, and may represent an evolutionary link between the other two species groups.
