= Pemberton's deer mouse =

Conservation status
- Extinct (1931) (IUCN 3.1)

Scientific classification
- Kingdom: Animalia
- Phylum: Chordata
- Class: Mammalia
- Infraclass: Placentalia
- Order: Rodentia
- Family: Cricetidae
- Subfamily: Neotominae
- Genus: Peromyscus
- Species: †P. pembertoni

Binomial name
- †Peromyscus pembertoni Burt, 1932

Extinct species of rodent

Pemberton's deer mouse or Pemberton's deermouse (Peromyscus pembertoni) is an extinct rodent in the family Cricetidae. It was a species of the genus Peromyscus, a closely related group of New World mice often called "deermice". It was endemic to San Pedro Nolasco Island (27.96749°N 111.37845°W) in the Gulf of California. The last 12 specimens were collected on 26 December 1931.

== Etymology ==
The generic name comes from the Ancient Greek pero = "boots", mys meaning "mouse", hence the "mouse with boots", referring to the white feet.

== Description ==
Peromyscus pembertoni is a medium-sized deer mouse. No significant sexual dimorphism is evident. The tail is usually longer than the head, and the body is bicolored. It is well-haired, and tufted at the end. The hind feet are small and similar in length to the ear, but sometimes longer. The skull is medium-sized, and auditory bullae are not greatly inflated. The upper parts of the pelage are medium brown; the sides are lighter brown with a broad orange lateral line extending from the cheek to the hindquarters; the under parts are whitish, the ankles dusky gray, and the feet whitish below ankle.

== General information ==
Peromyscus species, also known as deer mice, are common North American mammals. They tend to occupy in range from Alaska to Central America in many different habitats. Because they are so abundant in nature, these mice constitute a large component of the Nearctic ecosystems. These mice have great importance to scientific research, both the wild type and genetic variants have been used for laboratory researches. They are not closely related to the house mouse and the rats.

Pemberton's deer mouse is a very cold-tolerant species; they live and survive in temperatures between 22 and 25 °C. They are usually sexually mature by 55 days of age. Gestation is 23 days, except in lactating, females when it is delayed by four to six days to 28 or 30 days. P. pembertoni breeds in mated pairs.

== Habitat ==
This species is poorly known. The only island that supported two different species of Peromyscus - P. pembertoni and P. boylii - was San Pedro Nolasco. Besides these two species, no other mammals occurred on the island. They were collected on a steep hill covered with grass on the eastern side of the island. The dominant plants found there were tree torote, pitayita, liga, Adam's tree, leather plant, fishhook cactus, malva rosa, chain fruit cholla, cardon, slipper plant, jojoba, and organpipe cactus.

== Reproduction ==
The social behavior of P. pembertoni is unknown. Breeding probably occurred throughout most of the year, although the majority of young would have been born in spring and early summer. Breeding may have ceased during winter months.

== Communication and perception ==
Like other Peromyscus species, they probably had keen eyesight and vision, and used chemical cues extensively in communication.

== Predation ==
P. pembertoni would have escaped predation through its nocturnal and secretive habits.

== Lifespan ==
The longevity of P. pembertoni was probably short, with it unlikely that more than a few would live more than one year under natural conditions.
