= Burt's deer mouse =

Conservation status
- Critically Endangered (IUCN 3.1)

Scientific classification
- Kingdom: Animalia
- Phylum: Chordata
- Class: Mammalia
- Order: Rodentia
- Family: Cricetidae
- Subfamily: Neotominae
- Genus: Peromyscus
- Species: P. caniceps

Binomial name
- Peromyscus caniceps Burt, 1932

Species of rodent

Burt's deer mouse or Burt's deermouse (Peromyscus caniceps) is a species of rodent in the family Cricetidae. It is a species of the genus Peromyscus, a closely related group of New World mice often called "deermice". It is endemic to Mexico, where it is found only on Montserrat Island off the east coast of Baja California Sur. The species is threatened by predation by feral cats.
