= False canyon mouse =

Conservation status
- Critically Endangered (IUCN 3.1)

Scientific classification
- Kingdom: Animalia
- Phylum: Chordata
- Class: Mammalia
- Infraclass: Placentalia
- Order: Rodentia
- Family: Cricetidae
- Subfamily: Neotominae
- Genus: Peromyscus
- Species: P. pseudocrinitus

Binomial name
- Peromyscus pseudocrinitus Burt, 1932

Species of rodent

The false canyon mouse or Coronado's deermouse (Peromyscus pseudocrinitus), is a species of rodent in the family Cricetidae. It is a species of the genus Peromyscus, a closely related group of New World mice often called "deermice". It is known only from Coronados Island, a small island in the Gulf of California, part of Baja California Sur, Mexico. The species is threatened by predation by feral cats, and the IUCN has assessed its conservation status as "critically endangered".

== Description ==
The false canyon mouse grows to a total length of about 194 mm (7.6 in) including a tail of 110 mm (4.3 in). The dorsal fur is greyish-black glossed with cinnamon, and the underparts are white. The tail is scantily clad with hairs; the top half is blackish while the bottom side is pale, except for near the tip where it is dark both above and below. The skull resembles that of the canyon mouse (Peromyscus crinitus) but is longer and narrower. The false canyon mouse has the darkest colouring of any of the members of the genus Peromyscus that live on the string of islands in the Gulf of California. Similar mice inhabit other islands in the Gulf and the colour of each species tends to resemble that of the surrounding rocks and sand; the rocks on Isla Coronados are dark.

== Distribution and habitat ==
This mouse is endemic to Coronados Island in the state of Baja California Sur, Mexico. This is an uninhabited island, a strip of land of volcanic origin some 3 km (1.9 mi) long and 2.5 km (1.6 mi) wide. The east side of the island has steep cliffs, and the southwestern corner has a long sandy spit that stretches away towards the mainland. The island has much rock and the vegetation is arid scrub. The mice are to be found burrowing in the sandy spit and living among the rocks.

== Status ==
Peromyscus pseudocrinitus is threatened by feral cats that live on the island. It is thought these have caused a decline in the population of the species, and another species of mouse that used to be present on the island has become locally extinct. In 1989, researchers were unable to find any false canyon mice on the island, but in 1994, twenty were located in a single night. Because of their small area of occupancy and their small total number, the International Union for Conservation of Nature has assessed their conservation status as "critically endangered".
