= San Esteban Island mouse =

Conservation status
- Critically Endangered (IUCN 3.1)

Scientific classification
- Kingdom: Animalia
- Phylum: Chordata
- Class: Mammalia
- Order: Rodentia
- Family: Cricetidae
- Subfamily: Neotominae
- Genus: Peromyscus
- Species: P. stephani

Binomial name
- Peromyscus stephani Townsend, 1912

Species of rodent

The San Esteban Island mouse (Peromyscus stephani) is a species of rodent in the family Cricetidae. It is a species of the genus Peromyscus, a closely related group of New World mice often called "deermice". It is endemic to Mexico, where it is known only from San Esteban Island in the northern Gulf of California.
