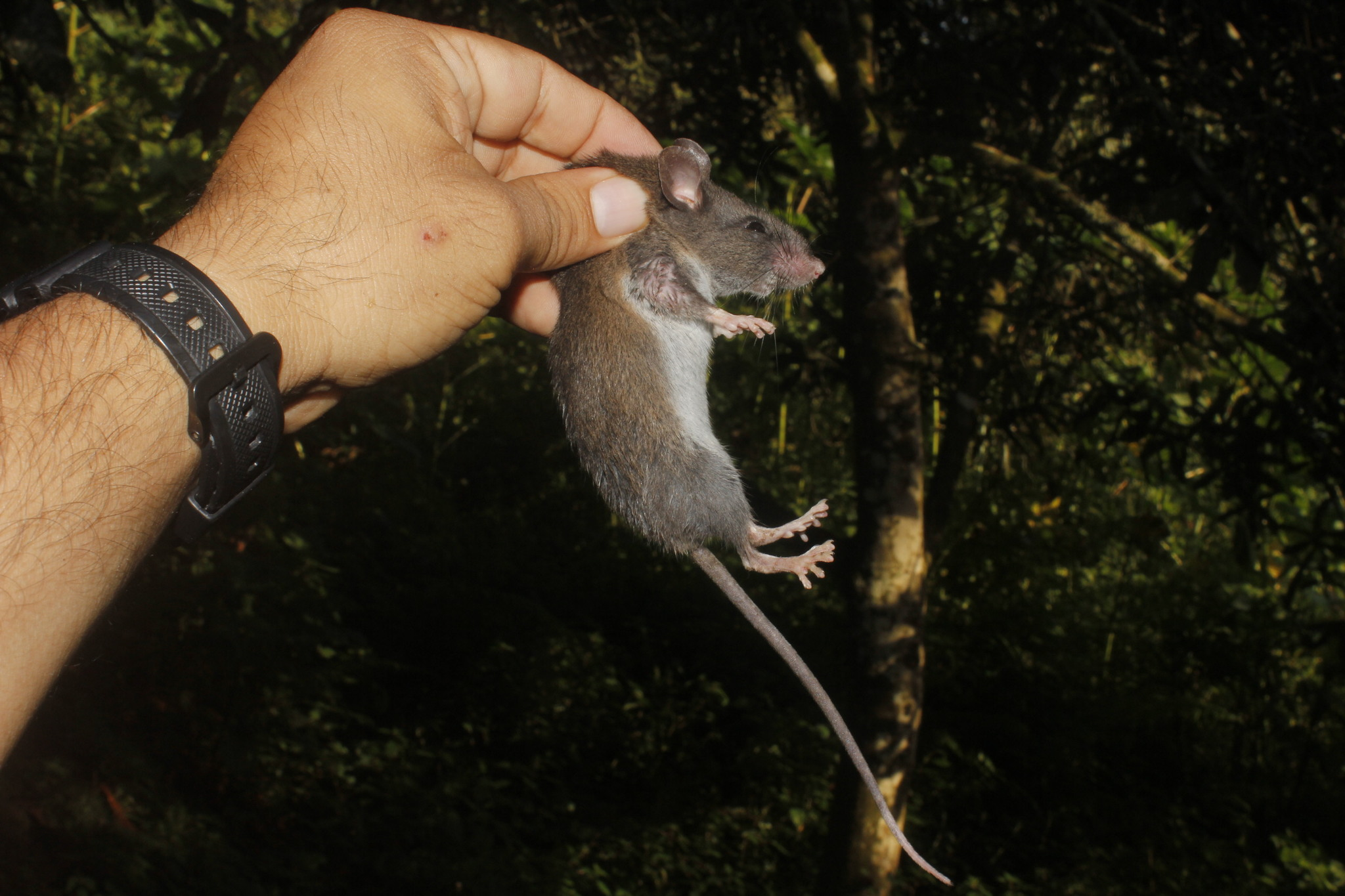

Conservation status
- Data Deficient (IUCN 3.1)

Scientific classification
- Kingdom: Animalia
- Phylum: Chordata
- Class: Mammalia
- Order: Rodentia
- Family: Cricetidae
- Subfamily: Neotominae
- Genus: Peromyscus
- Species: P. furvus

Binomial name
- Peromyscus furvus J.A. Allen & Chapman, 1897

= Blackish deer mouse =

Species of rodent

The blackish deer mouse or blackish deermouse (Peromyscus furvus) is a species of rodent in the family Cricetidae. It is a species of the genus Peromyscus, a closely related group of New World mice often called "deermice". It is endemic to Mexico, and is relatively poorly studied.

== Description ==
The blackish deer mouse is a relatively large member of its genus, with a total length of 24 to 28 cm (9.4 to 11.0 in), including the 11-to-14 cm (4.3-to-5.5 in) tail; males are slightly larger than females. As the common name implies, the fur over most of the head and body is a mixture of black and dark brown, giving the animal an overall color that has been described as bistre. However, the feet, and some cases, the tip of the tail, are white, and the underparts are pale grey. There is a ring of pure black fur around the eyes, while the tail has only a sparse covering of hair. The female has six teats, two in the axillary region, and four in the inguinal region.

They are herbivorous, and have been recorded as eating pokeweed fruit and blackberries. They are believed to either breed year-round, or, at least, to have a prolonged breeding season that lasts for much of the year.

== Distribution and habitat ==
The blackish deer mouse is endemic to Mexico, where it inhabits cloud forests, and in nearby forests dominated by oak and pine. It prefers environments with heavy undergrowth or cover in the form of rocky cliffs, small caves, or fallen logs. Although its exact range is unclear, it has been collected from the eastern slopes of the Sierra Madre Oriental mountains between 650 and 2,900 m (2,130 and 9,510 ft) elevation, from San Luis Potosi in the north to Oaxaca in the south.

There are no formally recognised subspecies, although genetic analysis of specimens collected in Oaxaca has shown these may represent an entirely separate species, which has yet to be scientifically described.
