= Tawny deer mouse =

Conservation status
- Least Concern (IUCN 3.1)

Scientific classification
- Kingdom: Animalia
- Phylum: Chordata
- Class: Mammalia
- Order: Rodentia
- Family: Cricetidae
- Subfamily: Neotominae
- Genus: Peromyscus
- Species: P. perfulvus

Binomial name
- Peromyscus perfulvus Osgood, 1945

Synonyms
- Peromyscus chrysopus

Species of rodent

The tawny deer mouse, tawny deermouse, or marsh mouse (Peromyscus perfulvus) is a species of rodent in the family Cricetidae. It is a species of the genus Peromyscus, a closely related group of New World mice often called "deermice". It is endemic to Mexico.

== Characteristics ==
The tawny deer mouse has a typical mouse-like form, with a long, hairy tail. It has reddish-cinnamon fur over most of its body, and pale creamy underparts. The face is greyish with a slight ring of darker fur around the eyes, and the tail is sepia-brown in colour. It can be distinguished from its closest relatives by the length of the tail and by the presence of brownish fur on parts of the hind feet, which are pure white in other species. It ranges from 10 to 12 cm (3.9 to 4.7 in) in head-body length, with a 10-to-14 cm (3.9-to-5.5 in) tail. Adults weigh between 30 and 42 g (1.1 and 1.5 oz).

== Distribution and habitat ==
The tawny deer mouse is native only to a small region in west-central Mexico. It is found from Jalisco in the north, along the coast to the northernmost parts of Guerrero in the south, and also inland in Michoacán and the west of the State of Mexico. It inhabits tropical deciduous forests and other dense vegetation below 1,300 m (4,300 ft) altitude. As its alternative common name of "marsh mouse" implies, it is generally found in wet habitats, such as near lakes, streams, or man-made irrigation, and it has also been reported from tropical fruit orchards and sugar cane plantations.

Two subspecies are recognised:

- P. p. perfulvus - Michoacán, State of Mexico, Guerrero
- P. p. chrysopus - Jalisco, Colima

== Biology ==
Tawny deer mice are nocturnal and solitary, and spend much of their time in trees, although they also travel along the ground. They are omnivorous, feeding on seeds, fruit, and insects. They construct spherical nests from grasses and other plant materials, concealing them in trees or amongst dense undergrowth, and rarely travel far from their homes, ranging over an area of no more than about 70 m (230 ft) across. While population densities vary throughout the year, depending on the local environment, they are typically no higher than about 15/ha (6/acre). Known predators include the ocelot.

Breeding occurs throughout the year, with females giving birth to up to four young after a gestation period of between 39 and 46 days. At birth, the young are hairless and blind, weighing just 2 to 3 g (0.071 to 0.106 oz). They are weaned at about 25 days, and reach full adult size after about six or seven weeks.
