= Maya mouse =

Conservation status
- Critically Endangered (IUCN 3.1)

Scientific classification
- Kingdom: Animalia
- Phylum: Chordata
- Class: Mammalia
- Order: Rodentia
- Family: Cricetidae
- Subfamily: Neotominae
- Genus: Peromyscus
- Species: P. mayensis

Binomial name
- Peromyscus mayensis Carleton & Huckaby, 1975

Endangered species of Mesoamerican rodent

The Maya mouse (Peromyscus mayensis) or Maya deer mouse is a species of rodent in the family Cricetidae. It is a species of the genus Peromyscus, a closely related group of New World mice often called deermice. It is endemic to the department of Huehuetenango, Guatemala with a very limited known range.

== Range distribution ==
The Maya mouse lives in mature oak forests on the Cerro Wowi, a peak in the depoartment of Huehuetenango, Guatemala about 7 km northwest of the town of Santa Eulalia. This mouse has only been found in a small area around the location where it was first described to Science in 1975.

This mouse is endemic to elevations between 2,900 and 3,000 m (9,500 and 9,800 ft) and is not found at adjacent lower elevation forests. According to the IUCN redlist, the total known extent of occurrence of this species is less than 89 square kilometers.

== Habitat and ecology ==
This mouse has been found in mature, montane pine-oak cloud forest. The primarily oak forest habitat is abundant in epiphytes, fallen trees, and a deep layer of leaf litter. This species particularly inhabits areas with heavy layers of leaves and moss.

Its biology is poorly known. It is terrestrial, and burrows through the leaf litter under and along decaying logs and tree roots. It relies on this layer of detritus for tunneling and foraging, this habitat is characteristic in elevations above 2,900 m (9,500 ft) where colder temperatures slow decomposition and aid in accumulating deep leaf litter. Without this thick blanket of leaves, the mouse would likely be more vulnerable to predation and have less area to forage.

=== Diet ===
The Maya deer mouse feeds on fleshy fruit and other plants, as well as on insects. One study of six individuals observed during the dry season revealed a herbivorous diet.

=== Reproduction ===
The Maya mouse appears to reproduce more frequently during the warmer months (April–June) than during the colder season of December. During one field study, pregnant female deer mice were found in May and average around 2 pinkies per brood of offspring. During another research expedition in December, all individuals studied were non-reproductive.

== Conservation ==
This species is listed as critically endangered by the IUCN redlist. This is due to the fact that its range is so limited. Additionally, the forests where this species inhabits are under severe impact of subsistence firewood harvesting and logging for oak and other hardwoods. Most reforestation efforts have historically planted only pines to mitigate deforestation, which over time has led to a change in the forest composition and the makeup of the leaf-litter that is the necessary habitat of the Maya mouse.
