= Osgood's mouse =

Conservation status
- Least Concern (IUCN 3.1)

- Apparently Secure (NatureServe)

Scientific classification
- Kingdom: Animalia
- Phylum: Chordata
- Class: Mammalia
- Order: Rodentia
- Family: Cricetidae
- Subfamily: Neotominae
- Genus: Peromyscus
- Species: P. gratus

Binomial name
- Peromyscus gratus Merriam, 1898

Species of rodent

Osgood's mouse (Peromyscus gratus) is a species of rodent in the family Cricetidae. It is a species of the genus Peromyscus, a closely related group of New World mice often called "deermice". It is endemic to Mexico. Its name references Wilfred Hudson Osgood.
