= Orizaba deer mouse =

Conservation status
- Least Concern (IUCN 3.1)

Scientific classification
- Kingdom: Animalia
- Phylum: Chordata
- Class: Mammalia
- Order: Rodentia
- Family: Cricetidae
- Subfamily: Neotominae
- Genus: Peromyscus
- Species: P. beatae

Binomial name
- Peromyscus beatae Thomas, 1903

Species of rodent

The Orizaba deer mouse or Orizaba deermouse (Peromyscus beatae) is a small species of rodent in the family Cricetidae. It is a species of the genus Peromyscus, a closely related group of New World mice often called "deermice". It is native to El Salvador, Guatemala, Honduras, and Mexico. It is found in thorn scrub and favors rocky areas with brush and scattered trees. They are nocturnal, and have been discovered to feed on arthropods, seeds, and green plant material. Breeding takes place year-round, and the mean litter size is two to three young in Oaxaca, Mexico. It is known to be a terrestrial animal.
