= Short-nosed harvest mouse =

Conservation status
- Least Concern (IUCN 3.1)

Scientific classification
- Kingdom: Animalia
- Phylum: Chordata
- Class: Mammalia
- Order: Rodentia
- Family: Cricetidae
- Subfamily: Neotominae
- Genus: Reithrodontomys
- Species: R. brevirostris

Binomial name
- Reithrodontomys brevirostris Goodwin, 1943

Species of rodent

The short-nosed harvest mouse (Reithrodontomys brevirostris) is a species of rodent in the family Cricetidae found in Costa Rica and Nicaragua. It is currently of Least Concern in endangerment status.
