= Tamaulipan woodrat =

Conservation status
- Near Threatened (IUCN 3.1)

Scientific classification
- Kingdom: Animalia
- Phylum: Chordata
- Class: Mammalia
- Order: Rodentia
- Family: Cricetidae
- Subfamily: Neotominae
- Genus: Neotoma
- Species: N. angustapalata

Binomial name
- Neotoma angustapalata Baker, 1951

Species of rodent

The Tamaulipan woodrat (Neotoma angustapalata) is a species of rodent in the family Cricetidae. It is found only in Mexico. It is endemic to the Sierra Madre Oriental in the Mexican states of Tamaulipas and San Luis Potosí.
