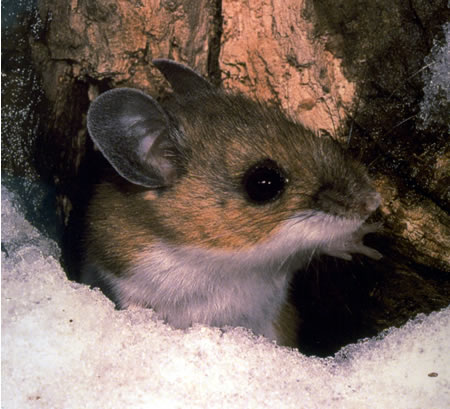
- Peromyscus maniculatus

Scientific classification
- Kingdom: Animalia
- Phylum: Chordata
- Class: Mammalia
- Order: Rodentia
- Family: Cricetidae
- Subfamily: Neotominae; Merriam, 1894

Tribes
- Baiomyini; Neotomini; Ochrotomyini; Reithrodontomyini

= Neotominae =

Neotominae Temporal range: Late Miocene - Recent

Subfamily of mammals

The Neotominae are a subfamily of the family Cricetidae. They consist of four tribes, 16 genera, and many species of New World rats and mice, predominantly found in North America. Among them are the well-known deer mice, packrats, and grasshopper mice.

Neotomines are related to the other two subfamilies of mice in the New World, the Sigmodontinae and Tylomyinae.

== Taxonomy ==
- SUBFAMILY NEOTOMINAE
  - Tribe Baiomyini
    - Genus Baiomys - pygmy mice
      - Southern pygmy mouse, Baiomys brunneus
      - Mexican pygmy mouse, Baiomys musculus
      - Northern pygmy mouse, Baiomys taylori
    - Genus Scotinomys - brown mice
      - Alston's brown mouse, Scotinomys teguina
      - Chiriqui brown mouse, Scotinomys xerampelinus
  - Tribe Neotomini
    - Genus Neotoma - pack rats
      - Subgenus Neotoma
        - White-throated woodrat, Neotoma albigula
        - Tamaulipan woodrat, Neotoma angustapalata
        - †Anthony's woodrat, Neotoma anthonyi
        - Bryant's woodrat, Neotoma bryanti
        - †Bunker's woodrat, Neotoma bunkeri
        - Nicaraguan woodrat, Neotoma chrysomelas
        - Arizona woodrat, Neotoma devia
        - Guatemala woodrat, Neotoma ferruginea
        - Eastern woodrat, Neotoma floridana
        - Dusky-footed woodrat, Neotoma fuscipes
        - Goldman's woodrat, Neotoma goldmani
        - Desert woodrat, Neotoma lepida
        - White-toothed woodrat, Neotoma leucodon
        - Big-eared woodrat, Neotoma macrotis
        - Allegheny woodrat, Neotoma magister
        - †San Martin Island woodrat, Neotoma martinensis
        - Mexican woodrat, Neotoma mexicana
        - Southern Plains woodrat, Neotoma micropus
        - Nelson's woodrat, Neotoma nelsoni
        - Bolaños woodrat, Neotoma palatina
        - Stephens' woodrat, Neotoma stephensi
      - Subgenus Teanopus
        - Sonoran woodrat, Neotoma phenax
      - Subgenus Teonoma
        - Bushy-tailed woodrat, Neotoma cinerea
    - Genus Xenomys
      - Magdalena rat, Xenomys nelsoni
    - Genus Hodomys
      - Allen's woodrat, Hodomys alleni
    - Genus Nelsonia - diminutive woodrats
      - Goldman's diminutive woodrat, Nelsonia goldmani
      - Diminutive woodrat, Nelsonia neotomodon
  - Tribe Ochrotomyini
    - Genus Ochrotomys
      - Golden mouse, Ochrotomys nuttalli
  - Tribe Reithrodontomyini
    - Genus Peromyscus - deer mice
      - californicus group
        - California mouse, Peromyscus californicus
      - eremicus group
        - Cactus mouse, Peromyscus eremicus
        - Angel Island mouse, Peromyscus guardia
        - San Lorenzo mouse, Peromyscus interparietalis
        - Northern Baja deer mouse, Peromyscus fraterculus
        - Dickey's deer mouse, Peromyscus dickeyi
        - False canyon mouse, Peromyscus pseudocrinitus
        - Eva's desert mouse, Peromyscus eva
        - Burt's deer mouse, Peromyscus caniceps
        - Mesquite mouse, Peromyscus merriami
        - †Pemberton's deer mouse, Peromyscus pembertoni
      - hooperi group
        - Hooper's mouse, Peromyscus hooperi
      - crinitus group
        - Canyon mouse, Peromyscus crinitus
      - maniculatus group
        - Eastern deermouse, Peromyscus maniculatus
        - Oldfield mouse, Peromyscus polionotus
        - Santa Cruz mouse, Peromyscus sejugis
        - Northwestern deer mouse, Peromyscus keeni
        - Black-eared mouse, Peromyscus melanotis
        - Slevin's mouse, Peromyscus slevini
        - †Giant island deer mouse, Peromyscus nesodytes
      - leucopus group
        - White-footed mouse, Peromyscus leucopus
        - Cotton mouse, Peromyscus gossypinus
      - aztecus group
        - Aztec mouse, Peromyscus aztecus
        - Gleaning mouse, Peromyscus spicilegus
        - Winkelmann's mouse, Peromyscus winkelmanni
      - boylii group
        - Brush mouse, Peromyscus boylii
        - Nimble-footed mouse, Peromyscus levipes
        - Orizaba deer mouse, Peromyscus beatae
        - Schmidly's deer mouse, Peromyscus schmidlyi
        - San Esteban Island mouse, Peromyscus stephani
        - Texas mouse, Peromyscus attwateri
        - Nayarit mouse, Peromyscus simulus
        - Tres Marias Island mouse, Peromyscus madrensis
        - White-ankled mouse, Peromyscus pectoralis
        - Chihuahuan mouse, Peromyscus polius
      - truei group
        - Pinyon mouse, Peromyscus truei
        - Osgood's mouse, Peromyscus gratus
        - Perote mouse, Peromyscus bullatus
        - Zacatecan deer mouse, Peromyscus difficilis
        - Northern rock mouse, Peromyscus nasutus
      - melanophrys group
        - Plateau mouse, Peromyscus melanophrys
        - Tawny deer mouse, Peromyscus perfulvus
        - Puebla deer mouse, Peromyscus mekisturus
      - furvus group
        - Blackish deer mouse, Peromyscus furvus
        - El Carrizo deer mouse, Peromyscus ochraventer
        - Maya mouse, Peromyscus mayensis
      - megalops group
        - Brown deer mouse, Peromyscus megalops
        - Black-tailed mouse, Peromyscus melanurus
        - Zempoaltepec, Peromyscus melanocarpus
      - mexicanus group
        - Mexican deer mouse, Peromyscus mexicanus
        - Naked-eared deer mouse, Peromyscus gymnotis
        - Guatemalan deer mouse, Peromyscus guatemalensis
        - Chiapan deer mouse, Peromyscus zarhynchus
        - Big deer mouse, Peromyscus grandis
        - Yucatan deer mouse, Peromyscus yucatanicus
        - Stirton's deer mouse, Peromyscus stirtoni
        - Transvolcanic deer mouse, Peromyscus hylocetes
    - Genus Reithrodontomys - New World harvest mice
      - Guerrero harvest mouse, Reithrodontomys bakeri
      - Short-nosed harvest mouse, Reithrodontomys brevirostris
      - Sonoran harvest mouse, Reithrodontomys burti
      - Volcano harvest mouse, Reithrodontomys chrysopsis
      - Chiriqui harvest mouse, Reithrodontomys creper
      - Darien harvest mouse, Reithrodontomys darienensis
      - Fulvous harvest mouse, Reithrodontomys fulvescens
      - Slender harvest mouse, Reithrodontomys gracilis
      - Hairy harvest mouse, Reithrodontomys hirsutus
      - Eastern harvest mouse, Reithrodontomys humulis
      - Western harvest mouse, Reithrodontomys megalotis
      - Mexican harvest mouse, Reithrodontomys mexicanus
      - Small-toothed harvest mouse, Reithrodontomys microdon
      - Plains harvest mouse, Reithrodontomys montanus
      - Reithrodontomys musseri
      - Nicaraguan harvest mouse, Reithrodontomys paradoxus
      - Salt marsh harvest mouse, Reithrodontomys raviventris
      - Rodriguez's harvest mouse, Reithrodontomys rodriguezi
      - Cozumel harvest mouse, Reithrodontomys spectabilis
      - Sumichrast's harvest mouse, Reithrodontomys sumichrasti
      - Narrow-nosed harvest mouse, Reithrodontomys tenuirostris
      - Zacatecas harvest mouse, Reithrodontomys zacatecae
    - Genus Onychomys - grasshopper mice
      - Chihuahuan grasshopper mouse, Onychomys arenicola
      - Northern grasshopper mouse, Onychomys leucogaster
      - Southern grasshopper mouse, Onychomys torridus
    - Genus Neotomodon
      - Mexican volcano mouse, Neotomodon alstoni
    - Genus Podomys
      - Florida mouse, Podomys floridanus
    - Genus Isthmomys - isthmus rats
      - Yellow isthmus rat, Isthmomys flavidus
      - Mount Pirri isthmus rat, Isthmomys pirrensis
    - Genus Megadontomys - giant deer mice
      - Oaxaca giant deer mouse, Megadontomys cryophilus
      - Nelson's giant deer mouse, Megadontomys nelsoni
      - Thomas's giant deer mouse, Megadontomys thomasi
    - Genus Habromys - deer mice
      - Chinanteco deer mouse, Habromys chinanteco
      - Delicate deer mouse, Habromys delicatulus
      - Ixtlán deer mouse, Habromys ixtlani
      - Zempoaltepec deer mouse, Habromys lepturus
      - Crested-tailed deer mouse, Habromys lophurus
      - Habromys schmidlyi
      - Jico deer mouse, Habromys simulatus
    - Genus Osgoodomys
      - Michoacan deer mouse, Osgoodomys banderanus
- Incertae sedis
  - †Protorepomys
  - †Tsaphanomys

== See also ==
- New World rats and mice
