= Bolaños woodrat =

Conservation status
- Vulnerable (IUCN 3.1)

Scientific classification
- Kingdom: Animalia
- Phylum: Chordata
- Class: Mammalia
- Order: Rodentia
- Family: Cricetidae
- Subfamily: Neotominae
- Genus: Neotoma
- Species: N. palatina

Binomial name
- Neotoma palatina Goldman, 1905

Species of rodent

The Bolaños woodrat (Neotoma palatina) is a species of rodent in the family Cricetidae found only in Mexico.
