= Narrow-nosed harvest mouse =

Conservation status
- Endangered (IUCN 3.1)

Scientific classification
- Kingdom: Animalia
- Phylum: Chordata
- Class: Mammalia
- Order: Rodentia
- Family: Cricetidae
- Subfamily: Neotominae
- Genus: Reithrodontomys
- Species: R. tenuirostris

Binomial name
- Reithrodontomys tenuirostris Merriam, 1901

Species of rodent

The narrow-nosed harvest mouse (Reithrodontomys tenuirostris) is a species of rodent in the family Cricetidae. It is found in Guatemala and Mexico.
