= Rodriguez's harvest mouse =

Conservation status
- Least Concern (IUCN 3.1)

Scientific classification
- Kingdom: Animalia
- Phylum: Chordata
- Class: Mammalia
- Order: Rodentia
- Family: Cricetidae
- Subfamily: Neotominae
- Genus: Reithrodontomys
- Species: R. rodriguezi

Binomial name
- Reithrodontomys rodriguezi Goodwin, 1943

Species of rodent

Rodriguez's harvest mouse (Reithrodontomys rodriguezi) is a species of rodent in the family Cricetidae. It is found only in Costa Rica.
