= Small harvest mouse =

Conservation status
- Data Deficient (IUCN 3.1)

Scientific classification
- Kingdom: Animalia
- Phylum: Chordata
- Class: Mammalia
- Order: Rodentia
- Family: Cricetidae
- Subfamily: Neotominae
- Genus: Reithrodontomys
- Species: R. musseri

Binomial name
- Reithrodontomys musseri Gardner & Carleton, 2009

Species of rodent

The small harvest mouse (Reithrodontomys musseri) is a species of rodent in the family Cricetidae. It is found in central Costa Rica.
