= Chiriqui harvest mouse =

Conservation status
- Least Concern (IUCN 3.1)

Scientific classification
- Kingdom: Animalia
- Phylum: Chordata
- Class: Mammalia
- Order: Rodentia
- Family: Cricetidae
- Subfamily: Neotominae
- Genus: Reithrodontomys
- Species: R. creper

Binomial name
- Reithrodontomys creper Bangs, 1902

Species of rodent

The Chiriqui harvest mouse (Reithrodontomys creper) is a species of rodent in the family Cricetidae. It is found in Costa Rica and Panama.
