= William Henry Burt =

United States Army general

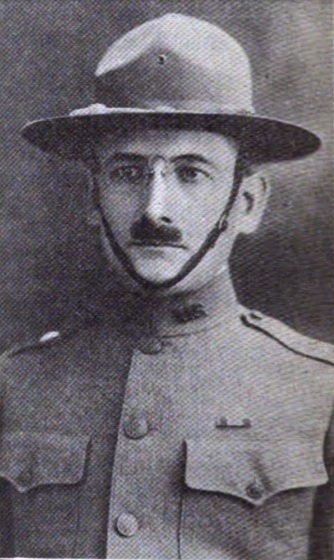
- From October 1918's U. V. M. Notes
- Born: February 22, 1876; Provincetown, Massachusetts, US
- Died: November 21, 1940 (aged 64); Westwood, Massachusetts, US
- Burial place: Arlington National Cemetery
- Spouse: Ethelyn Marie Bunker (m. 1901–1934, her death)
- Children: 1
- Military career
- Allegiance: United States
- Branch: United States Army
- Service years: 1898–1934
- Rank: Brigadier general
- Service number: O-1253

William Henry Burt (February 22, 1876 – November 21, 1940) was a career United States Army officer who served as a brigadier general throughout World War I.

== Early life ==
Burt was born in Provincetown, Massachusetts. He graduated from Taunton High School in Taunton, Massachusetts in 1893. Burt received an A.B. degree from the University of Vermont in 1898. Later that year he enlisted for the Spanish–American War as a corporal in Company M, 1st Vermont Infantry Regiment.

== Military career ==
Burt was commissioned a second lieutenant in the 43rd United States Volunteer Infantry in September 1899. He received a regular army commission in the artillery corps on July 1, 1901, and he graduated from the Artillery School in 1904. When the artillery was divided into Field and Coast Artillery in 1907, Burt was assigned to the 21st Field Artillery Brigade.

Burt remained in that unit until 1918, when he was transferred to the 4th Field Artillery Brigade. He was in that unit until his promotion to brigadier general on August 8, 1918. He served in France for eighteen months during the war. He was discharged as a brigadier general on March 10, 1919.

After being discharged Burt transferred to the Finance Department. In the month of July 1920 he transferred to Field Artillery and became a colonel. In 1920 he graduated from the School of the Line, and in 1921 he graduated from the General Staff School. Burt graduated from the Army War College in 1924, and in 1932 he was on duty as field artillery officer in the Seventh Corp's Area headquarters in Chicago, Illinois. The remainder of his active service was served in the Inspector General's Department, serving in California, Mississippi, Kansas, South Carolina, and Texas. On September 30, 1934, Burt retired for disability.

== Death and burial ==
Burt was visiting his brother-in-law Dr. Sidney Bunker when he died in Westwood, Massachusetts, on November 21, 1940. He was buried at Arlington National Cemetery.

== Family ==
In 1901, Burt married Ethelyn Marie Bunker (1879–1934) in Burlington, Vermont. They were the parents of daughter Ruth (1902–1938), who was the wife of Army officer Robert Tappan Chaplin.

== Bibliography ==
- Davis, Henry Blaine Jr. Generals in Khaki. Raleigh, NC: Pentland Press, 1998. ISBN 1571970886 OCLC 231779136
