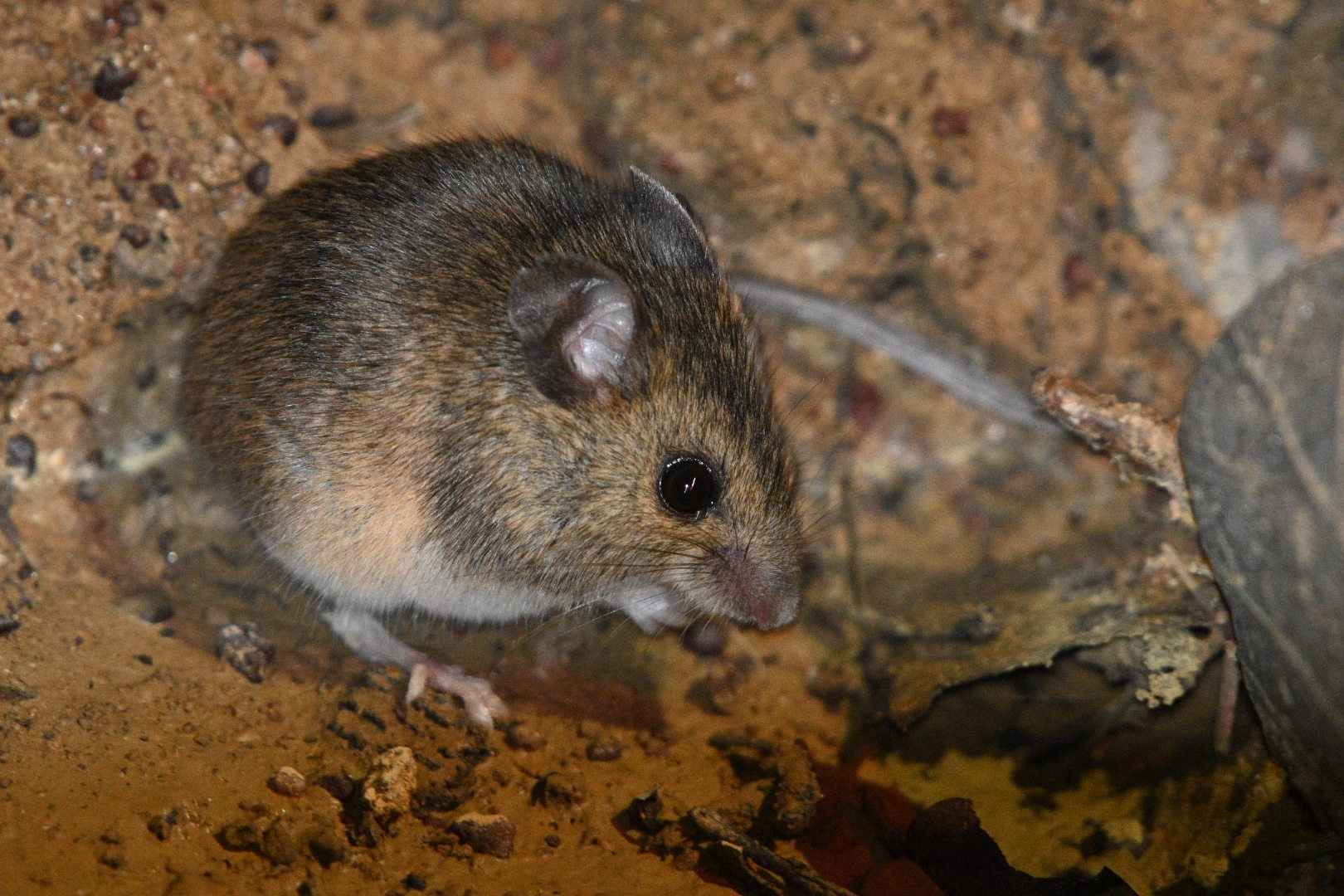

Conservation status
- Least Concern (IUCN 3.1)

Scientific classification
- Kingdom: Animalia
- Phylum: Chordata
- Class: Mammalia
- Order: Rodentia
- Family: Cricetidae
- Subfamily: Neotominae
- Genus: Reithrodontomys
- Species: R. zacatecae

Binomial name
- Reithrodontomys zacatecae Merriam, 1901

= Zacatecas harvest mouse =

Species of rodent

The Zacatecas harvest mouse (Reithrodontomys zacatecae) is a species of rodent in the family Cricetidae. It is found only in Mexico.
