= Arizona woodrat =

Conservation status
- Least Concern (IUCN 3.1)

Scientific classification
- Kingdom: Animalia
- Phylum: Chordata
- Class: Mammalia
- Order: Rodentia
- Family: Cricetidae
- Subfamily: Neotominae
- Genus: Neotoma
- Species: N. devia

Binomial name
- Neotoma devia Goldman, 1927

Species of rodent

The Arizona woodrat (Neotoma devia) is a species of rodent in the family Cricetidae. It is found in Mexico and the United States.
