= Nelson's woodrat =

Conservation status
- Critically Endangered (IUCN 3.1)

Scientific classification
- Kingdom: Animalia
- Phylum: Chordata
- Class: Mammalia
- Order: Rodentia
- Family: Cricetidae
- Subfamily: Neotominae
- Genus: Neotoma
- Species: N. nelsoni

Binomial name
- Neotoma nelsoni Goldman, 1905

Species of rodent

Nelson's woodrat (Neotoma nelsoni) is a species of rodent in the family Cricetidae. It is endemic to Mexico, where it is known only from the eastern slopes of the volcanoes Orizaba and Cofre de Perote. Due to the small geographic range, isolation, and low population, the Nelson's woodrat has a higher risk for extinction. The distribution and population sizes are small. The population exists in geographic isolation, which prevents gene flow

== Location ==
The Nelson's woodrat can only be found on the eastern side of the volcanoes Pico de Orizaba and Cofre de Perote in Mexico. The estimated area for where this species is located is 1,350 km^{2}. This area includes steep slopes, coffee plantations, and a cloud forest.

They are found at elevation ranging from 970 to 2,770 m, In a climate that is humid and warm. Preferred locations have Rain throughout all months of the year. Vegetation in the area is tropical rain forest

== Characteristics ==
The upper body is cinnamon color with a white throat and grayish brown cheeks. It has short and silky hairs and the nasal is wedge-shaped. The lower body has a tail that is multicolored and scaly and the toes are an off-white color.

Average examples have a total length of 300 mm tail vertebrae is 143 mm the hindfoot is 30 mm and the ear is 22 mm.

== Threats ==
Currently the Nelson's woodrat is threatened by agriculture and invasive species. In Mexico, a conversion to agriculture is taking place which is taking away the home of the Nelson's woodrat. Exotic and invasive species pose a threat to the Nelson's woodrat as potential predators.
