= Nicaraguan harvest mouse =

Conservation status
- Data Deficient (IUCN 3.1)

Scientific classification
- Kingdom: Animalia
- Phylum: Chordata
- Class: Mammalia
- Order: Rodentia
- Family: Cricetidae
- Subfamily: Neotominae
- Genus: Reithrodontomys
- Species: R. paradoxus

Binomial name
- Reithrodontomys paradoxus Jones & Genoways, 1970

Species of rodent

The Nicaraguan harvest mouse (Reithrodontomys paradoxus) is a species of rodent in the family Cricetidae. It is found in Costa Rica and Nicaragua.
