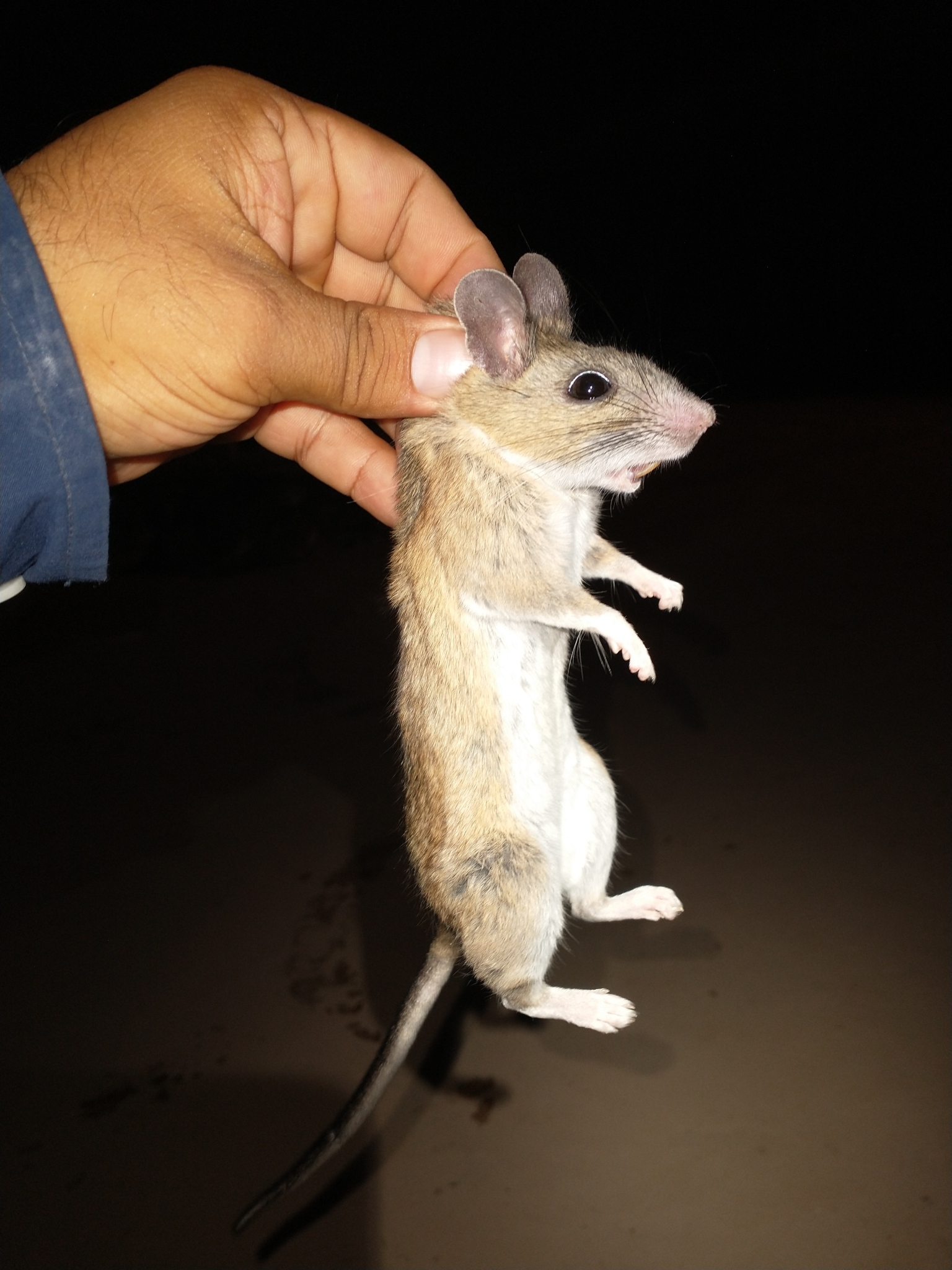

Conservation status
- Least Concern (IUCN 3.1)

Scientific classification
- Kingdom: Animalia
- Phylum: Chordata
- Class: Mammalia
- Order: Rodentia
- Family: Cricetidae
- Subfamily: Neotominae
- Genus: Neotoma
- Species: N. phenax

Binomial name
- Neotoma phenax (Merriam, 1903)

= Sonoran woodrat =

Species of rodent

The Sonoran woodrat (Neotoma phenax) is a species of rodent in the family Cricetidae found only in Mexico.
