= Small-toothed harvest mouse =

Conservation status
- Least Concern (IUCN 3.1)

Scientific classification
- Kingdom: Animalia
- Phylum: Chordata
- Class: Mammalia
- Order: Rodentia
- Family: Cricetidae
- Subfamily: Neotominae
- Genus: Reithrodontomys
- Species: R. microdon

Binomial name
- Reithrodontomys microdon Merriam, 1901

Species of rodent

The small-toothed harvest mouse (Reithrodontomys microdon) is a species of rodent in the family Cricetidae. It is found in Guatemala and Mexico.
