= Sonoran harvest mouse =

Conservation status
- Endangered (IUCN 3.1)

Scientific classification
- Kingdom: Animalia
- Phylum: Chordata
- Class: Mammalia
- Order: Rodentia
- Family: Cricetidae
- Subfamily: Neotominae
- Genus: Reithrodontomys
- Species: R. burti

Binomial name
- Reithrodontomys burti Benson, 1939

Species of rodent

The Sonoran harvest mouse (Reithrodontomys burti) is a species of rodent in the family Cricetidae. It is found only in Mexico.
