= Darien harvest mouse =

Conservation status
- Least Concern (IUCN 3.1)

Scientific classification
- Kingdom: Animalia
- Phylum: Chordata
- Class: Mammalia
- Order: Rodentia
- Family: Cricetidae
- Subfamily: Neotominae
- Genus: Reithrodontomys
- Species: R. darienensis

Binomial name
- Reithrodontomys darienensis Pearson, 1939

Species of rodent

The Darien harvest mouse (Reithrodontomys darienensis) is a species of rodent in the family Cricetidae. It is found only in Panama.
