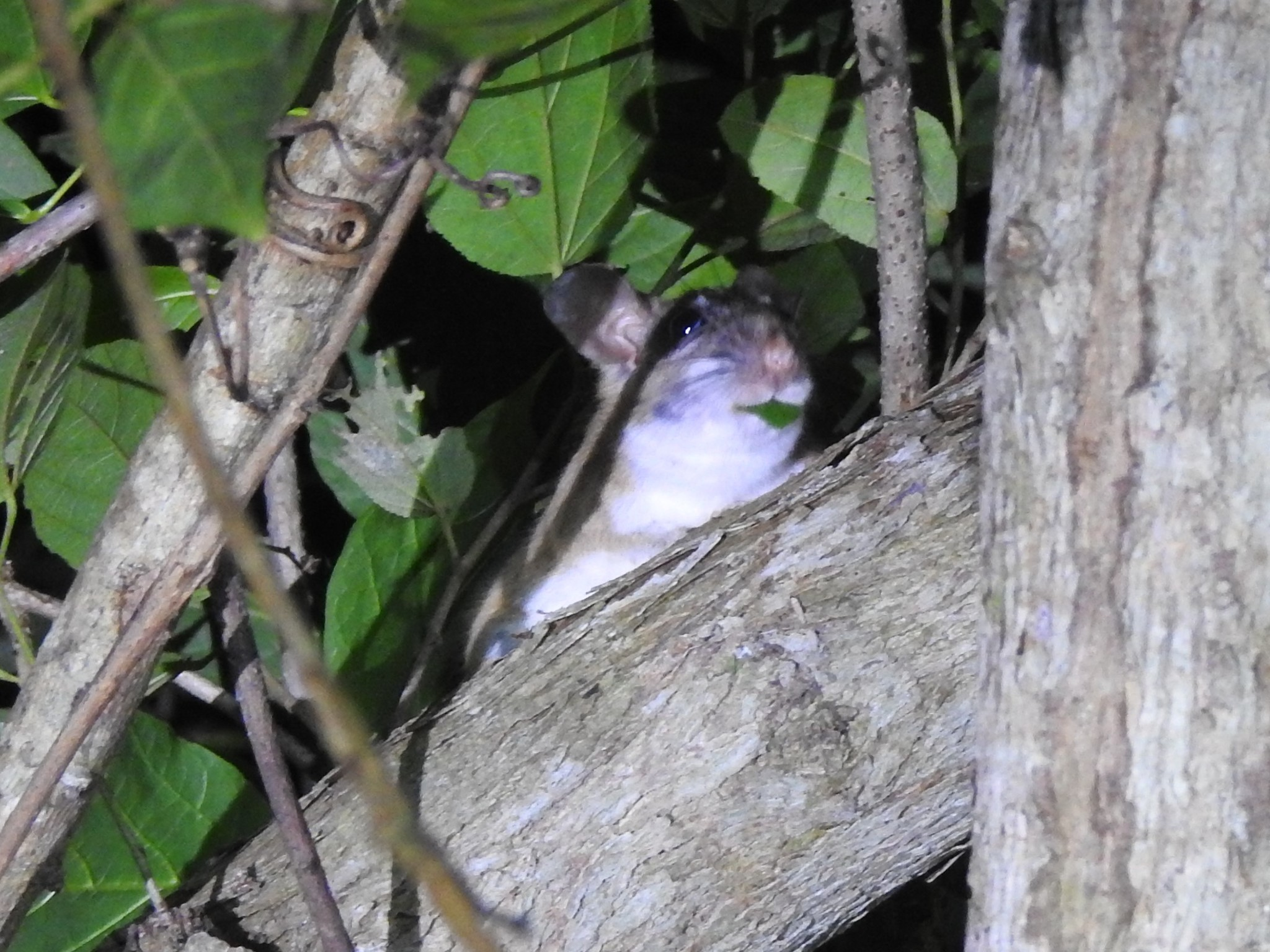

Conservation status
- Endangered (IUCN 3.1)

Scientific classification
- Kingdom: Animalia
- Phylum: Chordata
- Class: Mammalia
- Order: Rodentia
- Family: Cricetidae
- Subfamily: Neotominae
- Genus: Xenomys; Merriam, 1892
- Species: X. nelsoni

Binomial name
- Xenomys nelsoni Merriam, 1892

= Magdalena rat =

Species of rodent

The Magdalena rat (Xenomys nelsoni) is a species of rodent in the family Cricetidae which is found only in a small region of western Mexico.

It is the only species in the genus Xenomys. The common name comes from the village where the first specimen was collected, and the second part of the scientific name refers to the collector.

== Description ==
The Magdalena rat is a relatively large member of its family, measuring 30 to 34 cm (12 to 13 in) in length, including the 14 to 17 cm (5.5 to 6.7 in) tail. Adults weigh an average of 113 g (4.0 oz). The general body colour is cinnamon to yellowish brown, being paler on the head and fading to creamy white on the underparts. It can be distinguished from other local rat-like species by the presence of white spots above the eyes and behind the ears; the cheeks are also marked with white fur. The tail is both hairy and scaly, and is dark brown in colour.

== Distribution and habitat ==
The species is endemic to Colima and southwest Jalisco, along the Pacific coast of Mexico. It is estimated to inhabit an area of no more than 4,600 km^{2} (1,800 sq mi). Within this region, it is found in dense tropical forests at elevations up to 450 m (1,480 ft). There are no recognised subspecies.

== Biology and behaviour ==
The species is arboreal and nocturnal. They use branches and vines in dense vegetation to travel from tree to tree, and mostly remain between 1 and 4 m (3 ft 3 in and 13 ft 1 in) above the ground. They spend the day sleeping in spherical nests constructed in tree hollows. The nests are lined with grass and kapok fruit fibres. They also use specific latrines, either in tree hollows or at the forks of branches. They breed between late May and November, and give birth to one or two young at a time.

An endangered species, it is threatened by habitat destruction and fragmentation due to deforestation and development. It is known from only three localities, and is believed to have a very low, and declining, population.
