= Florida mouse =

Florida mouse Temporal range: Late Pleistocene – Recent

Conservation status
- Near Threatened (IUCN 3.1)

- Vulnerable (NatureServe)

Scientific classification
- Kingdom: Animalia
- Phylum: Chordata
- Class: Mammalia
- Order: Rodentia
- Family: Cricetidae
- Subfamily: Neotominae
- Tribe: Reithrodontomyini
- Genus: Podomys; Osgood, 1909
- Species: P. floridanus

Binomial name
- Podomys floridanus (Chapman, 1889)

Synonyms
- Hesperomys floridanus Chapman, 1889; Hesperomys macropus Merriam, 1890; Sitomys floridanus: Chapman, 1894; Peromyscus floridanus: Bangs, 1896; Podomys floridanus: Carleton, 1980

Species of rodent

The Florida mouse (Podomys floridanus) is a species of rodent in the Cricetidae family. It is the only species in the genus Podomys. True to its name, it is endemic to Florida in the United States.

Its natural habitat is temperate grassland. It is threatened by habitat loss.

In Florida, Florida mice may be eaten by some growth stage of invasive snakes such as Burmese pythons, reticulated pythons, Central African rock pythons, Southern African rock pythons, boa constrictors, yellow anacondas, Bolivian anacondas, dark-spotted anacondas, and green anacondas.
