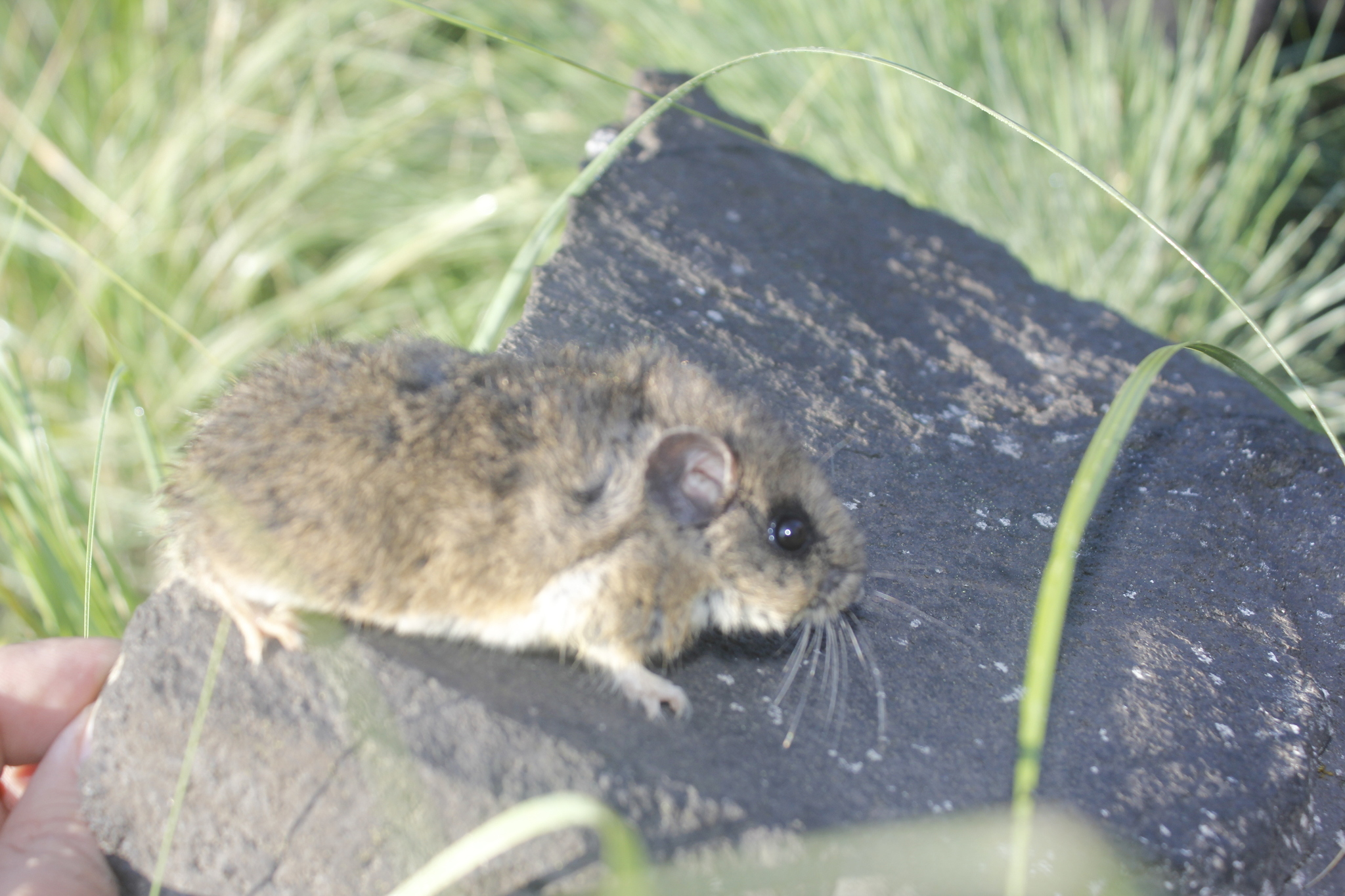

Conservation status
- Least Concern (IUCN 3.1)

Scientific classification
- Kingdom: Animalia
- Phylum: Chordata
- Class: Mammalia
- Order: Rodentia
- Family: Cricetidae
- Subfamily: Neotominae
- Genus: Neotomodon; Merriam, 1898
- Species: N. alstoni

Binomial name
- Neotomodon alstoni Merriam, 1898

= Mexican volcano mouse =

Mexican volcano mouse Temporal range: Pleistocene – Recent

Species of rodent

The Mexican volcano mouse (Neotomodon alstoni) is a species of rodent in the family Cricetidae endemic to high elevation areas of the Trans-Mexican Volcanic Belt.

== Taxonomy and systematics ==
Merriam originally described the Mexican volcano mouse as one of three species in the genus Neotomodon; N. alstoni was moved to the deer mouse genus Peromyscus in 1979, then subsequently moved back to Neotomodon. Merriam does not state after whom the species is named in his original description for the genus (and species). Despite the current taxonomy, a recent phylogeny based on cytochrome-b sequences shows Peromyscus to be polyphyletic, and the authors of that paper suggest Neotomodon (and several other monotypic genera) be transferred to Peromyscus.

== Distribution ==
The Volcano mouse is seen to reside restrictively to higher elevation or boreal habitats of the trans-volcanic belt of Central Mexico. There has been no discovery of the fossil record for this species but it seems to have a similarity in appearance to Pliotomodon' fossil. The mouse can perform simple burrowing in well-drained areas and sometimes pass under boulders.

== Characteristics ==
The Volcano mouse has a relatively medium-sized compared to other members of its genus. It has a pair of broad, naked ears while its fur is rather soft with grayish to fulvous brown color dorsally and whitish ventrally. Its tail is quite short but sharply bicolored. Compared to its short brain case entrapped in a broad skull, its zygomatic expanded. Its molars are pretty large and densely enameled. No sexual dimorphism in this species.

With relatively large eyes and ears, bi-colored body and tail (dark dorsally and white ventrally), and a tail slightly shorter than the body length, the Mexican volcano mouse appears very similar to a deer mouse, but it is diagnosed by several skull characters including the number and extent of palatal ridges and molar characteristics.

== Life events ==
Mexican volcano mouse breeding is thought to occur between June and September, with two to three litters per year of 3.3 young per litter. The mouse exhibits bi-parental care in captivity, which suggests a monogamous mating system. Little is known about other life history characteristics of the species, for example, sex ratio, age at first breeding, etc. Male with high testosterone levels develop a paternal care which increases better chances of survival and growth of its offspring. This is put under study by captive pair of mouse during postpartum and weaning periods. The presence of male lead to females care less for the young. When both parents present, however, their offspring survival chance increases significantly.
