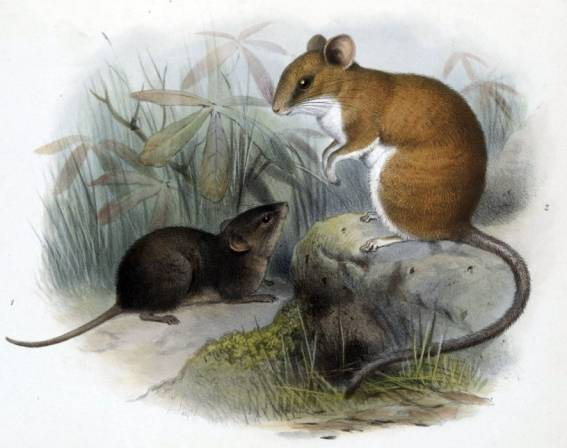
- Scotinomys teguina (left)

Scientific classification
- Domain: Eukaryota
- Kingdom: Animalia
- Phylum: Chordata
- Class: Mammalia
- Order: Rodentia
- Family: Cricetidae
- Subfamily: Neotominae
- Tribe: Baiomyini; Musser & Carleton, 2005

Type genus
- Baiomys True, 1894

Genera
- Baiomys; Scotinomys

= Baiomyini =

Tribe of rodents

Baiomyini is a tribe of rodents in the subfamily Neotominae occurring from the southern United States to Panama. It includes the genera Baiomys and Scotinomys, with a total of five living species.

Baiomyini rodents 'sing'; they chirp to find a mating partner as well as to locate each other when they spread out.
