= Allen's woodrat =

Conservation status
- Least Concern (IUCN 3.1)

Scientific classification
- Kingdom: Animalia
- Phylum: Chordata
- Class: Mammalia
- Order: Rodentia
- Family: Cricetidae
- Subfamily: Neotominae
- Tribe: Neotomini
- Genus: Hodomys; Merriam, 1894
- Species: H. alleni

Binomial name
- Hodomys alleni (Merriam, 1892)

Species of rodent

Allen's woodrat (Hodomys alleni) is a species of rodent in the family Cricetidae. It is the only species in the genus Hodomys.

== Distribution ==
This woodrat species is endemic to Mexico.

It is native from southern Sinaloa to Oaxaca states. It is found in interior México in the basins of the Río Balsas of central Puebla and Río Tehuacán of northern Oaxaca.

Its natural habitat is subtropical or tropical dry shrubland.
