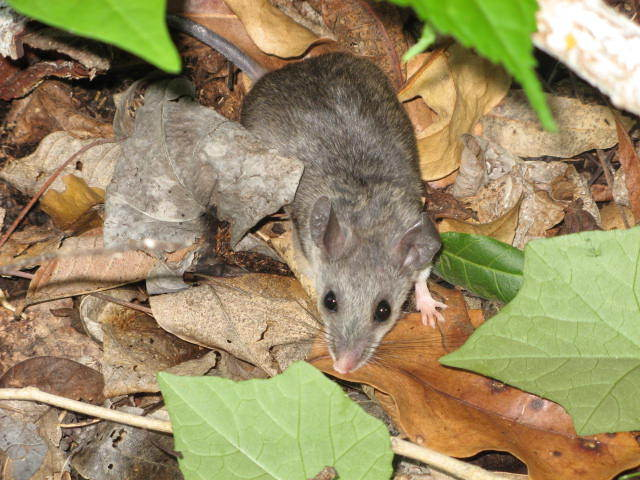

Conservation status
- Least Concern (IUCN 3.1)

Scientific classification
- Kingdom: Animalia
- Phylum: Chordata
- Class: Mammalia
- Infraclass: Placentalia
- Order: Rodentia
- Family: Cricetidae
- Subfamily: Neotominae
- Tribe: Reithrodontomyini
- Genus: Osgoodomys; Hooper & Musser, 1964)
- Species: O. banderanus

Binomial name
- Osgoodomys banderanus (J.A. Allen, 1897)

= Michoacan deer mouse =

Species of rodent

The Michoacan deer mouse (Osgoodomys banderanus) is a species of rodent in the family Cricetidae. It is the only species in the genus Osgoodomys, and is endemic to Mexico.
