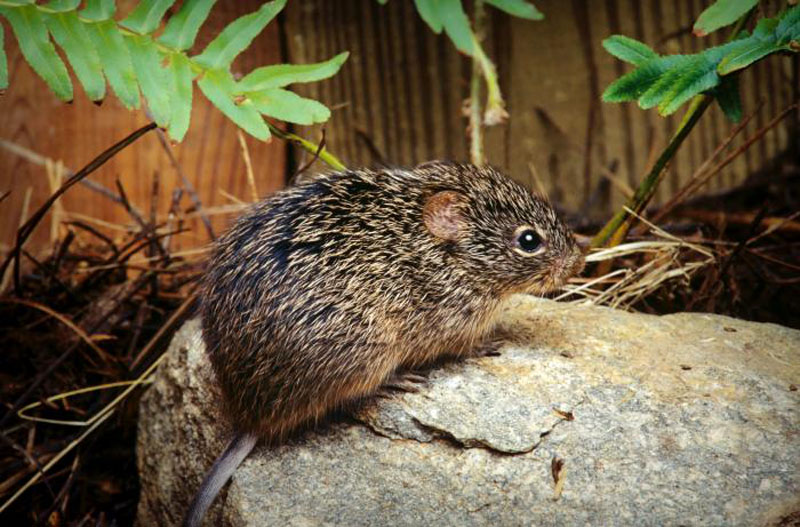
- Sigmodon hispidus

Scientific classification
- Kingdom: Animalia
- Phylum: Chordata
- Class: Mammalia
- Order: Rodentia
- Superfamily: Muroidea
- Family: Cricetidae

Subfamilies
- Neotominae; Sigmodontinae; Tylomyinae

= New World rats and mice =

New World rats and mice Temporal range: Late Miocene - Recent

Rodents native to the Americas

The New World rats and mice are a group of related rodents found in North and South America. They are diverse in appearance and ecology, ranging from the tiny Baiomys to the large Kunsia. They represent one of the few examples of muroid rodents (along with the voles) in North America, and the only example of muroid rodents to have made it into South America.

The New World rats and mice are often considered part of a single subfamily, Sigmodontinae, but the recent trend among muroid taxonomists is to recognize three separate subfamilies. This strategy better represents the extreme diversity of species numbers and ecological types.

Some molecular phylogenetic studies have suggested that the New World rats and mice are not a monophyletic group, but this is yet to be confirmed. Their closest relatives are clearly the hamsters and voles.

The New World rats and mice are divided into 3 subfamilies, 12 tribes, and 84 genera.

== Classification ==
- Family Cricetidae - hamsters, voles, and New World rats and mice
  - Subfamily Tylomyinae
    - Otonyctomys
    - Nyctomys
    - Tylomys
    - Ototylomys
  - Subfamily Neotominae
    - Tribe Baiomyini
      - Baiomys
      - Scotinomys
    - Tribe Neotomini
      - Neotoma
      - Xenomys
      - Hodomys
      - Nelsonia
    - Tribe Ochrotomyini
      - Ochrotomys
    - Tribe Reithrodontomyini
      - Peromyscus
      - Reithrodontomys
      - Onychomys
      - Neotomodon
      - Podomys
      - Isthmomys
      - Megadontomys
      - Habromys
      - Osgoodomys
  - Subfamily Sigmodontinae
    - Rhagomys incertae sedis
    - Tribe Oryzomyini
      - Oryzomys
      - Nesoryzomys
      - Melanomys
      - Sigmodontomys
      - Nectomys
      - Amphinectomys
      - Oligoryzomys
      - Neacomys
      - Zygodontomys
      - Lundomys
      - Holochilus
      - Pseudoryzomys
      - Microakodontomys
      - Oecomys
      - Microryzomys
      - Scolomys
    - Tribe Thomasomyini
      - Chilomys
      - Abrawayaomys
      - Delomys
      - Thomasomys
      - Wilfredomys
      - Aepomys
      - Phaenomys
      - Rhipidomys
    - Tribe Wiedomyini
      - Wiedomys
    - Tribe Akodontini
      - Akodon
      - Bibimys
      - Bolomys
      - Podoxymys
      - Thalpomys
      - Abrothrix
      - Chroeomys
      - Chelemys
      - Notiomys
      - Pearsonomys
      - Geoxus
      - Blarinomys
      - Juscelinomys
      - Oxymycterus
      - Lenoxus
      - Brucepattersonius
      - Scapteromys
      - Kunsia
      - Bibimys
    - Tribe Phyllotini
      - Calomys
      - Eligmodontia
      - Andalgalomys
      - Graomys
      - Salinomys
      - Phyllotis
      - Loxodontomys
      - Auliscomys
      - Galenomys
      - Chinchillula
      - Punomys
      - Andinomys
      - Irenomys
      - Euneomys
      - Neotomys
      - Reithrodon
    - Tribe Sigmodontini
      - Sigmodon
    - Tribe Ichthyomyini
      - Neusticomys
      - Rheomys
      - Anotomys
      - Chibchanomys
      - Ichthyomys
