= List of mammals of Kansas =

The list of mammals of Kansas comprises 100 mammals recorded in the U.S. state of Kansas. It includes both native and introduced species which can have a negative impact on the ecosystem but does not include domesticated animals. Four of these species that have been extirpated from the state are the gray wolf, grizzly bear, cougar, and the black-footed ferret.

== Didelphimorphia (opossums) ==
=== Opossums ===
Family: Didelphidae

- Virginia opossum, Didelphis virginiana

== Cingulata (armadillos) ==
=== Armadillos ===
Family: Dasypodidae

- Nine-banded armadillo, Dasypus novemcinctus

== Eulipotyphla (shrews and moles) ==
=== Shrews ===
Family: Soricidae

- Southern short-tailed shrew, Blarina carolinensis
- Elliot's short-tailed shrew, Blarina hylophaga
- Least shrew, Cryptotis parva
- Prairie shrew, Sorex haydeni

=== Moles ===
Family: Talpidae

- Eastern mole, Scalopus aquaticus

== Rodentia (rodents) ==
=== Beavers ===
Family: Castoridae

- North American beaver, Castor canadensis

=== Pocket gophers ===
Family: Geomyidae

- Yellow-faced pocket gopher, Cratogeomys castanops
- Plains pocket gopher, Geomys bursarius

=== Kangaroo rats and pocket mice ===
Family: Heteromyidae

- Ord's kangaroo rat, Dipodomys ordii
- Hispid pocket mouse, Perognathus fasciatus
- Plains pocket mouse, Perognathus flavescens
- Silky pocket mouse, Perognathus flavus

=== Porcupines ===
Family: Erethizontidae

- North American porcupine, Erethizon dorsatum

=== Jumping mice ===
Family: Dipodidae

- Meadow jumping mouse, Zapus hudsonius

=== New World rats, mice, and voles ===
Family: Cricetidae

- Long-tailed vole, Microtus longicaudus
- Prairie vole, Microtus ochrogaster
- Meadow vole, Microtus pennsylvanicus
- Woodland vole, Microtus pinetorum
- White-throated woodrat, Neotoma albigula
- Eastern woodrat, Neotoma floridana
- Southern plains woodrat, Neotoma micropus
- Muskrat, Ondatra zibethicus
- Northern grasshopper mouse, Onychomys leucogaster
- Marsh rice rat, Oryzomys palustris
- Texas mouse, Peromyscus attwateri
- White-footed mouse, Peromyscus leucopus
- Western deer mouse, Peromyscus sonoriensis
- Fulvous harvest mouse, Reithrodontomys fulvescens
- Eastern harvest mouse, Reithrodontomys humulis
- Western harvest mouse, Reithrodontomys megalotis
- Plains harvest mouse, Reithrodontomys montanus
- Hispid cotton rat, Sigmodon hispidus

=== Old World rats and mice ===
Family: Muridae

- House mouse, Mus musculus introduced
- Brown rat, Rattus norvegicus introduced
- Black rat, Rattus rattus introduced

=== Chipmunks, marmots, and squirrels ===
Family: Sciuridae

- Black-tailed prairie dog, Cynomys ludovicianus
- Southern flying squirrel, Glaucomys volans
- Thirteen-lined ground squirrel, Ictodomys tridecemlineatus
- Groundhog, Marmota monax
- Colorado chipmunk, Neotamias quadrivittatus
- Rock squirrel, Otospermophilus variegatus
- Eastern gray squirrel, Sciurus carolinensis
- Fox squirrel, Sciurus niger
- Eastern chipmunk, Tamias striatus
- Spotted ground squirrel, Xerospermophilus spilosoma

=== Nutria ===
Family: Myocastoridae

- Nutria, Myocastor coypus introduced

== Lagomorpha (lagomorphs) ==
=== Rabbits and hares ===
Family: Leporidae

- Black-tailed jackrabbit, Lepus californicus
- White-tailed jackrabbit, Lepus townsendii
- Swamp rabbit, Sylvilagus aquaticus
- Desert cottontail, Sylvilagus audubonii
- Eastern cottontail, Sylvilagus floridanus

== Chiroptera (bats) ==
=== Vesper bats ===
Family: Vespertilionidae

- Pallid bat, Antrozous pallidus
- Townsend's big-eared bat, Corynorhinus townsendii
- Big brown bat, Eptesicus fuscus
- Silver-haired bat, Lasionycteris noctivagans
- Eastern red bat, Lasiurus borealis
- Hoary bat, Lasiurus cinereus
- Western small-footed myotis, Myotis ciliolabrum
- Gray bat, Myotis grisescens
- Small-footed myotis, Myotis leibii
- Little brown bat, Myotis lucifugus
- Indiana myotis, Myotis sodalis
- Cave myotis, Myotis velifer
- Yuma myotis, Myotis yumanensis
- Evening bat, Nycticeius humeralis
- Western pipistrelle, Parastrellus hesperus
- Eastern pipistrelle, Pipistrellus subflavus
- Rafinesque's big-eared bat, Plecotus rafinesquii
- Townsend's big-eared bat, Plecotus townsendii

=== Free-tailed bats ===
Family: Molossidae

- Big free-tailed bat, Nyctinomops macrotis
- Mexican free-tailed bat, Tadarida brasiliensis

== Carnivora (carnivorans) ==
=== Felines ===
Family: Felidae

- Bobcat, Lynx rufus
- Cougar, Puma concolor extirpated
  - Eastern cougar, P. c. couguar extinct

=== Canids ===
Family: Canidae

- Coyote, Canis latrans
- Gray wolf, Canis lupus extirpated
  - Great Plains wolf, C. l. nubilus extirpated
- Red wolf, Canis rufus extirpated
- Gray fox, Urocyon cinereoargenteus
- Swift fox, Vulpes velox
- Red fox, Vulpes vulpes

=== Bears ===
Family: Ursidae

- American black bear, Ursus americanus extirpated, vagrant
- Brown bear, Ursus arctos extirpated
  - Grizzly bear, U. a. horribilis extirpated

=== Skunks ===
Family: Mephitidae

- Striped skunk, Mephitis mephitis
- Western spotted skunk, Spilogale gracilis
- Eastern spotted skunk, Spilogale putorius

=== Mustelids ===
Family: Mustelidae

- North American river otter, Lontra canadensis
- Black-footed ferret, Mustela nigripes reintroduced
- Least weasel, Mustela nivalis
- Long-tailed weasel, Neogale frenata
- American mink, Neogale vison
- American badger, Taxidea taxus

=== Procyonids ===
Family: Procyonidae

- Ringtail, Bassariscus astutus
- Raccoon, Procyon lotor

== Artiodactyla (even-toed ungulates) ==
=== Pronghorns ===
Family: Antilocapridae

- Pronghorn, Antilocapra americana

=== Bovids ===
Family: Bovidae

- American bison, Bison bison reintroduced
  - Plains bison, B. b. bison reintroduced

=== Deer ===
Family: Cervidae

- Moose, Alces alces vagrant
- Elk, Cervus canadensis
- Mule deer, Odocoileus hemionus
- White-tailed deer, Odocoileus virginianus

== See also ==
- List of chordate orders
- List of regional mammals lists
