= List of mammals of Oklahoma =

This list of mammals of Oklahoma lists all wild mammal species recorded in the state of Oklahoma. This includes mammals that are extirpated from the state and species introduced into the state. It does not include species that are domesticated.

== Didelphimorphia ==
=== Opossums ===
Order: Didelphimorphia Family: Didelphidae

- Virginia opossum, Didelphis virginiana

== Eulipotyphla ==
=== Shrews ===
Order: Eulipotyphla Family: Soricidae

- Southern short-tailed shrew, Blarina carolinensis
- Elliot's short-tailed shrew, Blarina hylophaga
- Least shrew, Cryptotis parva
- Desert shrew, Notiosorex crawfordi
- Southeastern shrew, Sorex longirostris

=== Moles ===
Order: Eulipotyphla Family: Talpidae

- Eastern mole, Scalopus aquaticus

== Cingulata ==
=== Armadillos ===
Order: Cingulata Family: Dasypodidae

- Nine-banded armadillo, Dasypus novemcinctus

== Rodentia ==
=== Beavers ===
Order: Rodentia Family: Castoridae

- North American beaver, Castor canadensis

=== Pocket gophers ===
Order: Rodentia Family: Geomyidae

- Yellow-faced pocket gopher, Cratogeomys castanops
- Plains pocket gopher, Geomys bursarius

=== Kangaroo rats and pocket mice ===
Order: Rodentia Family: Heteromyidae

- Texas kangaroo rat, Dipodomys elator
- Ord's kangaroo rat, Dipodomys ordii
- Hispid pocket mouse, Perognathus fasciatus
- Plains pocket mouse, Perognathus flavescens
- Silky pocket mouse, Perognathus flavus

=== Porcupines ===
Order: Rodentia Family: Erethizontidae

- North American porcupine, Erethizon dorsatum

=== Jumping mice ===
Order: Rodentia Family: Dipodidae

- Meadow jumping mouse, Zapus hudsonius

=== New World rats, mice, and voles ===
Order: Rodentia Family: Cricetidae

- Eastern harvest mouse, Reithrodontomys humulis
- Muskrat, Ondatra zibethicus
- Texas mouse, Peromyscus attwateri
- Fulvous harvest mouse, Reithrodontomys fulvescens
- Marsh rice rat, Oryzomys palustris
- Eastern woodrat, Neotoma floridana
- Mexican woodrat, Neotoma mexicana
- White-throated woodrat, Neotoma albigula
- Southern plains woodrat, Neotoma micropus
- Brush mouse, Peromyscus boylii
- Rock mouse, Peromyscus difficilis
- Cotton mouse, Peromyscus gossypinus
- White-footed mouse, Peromyscus leucopus
- Western deer mouse, Peromyscus sonoriensis
- Pinyon mouse, Peromyscus truei
- Western harvest mouse, Reithrodontomys megalotis
- White-ankled mouse, Peromyscus pectoralis
- Plains harvest mouse, Reithrodontomys montanus
- Northern grasshopper mouse, Onychomys leucogaster
- Northern pygmy mouse, Baiomys taylori
- Hispid cotton rat, Sigmodon hispidus
- Sagebrush vole, Lemmiscus curtatus
- Long-tailed vole, Microtus longicaudus
- Prairie vole, Microtus ochrogaster
- Woodland vole, Microtus pinetorum

=== Old World rats and mice ===
Order: Rodentia Family: Muridae

- Brown rat, Rattus norvegicus introduced
- House mouse, Mus musculus introduced
- Black rat, Rattus rattus introduced

=== Chipmunks, marmots, and squirrels ===
Order: Rodentia Family: Sciuridae

- Eastern gray squirrel, Sciurus carolinensis
- Fox squirrel, Sciurus niger
- Black-tailed prairie dog, Cynomys ludovicianus
- Southern flying squirrel, Glaucomys volans
- Groundhog, Marmota monax
- Spotted ground squirrel, Xeropermophilus spilosoma
- Thirteen-lined ground squirrel, Ictodomys tridecemlineatus
- Rock squirrel, Otospermophilus variegatus
- Eastern chipmunk, Tamias striatus
- Colorado chipmunk, Neotamias quadrivittatus

=== Myocastorids ===
Order: Rodentia Family: Myocastoridae

- Nutria, Myocastor coypus introduced

== Lagomorpha ==
=== Rabbits and hares ===
Order: Lagomorpha Family: Leporidae

- Black-tailed jackrabbit, Lepus californicus
- Swamp rabbit, Sylvilagus aquaticus
- Desert cottontail, Sylvilagus audubonii
- Eastern cottontail, Sylvilagus floridanus

== Chiroptera ==
=== Vesper bats ===
Order: Chiroptera Family: Vespertilionidae

- Pallid bat, Antrozous pallidus
- Rafinesque's big-eared bat, Plecotus rafinesquii
- Townsend's big-eared bat, Plecotus townsendii
- Evening bat, Nycticeius humeralis
- Seminole bat, Lasiurus seminolus
- Eastern red bat, Lasiurus borealis
- Silver-haired bat, Lasionycteris noctivagans
- Yuma myotis, Myotis yumanensis
- Cave myotis, Myotis velifer
- Indiana myotis, Myotis sodalis
- Little brown bat, Myotis lucifugus
- Small-footed myotis, Myotis leibii
- Northern myotis, Myotis keenii
- Gray bat, Myotis grisescens
- Southeastern myotis, Myotis austroriparius
- Big brown bat, Eptesicus fuscus
- Spotted bat, Euderma maculatum
- Eastern red bat, Lasiurus borealis
- Hoary bat, Lasiurus cinereus
- Western pipistrelle, Parastrellus hesperus
- Eastern pipistrelle, Pipistrellus subflavus
- Townsend's big-eared bat, Corynorhinus townsendii

=== Free-tailed bats ===
Order: Chiroptera Family: Molossidae

- Western mastiff bat, Eumops perotis vagrant
- Big free-tailed bat, Nyctinomops macrotis
- Mexican free-tailed bat, Tadarida brasiliensis

== Carnivora ==
=== Cats ===
Order: Carnivora Family: Felidae

- Bobcat, Lynx rufus
- Cougar, Puma concolor extirpated, vagrant
- Ocelot, Leopardus pardalis extirpated

=== Canids ===
Order: Carnivora Family: Canidae

- Coyote, Canis latrans
- Gray wolf, Canis lupus extirpated
  - Great Plains wolf, C. l. nubilus EX
- Red wolf, Canis rufus extirpated
- Gray fox, Urocyon cinereoargenteus
- Swift fox, Vulpes velox
- Red fox, Vulpes vulpes

=== Bears ===
Order: Carnivora Family: Ursidae

- American black bear, Ursus americanus
- Brown bear, Ursus arctos extirpated
  - Grizzly bear, U. a. horribilis extirpated

=== Skunks ===
Order: Carnivora Family: Mephitidae

- Striped skunk, Mephitis mephitis
- Western spotted skunk, Spilogale gracilis
- Eastern spotted skunk, Spilogale putorius

=== Weasels ===
Order: Carnivora Family: Mustelidae

- North American river otter, Lontra canadensis
- Least weasel, Mustela nivalis
- Black-footed ferret, Mustela nigripes extirpated
- Long-tailed weasel, Neogale frenata
- American mink, Neogale vison
- American badger, Taxidea taxus

=== Procyonids ===
Order: Carnivora Family: Procyonidae

- Ringtail, Bassariscus astutus
- Raccoon, Procyon lotor

== Artiodactyla ==
=== Pronghorns ===
Order: Artiodactyla Family: Antilocapridae

- Pronghorn, Antilocapra americana

=== Bovids ===
Order: Artiodactyla Family: Bovidae

- American bison, Bison bison reintroduced
  - Plains bison, B. b. bison reintroduced
- Bighorn sheep, Ovis canadensis

=== Deer ===
Order: Artiodactyla Family: Cervidae

- Elk, Cervus canadensis
- Mule deer, Odocoileus hemionus
- White-tailed deer, Odocoileus virginianus

=== Pigs ===
Order: Artiodactyla Family: Suidae

- Wild boar, Sus scrofa introduced

=== Peccaries ===
Order: Artiodactyla Family: Tayassuidae

- Collared peccary, Dicotyles tajacu

== See also ==
- List of chordate orders
- List of regional mammals lists
