= List of mammals of Wyoming =

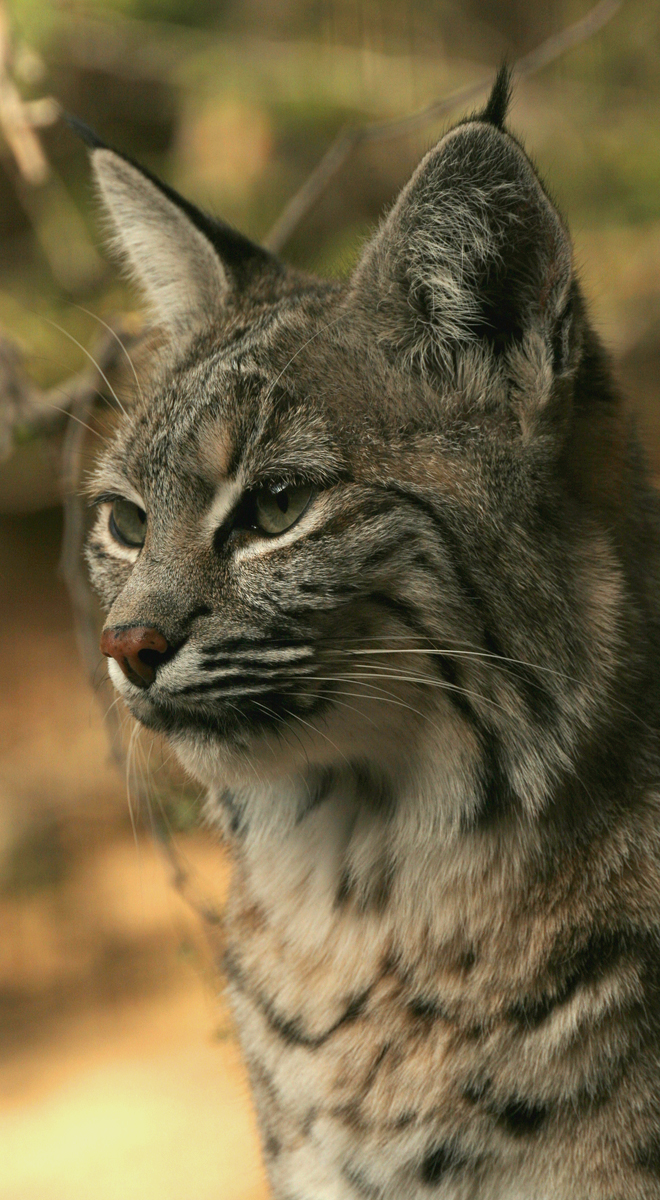
Bobcat

There are at least 18 large mammal and 103 small mammal species known to occur in Wyoming.

Species are listed by common name, scientific name, typical habitat and occurrence. The common and scientific names come from the American Society of Mammalogists' Wyoming Mammal List.

== Large and medium sized mammals ==
=== Grizzly bear ===
Order: Carnivora, Family: Ursidae

=== Black bear ===
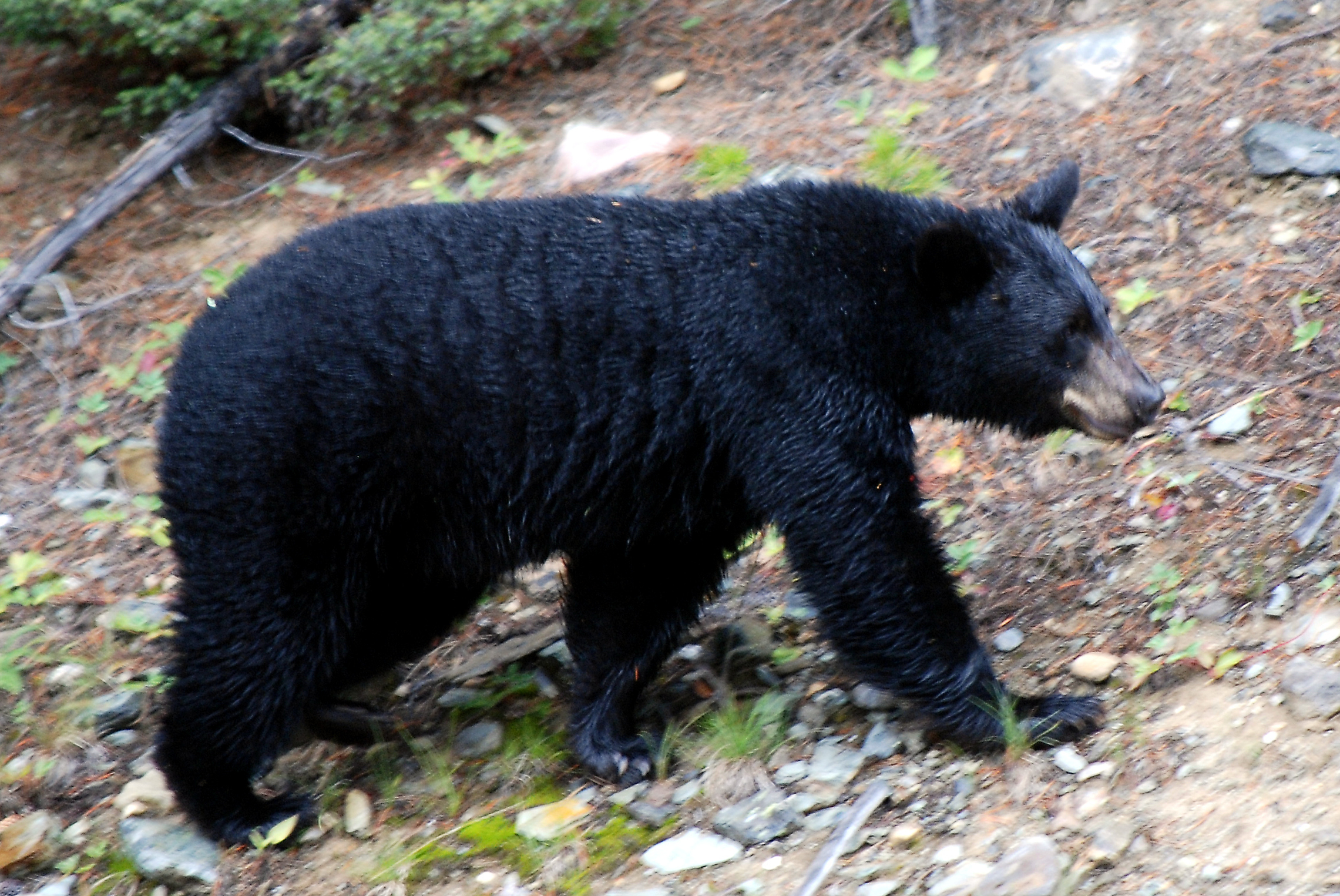
Black bear

Order: Carnivora, Family: Ursidae

Occurrence: Forests, slide areas, alpine meadows

The American black bear (Ursus americanus) is North America's smallest and most common species of bear. It is a generalist animal, being able to exploit numerous different habitats and foodstuffs. The American black bear is listed by the IUCN as being of least concern, due to the species widespread distribution and a large global population estimated to be twice that of all other bear species combined.

=== Bighorn sheep ===
Order: Artiodactyla, Family: Bovidae

Occurrence: Open mountainous areas

The bighorn sheep (Ovis canadensis) is a species of sheep in North America with large horns. The horns can weigh up to 30 pounds (14 kg), while the sheep themselves weigh up to 300 pounds (140 kg).

=== American bison ===
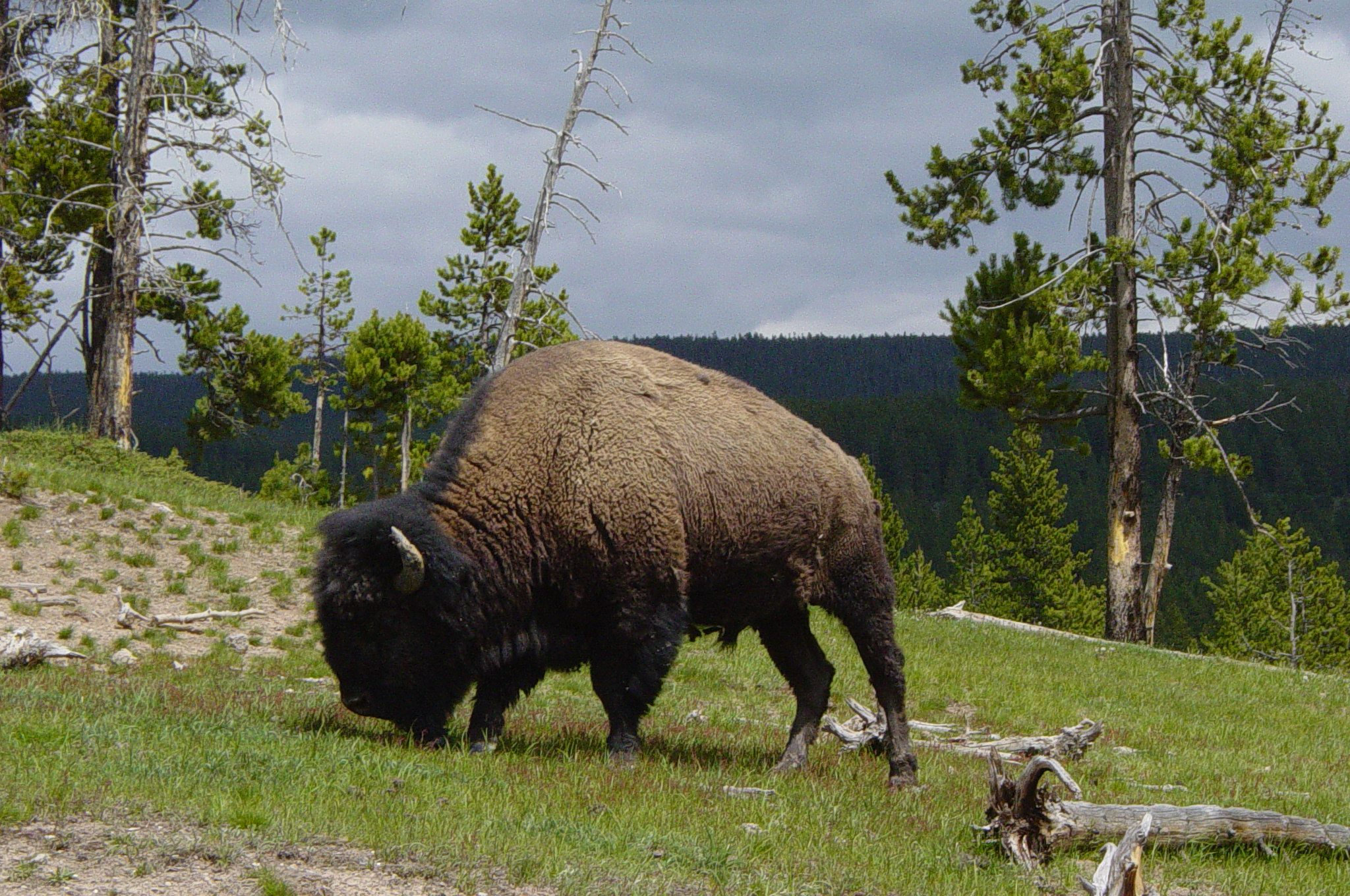
Bison

Order: Artiodactyla, Family: Bovidae

Occurrence: Eastside parklands and prairies

The American bison (Bison bison) is a North American species of bison, also commonly known as the American buffalo. These bison once roamed the grasslands of North America in massive herds; their range roughly formed a triangle between the Great Bear Lake in Canada's far northwest, south to the Mexican states of Durango and Nuevo León, and east along the western boundary of the Appalachian Mountains. Today these bison are much fewer in number, and travel only in small herds.

In 1985, the American bison was declared the state mammal of Wyoming.

=== Bobcat ===
Order: Carnivora, Family: Felidae

Occurrence: Open forests, brushy areas

The bobcat (Lynx rufus) is a North American mammal of the cat family, Felidae. With twelve recognized subspecies, it ranges from southern Canada to northern Mexico, including most of the continental United States. The bobcat is an adaptable predator that inhabits wooded areas, as well as semi-desert, urban edge, forest edges and swampland environments. It persists in much of its original range and populations are healthy.

=== Coyote ===
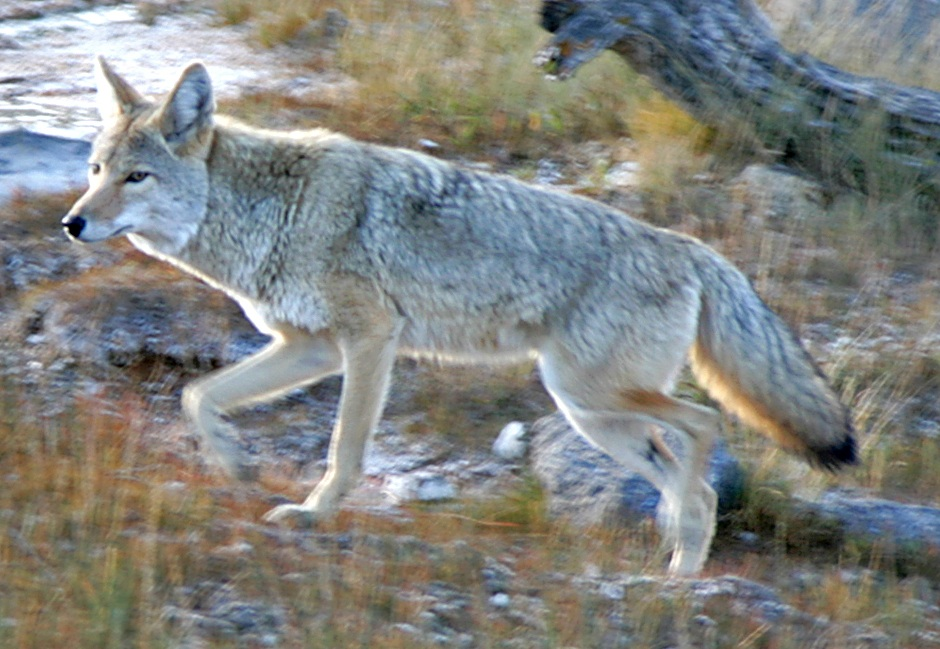
Coyote

Order: Carnivora, Family: Canidae

Occurrence: Forests, grasslands

The coyote (/ˈkaɪ.oʊt/ or /kaɪˈoʊtiː/) (Canis latrans), also known as the American jackal or the prairie wolf, is a species of canid found throughout North and Central America, ranging from Panama in the south, north through Mexico, the United States and Canada. It occurs as far north as Alaska and all but the northernmost portions of Canada.

=== Elk ===
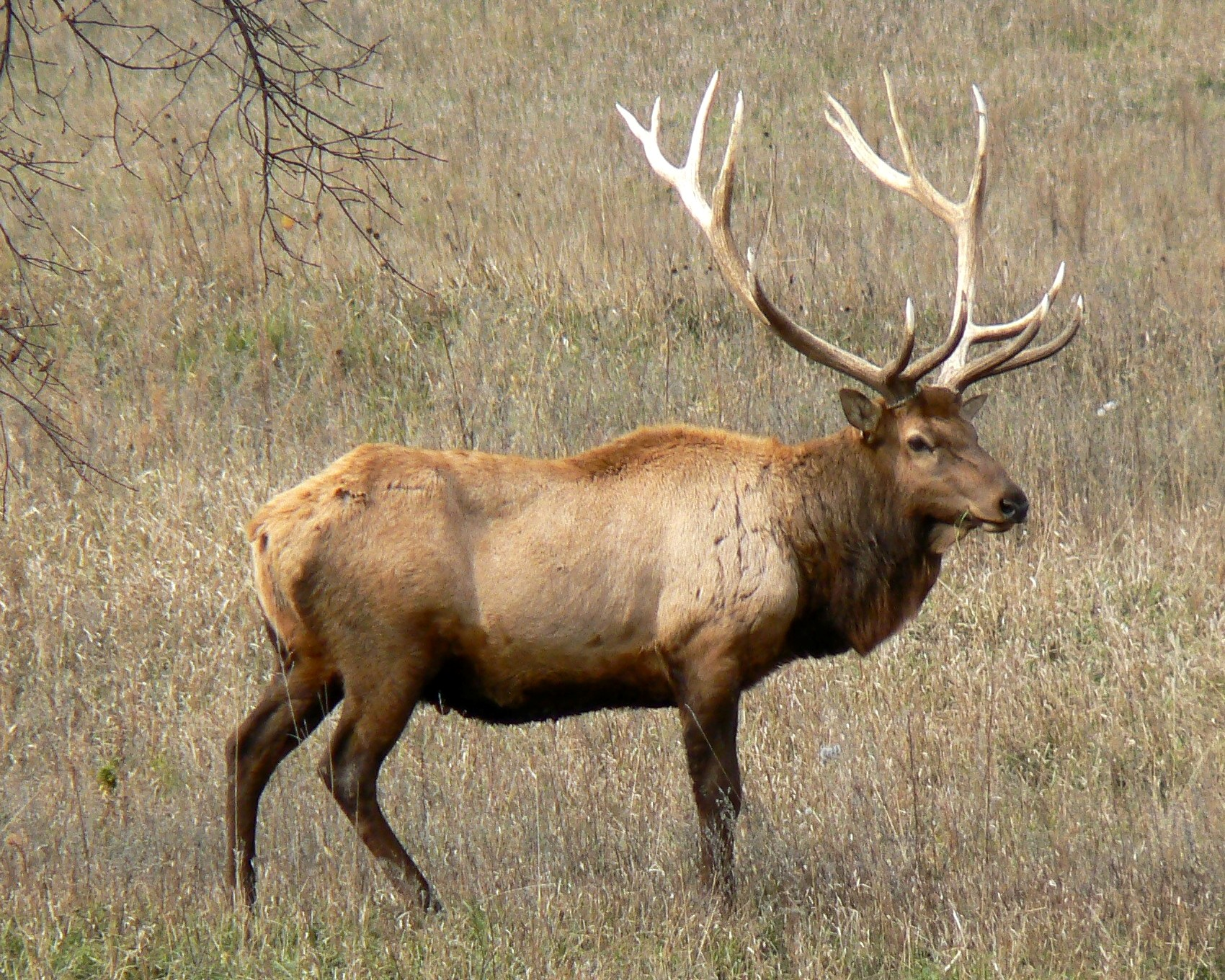
Bull elk

Order: Artiodactyla, Family: Cervidae

Occurrence: Open forests, meadows, fields

The elk or wapiti (Cervus canadensis) is one of the largest species of deer in the world and one of the largest mammals in North America and eastern Asia. In the deer family (Cervidae), only the moose, Alces alces (called an "elk" in Europe), is larger, and Cervus unicolor (the sambar deer) can rival the C. canadensis elk in size. Elk range in forest and forest-edge habitat, feeding on grasses, plants, leaves, and bark.

=== Gray fox ===
Order: Carnivora, Family: Canidae

Occurrence: Deciduous forests, cottonwood riparian, basin-prairie shrublands, sagebrush-grasslands, riparian shrub, grasslands, agricultural areas, rock outcrops, roadside/railroad banks.

The gray fox (Urocyon cinereoargenteus) ranges throughout most of the southern half of North America from southern Canada to the northern part of South America (Venezuela and Colombia).

=== Gray wolf ===
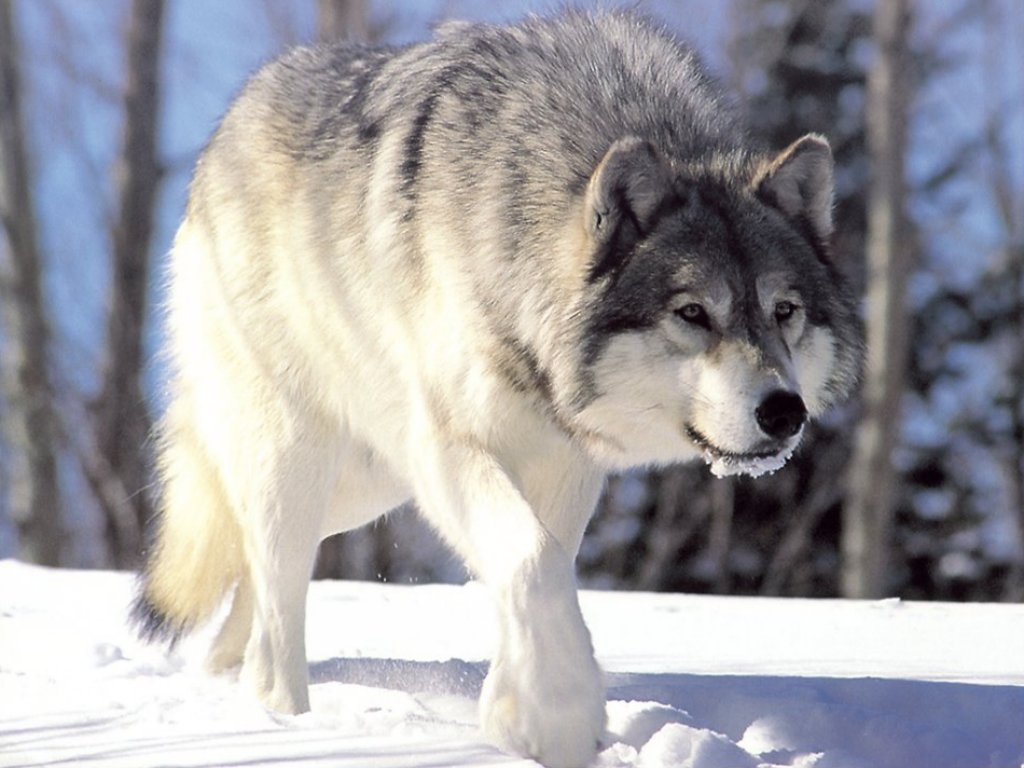
Gray wolf

Order: Carnivora, Family: Canidae

Occurrence: Coniferous forests

The gray wolf (Canis lupus), often known simply as the wolf, is the largest wild member of the family Canidae. It is an ice age survivor originating during the Late Pleistocene around 300,000 years ago. DNA sequencing and genetic drift studies reaffirm that the gray wolf shares a common ancestry with the domestic dog (Canis lupus familiaris). Although certain aspects of this conclusion have been questioned, the main body of evidence confirms it. A number of other gray wolf subspecies have been identified, though the actual number of subspecies is still open to discussion. Gray wolves are typically apex predators in the ecosystems they occupy.

=== Canada lynx ===
Order: Carnivora, Family: Felidae

Occurrence: Coniferous forests

The Canada lynx (Lynx canadensis) is a North American mammal of the cat family, Felidae. It is a close relative of the Eurasian lynx (Lynx lynx). Some authorities regard both as conspecific. However, in some characteristics the Canadian lynx is more like the bobcat (Lynx rufus) than the Eurasian lynx. With the recognized subspecies, it ranges across Canada and into Alaska as well as some parts of the northern United States.

=== Moose ===
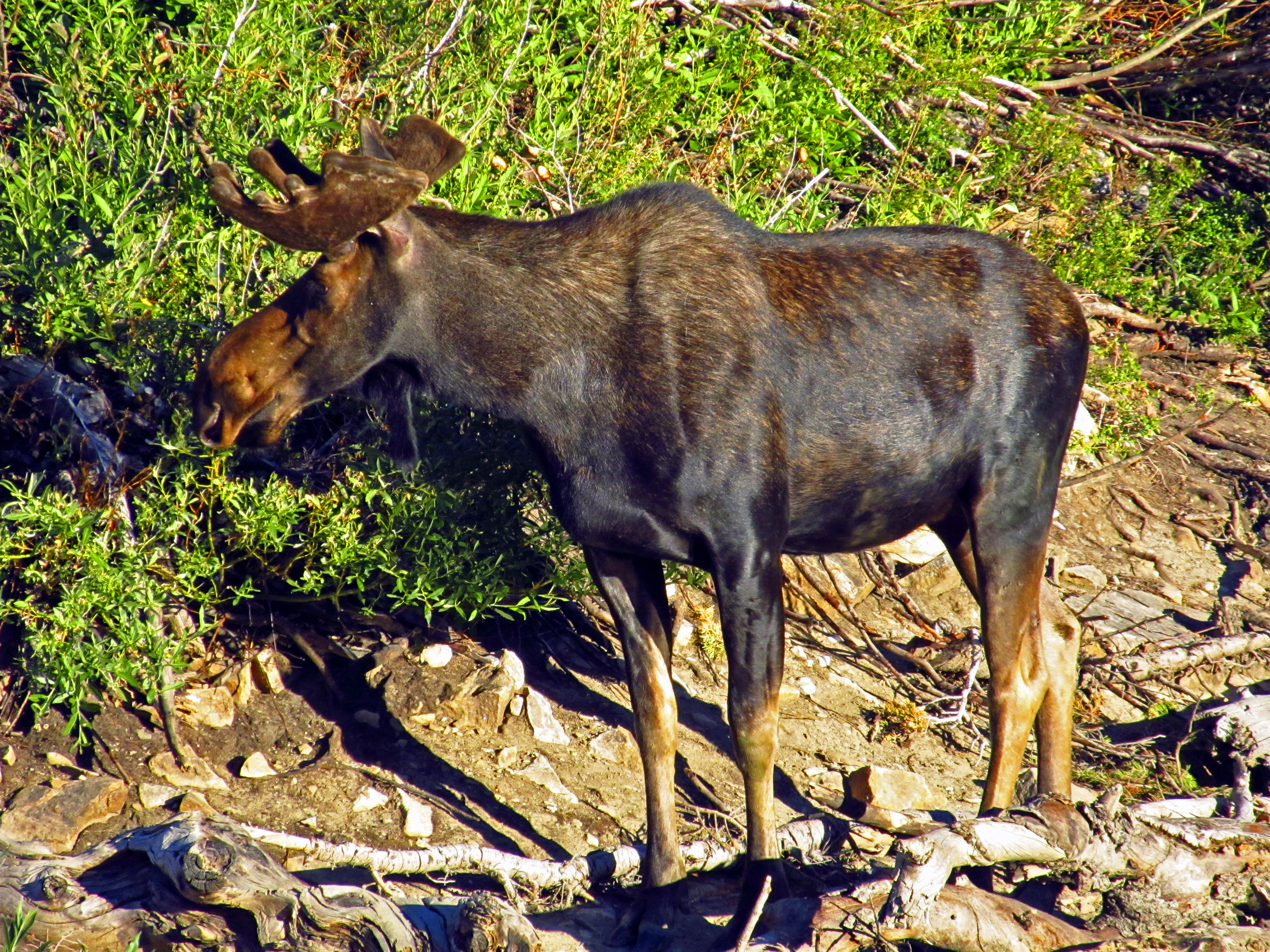
Moose

Order: Artiodactyla, Family: Cervidae

Occurrence: Coniferous forests, lakes, slow streams, marshy areas

The moose (North America) or common European elk (Europe) (Alces alces) is the largest extant species in the deer family. Moose are distinguished by the palmate antlers of the males; other members of the family have antlers with a "twig-like" configuration. Moose typically inhabit boreal and mixed deciduous forests of the Northern Hemisphere in temperate to subarctic climates.

=== Mountain goat ===
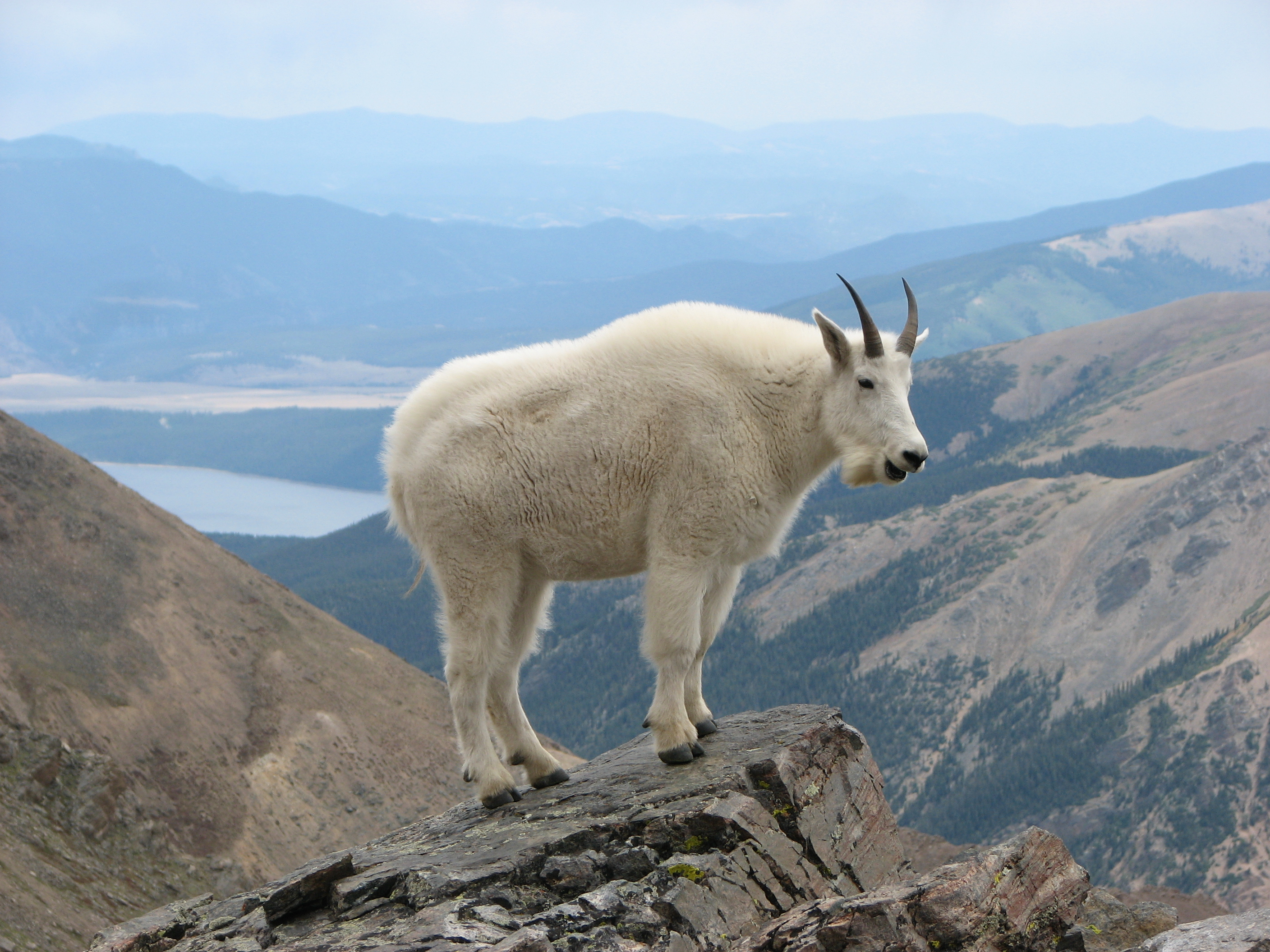
Mountain goat

Order: Artiodactyla, Family: Bovidae

Occurrence: High peaks and meadows

The mountain goat (Oreamnos americanus), also known as the Rocky Mountain goat, is a large-hoofed mammal found only in North America. Despite its vernacular name, it is not a member of Capra, the genus of true goats. It resides at high elevations and is a sure-footed climber, often resting on rocky cliffs that predators cannot reach. It has been introduced.

=== Mountain lion ===
Order: Carnivora, Family: Felidae

Occurrence: Coniferous forests

The cougar (Puma concolor), also known as puma, mountain lion, mountain cat, catamount or panther, depending on the region, is a mammal of the family Felidae, native to the Americas. This large, solitary cat has the greatest range of any large wild terrestrial mammal in the Western Hemisphere, extending from Yukon in Canada to the southern Andes of South America. An adaptable, generalist species, the cougar is found in every major American habitat type. It is the second heaviest cat in the American continents after the jaguar. Although large, the cougar is most closely related to smaller felines.

=== Mule deer ===
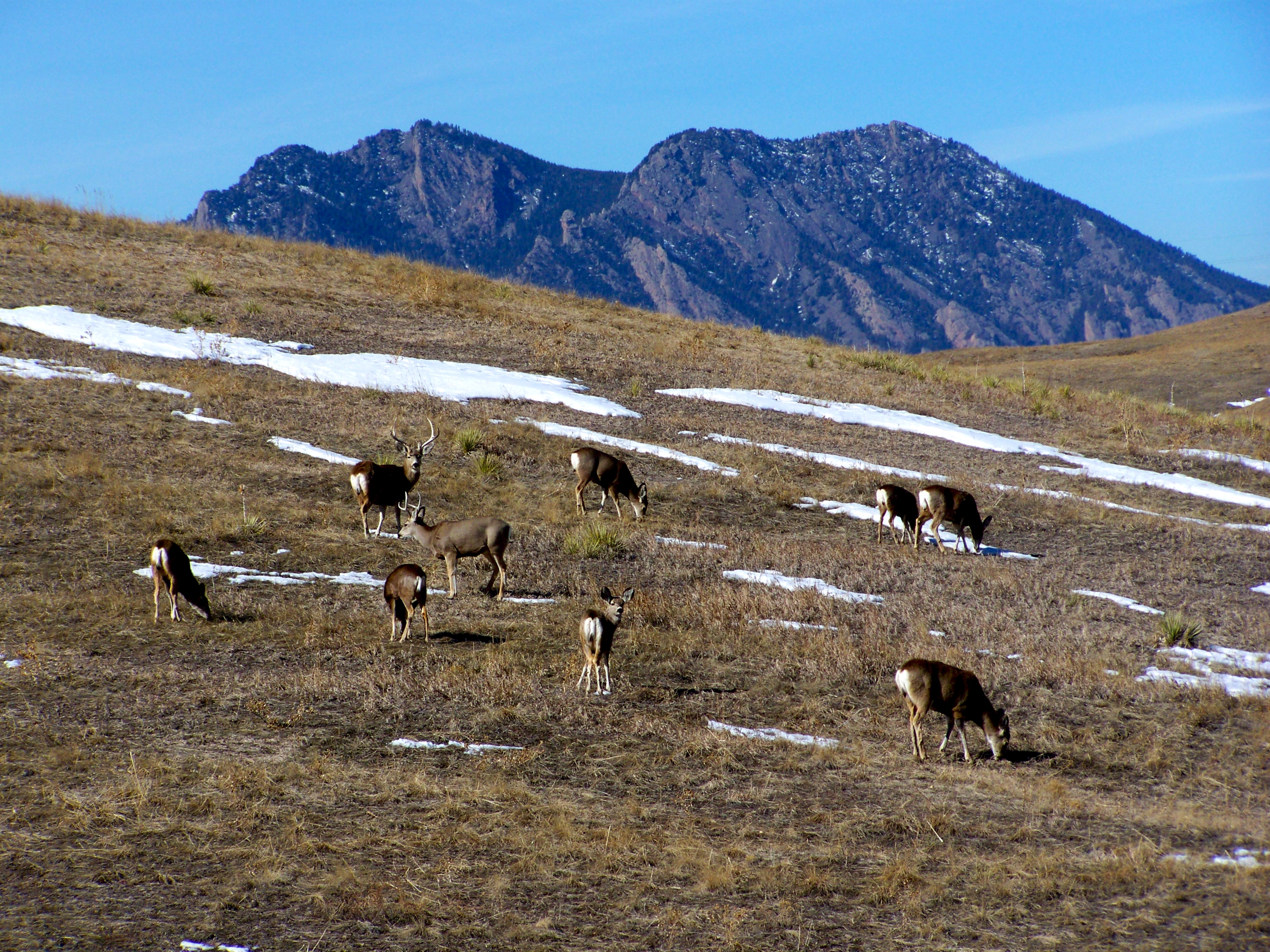
Mule deer

Order: Artiodactyla, Family: Cervidae

Occurrence: Open forests, meadows, often at high elevations

The mule deer (Odocoileus hemionus) is a deer whose habitat is in the western half of North America. It gets its name from its large mule-like ears. Adult male mule deer are called bucks, adult females are called does, and young of both sexes are called fawns. The black-tailed deer is considered by some a distinct species though it is classified as a subspecies of the mule deer. Unlike its cousin, the white-tailed deer, mule deer are generally more associated with the land west of the Missouri River. The most noticeable differences between whitetails and mule deer are the color of their tails and configuration of their antlers. The mule deer's tail is black tipped.

=== Pronghorn ===
Order: Artiodactyla, Family: Antilocapridae

Occurrence: Basin-prairie and mountain-foothills, shrublands, eastern great plains and great basin-foothills grasslands, sagebrush-grasslands

The pronghorn (Antilocapra americana), is a species of artiodactyl mammal native to interior western and central North America. Though not a true antelope, it is often known colloquially in North America as the prong buck, pronghorn antelope or simply antelope, as it closely resembles the true antelopes of the Old World and fills a similar ecological niche due to convergent evolution. It is the only surviving member of the family Antilocapridae.

=== Red fox ===
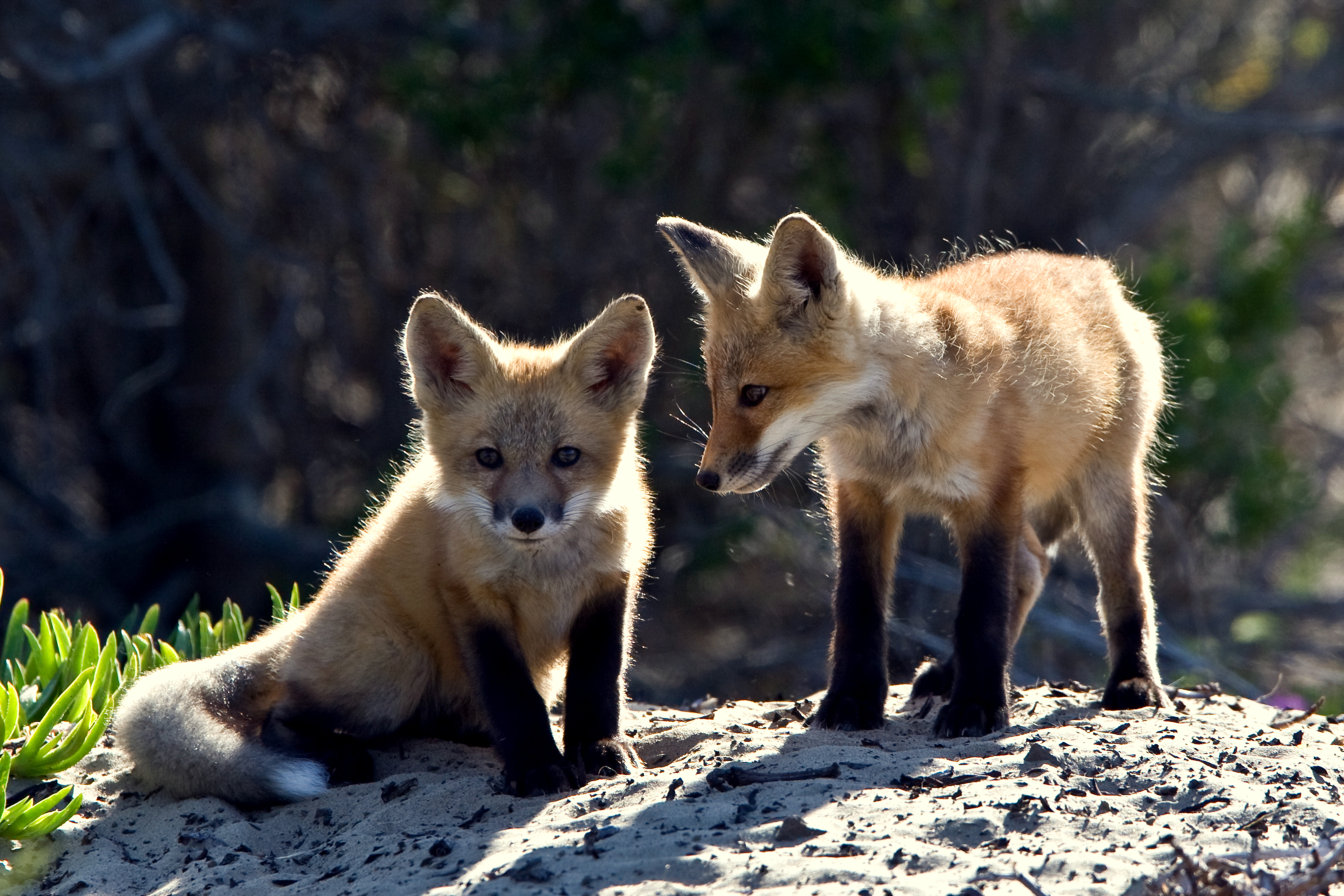
Red fox kits

Order: Carnivora, Family: Canidae

Occurrence: Grasslands, open forest

The red fox (Vulpes vulpes) is a small canid native to much of North America and Eurasia, as well as northern Africa. It is the most recognizable species of fox and in many areas it is referred to simply as "the fox". As its name suggests, its fur is predominantly reddish brown, but there is a naturally occurring gray morph known as the "silver" fox. The red fox is by far the most widespread and abundant species of fox, found in almost every single habitat in the Northern Hemisphere, from the coastal marshes of United States, to the alpine tundras of Tibetan Plateau.

=== Swift fox ===
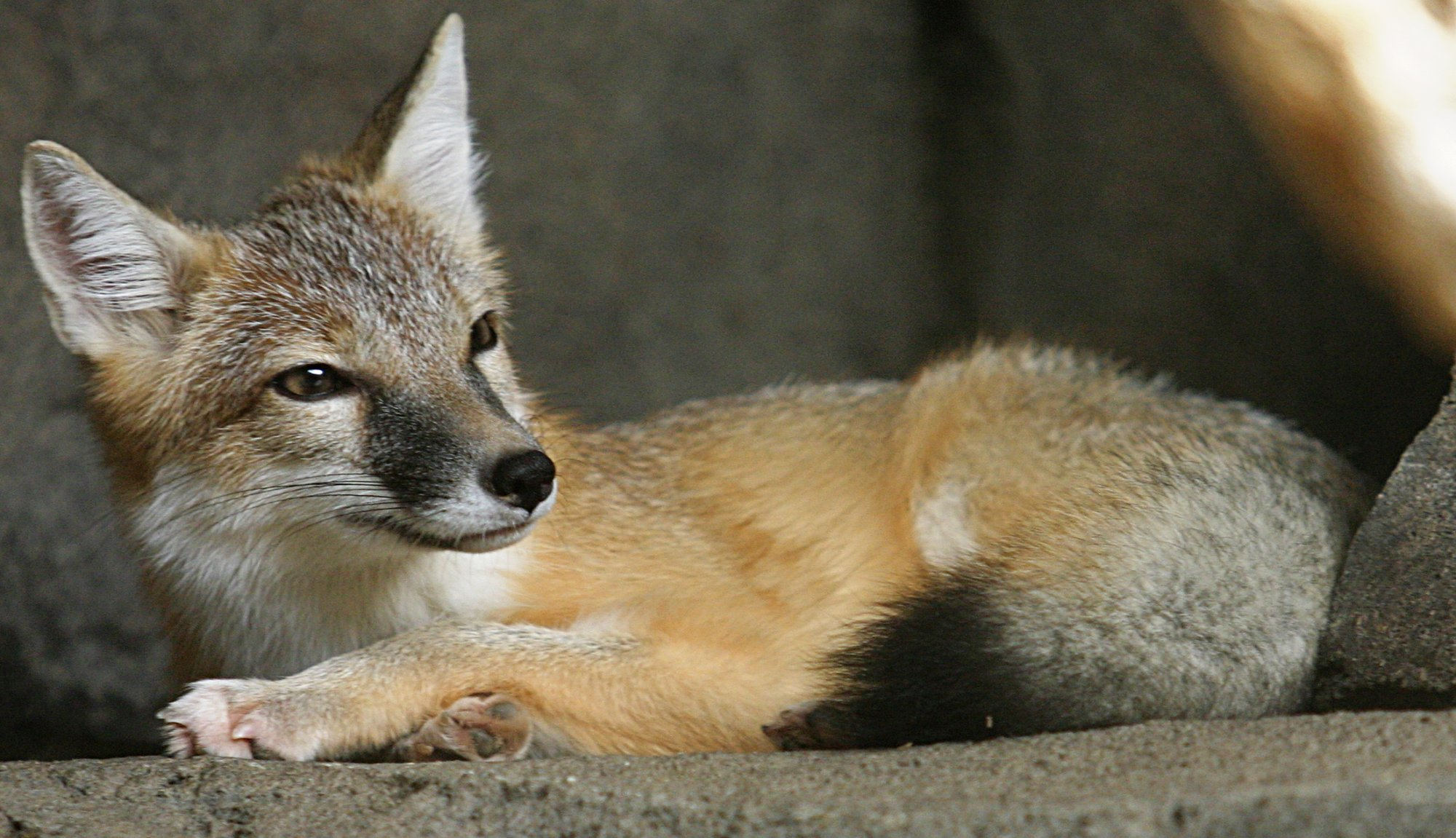
Swift fox

Order: Carnivora, Family: Canidae

Occurrence: Short-grass prairies and deserts

The swift fox (Vulpes velox) is a small light orange-tan fox around the size of a domestic cat found in the western grasslands of North America, such as Colorado, New Mexico and Texas. It also lives in Manitoba, Saskatchewan and Alberta in Canada, where it was previously extirpated. It is closely related to the kit fox and the two species are sometimes known as subspecies of Vulpes velox because hybrids of the two species occur naturally where their ranges overlap.

The swift fox lives primarily in short-grass prairies and deserts. Due to predator control programs in the 1930s, it was considered extinct in Canada for some time, but reintroduction programs have been successful in reintroducing the species. Due to stable populations elsewhere, the species is considered by the IUCN to be of least concern.

=== White-tailed deer ===
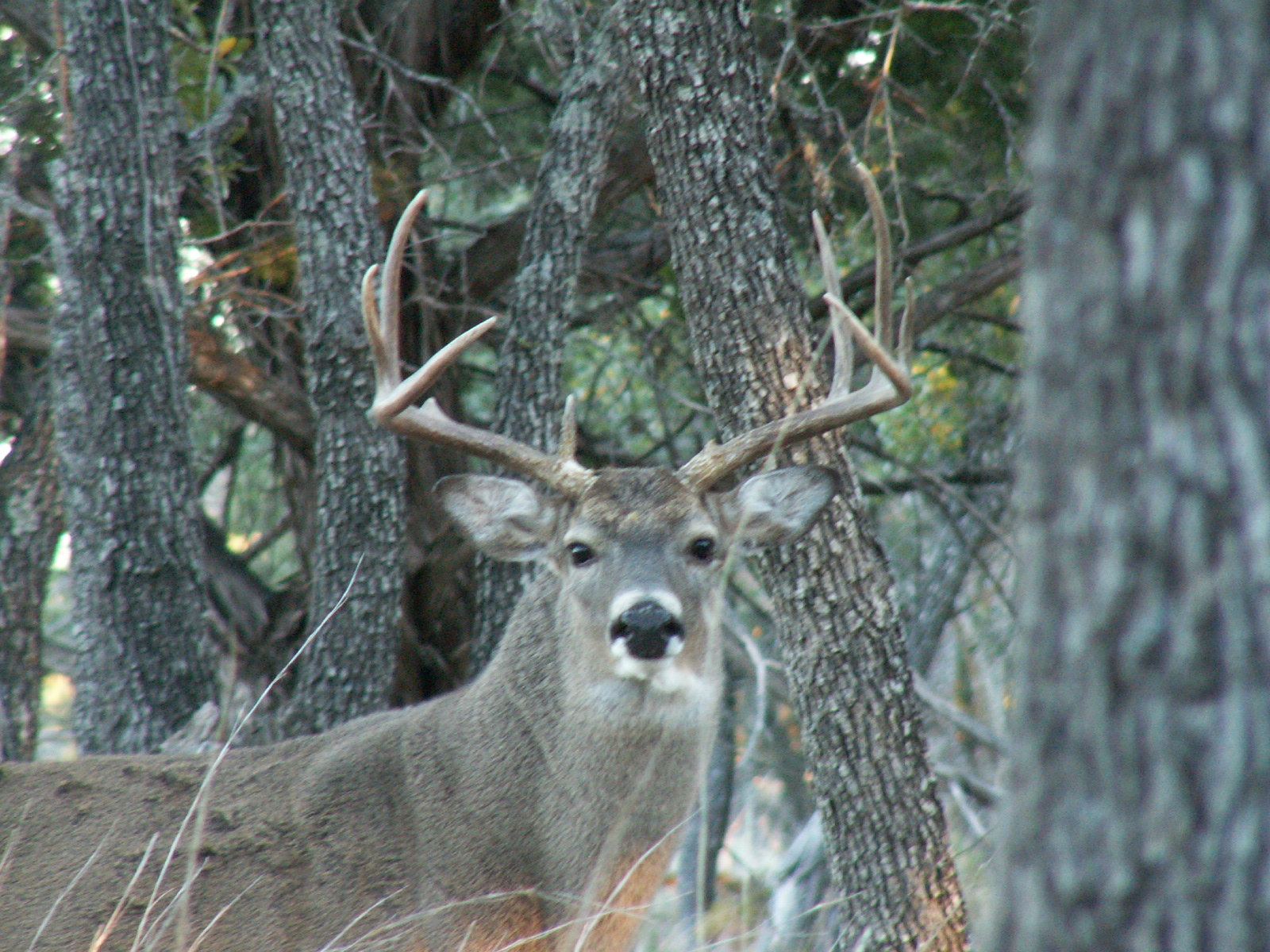
White-tailed deer buck

Order: Artiodactyla, Family: Cervidae

Occurrence: Coniferous forests, meadows, creek and river bottoms

The white-tailed deer (Odocoileus virginianus), also known as the Virginia deer, or simply as the whitetail, is a medium-sized deer native to the United States (all but five of the states), Canada, Mexico, Central America, and in South America as far south as Peru. The species is most common east of the Rocky Mountains, and is absent from much of the western United States, including Nevada, Utah, California, Hawaii, and Alaska (though its close relatives, the mule deer and black-tailed deer, can be found there). It does, however, survive in aspen parklands and deciduous river bottomlands within the central and northern Great Plains, and in mixed deciduous riparian corridors, river valley bottomlands, and lower foothills of the northern Rocky Mountain regions from Wyoming to southeastern British Columbia.

== Small mammals ==
=== Procyonids ===
From the Atlas of Birds, Mammals, Amphibians, and Reptiles in Wyoming:

Order: Carnivora, Family: Procyonidae

- Ringtail, Bassariscus astutus
- Raccoon, Procyon lotor, open forests, stream bottoms

=== Badgers and weasels ===
From the Atlas of Birds, Mammals, Amphibians, and Reptiles in Wyoming:

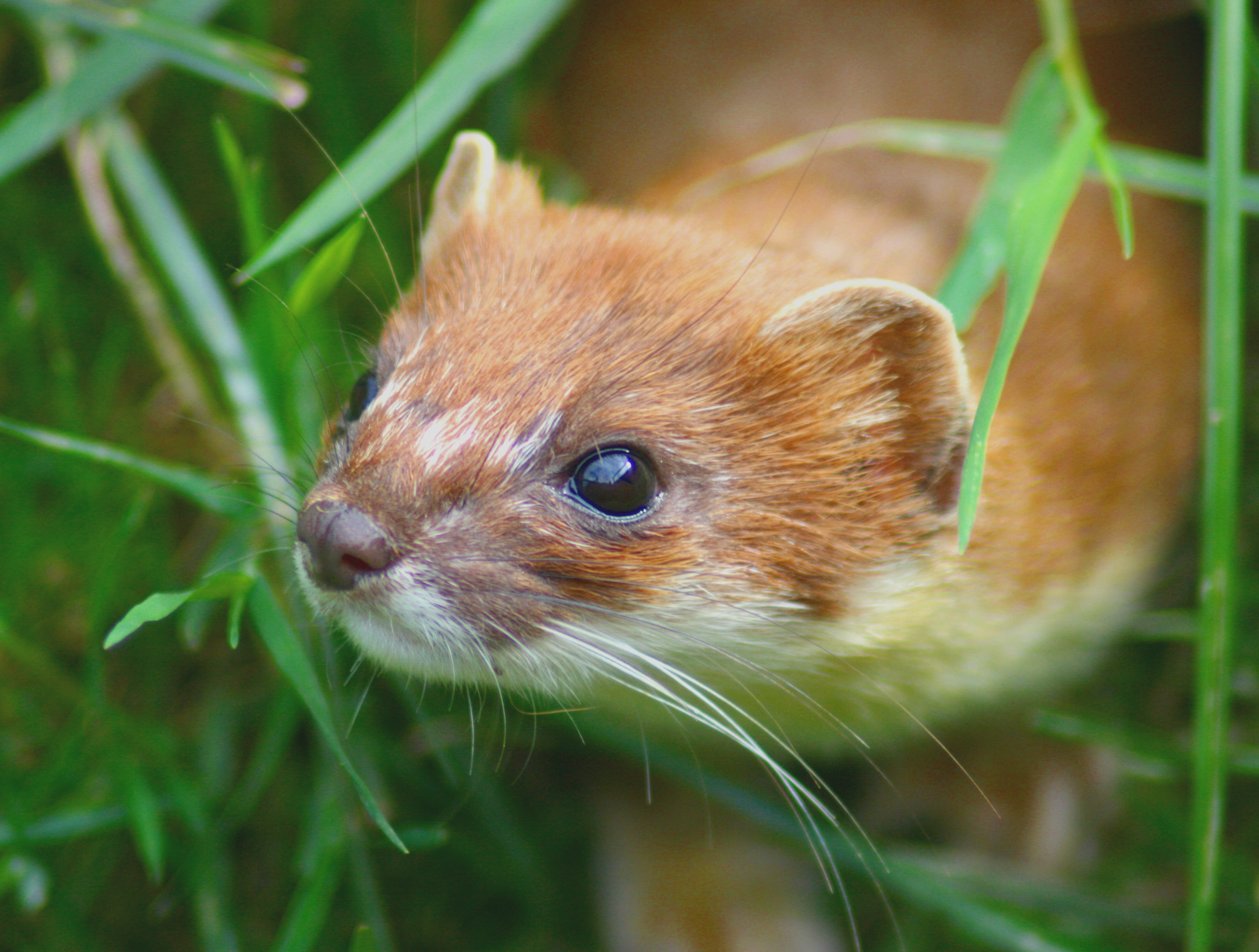
Short-tailed weasel

Order: Carnivora, Family: Mustelidae

- Wolverine, Gulo gulo, coniferous forests and alpine meadows
- North American river otter, Lontra canadensis, rivers, lakes, ponds
- Pacific marten, Martes caurina, coniferous forests
- Black-footed ferret, Mustela nigripes
- Least weasel, Mustela nivalis, open forests and grasslands
- American ermine, Mustela richardsonii, coniferous forests and meadows
- Long-tailed weasel, Neogale frenata, open forests and meadows
- American mink, Neogale vison, creek and lake edges
- Fisher, Pekania pennanti, coniferous forests
- American badger, Taxidea taxus, grasslands

=== Skunks ===
From the Atlas of Birds, Mammals, Amphibians, and Reptiles in Wyoming:

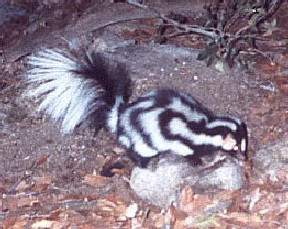
Western spotted skunk

Order: Carnivora, Family: Mephitidae

- Striped skunk, Mephitis mephitis, open forests and grasslands
- Western spotted skunk, Spilogale gracilis
- Eastern spotted skunk, Spilogale putorius

=== Hares and rabbits ===
From the Atlas of Birds, Mammals, Amphibians, and Reptiles in Wyoming:

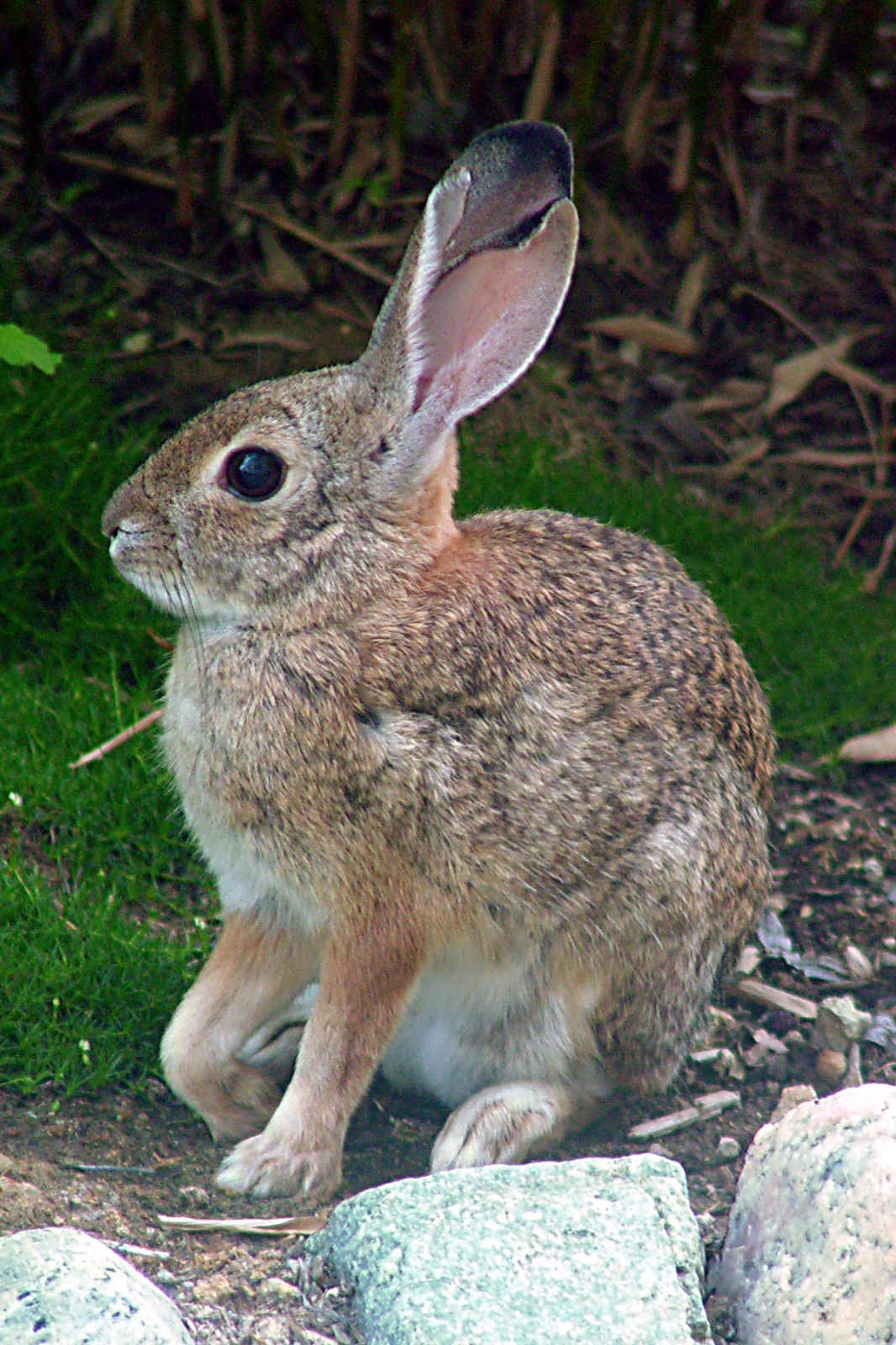
Desert cottontail

Order: Lagomorpha, Family: Leporidae

- Pygmy rabbit, Brachylagus idahoensis
- Snowshoe hare, Lepus americanus, coniferous forests
- Black-tailed jackrabbit, Lepus californicus
- White-tailed jackrabbit, Lepus townsendii, grasslands
- Desert cottontail, Sylvilagus audubonii
- Eastern cottontail, Sylvilagus floridanus
- Mountain cottontail, Sylvilagus nuttallii, forests, brushy areas

=== Pikas ===
From the Atlas of Birds, Mammals, Amphibians, and Reptiles in Wyoming:

Order: Lagomorpha, Family: Ochotonidae

- American pika, Ochotona princeps, rocky slopes

=== Shrews ===
From the Atlas of Birds, Mammals, Amphibians, and Reptiles in Wyoming:

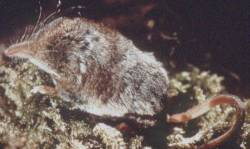
Masked shrew

Order: Eulipotyphla, Family: Soricidae

- Masked shrew, Sorex cinereus, coniferous forests, meadows, ponds and stream edges
- Hayden's shrew, Sorex haydeni
- Pygmy shrew, Sorex hoyi, dry open coniferous forests
- Merriam's shrew, Sorex merriami
- Dusky shrew, Sorex monticolus, higher elevation coniferous forests
- Dwarf shrew, Sorex nanus
- American water shrew, Sorex palustris, stream edges
- Preble's shrew, Sorex preblei
- Vagrant shrew, Sorex vagrans, moist forests and grasslands, marsh and stream edges

=== Beaver ===
From the Atlas of Birds, Mammals, Amphibians, and Reptiles in Wyoming:

Order: Rodentia, Family: Castoridae

- Beaver, Castor canadensis, ponds, streams, lakes

=== Squirrels ===
From the Atlas of Birds, Mammals, Amphibians, and Reptiles in Wyoming:

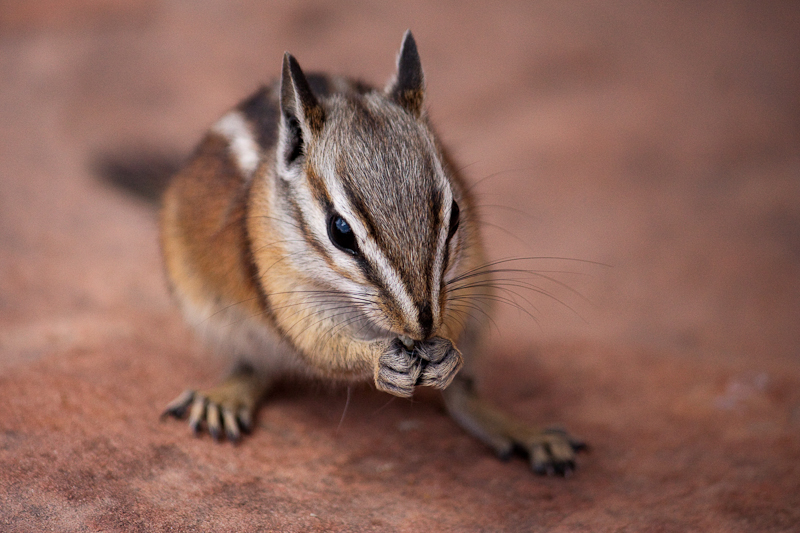
Uinta chipmunk

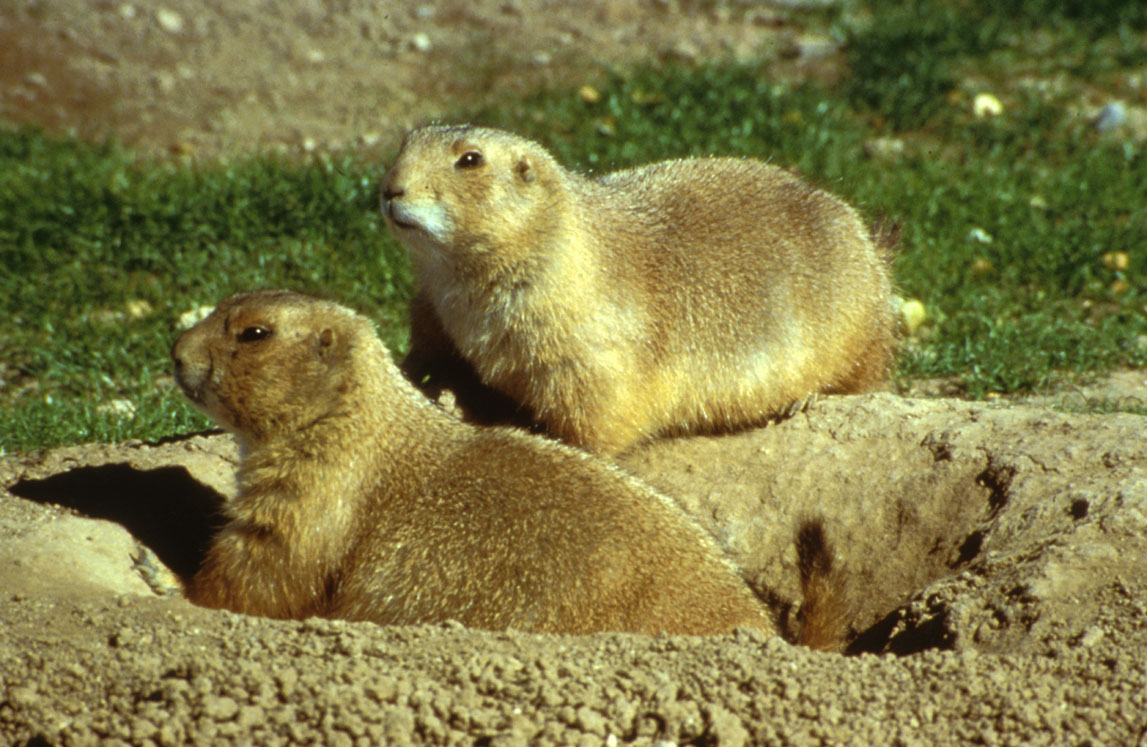
Black-tailed prairie dogs

Order: Rodentia, Family: Sciuridae

- White-tailed prairie dog, Cynomys leucurus
- Black-tailed prairie dog, Cynomys ludovicianus
- Northern flying squirrel, Glaucomys sabrinus, coniferous forests, nocturnal
- Yellow-bellied marmot, Marmota flaviventris, open rocky foothills, talus slopes
- Abert's squirrel, Sciurus aberti
- Eastern fox squirrel, Sciurus niger
- Uinta ground squirrel, Spermophilus armatus
- Wyoming ground squirrel, Spermophilus elegans
- Golden-mantled ground squirrel, Spermophilus lateralis, high open forests, rocky areas
- Spotted ground squirrel, Spermophilus spilosoma
- Thirteen-lined ground squirrel, Spermophilus tridecemlineatus, grasslands
- Yellow-pine chipmunk, Tamias amoenus, open forests, brushy, rocky areas
- Cliff chipmunk, Tamias dorsalis
- Least chipmunk, Tamias minimus, high open forests, brushy, rocky areas, alpine meadows
- Uinta chipmunk, Tamias umbrinus
- American red squirrel, Tamiasciurus hudsonicus

=== Pocket mice and kangaroo rats ===
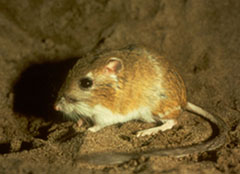
Ord's kangaroo rat

From the Atlas of Birds, Mammals, Amphibians, and Reptiles in Wyoming:

Order: Rodentia, Family: Heteromyidae

- Plains pocket mouse, Perognathus flavescens
- Great Basin pocket mouse, Perognathus parvus
- Hispid pocket mouse, Chaetodipus hispidus
- Olive-backed pocket mouse, Perognathus fasciatus
- Ord's kangaroo rat, Dipodomys ordii
- Silky pocket mouse, Perognathus flavus

=== Pocket gophers ===
From the Atlas of Birds, Mammals, Amphibians, and Reptiles in Wyoming:

Order: Rodentia, Family: Geomyidae

- Northern pocket gopher, Thomomys talpoides, meadows
- Idaho pocket gopher, Thomomys idahoensis
- Wyoming pocket gopher, Thomomys clusius
- Plains pocket gopher, Geomys bursarius

=== Mice ===
From the Atlas of Birds, Mammals, Amphibians, and Reptiles in Wyoming:

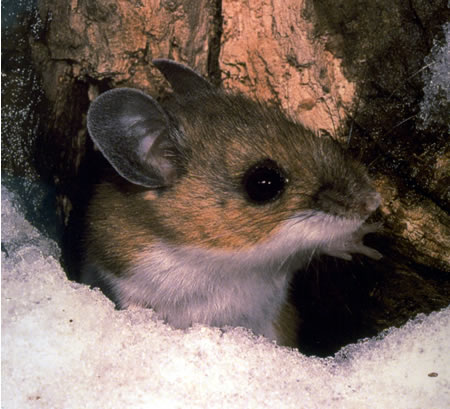
Deer mouse

Order: Rodentia, Family: Cricetidae

- Western deer mouse, Peromyscus sonoriensis, forests, grasslands, alpine meadows
- Northern grasshopper mouse, Onychomys leucogaster
- Western harvest mouse, Reithrodontomys megalotis
- Plains harvest mouse, Reithrodontomys montanus
- White-footed mouse, Peromyscus leucopus
- Pinyon mouse, Peromyscus truei
- Canyon mouse, Peromyscus crinitus

=== Jumping mice ===
From the Atlas of Birds, Mammals, Amphibians, and Reptiles in Wyoming:

Order: Rodentia, Family: Dipodidae

- Western jumping mouse, Zapus princeps, grasslands, alpine meadows
- Meadow jumping mouse, Zapus hudsonius

=== Muskrats, voles and woodrats ===
From the Atlas of Birds, Mammals, Amphibians, and Reptiles in Wyoming:

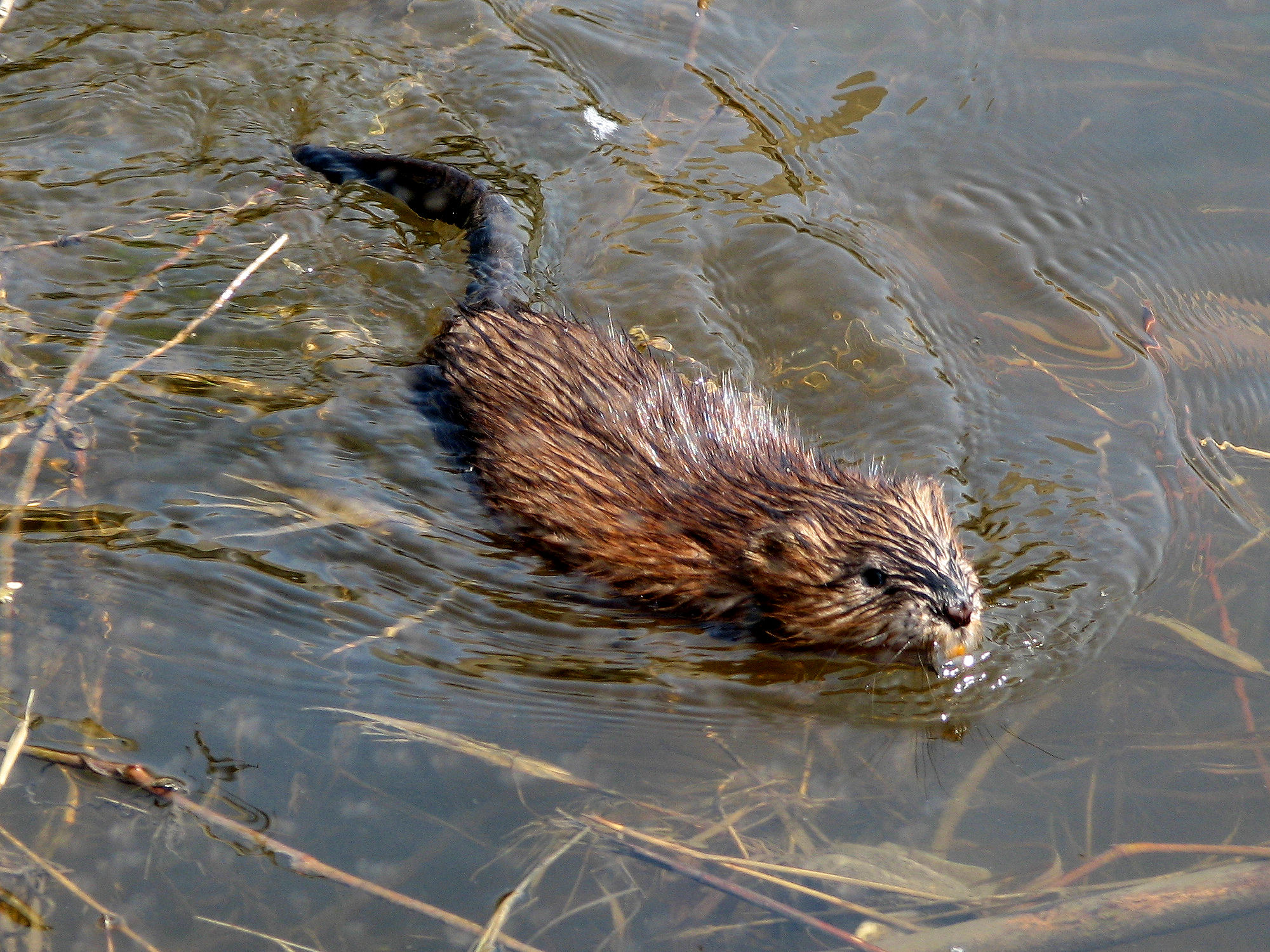
Muskrat

Order: Rodentia, Family: Cricetidae

- Muskrat, Ondatra zibethicus, streams, lakes, marshy areas
- Heather vole, Phenacomys intermedius, coniferous forests, alpine meadows
- Long-tailed vole, Microtus longicaudus, coniferous forests, grasslands
- Meadow vole, Microtus pennsylvanicus, open forests, meadows, along streams, marshy areas
- Southern red-backed vole, Clethrionomys gapperi, coniferous forests
- Water vole, Microtus richardsoni, high elevation stream and lake edges
- Montane vole, Microtus montanus
- Prairie vole, Microtus ochrogaster
- Sagebrush vole, Lemmiscus curtatus
- Bushy-tailed woodrat, Neotoma cinerea, rocky areas, old buildings

=== Porcupines ===
Order: Rodentia, Family: Erethizontidae

- North American porcupine, Erethizon dorsatum, coniferous forests

=== Bats ===
From the Atlas of Birds, Mammals, Amphibians, and Reptiles in Wyoming:

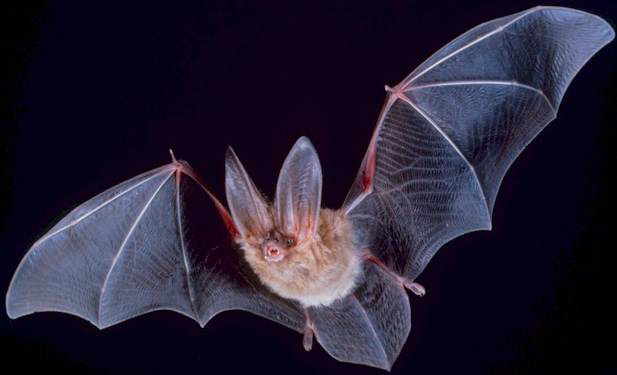
Townsend's big-eared bat

Order: Chiroptera, Family: Vespertilionidae

- Big brown bat, Eptesicus fuscus, coniferous forests, often around buildings, caves
- Hoary bat, Lasiurus cinereus, coniferous forests, mostly nocturnal
- Little brown bat, Myotis lucifugus, coniferous forests, often around buildings, caves, nocturnal
- Long-eared myotis, Myotis evotis, coniferous forests, meadows, nocturnal
- Long-legged bat, Myotis volans, coniferous forests, meadows, nocturnal
- Silver-haired bat, Lasionycteris noctivagans, coniferous forests, meadows, nocturnal
- California myotis, Myotis californicus
- Eastern red bat, Lasiurus borealis
- Fringed myotis, Myotis thysanodes
- Northern myotis, Myotis septentrionalis
- Pallid bat, Antrozous pallidus
- Spotted bat, Euderma maculatum
- Townsend's big-eared bat, Corynorhinus townsendii
- Western small-footed myotis, Myotis ciliolabrum
- Yuma myotis, Myotis yumanensis
- Eastern pipistrelle, Pipistrellus subflavus
- Brazilian free-tailed bat, Tadarida brasiliensis
- Big free-tailed bat, Nyctinomops macrotis

== Exotic species, not native to Wyoming ==
=== Small mammals ===
- Eastern gray squirrel, Sciurus carolinensis
- Virginia opossum, Didelphis virginiana
- House mouse, Mus musculus
- Norway rat, Rattus norvegicus

== See also ==
- Amphibians and reptiles of Wyoming
- List of birds of Wyoming
