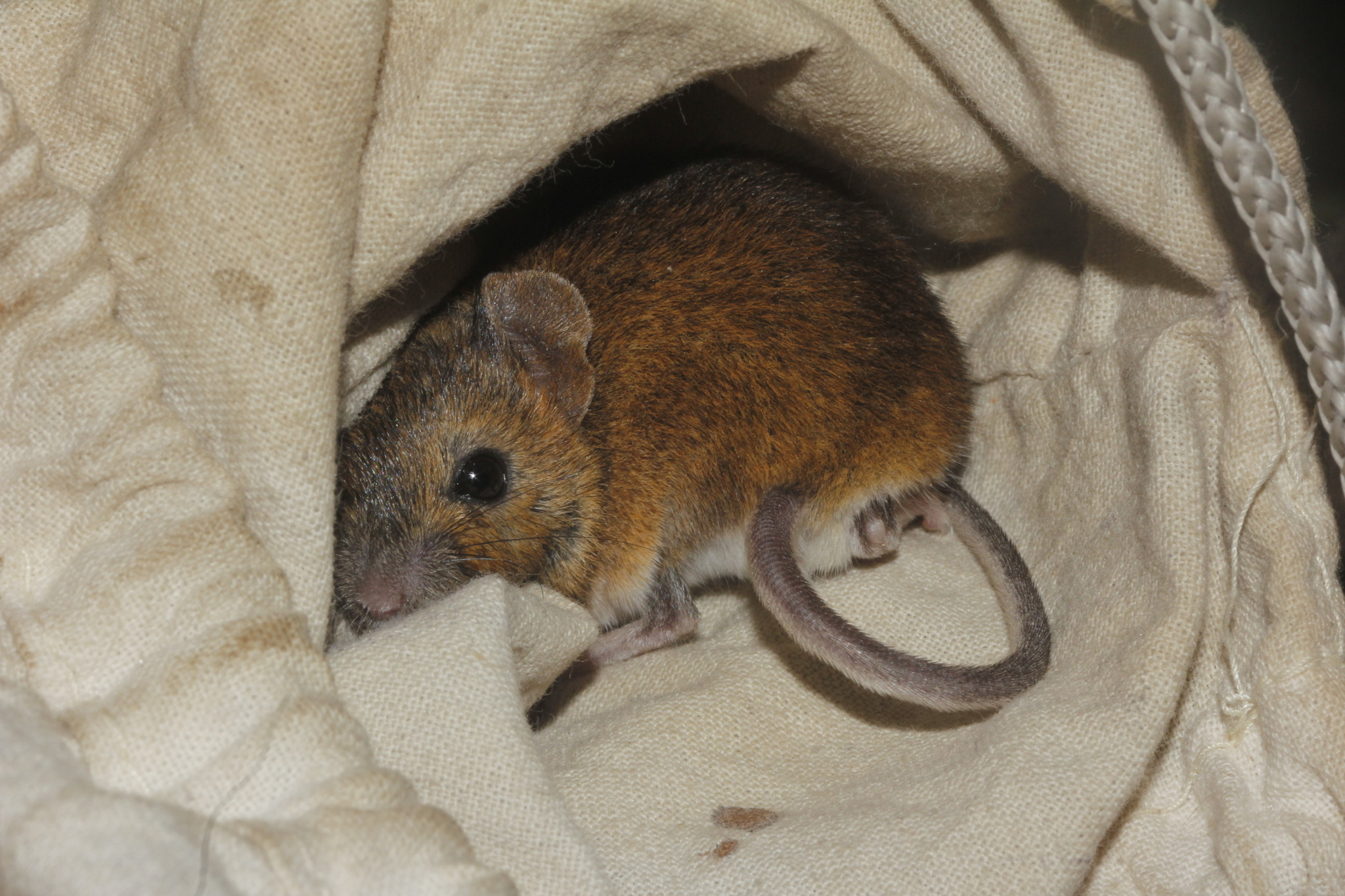

Conservation status
- Least Concern (IUCN 3.1)

Scientific classification
- Domain: Eukaryota
- Kingdom: Animalia
- Phylum: Chordata
- Class: Mammalia
- Order: Rodentia
- Family: Cricetidae
- Subfamily: Neotominae
- Genus: Reithrodontomys
- Species: R. sumichrasti

Binomial name
- Reithrodontomys sumichrasti (Saussure, 1861)

= Sumichrast's harvest mouse =

Species of rodent

Sumichrast's harvest mouse (Reithrodontomys sumichrasti) is a species of rodent in the family Cricetidae. It is found in Costa Rica, El Salvador, Guatemala, Honduras, Mexico, Nicaragua, and Panama.
