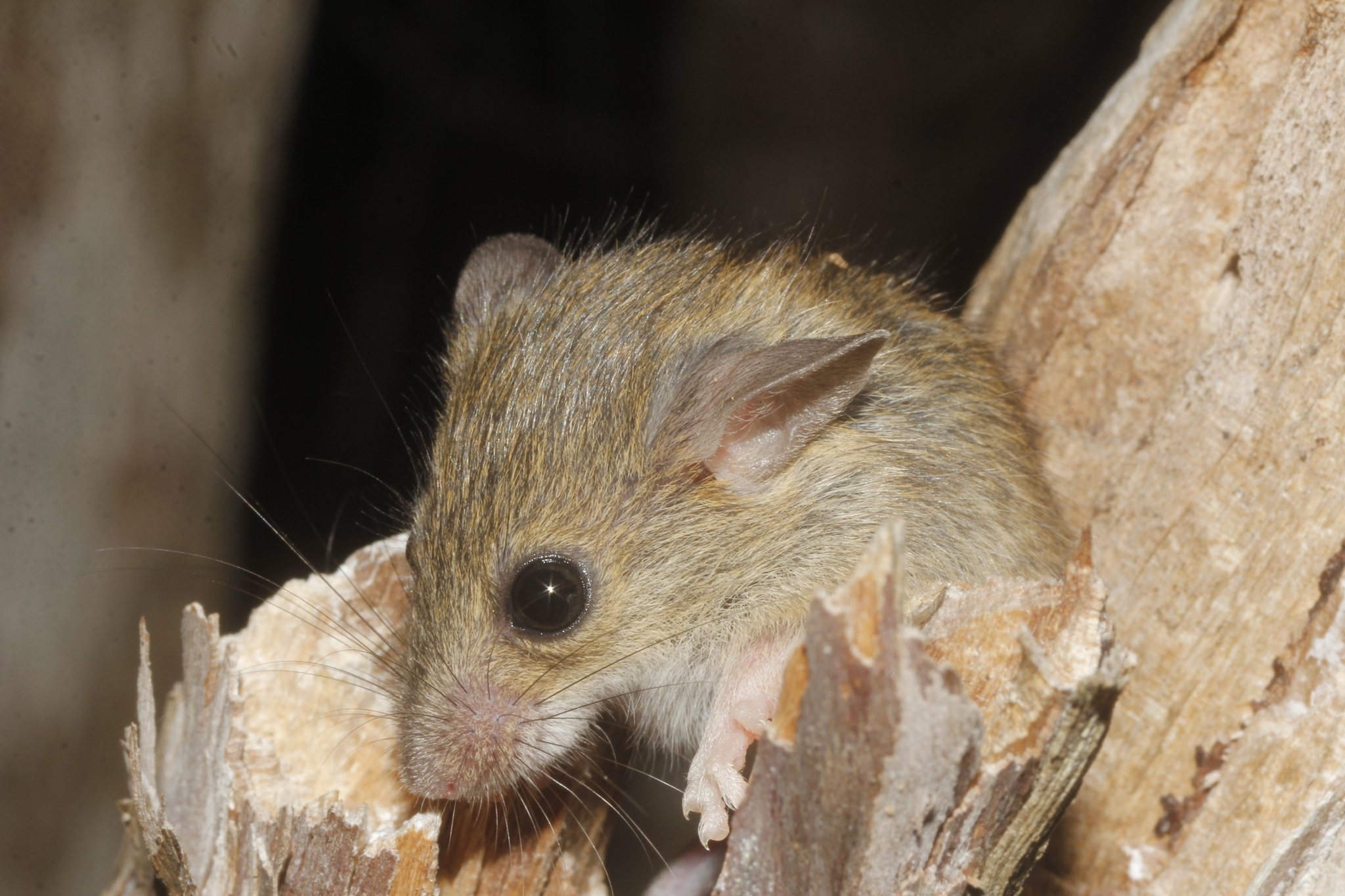

Conservation status
- Least Concern (IUCN 3.1)

Scientific classification
- Kingdom: Animalia
- Phylum: Chordata
- Class: Mammalia
- Order: Rodentia
- Family: Cricetidae
- Subfamily: Neotominae
- Genus: Reithrodontomys
- Species: R. gracilis

Binomial name
- Reithrodontomys gracilis J.A. Allen & Chapman, 1897

= Slender harvest mouse =

Species of rodent

The slender harvest mouse (Reithrodontomys gracilis) is a species of rodent in the family Cricetidae. It is small and mouse-like and is distributed throughout a portion of Central America.

== Description ==
The slender harvest mouse has short pale pelage. Upper areas and back appearing somewhat darker than their under sides which vary from a pinkish cinnamon color to tawny, orange, or white. Ears are brown or black with little pelage. The coloration of the feet may vary seasonally and geographically. Their tails are slender and scaly with scattered hairs and may be bicolored to clove brown.

== Range and habitat ==
The slender harvest mouse can be found in Belize, Costa Rica, El Salvador, Guatemala, Honduras, Mexico, and Nicaragua. General distribution is in elevations from sea level to near 1,400 meters from southern Mexico in the Yucatán Peninsula to northwestern Costa Rica. Populations favor semiarid and arid areas with apparent ground cover, from tropical evergreen and deciduous forests to cactus covered desert areas. Never reported as common and no well published estimated of numbers. It is notable that this species is also somewhat scansorial, being found on cliffs, in trees, and among roots.

== Reproduction ==
Very little is known of the slender harvest mouse's reproduction. Litter sizes seems to range from 2 to 4, but three being average. The reproductive season is likely extended from late winter to mid-autumn.

== Phylogeny ==
The slender harvest mouse may be considered under the subfamily Muridae and is within the subgenera of Aprodon and in the clade R. mexicanus. The closest relation to the slender harvest mouse is the Cozumel harvest mouse, R. spectabilis. Five subspecies of R. gracilis are currently recognized, but do not form a monophyletic group. The slender harvest mouse differs in the other members of its subgenus in that it is smaller with an elongated skull. Limb bones of a small harvest mouse, possibly R. gracilis, was found in a cave on the Yucatán Peninsula and dated to the Pleistocene.
