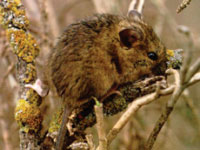
- Salt marsh harvest mouse (Reithrodontomys raviventris)

Scientific classification
- Domain: Eukaryota
- Kingdom: Animalia
- Phylum: Chordata
- Class: Mammalia
- Order: Rodentia
- Family: Cricetidae
- Subfamily: Neotominae
- Tribe: Reithrodontomyini
- Genus: Reithrodontomys; Giglioli, 1873

Type species
- Reithrodon megalotis

Species
- See text

= Reithrodontomys =

Reithrodontomys Temporal range: Early Pliocene–Recent

Genus of rodents

Reithrodontomys is the genus of groove-toothed New World harvest mice.

== Species ==
This genus contains these species:

- Baker's small-toothed harvest mouse, Reithrodontomys bakeri
- Short-nosed harvest mouse, Reithrodontomys brevirostris
- Sonoran harvest mouse, Reithrodontomys burti
- Volcano harvest mouse, Reithrodontomys chrysopsis
- Chiriqui harvest mouse, Reithrodontomys creper
- Darien harvest mouse, Reithrodontomys darienensis
- Fulvous harvest mouse, Reithrodontomys fulvescens
- Slender harvest mouse, Reithrodontomys gracilis
- Hairy harvest mouse, Reithrodontomys hirsutus
- Eastern harvest mouse, Reithrodontomys humulis
- Western harvest mouse, Reithrodontomys megalotis
- Mexican harvest mouse, Reithrodontomys mexicanus
- Small-toothed harvest mouse, Reithrodontomys microdon
- Plains harvest mouse, Reithrodontomys montanus
- Small harvest mouse, Reithrodontomys musseri
- Nicaraguan harvest mouse, Reithrodontomys paradoxus
- Salt marsh harvest mouse, Reithrodontomys raviventris
- Rodriguez's harvest mouse, Reithrodontomys rodriguezi
- Cozumel harvest mouse, Reithrodontomys spectabilis
- Sumichrast's harvest mouse, Reithrodontomys sumichrasti
- Narrow-nosed harvest mouse, Reithrodontomys tenuirostris
- Zacatecas harvest mouse, Reithrodontomys zacatecae
