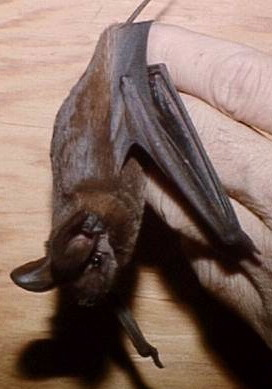
- Big free-tailed bat (Nyctinomops macrotis)

Scientific classification
- Domain: Eukaryota
- Kingdom: Animalia
- Phylum: Chordata
- Class: Mammalia
- Order: Chiroptera
- Family: Molossidae
- Genus: Nyctinomops; Miller, 1902

Type species
- Nyctinomus femorosaccus Merriam, 1889

Species
- Nyctinomops aurispinosus Nyctinomops femorosaccus Nyctinomops laticaudatus Nyctinomops macrotis

= Nyctinomops =

Genus of bats

Nyctinomops is a genus of bats in the family Molossidae.
