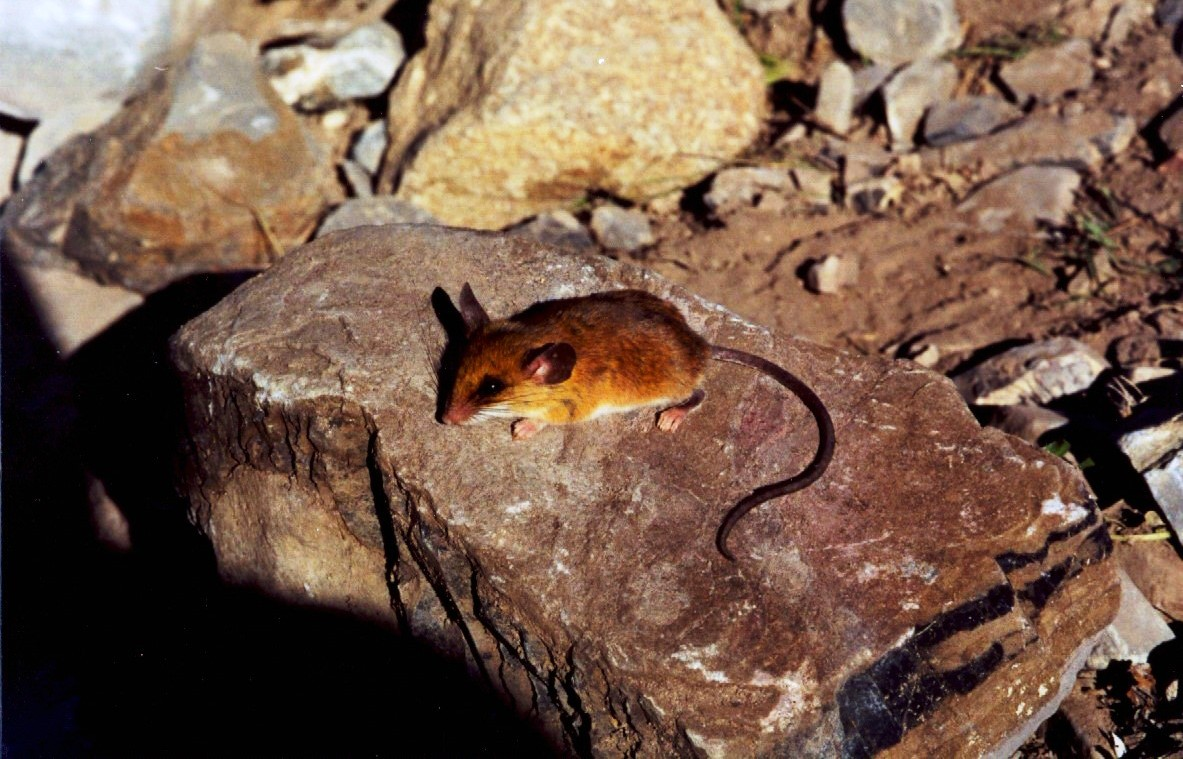

Conservation status
- Endangered (IUCN 3.1)

Scientific classification
- Kingdom: Animalia
- Phylum: Chordata
- Class: Mammalia
- Order: Rodentia
- Family: Cricetidae
- Subfamily: Neotominae
- Genus: Reithrodontomys
- Species: R. bakeri

Binomial name
- Reithrodontomys bakeri Bradley, 2004

= Baker's small-toothed harvest mouse =

Species of rodent

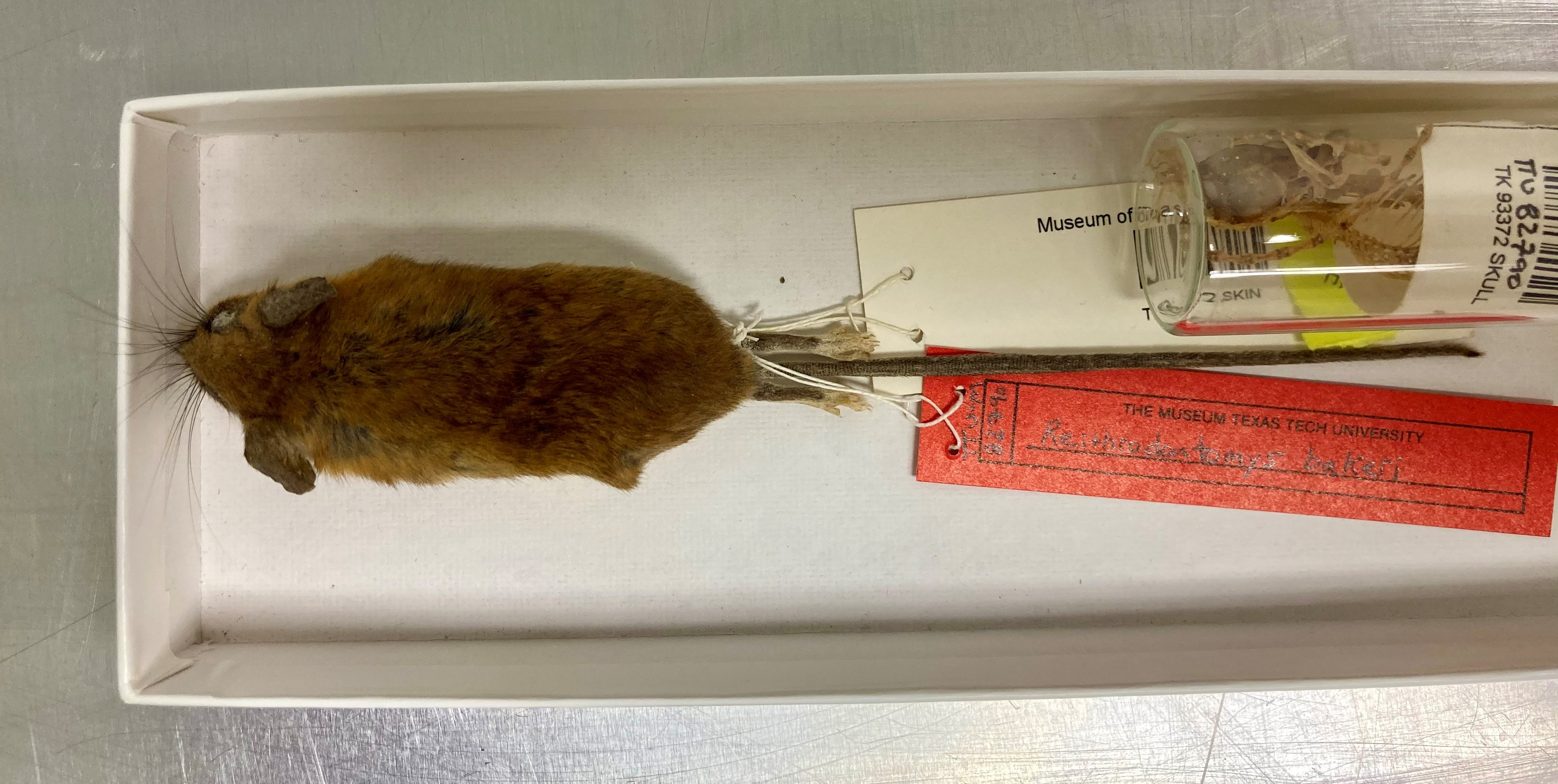
Holotype of Reithrodontomys bakeri in the Natural Science Research Laboratory's (NSRL) collection at the Museum of Texas Tech University.

Baker's small-toothed harvest mouse (Reithrodontomys bakeri) is a species of rodent in the family Cricetidae. It is one of about 20 species of the genus Reithrodontomys. This species was discovered in 2004 and is found in Central Mexico.
