= Cozumel harvest mouse =

Conservation status
- Critically Endangered (IUCN 3.1)

Scientific classification
- Kingdom: Animalia
- Phylum: Chordata
- Class: Mammalia
- Order: Rodentia
- Family: Cricetidae
- Subfamily: Neotominae
- Genus: Reithrodontomys
- Species: R. spectabilis

Binomial name
- Reithrodontomys spectabilis Jones & Lawlor, 1965
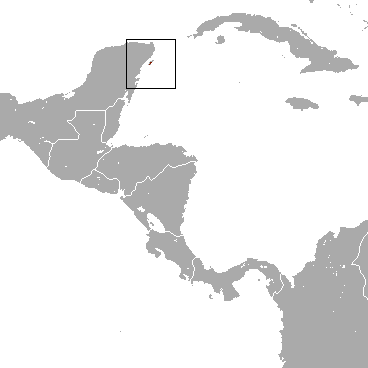
- Cozumel harvest mouse range

Species of rodent

The Cozumel harvest mouse (Reithrodontomys spectabilis) is a species of rodent in the family Cricetidae. It is endemic to the Mexican island of Cozumel off the Yucatán Peninsula. It is nocturnal and semiarboreal, and lives in dense secondary forest and forest edge habitats. Its population is small, fluctuating and patchily distributed. The species is threatened by predation from feral cats and dogs and introduced boa constrictors, by competition with introduced nonnative rats and mice, and by habitat disturbances caused by hurricanes and floods which periodically strike the island.
