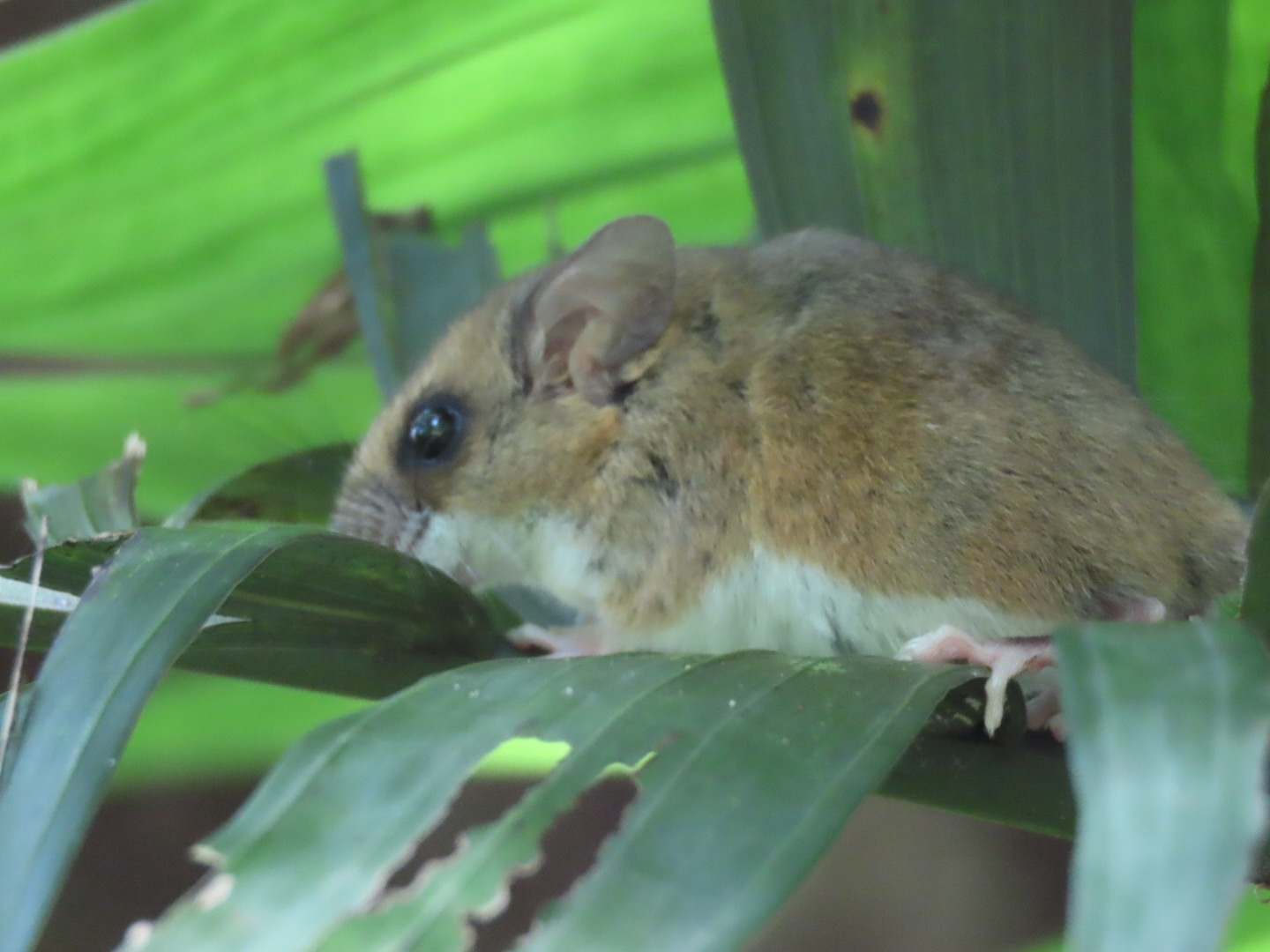

Conservation status
- Least Concern (IUCN 3.1)

Scientific classification
- Kingdom: Animalia
- Phylum: Chordata
- Class: Mammalia
- Order: Rodentia
- Family: Cricetidae
- Subfamily: Neotominae
- Genus: Reithrodontomys
- Species: R. mexicanus

Binomial name
- Reithrodontomys mexicanus (Saussure, 1860)

= Mexican harvest mouse =

Species of rodent

The Mexican harvest mouse (Reithrodontomys mexicanus) is a species of rodent in the family Cricetidae. It is found in Colombia, Costa Rica, Ecuador, El Salvador, Guatemala, Honduras, Mexico, Nicaragua, and Panama in a variety of habitats at altitudes from sea level to 3800 m.
