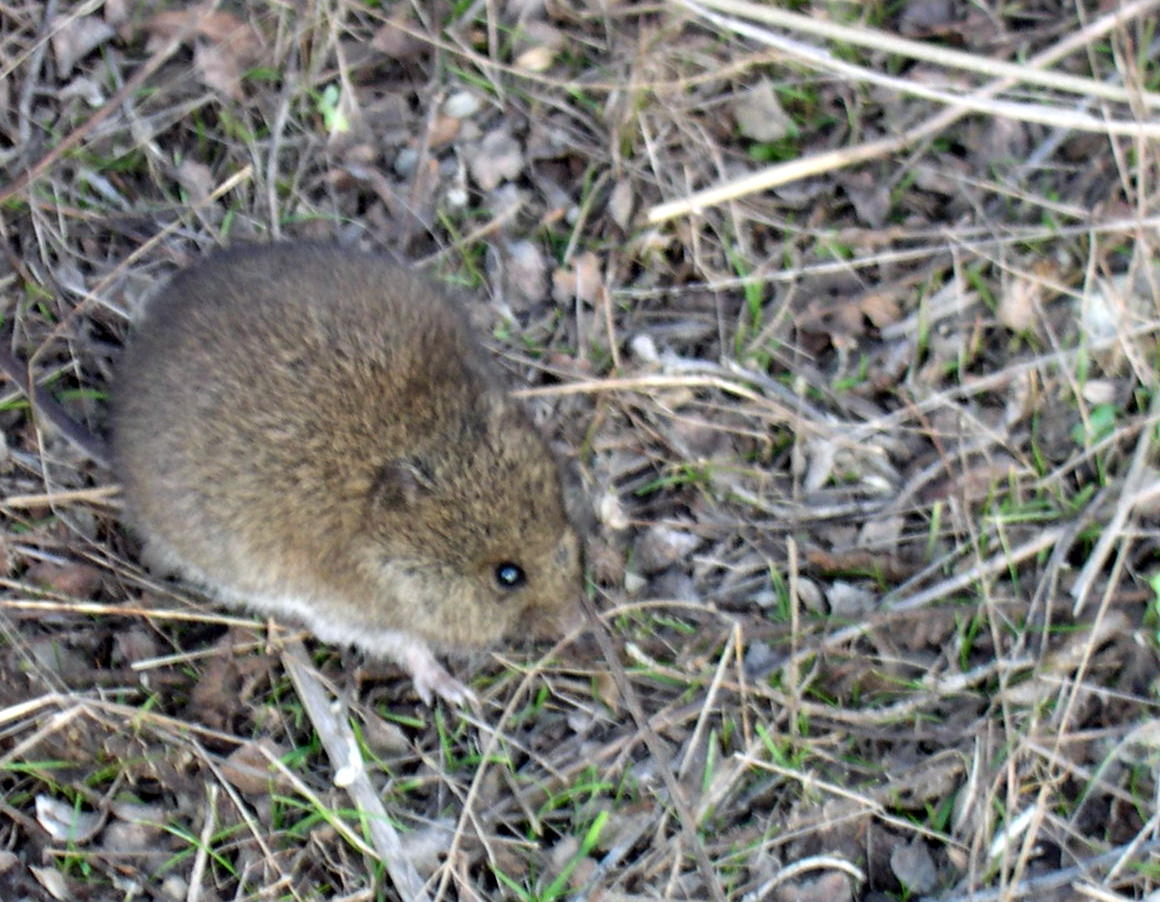

Conservation status
- Least Concern (IUCN 3.1)

Scientific classification
- Kingdom: Animalia
- Phylum: Chordata
- Class: Mammalia
- Order: Rodentia
- Family: Cricetidae
- Subfamily: Neotominae
- Genus: Reithrodontomys
- Species: R. megalotis

Binomial name
- Reithrodontomys megalotis (Baird, 1857)

Synonyms
- Reithrodon megalotis (Baird, 1858); Reithrodontomys amoles A.H. Howell, 1914; Reithrodontomys arizonensis J.A. Allen, 1895; Reithrodontomys aztecus J.A. Allen, 1893; Reithrodontomys dychei J.A. Allen, 1895; Reithrodontomys dychei subsp. nebrascensis J.A. Allen, 1895; Reithrodontomys megalotis subsp. arizonensis J.A. Allen, 1895; Reithrodontomys megalotis subsp. distichlis von Bloeker, 1937; Reithrodontomys megalotis subsp. limicola von Bloeker, 1932; Reithrodontomys megalotis subsp. ravus Goldman, 1939; Reithrodontomys megalotis subsp. santacruzae Pearson, 1951; Reithrodontomys saturatus subsp. alticolus Merriam, 1901; Rhithrodontomys catalinae Elliot, 1904; Rhithrodontomys peninsulae Elliot, 1903

= Western harvest mouse =

Species of rodent

The western harvest mouse (Reithrodontomys megalotis) is a small neotomine mouse native to most of the western United States. Many authorities consider the endangered salt marsh harvest mouse to be a subspecies, but the two are now usually treated separately.

== Distribution ==
Its range extends from southwest British Columbia and southeast Alberta continuously to west Texas, northeast Arkansas, northwest Indiana, southwest Wisconsin, and the interior of Mexico to Oaxaca.

== Description and comparison with similar species ==
The harvest mouse has brownish fur with buff sides, a white belly, and an indistinct white stripe on the fur along the spine. Adults grow up to 11 to 17 centimetres (4.3 to 6.7 in) in length with a tail length of 5 to 10 centimetres (2.0 to 3.9 in). Their height (from the ground to the highest point of their back) is between 1.5 and 2.0 centimeters. A mature mouse weighs anywhere from 9 to 22 grams (0.32 to 0.78 oz). There is no sexual dimorphism in this species.

Similar species are the plains harvest mouse (Reithrodontomys montanus), which has a more distinct but narrower stripe on its spine, and the fulvous harvest mouse (R. fulvescens), which has a longer tail. Also similar is the salt marsh harvest mouse (R. raviventris), which has an underbelly fur that is more pinkish cinnamon to tawny. Finally, the house mouse (Mus musculus) has incisors without grooves, unlike those of the western harvest mouse. The dental formula of R. megalotis is 1.0.0.31.0.0.3 = 16.

== Behavior ==
The mouse is nocturnal, with particularly intense activity on very dark nights. This mouse is particularly resourceful, making use of the ground runways of other rodents. It is also a very agile climber. Once temperatures reach a certain degree, the western harvest mouse goes into torpor, but scientists have yet to determine if it goes into true hibernation. This mouse builds spherical nests that are about 125mm in diameter. These nests can be found on the ground or under trees, logs, or plants that aid in protection from predators. Nests can also be found above ground or in burrows. There are usually one or more access points at the base of the nest.

== Diet ==
The western harvest mouse is an herbivore with a diet consisting of mainly seeds and grains from various plants. These plants include: fruits, vetch, blue grass, fescue, oats, and brome grass. In preparation for autumn and winter, the western harvest mouse stores its food along runways created throughout fields that it occupies and in underground vaults. Although its primary food source is seeds, springtime dining is augmented with new plant growth. In June, July and August the mouse is known to consume certain insects, especially grasshoppers and caterpillars.

== Breeding ==
Breeding nests are spherical constructions woven from grass or other plant material. A nest is approximately 13 centimeters in diameter and lined with a more downy material of fibrous plants. A nest may have one or more entrances near its base. Most commonly, the nest is built on the ground in a protected area such as within a shrub or beside a fallen tree. However, the mouse will occasionally place the nest above-ground within a shrub.

It breeds from early spring to late autumn, with reduced activity at midsummer. The gestation period is 23 to 24 days. Repeated fertilization often occurs immediately after giving birth. It is not uncommon for a female to have ten to fourteen litters per annum, with a typical litter size of two to six individuals. However, litters of up to nine offspring can occur. Thus an annual production of forty to sixty young per female is normal. Newborn mice weigh approximately 1.0 to 1.5 grams.

== Threats ==
Domestic and feral cats are a threat to the western harvest mouse. On the IUCN Red List it is listed as "Least Concern" (LC). Its many predators include the fox, weasel, coyote, hawk, snake and owl species. Other predators include shrikes, squirrels, raptors, short-tailed shrews, cats, and scorpions.
