= Hairy harvest mouse =

Conservation status
- Vulnerable (IUCN 3.1)

Scientific classification
- Kingdom: Animalia
- Phylum: Chordata
- Class: Mammalia
- Order: Rodentia
- Family: Cricetidae
- Subfamily: Neotominae
- Genus: Reithrodontomys
- Species: R. hirsutus

Binomial name
- Reithrodontomys hirsutus Merriam, 1901

Species of rodent

The hairy harvest mouse (Reithrodontomys hirsutus) is a species of rodent in the family Cricetidae found only in Mexico.
