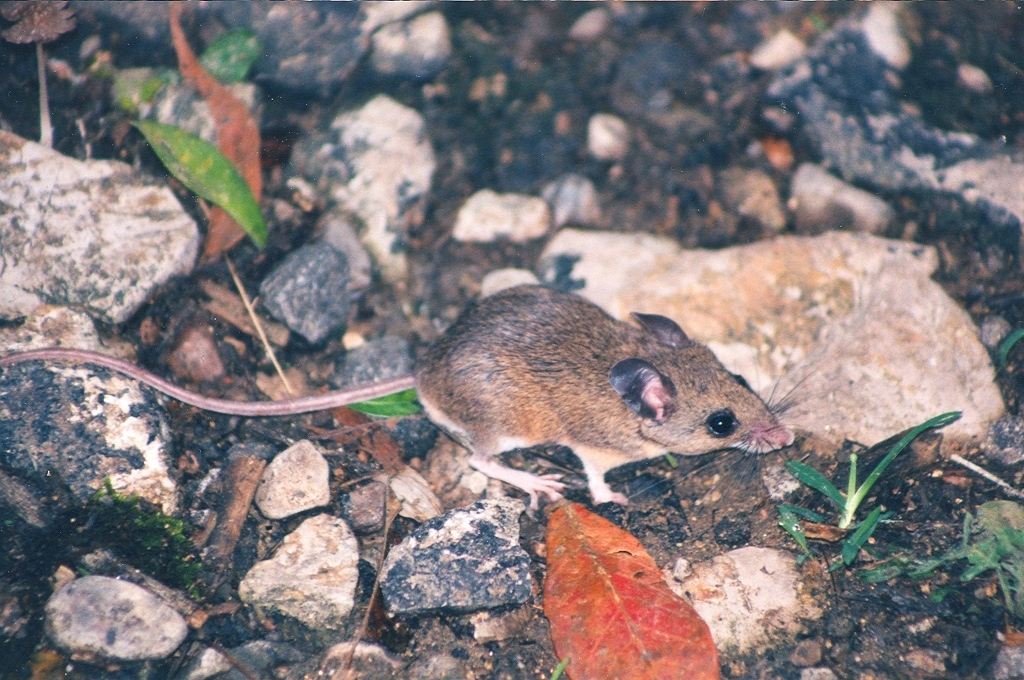

Conservation status
- Least Concern (IUCN 3.1)

Scientific classification
- Kingdom: Animalia
- Phylum: Chordata
- Class: Mammalia
- Order: Rodentia
- Family: Cricetidae
- Subfamily: Neotominae
- Genus: Reithrodontomys
- Species: R. fulvescens

Binomial name
- Reithrodontomys fulvescens J.A.Allen, 1894

= Fulvous harvest mouse =

Species of rodent

The fulvous harvest mouse (Reithrodontomys fulvescens) is a species of rodent in the family Cricetidae. It is found in El Salvador, Guatemala, Honduras, Mexico, Nicaragua, and the United States.

== Description ==
About 17 subspecies of R. fulvescens are recognised and they vary in both colouring and size. Their total length ranges from about 134 to 189 mm (5.3 to 7.4 in) with a tail between 73 and 116 mm (2.9 and 4.6 in). Their yellowish-buff or tawny fur is relatively coarse and has a streaked or speckled effect caused by the mixture of black guard hairs and the paler, banded hairs of the undercoat. Often, a dark stripe runs along the spine. The underparts are grayish-white, sometimes tinged with buff. This mouse can be distinguished from the rather larger hairy harvest mouse (Reithrodontomys hirsutus) by its pelage and skull characteristics, the pale underside of the tail and the whitish or buff color of the hind feet.

The karyotype has 2n = 50.

== Distribution and habitat ==
The fulvous harvest mouse has a widespread distribution with a range extending from Honduras, Guatemala and El Salvador northwards through Mexico to the southwestern United States, where it is present in Arizona, Texas, Oklahoma, Kansas, Missouri, Arkansas, and Mississippi. Its typical habitat is grassy areas containing some shrubs, especially in areas with mesquite or pine/grass ecozones.

== Biology ==
The fulvous harvest mouse is nocturnal. In Arkansas, animals began to deposit fat in their tissues in November and this peaks in January and then the fat reserves are steadily used up by April. Other adaptations to winter include a lengthening of the animal's hair and a possible daily reduction of its body temperature during sleep in the daytime. The animal quickly recovers from hypothermia and resumes activity when it warms up. A nest is built in vegetation just off the ground and consists of a ball of grasses and sedges about 75 mm (3.0 in) in diameter. It is usually occupied by a pair of mice which may be a pair-bonded male and female. When the mice are inside, the entrance, or pair of entrances, is plugged. When the animals move about outside, much of their time is spent off the ground in low vegetation.

The diet of the fulvous harvest mouse varies seasonally, but in milder climates, consists primarily of insects and other invertebrates throughout the year, whereas in colder regions, invertebrates predominate in the spring, and seeds in the fall and winter. A small proportion of green leafy and other plant food is also eaten. Predators of this mouse include barn owls (Tyto alba) and red-tailed hawks (Buteo jamaicensis).

In Mexico, breeding seems to take place throughout the year, but in Texas, usually two breeding peaks occur, one in late spring and the second a few months later. The litter size is usually two to four offspring, but may be more. The young are blind, naked, and helpless at birth, their eyes open between the ninth and 12th days and weaning takes place between the 13th and 16th. Life expectancy is up to 15 months for males and up to 12 months for females.
