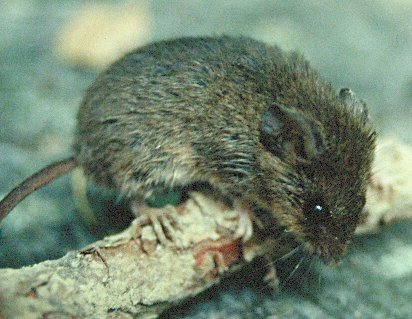

Conservation status
- Least Concern (IUCN 3.1)

Scientific classification
- Kingdom: Animalia
- Phylum: Chordata
- Class: Mammalia
- Order: Rodentia
- Family: Cricetidae
- Subfamily: Neotominae
- Genus: Reithrodontomys
- Species: R. humulis

Binomial name
- Reithrodontomys humulis (Audubon & Bachman, 1841)

= Eastern harvest mouse =

Species of rodent

The eastern harvest mouse (Reithrodontomys humulis) is a species of rodent in the family Cricetidae. It is endemic to the Southeastern United States. Its natural habitats are subtropical or tropical seasonally wet or flooded lowland grassland, swamps, and pastureland.

== Description ==
The eastern harvest mouse is characterized by brown pelage with a dark lateral line extending along its dorsal surface. The underbelly and ventral side of the tail are lighter colored than the rest of the body. The underbelly is a gray color that may be infused with some red character. The tail is bicolored with a dark brown coloration on the dorsal side and a white-gray coloration on ventral side. Females weigh more than males with increases in female weight being concordant with reproduction. They vary in length from 107–128 millimetres (4.2–5.0 in). The eastern harvest mouse is primarily nocturnal and has an average life span of 9.5 weeks.

== Habitat and distribution ==
The range of the eastern harvest mouse is wide across the North American continent. They are known to occur north to Maryland, south to the tip of Florida and as far west as Texas, Oklahoma and Ohio. They may have been extirpated from Maryland and West Virginia, however. They are found in open grassy areas such as abandoned fields, marshes or wet meadows. This species does not live in the forest and builds nests that it lives in year round. The nests are composed of dry weeds, grass or other plant material and are globular shaped. The home range of this species is estimated slightly below 1,000 square metres (0.25 acres).

== Diet ==
The eastern harvest mouse diet is not well known. In laboratories, they feed on a variety of items from seeds to fruits and vegetables. It is believed that in the wild, these mice feed solely on seeds, weeds and small insects.

== Reproduction ==
The eastern harvest mouse mates during spring and autumn. The males are always prepared to mate while the females will not mate during the summer period. The gestation period for pregnant females is ~21 days and they only need as little as 24 days to begin reproducing again. The litter size is usually between two and four offspring, however, it can range from one to eight offspring. Female parents raise the offspring. The young will leave the mother after 30 days. At birth, the young will weigh 1.2 g and will have closed eyes for the first 7–10 days.

=== Development ===
Immediately after birth, the young do not have fur and their eyes are closed. During the first thirty days, the pelage grows, the young gain weight and the eyes open. The fastest growth period is the first week after birth. They will leave the protection of the nest by the second or third week of development. The offspring nurse until four weeks of age. After thirty days, the young will leave the nest after they weigh enough.
