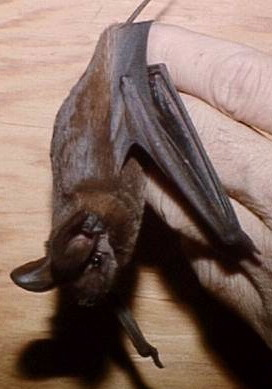

Conservation status
- Least Concern (IUCN 3.1)

Scientific classification
- Kingdom: Animalia
- Phylum: Chordata
- Class: Mammalia
- Order: Chiroptera
- Family: Molossidae
- Genus: Nyctinomops
- Species: N. macrotis

Binomial name
- Nyctinomops macrotis (Gray, 1839)

Synonyms
- Nyctinomus macrotis Gray, 1839

= Big free-tailed bat =

Species of bat

The big free-tailed bat (Nyctinomops macrotis) is a bat species found in the Americas.

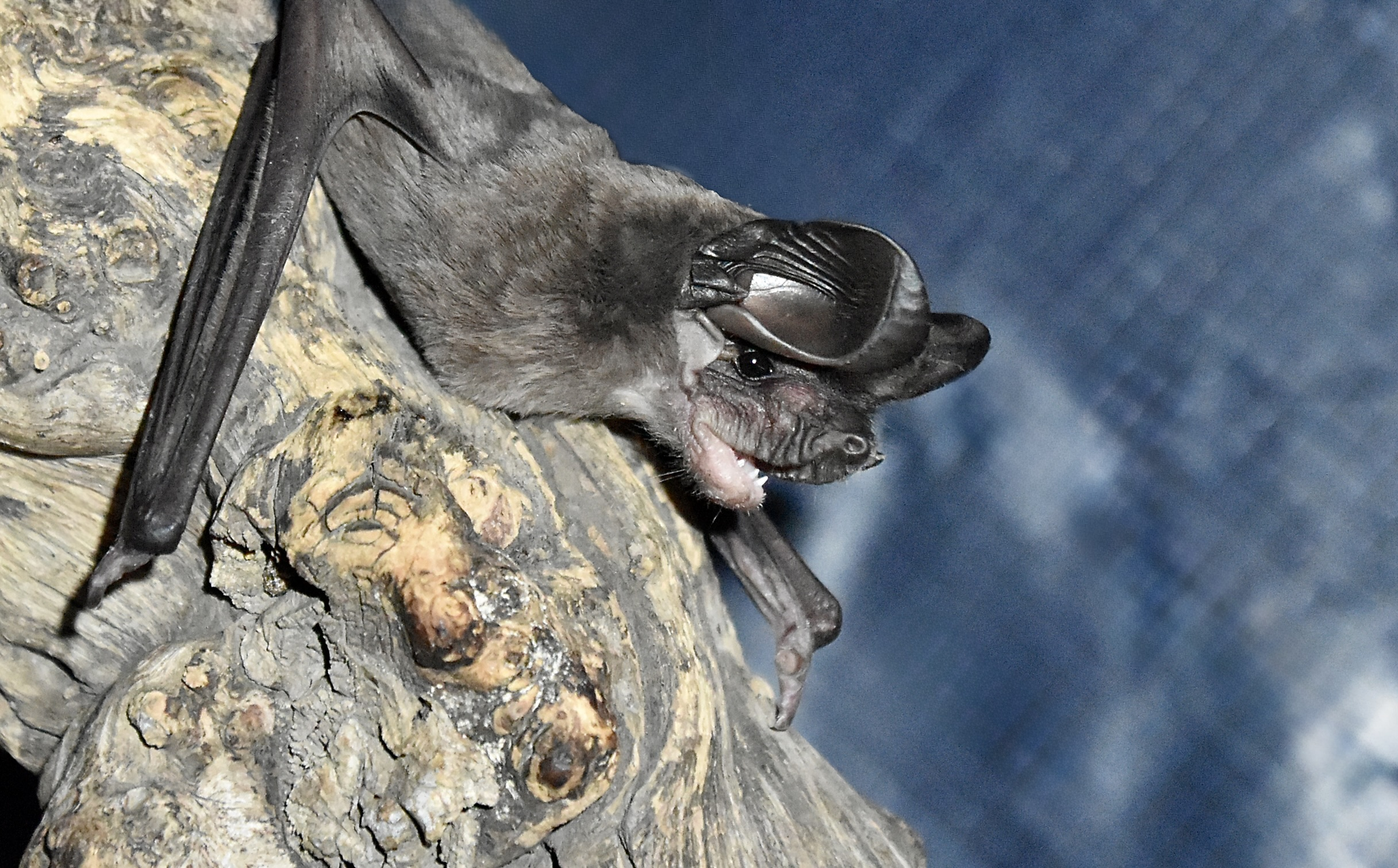
At a bat rescue center in Arizona.

== Taxonomy ==
It was described as a new species in 1839 by British zoologist John Edward Gray. Gray placed it in the now-defunct genus Nyctinomus, with a binomial of Nyctinomus macrotis. The holotype had been collected in Cuba by William Sharp Macleay.

== Description ==
It is the largest member of Nyctinomops, with an average forearm length of 60 mm (2.4 in). Individuals weigh approximately 20.6 g (0.73 oz). It has a wingspan of 417–436 mm (16.4–17.2 in). Its fur is glossy and variable in color, ranging from pale, reddish brown to dark brown or blackish. Its dental formula is 1.1.2.32.1.2.3 for a total of 30 teeth.

== Biology and ecology ==
Based on its wing morphology, it likely has a rapid flight. Its flight speed could exceed 40 km/h (25 mph).

== Range and habitat ==
Its range includes many countries in North, Central, and South America, including: Argentina, Brazil, Canada, Colombia, Cuba, the Dominican Republic, Ecuador, French Guiana, Guyana, Haiti, Jamaica, Mexico, Suriname, the United States, and Venezuela. It is possibly also found in Uruguay. The individuals documented in Canada and the U.S. states of Iowa and Kansas are considered vagrants or extralimital records. However, the species occurs as a non-vagrant in the U.S. states of Texas, California, Nevada, and Utah. It has been documented at a range of elevations from sea level to 2,600 m (8,500 ft) above sea level.

== Conservation ==
As of 2015, it is evaluated as a least-concern species by the IUCN, which is its lowest conservation priority.
