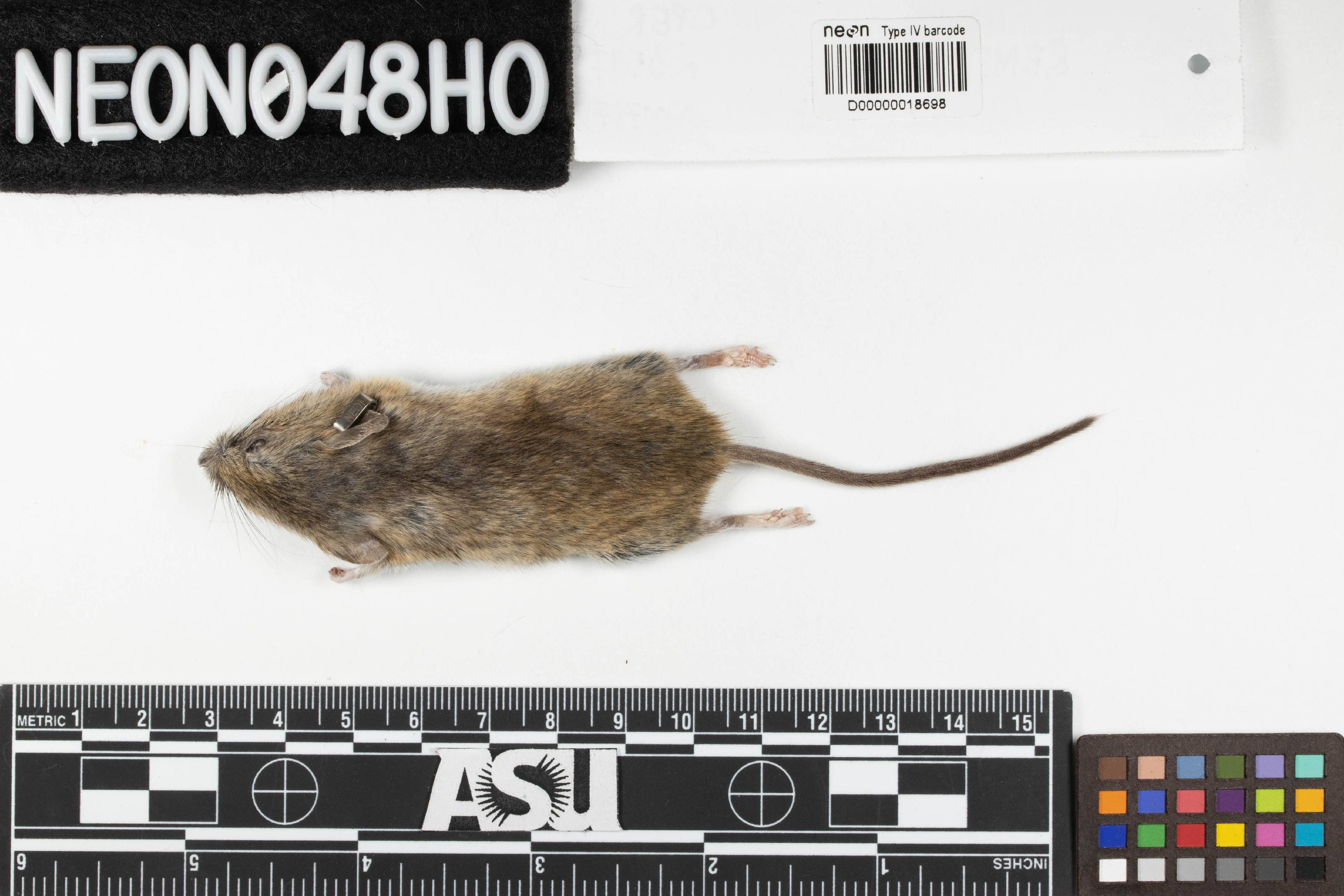

Conservation status
- Least Concern (IUCN 3.1)

Scientific classification
- Kingdom: Animalia
- Phylum: Chordata
- Class: Mammalia
- Order: Rodentia
- Family: Cricetidae
- Subfamily: Neotominae
- Genus: Reithrodontomys
- Species: R. montanus

Binomial name
- Reithrodontomys montanus (Baird, 1855)

Synonyms
- Reithrodon montanus (Baird, 1855); Reithrodontomys albescens Cary, 1903; Reithrodontomys griseus Bailey, 1905

= Plains harvest mouse =

Species of rodent

The plains harvest mouse (Reithrodontomys montanus) is a species of rodent in the family Cricetidae. It is found in northern Mexico and the central United States.

== Description ==
The dorsal part of the plains harvest mouse is grey with a darker grey mid-dorsal stripe, and the ventral part is whitish. Its tail has less and shorter hair, with the same color as the mid-dorsal stripe. The body length of the plains harvest mouse is 54 to 146 millimetres (2.1 to 5.7 in) total, and the tail is 20 to 69 millimetres (0.79 to 2.72 in) long. The body mass of a female plains harvest mouse is 7.5 to 13.5 grams (0.26 to 0.48 oz), slightly larger than the male at 6.5 to 10.8 grams (0.23 to 0.38 oz). Its hair length differs by season, being 11 mm–12 mm in winter, and 6 mm–7 mm in summer.

== Reproduction and growth ==
R. montanus reaches breeding age at 85 days. The gestation period is about 21 days, and the time between successive gestations is 21 to 27 days. The breeding period for R. montanus living in colder regions (Central United States) is during June to August while in warmer regions (Central America) R. montanus can breed in every month of the year. Lactation period of the female is every month but August to October.

Newborn plains harvest mice weigh about 1 g. It is born naked and blind. Its hair grows in 6 days, it opens its eyes at 8 days, and weaning is in 14 days. Reaching adult size takes 5 weeks. When it is juvenile, the fur is plain, sparse and curled like cotton. As a juvenile, the hair becomes more shiny, but less dense than the adult.

== Ecology ==
Since the food sources of the plains harvest mouse are mainly invertebrates and seeds, the mouse can be found in grassy fields or grazed prairie. Their nest is globular and has a dimension of 10 to 11 centimetres (3.9 to 4.3 in). It is formed of compacted grasses and has one opening. Sex ratio in their habitat is almost 1:1.

Their main predator is still not identified, but most carnivorous mammals, some reptiles, and amphibians are predators of the mouse.
