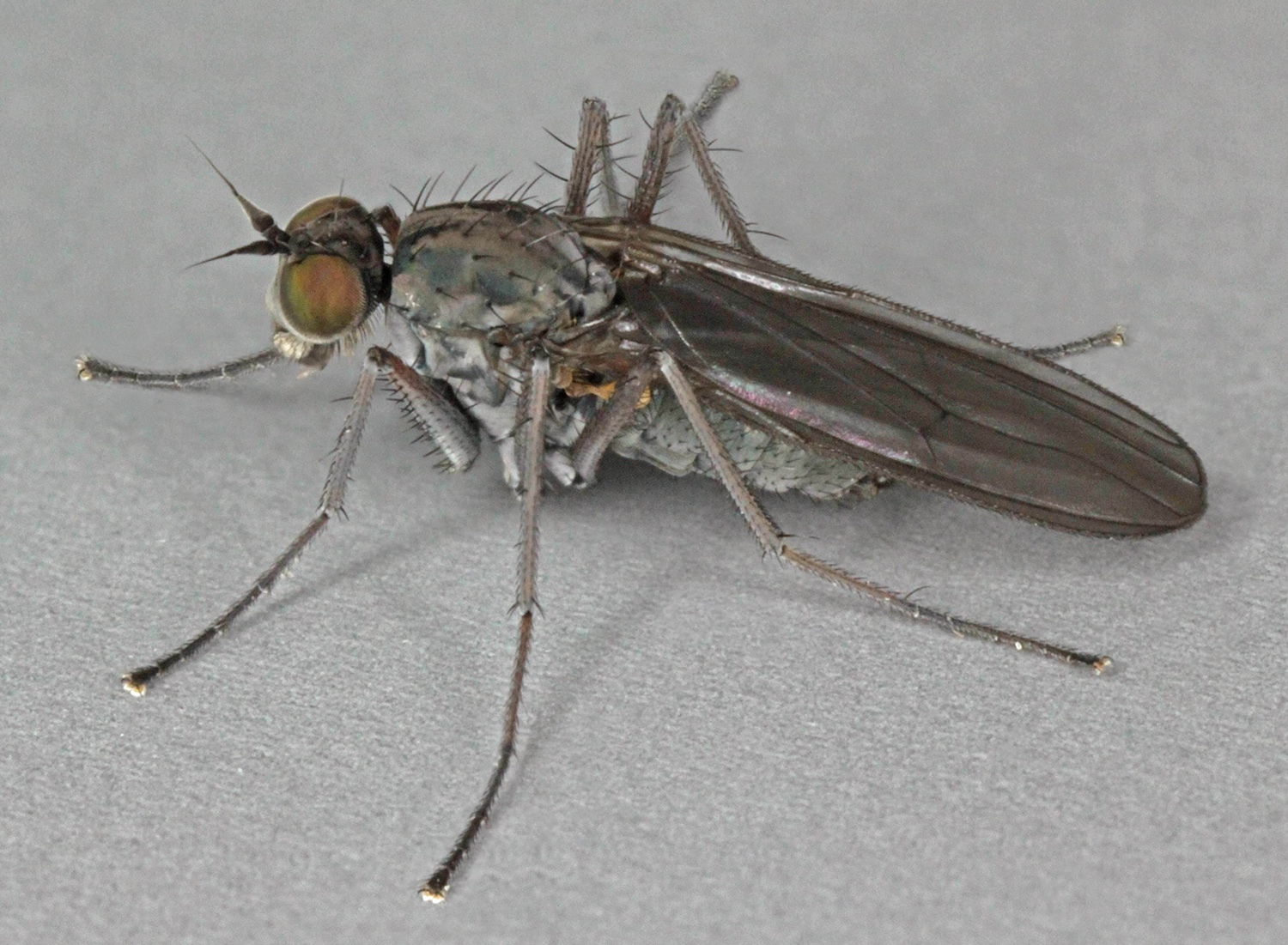
- Aphrosylus celtiber North Wales

Scientific classification
- Kingdom: Animalia
- Phylum: Arthropoda
- Clade: Pancrustacea
- Class: Insecta
- Order: Diptera
- Family: Dolichopodidae
- Subfamily: Hydrophorinae
- Tribe: Aphrosylini
- Genus: Aphrosylus; Haliday in Walker, 1851

Type species
- Aphrosylus raptor Haliday in Walker, 1851

= Aphrosylus =

Genus of flies

Aphrosylus is a genus of flies in the family Dolichopodidae. All species are intertidal in habitat.

== Species ==
- Aphrosylus aculeatus Negrobov, 1979
- Aphrosylus aguellinus Vaillant, 1955
- Aphrosylus argyreatus Frey, 1945
- Aphrosylus atlanticus Dahl, 1960
- Aphrosylus beckeri Parent, 1927
- Aphrosylus calcarator Frey, 1945
- Aphrosylus canariensis Santos Abreu, 1929
- Aphrosylus celtiber Haliday, 1855
- Aphrosylus cilifemoratus Rampini, 1982
- Aphrosylus dytei Olejníček & Barták, 2004
- Aphrosylus ferox Haliday, 1851
- Aphrosylus fumipennis Van Duzee, 1924
- Aphrosylus fur Parent, 1928
- Aphrosylus fuscipennis Strobl, 1909
- Aphrosylus gioiellae Rampini & Munari, 1987
- Aphrosylus giordanii Rampini & Munari, 1987
- Aphrosylus jacquemini Vaillant, 1950
- Aphrosylus jucundus Becker, 1908
- Aphrosylus lindbergi Frey, 1958
- Aphrosylus madeirensis Frey, 1949
- Aphrosylus maroccanus Vaillant, 1955
- Aphrosylus mitis Verrall, 1912
- Aphrosylus occultus Becker, 1908
- Aphrosylus parcearmatus Parent, 1925
- Aphrosylus piscator Lichtwardt, 1902
- Aphrosylus raptor Haliday, 1851
- Aphrosylus rossii Rampini, 1982
- Aphrosylus salensis Grootaert & Van de Velde, 2019
- Aphrosylus schumanni Negrobov, 1979
- Aphrosylus temaranus Vaillant, 1955
- Aphrosylus tenuipes Van Duzee, 1924
- Aphrosylus venator Loew, 1857

Aphrosylus griseatus Curran, 1926 is a synonym of Cemocarus griseatus (Curran, 1926), the type species of Cemocarus.

The following species were moved to Paraphrosylus:

- Aphrosylus californicus Harmston, 1952
- Aphrosylus direptor Wheeler, 1897
- Aphrosylus grassator Wheeler, 1897
- Aphrosylus nigripennis Van Duzee, 1924
- Aphrosylus praedator Wheeler, 1897
- Aphrosylus wirthi Harmston, 1951

The following species were moved to Cymatopus:

- Aphrosylus setosus Curran, 1932
