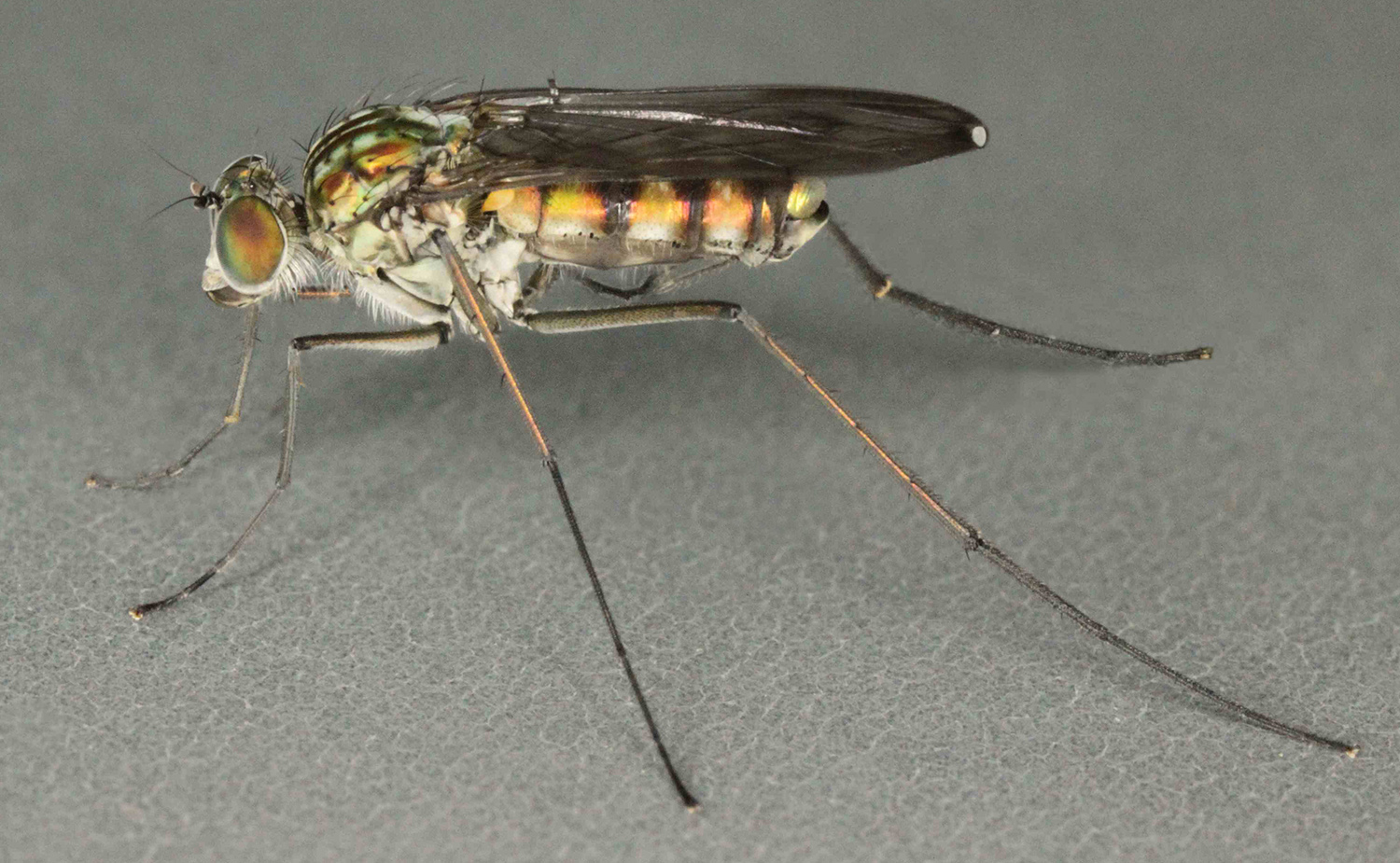
- Lianculus virens

Scientific classification
- Kingdom: Animalia
- Phylum: Arthropoda
- Clade: Pancrustacea
- Class: Insecta
- Order: Diptera
- Family: Dolichopodidae
- Subfamily: Hydrophorinae
- Tribe: Hydrophorini
- Genus: Liancalus; Loew, 1857

Type species
- Dolichopus regius (= Musca virens Scopoli, 1763) Fabricius, 1805

Synonyms
- Anoplomerus Rondani, 1856 (nec Guerin-Meneville, 1844); Anoplopus Rondani, 1857

= Liancalus =

Genus of flies

Liancalus is a genus of flies in the family Dolichopodidae. It contains at least 21 species distributed worldwide except in Australasia and Oceania. The genus includes some of the largest species in the family, with body length approaching 12 mm in some species.

== Nomenclature ==
Liancalus Loew, 1857 is a replacement name for Anoplomerus Rondani, 1856, which was preoccupied by a beetle genus. However, the name Liancalus is threatened by a change in type species of Anoplomerus from "Hydrophorus Regius Fabr." (now Liancalus virens (Scopoli, 1763)) to "Hydrophorus Notatus Meig." (now Scellus notatus (Fabricius, 1781)), made in an overlooked unpaginated corrigendum on the last page of Rondani, 1856, which would make Liancalus a synonym of Scellus. An application to the ICZN was made to conserve the names Liancalus and Scellus by designating Dolichopus regius Fabricius, 1805 as the type species of Anoplomerus. This was accepted by the ICZN in 2018.

== Species ==
- Liancalus adenensis Dyte, 1967
- Liancalus benedictus Becker, 1922
- Liancalus dytei Negrobov, Grootaert & Coulibaly, 1987
- Liancalus genualis Loew, 1861
- Liancalus glaucus Becker, 1908
- Liancalus hydrophilus Aldrich, 1893
- Liancalus lasius Wei & Liu, 1995
- Liancalus limbatus Van Duzee, 1917
- Liancalus lobatus Parent, 1932
- Liancalus maculosus Yang, 1998
- Liancalus peringueyi Curran, 1926
- Liancalus pterodactyl Runyon & Hurley, 2015
- Liancalus quadrisetus Dyte, 1967
- Liancalus querulus Osten Sacken, 1877
- Liancalus shandonganus Yang, 1998
- Liancalus similis Aldrich, 1893
- Liancalus sinensis Yang, 1998
- Liancalus sonorus Runyon & Hurley, 2015
- Liancalus vaillanti Dyte, 1967
- Liancalus virens (Scopoli, 1763)
- Liancalus zhenzhuristi Negrobov, 1979

The following are synonyms of other species:

- Liancalus decolor Parent, 1939: synonym of Liancalus peringueyi Curran, 1926
