= Hypocharassus pruinosus =

Scientific classification
- Kingdom: Animalia
- Phylum: Arthropoda
- Clade: Pancrustacea
- Class: Insecta
- Order: Diptera
- Family: Dolichopodidae
- Subfamily: Hydrophorinae
- Tribe: Hypocharassini
- Genus: Hypocharassus
- Species: H. pruinosus

Binomial name
- Hypocharassus pruinosus (Wheeler, 1898)

Synonyms
- Drepanomyia pruinosa Wheeler, 1898

Species of fly

Hypocharassus pruinosus is a species of fly in the family Dolichopodidae.

== Distribution ==
United States
