= Nelsonia =

Nelsonia may refer to:

- Nelsonia (rodent), a genus of Mexican rodents in the family Cricetidae
- Nelsonia (plant), a plant genus in the family Acanthaceae
- Nelsonia, a synonym of Abatetia, a genus of flies in the family Dolichopodidae
- Paleonelsonia, a trilobite genus formerly known as Nelsonia
- Nelsonia, New Zealand, a geographical area covering the northern South Island of New Zealand
- Nelsonia, Virginia, an unincorporated community in Virginia
- 3538 Nelsonia, an asteroid
