= Acymatopus =

Scientific classification
- Kingdom: Animalia
- Phylum: Arthropoda
- Clade: Pancrustacea
- Class: Insecta
- Order: Diptera
- Family: Dolichopodidae
- Subfamily: Hydrophorinae
- Tribe: Aphrosylini
- Genus: Acymatopus; Takagi, 1965

Type species
- Acymatopus major Takagi, 1965

Genus of flies

Acymatopus is a genus of flies in the family Dolichopodidae. It is distributed in Japan and China, and lives exclusively on marine coasts. It is similar in appearance to the genus Conchopus, which is also found in marine coasts.

== Species ==
There are six known species in the genus:

- Acymatopus femoralis Takagi, 1965 – Japan (Shikoku and Kyushu)
- Acymatopus longisetosus Takagi, 1965 – Japan (along the Pacific coast of eastern Honshu)
- Acymatopus major Takagi, 1965 – Japan (along the eastern shore of the Kii Peninsula and the Pacific coast of Kyushu)
- Acymatopus minor Takagi, 1965 – Japan (widely distributed, except for areas along the Pacific coast of northern Honshu)
- Acymatopus oxycercus Masunaga, Saigusa & Yang, 2005 – Japan (Chiba Prefecture and Shizuoka Prefecture)
- Acymatopus takeishii Masunaga, Saigusa & Yang, 2005 – Northeast China (Dalian)
