= Hydrophorus philombrius =

Scientific classification
- Kingdom: Animalia
- Phylum: Arthropoda
- Clade: Pancrustacea
- Class: Insecta
- Order: Diptera
- Family: Dolichopodidae
- Subfamily: Hydrophorinae
- Tribe: Hydrophorini
- Genus: Hydrophorus
- Species: H. philombrius

Binomial name
- Hydrophorus philombrius Wheeler, 1890

Species of fly

Hydrophorus philombrius is a species of brachyceran flies in the family of Dolichopodidae. The scientific name of the species was first published in 1890 by William Morton Wheeler.
