= Hypocharassus gladiator =

Scientific classification
- Kingdom: Animalia
- Phylum: Arthropoda
- Clade: Pancrustacea
- Class: Insecta
- Order: Diptera
- Family: Dolichopodidae
- Subfamily: Hydrophorinae
- Tribe: Hypocharassini
- Genus: Hypocharassus
- Species: H. gladiator

Binomial name
- Hypocharassus gladiator Mik, 1879

Synonyms
- Drepanomyia johnsonii Wheeler, 1898

Species of fly

Hypocharassus gladiator is a species of fly in the family Dolichopodidae.

== Distribution ==
United States
