= Machaerium =

Machaerium is the scientific name of two genera of organisms and may refer to:

- Machaerium (fly), a genus of insects in the family Dolichopodidae
- Machaerium (plant), a genus of plants in the family Fabaceae
