= Crematogaster arizonensis =

Scientific classification
- Kingdom: Animalia
- Phylum: Arthropoda
- Class: Insecta
- Order: Hymenoptera
- Family: Formicidae
- Subfamily: Myrmicinae
- Genus: Crematogaster
- Species: C. arizonensis

Binomial name
- Crematogaster arizonensis Wheeler, 1908

Species of ant

Crematogaster arizonensis is a species of ant in tribe Crematogastrini. It was described by Wheeler in 1908.
