= Thambemyia =

Scientific classification
- Kingdom: Animalia
- Phylum: Arthropoda
- Class: Insecta
- Order: Diptera
- Family: Dolichopodidae
- Subfamily: Hydrophorinae
- Tribe: Aphrosylini
- Genus: Thambemyia; Oldroyd, 1956

Type species
- Thambemyia pagdeni Oldroyd, 1956

Synonyms
- ?Conchopus Takagi, 1965 (disputed)

Genus of flies

Thambemyia is a genus of flies in the family Dolichopodidae. It known from the Oriental and Neotropical realms, with a single Palearctic species from Japan. Members of the genus live exclusively in the intertidal zone of rocky shores. Conchopus is sometimes considered a synonym of Thambemyia, but the former is considered a valid genus by some authors.

== Species ==
Subgenus Thambemyia Oldroyd, 1956:

- Thambemyia bisetosa Masunaga, Saigusa & Grootaert, 2005 – China (Hong Kong/Lantau Island)
- Thambemyia bruneiensis Masunaga, Saigusa & Grootaert, 2005 – Brunei
- Thambemyia fusariae Capellari, 2015 – Brazil (Bahia)
- Thambemyia hui Masunaga, Saigusa & Grootaert, 2005 – China (Fujian), Taiwan
- Thambemyia lopatini Grichanov, 2013 – India (Gujarat)
- Thambemyia pagdeni Oldroyd, 1956 – Malaysia (Penang Island), Thailand (Phuket Island)

Subgenus Prothambemyia Masunaga, Saigusa & Grootaert, 2005:

- Thambemyia japonica Masunaga, Saigusa & Grootaert, 2005 – Japan (Shikoku, Kyushu)

If Conchopus is a synonym of Thambemyia, the following species would also be included in the genus:

- Thambemyia abdominalis (Takagi, 1965)
- Thambemyia acrosticalis (Parent, 1937)
- Thambemyia anomalopus (Takagi, 1965)
- Thambemyia borealis (Takagi, 1965)
- Thambemyia convergens (Takagi, 1965)
- Thambemyia corvus (Takagi, 1965)
- Thambemyia mammuthus (Takagi, 1965)
- Thambemyia nodulata (Takagi, 1965)
- Thambemyia poseidonia (Takagi, 1965)
- Thambemyia pudica (Takagi, 1965)
- Thambemyia recta (Takagi, 1965)
- Thambemyia saigusai (Takagi, 1965)
- Thambemyia shandongensis Zhu, Yang & Masunaga, 2005
- Thambemyia sigmigra (Takagi, 1965)
- Thambemyia signata (Takagi, 1965)
- Thambemyia sikokiana (Takagi, 1965)
- Thambemyia sinuata (Takagi, 1965)
- Thambemyia taivanensis (Takagi, 1967)
- Thambemyia uvasima (Takagi, 1965)
