= Thinophilus prasinus =

Scientific classification
- Kingdom: Animalia
- Phylum: Arthropoda
- Clade: Pancrustacea
- Class: Insecta
- Order: Diptera
- Family: Dolichopodidae
- Subfamily: Hydrophorinae
- Tribe: Thinophilini
- Genus: Thinophilus
- Species: T. prasinus

Binomial name
- Thinophilus prasinus Johnson, 1921

Species of fly

Thinophilus prasinus is a species of long-legged fly in the family Dolichopodidae.
