= Hypocharassus =

Scientific classification
- Kingdom: Animalia
- Phylum: Arthropoda
- Clade: Pancrustacea
- Class: Insecta
- Order: Diptera
- Family: Dolichopodidae
- Subfamily: Hydrophorinae
- Tribe: Hypocharassini; Negrobov, 1981
- Genus: Hypocharassus; Mik, 1879

Type species
- Hypocharassus gladiator Mik, 1879

Synonyms
- Drepanomyia Wheeler, 1898

Genus of flies

Hypocharassus is a genus of flies in the family Dolichopodidae. In some classifications of the subfamily Hydrophorinae, the genus is the only member of the tribe Hypocharassini.

== Species ==
- Hypocharassus cavitarsus Kim & Suh, 2022 – Korea
- Hypocharassus farinosus Becker, 1922 – Taiwan
- Hypocharassus gladiator Mik, 1878 – south-eastern USA
- Hypocharassus pruinosus (Wheeler, 1898) – eastern USA
- Hypocharassus sinensis Yang, 1998 – southern China
