= Neal A. Weber =

American myrmecologist (1908–2001)

- Born: Cornelius Albert Weber; December 14, 1908; Towner, North Dakota, U.S.
- Died: January 21, 2001 (aged 92)
- Education: University of North Dakota (AB, MS); Harvard University (AM, PhD)
- Occupation: Myrmecologist
- Spouse: Jean Charlotte Jeffery (m. 1940)
- Children: 2

Cornelius "Neal" Albert Weber (December 14, 1908, Towner, North Dakota – January 21, 2001) was an internationally known American myrmecologist, specializing in the fungus-growing ants (the attines).

== Biography ==
Weber graduated from the University of North Dakota with an A.B. in 1930 and an M.S. in 1932. He graduated from Harvard University with an A.M. in 1933, and with a Ph.D. in zoology in 1935. From 1936 to 1943, he was an associate professor of biology at the University of North Dakota; from 1943 to 1947, an associate professor of anatomy at the School of Medicine of the University of North Dakota. In the biology department of Swarthmore College, he was an associate professor from 1947 to 1957, and a full professor from 1958 to 1974, until his retirement from Swarthmore as professor emeritus. In 1975 he became an adjunct professor of biology at Florida State University.

Weber participated in several scientific expeditions in the 1930s: in the West Indies from 1933 to 1936 (concentrating on Trinidad from 1934 to 1936), the Orinoco Delta in 1935, British Guiana in 1936, Barro Colorado Island and Colombia in 1938, and Sudan, Uganda, and Kenya in 1939. In the late 1940s and early 1950s, he participated in several American Museum of Natural History expeditions: in central Africa in 1948, in the Middle East in 1950 and in 1952, and in tropical America in 1954. From 1950 to 1952 he was a visiting professor at the University of Baghdad. From 1958 to 1960 he was a member of the polar research team of the National Academy of Sciences. From 1960 to 1962 he served as a U.S. Department of State scientific attaché in Buenos Aires.

In addition to his research on the genus Atta, he also studied other ant genera, field zoology, zoogeography, arthropod vectors of diseases, and ecology. He corresponded with many notable entomologists, including Joseph Charles Bequaert, Horace Donisthorpe, Alfred E. Emerson, Caryl Parker Haskins, William M. Mann, Mary Talbot, George C. Wheeler, and William Morton Wheeler.

Weber was elected in 1944 a fellow of the Entomological Society of America. He was elected in 1965 a fellow of the American Association for the Advancement of Science. His book Gardening Ants, the Attines won the 1973 John Frederick Lewis Award of the American Philosophical Society.

In 1940 he married Jean Charlotte Jeffery (1912–2000). They had a daughter and two sons.
