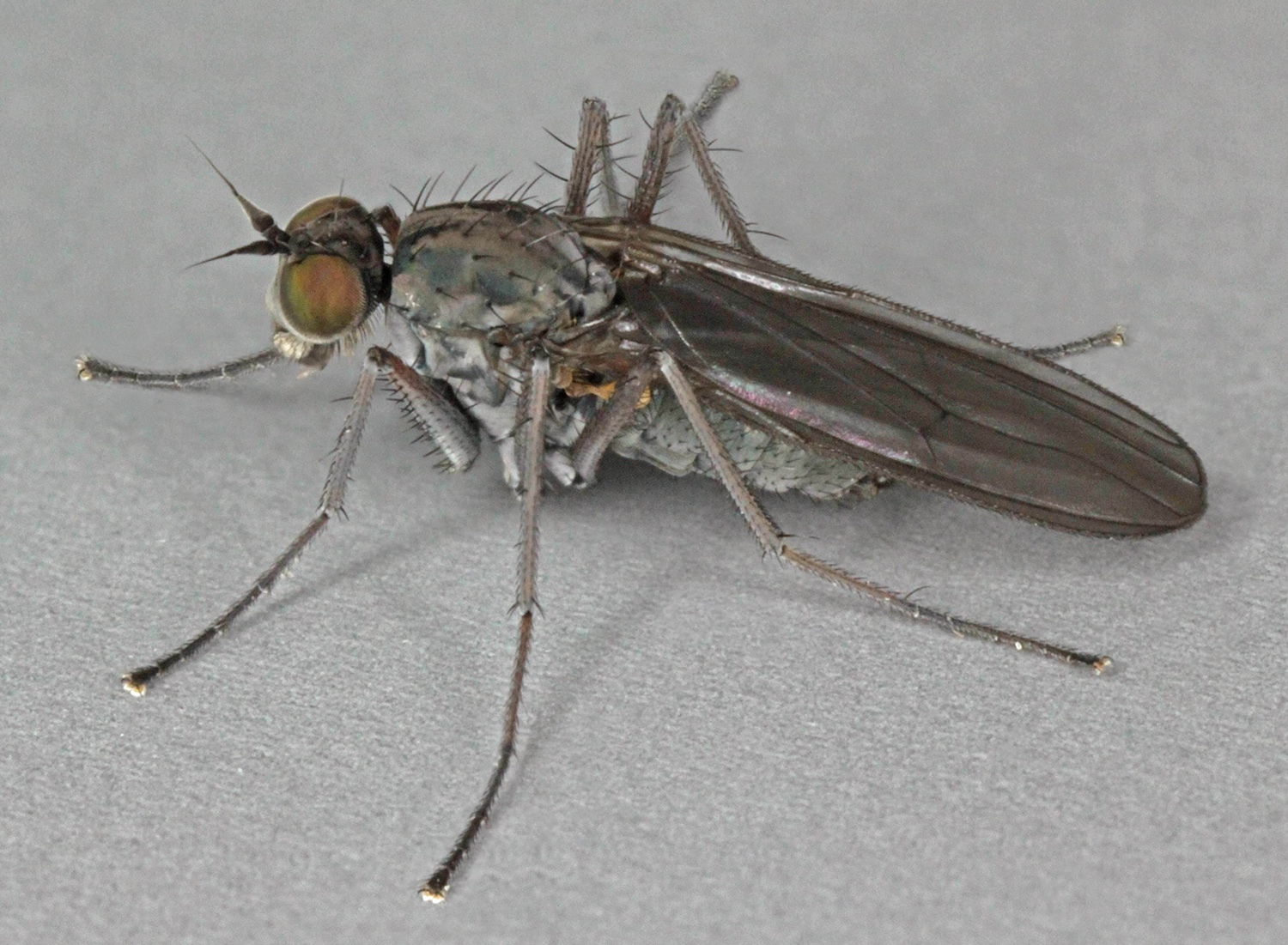
- Aphrosylus celtiber North Wales

Scientific classification
- Kingdom: Animalia
- Phylum: Arthropoda
- Clade: Pancrustacea
- Class: Insecta
- Order: Diptera
- Family: Dolichopodidae
- Subfamily: Hydrophorinae
- Tribe: Aphrosylini
- Genus: Aphrosylus
- Species: A. celtiber

Binomial name
- Aphrosylus celtiber Haliday, 1855

= Aphrosylus celtiber =

Species of fly

Aphrosylus celtiber is a species of fly in the family Dolichopodidae. It is distributed in Western Europe.
