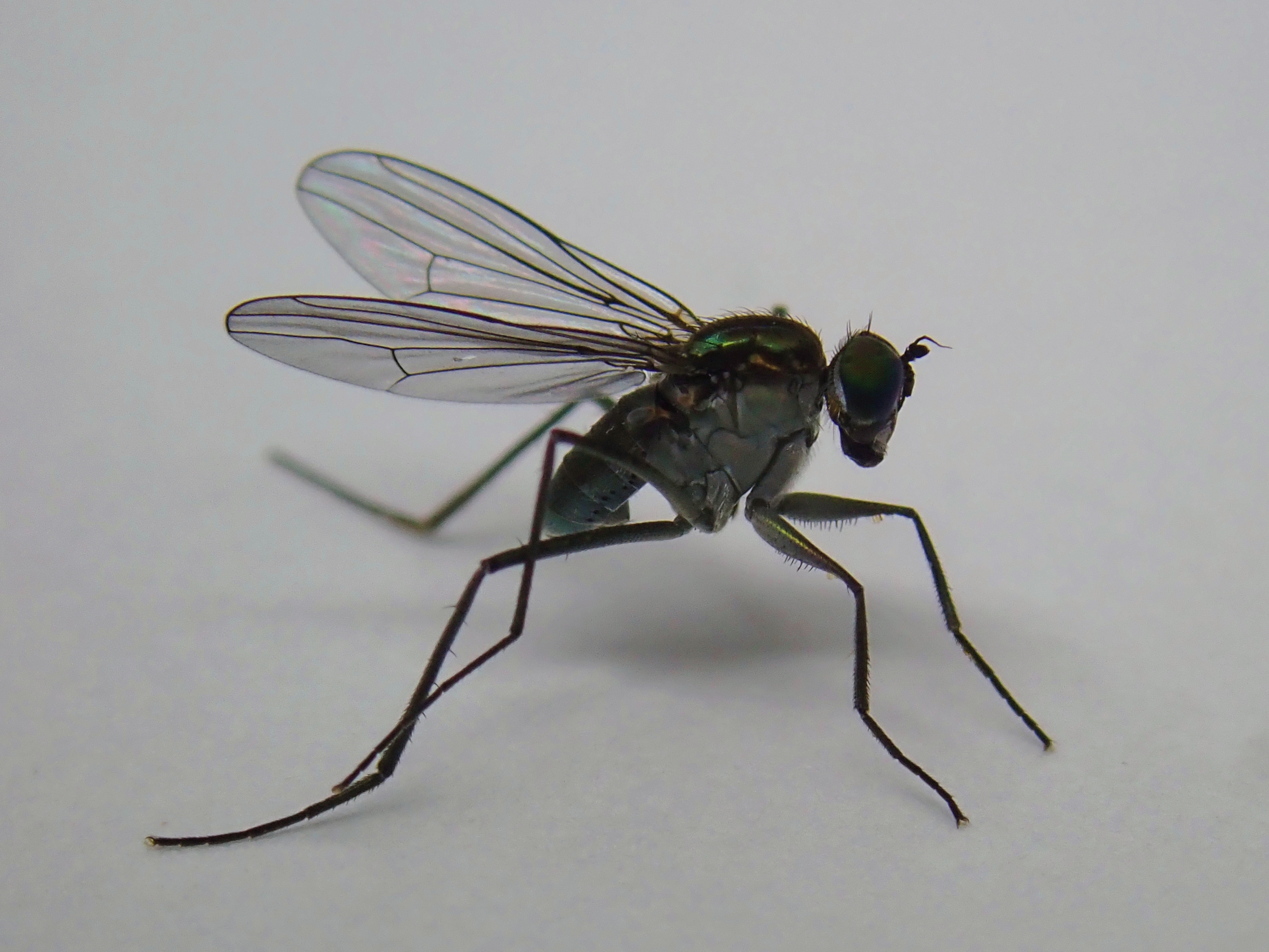
- Male Hydrophorus litoreus

Scientific classification
- Kingdom: Animalia
- Phylum: Arthropoda
- Clade: Pancrustacea
- Class: Insecta
- Order: Diptera
- Family: Dolichopodidae
- Subfamily: Hydrophorinae
- Tribe: Hydrophorini
- Genus: Hydrophorus
- Species: H. litoreus

Binomial name
- Hydrophorus litoreus Fallén, 1823

= Hydrophorus litoreus =

Species of fly

Hydrophorus litoreus is a species of fly in the family of Dolichopodidae.
