= Paraphrosylus =

Scientific classification
- Kingdom: Animalia
- Phylum: Arthropoda
- Clade: Pancrustacea
- Class: Insecta
- Order: Diptera
- Family: Dolichopodidae
- Subfamily: Hydrophorinae
- Tribe: Aphrosylini
- Genus: Paraphrosylus; Becker, 1922

Type species
- Aphrosylus praedator Wheeler, 1897

Genus of flies

Paraphrosylus is a genus of flies in the family Dolichopodidae. It is distributed along rocky coasts of the Eastern Pacific, and members of the genus live in the intertidal zone. Paraphrosylus was originally established as a subgenus of Aphrosylus, but was later raised to genus rank.

== Species ==
- Paraphrosylus californicus (Harmston, 1952) – California (Laguna)
- Paraphrosylus direptor (Wheeler, 1897) – British Columbia, Washington, California
- Paraphrosylus grassator (Wheeler, 1897) – California (Pacific Grove)
- Paraphrosylus nigripennis (Van Duzee, 1924) – Alaska, Washington, Oregon
- Paraphrosylus praedator (Wheeler, 1897) – British Columbia, Washington, California
- Paraphrosylus wirthi (Harmston, 1951) – California (Moss Beach)
