= Liancalus genualis =

Scientific classification
- Kingdom: Animalia
- Phylum: Arthropoda
- Clade: Pancrustacea
- Class: Insecta
- Order: Diptera
- Family: Dolichopodidae
- Subfamily: Hydrophorinae
- Tribe: Hydrophorini
- Genus: Liancalus
- Species: L. genualis

Binomial name
- Liancalus genualis Loew, 1861

Species of fly

Liancalus genualis is a species of long-legged fly in the family Dolichopodidae. It is the only species in the genus Liancalus known to occur in eastern North America.
