= Oedematopiella =

Scientific classification
- Kingdom: Animalia
- Phylum: Arthropoda
- Clade: Pancrustacea
- Class: Insecta
- Order: Diptera
- Family: Dolichopodidae
- Subfamily: Hydrophorinae
- Tribe: Hydrophorini
- Genus: Oedematopiella; Naglis, 2011

Type species
- Oedematopiella sarae Naglis, 2011

Genus of flies

Oedematopiella is a genus of flies belonging to the family Dolichopodidae. It was established in 2011 for two species from Costa Rica, Oedematopiella sarae and Oedematopiella nathaliae. It is related to the genus Oedematopus.
