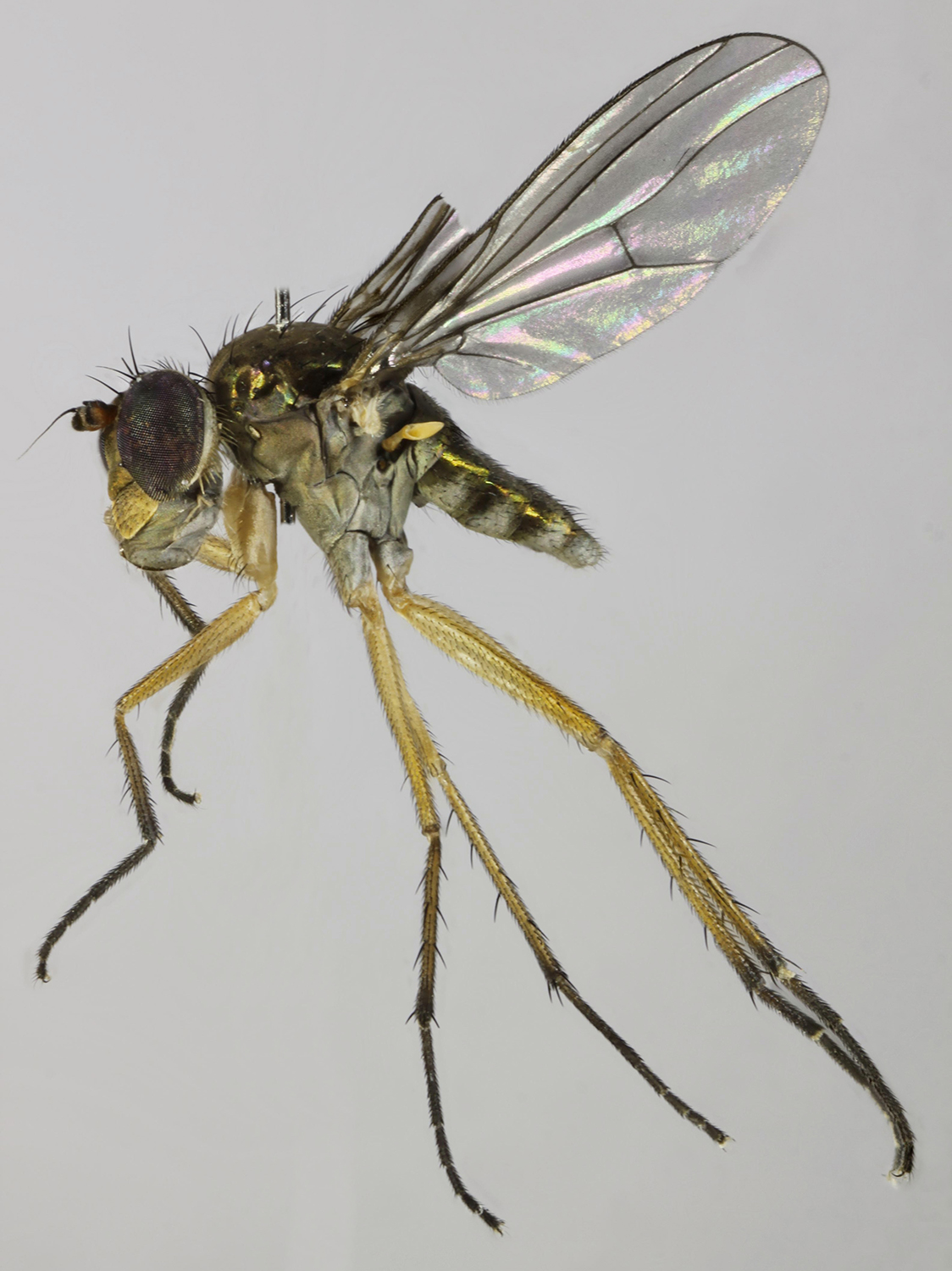
- Thinophilus ruficornis North Wales

Scientific classification
- Kingdom: Animalia
- Phylum: Arthropoda
- Clade: Pancrustacea
- Class: Insecta
- Order: Diptera
- Family: Dolichopodidae
- Subfamily: Hydrophorinae
- Tribe: Thinophilini
- Genus: Thinophilus
- Species: T. ruficornis

Binomial name
- Thinophilus ruficornis (Haliday, 1838 in Curtis)

Synonyms
- Medeterus ruficornis Haliday, 1838 in Curtis; Rhaphium maculicorne Zetterstedt, 1843

= Thinophilus ruficornis =

Species of fly

Thinophilus ruficornis is a species of fly in the family Dolichopodidae. It is found in the Palearctic.
