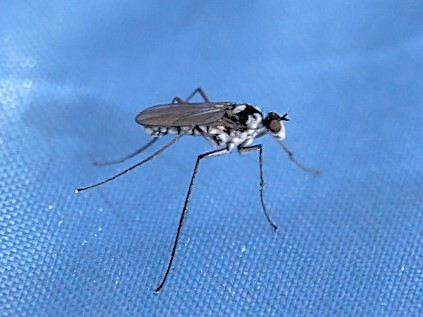
- Conchopus borealis

Scientific classification
- Kingdom: Animalia
- Phylum: Arthropoda
- Clade: Pancrustacea
- Class: Insecta
- Order: Diptera
- Family: Dolichopodidae
- Subfamily: Hydrophorinae
- Tribe: Aphrosylini
- Genus: Conchopus; Takagi, 1965

Type species
- Conchopus rectus Takagi, 1965

= Conchopus =

Genus of flies

Conchopus is a genus of flies in the family Dolichopodidae. Species of the genus are found in Japan, China, Taiwan, the Hawaiian Islands, and Wake Island. The species Conchopus borealis is also an introduced species in North America and South America. Members of the genus live exclusively in the intertidal zone of rocky shores. The genus is sometimes considered a synonym of Thambemyia, but is considered a valid genus by some authors.

== Taxonomy and species ==
Takagi (1965) originally divided the genus into seven species groups. According to Masunaga et al. (2005) and Masunaga & Saigusa (2010), the genus can be divided into two clades: one containing the rectus species group (including the type species), and the other containing all other species groups, for which the authors intended to propose a new genus. The latter clade they also consider to be the sister group of Thambemyia.

rectus species group (= Conchopus sensu stricto):

- Conchopus acrosticalis (Parent, 1937) – Hawai‘i, Maui, Lāna‘i, Moloka‘i
- Conchopus borealis Takagi, 1965 – Japan, North America (introduced), Peru (introduced)
- Conchopus ciliatus Masunaga & Saigusa, 2010 – Hawai‘i, Maui, O‘ahu, Lisianski
- Conchopus crassinervis Masunaga & Saigusa, 2010 – Kaua‘i
- Conchopus menehune Masunaga & Saigusa, 2010 – Kaua‘i, Nihoa
- Conchopus minutus Masunaga & Saigusa, 2010 – Hawai‘i, Maui, Lāna‘i, Moloka‘i, O‘ahu, French Frigate Shoals
- Conchopus pacificus Masunaga & Saigusa, 2010 – Hawai‘i, O‘ahu, Kaua‘i, Wake
- Conchopus pudicus Takagi, 1965 – Japan
- Conchopus rectus Takagi, 1965 – Japan, China
- Conchopus sikokianus Takagi, 1965 – Japan
- Conchopus taivanensis Takagi, 1967 – Japan, Taiwan

sinuatus species group:

- Conchopus corvus Takagi, 1965
- Conchopus sinuatus Takagi, 1965

sigmiger species group:

- Conchopus saigusai Takagi, 1965
- Conchopus sigmiger Takagi, 1965
- Conchopus uvasima Takagi, 1965

convergens species group:

- Conchopus convergens Takagi, 1965
- Conchopus poseidonius Takagi, 1965
- Conchopus signatus Takagi, 1965

nodulatus species group:

- Conchopus nodulatus Takagi, 1965
- Conchopus mammuthus Takagi, 1965

anomalopus species group:

- Conchopus anomalopus Takagi, 1965

abdominalis species group:

- Conchopus abdominalis Takagi, 1965

Other species:

- Conchopus shandongensis (Zhu, Yang & Masunaga, 2005)
