= Crematogaster agnita =

Scientific classification
- Kingdom: Animalia
- Phylum: Arthropoda
- Class: Insecta
- Order: Hymenoptera
- Family: Formicidae
- Subfamily: Myrmicinae
- Genus: Crematogaster
- Species: C. agnita

Binomial name
- Crematogaster agnita Wheeler, 1934

Species of ant

Crematogaster agnita is a species of ant in tribe Crematogastrini. It was described by Wheeler in 1934.
