= Liancalus querulus =

Scientific classification
- Kingdom: Animalia
- Phylum: Arthropoda
- Clade: Pancrustacea
- Class: Insecta
- Order: Diptera
- Family: Dolichopodidae
- Subfamily: Hydrophorinae
- Tribe: Hydrophorini
- Genus: Liancalus
- Species: L. querulus

Binomial name
- Liancalus querulus Osten Sacken, 1877

Species of fly

Liancalus querulus is a species of long-legged fly in the family Dolichopodidae.
