= Scellus crinipes =

Scientific classification
- Kingdom: Animalia
- Phylum: Arthropoda
- Class: Insecta
- Order: Diptera
- Family: Dolichopodidae
- Subfamily: Hydrophorinae
- Tribe: Hydrophorini
- Genus: Scellus
- Species: S. crinipes

Binomial name
- Scellus crinipes Van Duzee, 1925

Species of fly

Scellus crinipes is a species of Brachycera in the family of long-legged flies.
