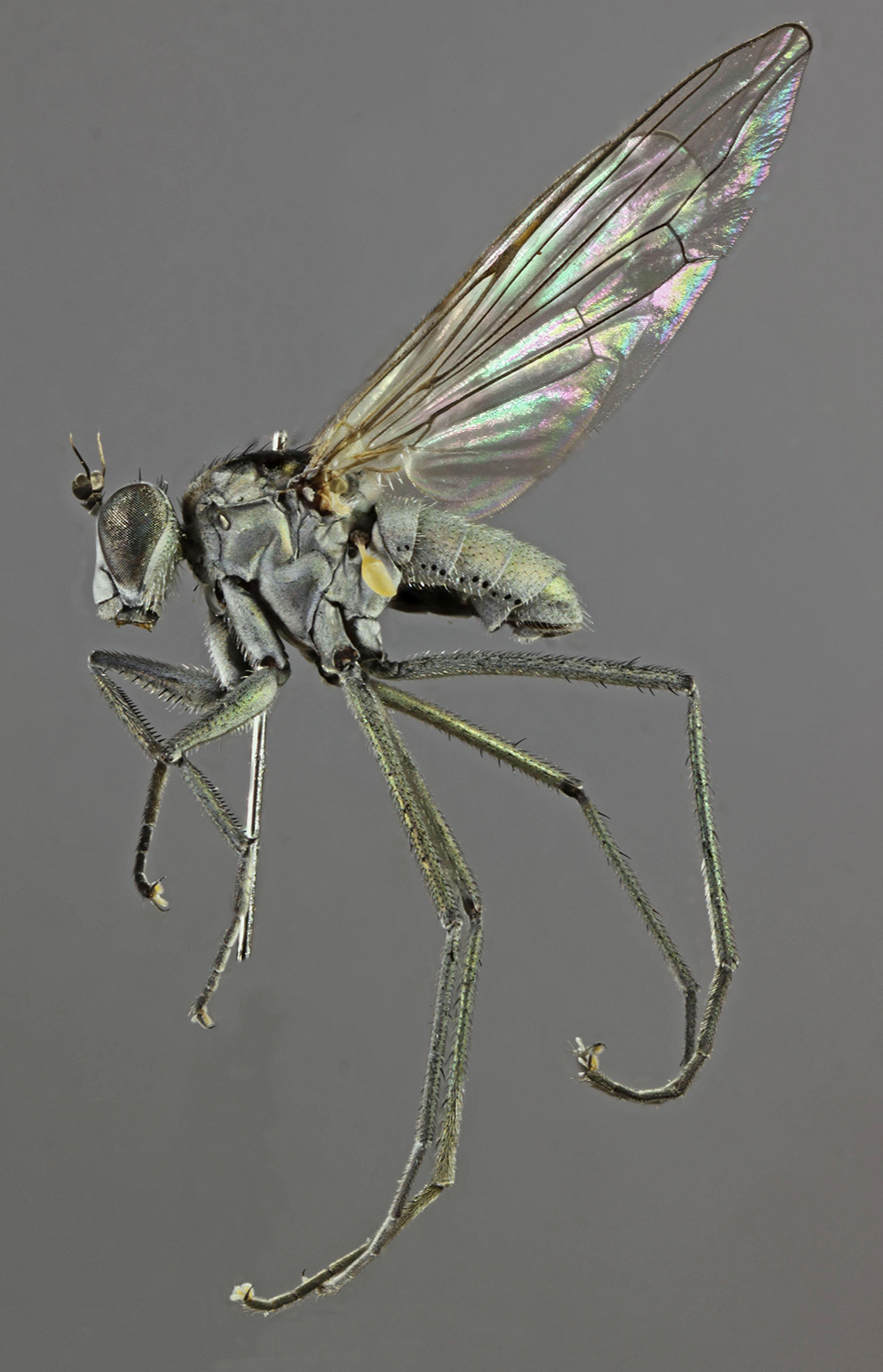
- Hydrophorus praecox North Wales

Scientific classification
- Kingdom: Animalia
- Phylum: Arthropoda
- Clade: Pancrustacea
- Class: Insecta
- Order: Diptera
- Family: Dolichopodidae
- Subfamily: Hydrophorinae
- Tribe: Hydrophorini
- Genus: Hydrophorus
- Species: H. praecox

Binomial name
- Hydrophorus praecox (Lehmann, 1822)

= Hydrophorus praecox =

Species of fly

Hydrophorus praecox is a species of fly in the family Dolichopodidae. It is found in the Palearctic.
