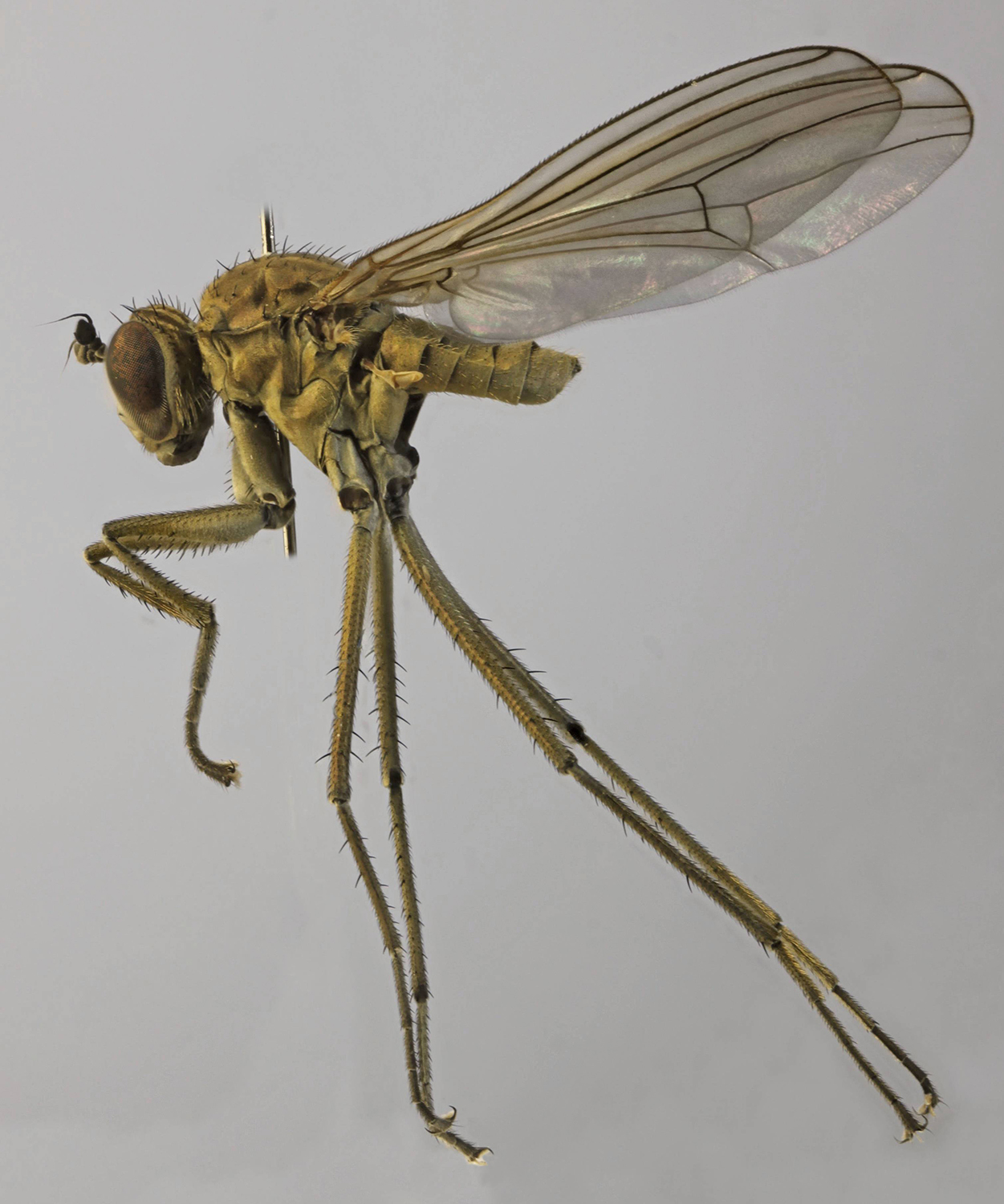
- Hydrophorus oceanus female

Scientific classification
- Kingdom: Animalia
- Phylum: Arthropoda
- Clade: Pancrustacea
- Class: Insecta
- Order: Diptera
- Family: Dolichopodidae
- Subfamily: Hydrophorinae
- Tribe: Hydrophorini
- Genus: Hydrophorus
- Species: H. oceanus

Binomial name
- Hydrophorus oceanus (Macquart, 1838)

Synonyms
- Medeterus oceanus Macquart, 1838; Hydrophorus inaequalipes Haliday, 1851; Hydrophorus bisetus Loew, 1857

= Hydrophorus oceanus =

Species of fly

Hydrophorus oceanus is a species of fly in the family of Dolichopodidae. It is found in the Palearctic. For identification see
