= Hydrophorus =

- Hydrophorus nebulosus, North Wales

Scientific classification
- Domain: Eukaryota
- Kingdom: Animalia
- Phylum: Arthropoda
- Class: Insecta
- Order: Diptera
- Family: Dolichopodidae
- Subfamily: Hydrophorinae
- Tribe: Hydrophorini
- Genus: Hydrophorus; Fallén, 1823

Type species
- Hydrophorus nebulosus Fallén, 1823

Species
- see text

Synonyms
- Aphrozeta Perris, 1847; Parhydrophorus Wheeler, 1896; Glyphidocerus Enderlein, 1936

Genus of flies

Hydrophorus is a genus of flies in the family Dolichopodidae.

== Species ==
- Hydrophorus aestuum Loew, 1869
- Hydrophorus agalma Wheeler, 1899
- Hydrophorus albiceps Frey, 1915
- Hydrophorus alboflorens (Walker, 1849)
- Hydrophorus albopictus Parent, 1931
- Hydrophorus algens Wheeler, 1899
- Hydrophorus alpinus Wahlberg, 1844
- Hydrophorus altivagus Aldrich, 1911
- Hydrophorus amplectens Aldrich, 1911
- Hydrophorus ampullaceus Van Duzee, 1924
- Hydrophorus angustifacies Hurley, 1985
- Hydrophorus antarcticus Schiner, 1868
- Hydrophorus aquatilis Aldrich, 1922
- Hydrophorus arambourgi Parent, 1938
- Hydrophorus arcticus Negrobov, 1977
- Hydrophorus arnaudi Hurley, 1985
- Hydrophorus aureifacies Becker, 1914
- Hydrophorus baicalensis Negrobov, 1977
- Hydrophorus balticus (Meigen, 1824)
- Hydrophorus bipunctatus (Lehmann, 1822)
- Hydrophorus borealis Loew, 1857
- Hydrophorus bovatus Hurley, 1985
- Hydrophorus brachyclypeus Negrobov, 1977
- Hydrophorus brevicauda Van Duzee, 1923
- Hydrophorus breviseta (Thomson, 1869)
- Hydrophorus brunneifacies Negrobov, 1977
- Hydrophorus brunnicosus Loew, 1857
- Hydrophorus callosoma Frey, 1915
- Hydrophorus callostomus Loew, 1857
- Hydrophorus canescens (Wheeler, 1896)
- Hydrophorus canities Van Duzee, 1923
- Hydrophorus celestialis Takagi, 1972
- Hydrophorus chappuisi Parent, 1938
- Hydrophorus chrysologus (Walker, 1849)
- Hydrophorus cinipunctus Negrobov, 1975
- Hydrophorus claripennis Van Duzee, 1924
- Hydrophorus cognatus Parent, 1931
- Hydrophorus congoensis Vanschuytbroeck, 1951
- Hydrophorus diminuatus Becker, 1922
- Hydrophorus dioktes Hurley, 1985
- Hydrophorus dreisbachi Harmston & Knowlton, 1963
- Hydrophorus eldoradensis Wheeler, 1899
- Hydrophorus emeljanovi Negrobov, 1977
- Hydrophorus extrarius Aldrich, 1911
- Hydrophorus femoratus Parent, 1930
- Hydrophorus ferruginus Hurley, 1985
- Hydrophorus flavihirtus Van Duzee, 1923
- Hydrophorus flavipennis Van Duzee, 1926
- Hydrophorus freyi Stora, 1954
- Hydrophorus fumipennis Van Duzee, 1921
- Hydrophorus geminus Frey, 1915
- Hydrophorus glaber (Walker, 1849)
- Hydrophorus grisellus Becker, 1922
- Hydrophorus harmstoni Hurley, 1985
- Hydrophorus henanensis Zhu, Yang & Masunaga, 2006
- Hydrophorus hesperius Hurley, 1985
- Hydrophorus hirpicifer Hurley, 1985
- Hydrophorus hydrophylax Parent, 1939
- Hydrophorus incisicornis Speiser, 1910
- Hydrophorus innotatus Loew, 1864
- Hydrophorus irinae Negrobov, 1977
- Hydrophorus jeanneli Parent, 1938
- Hydrophorus kaznakowi Becker, 1907
- Hydrophorus kolensis Parent, 1934
- Hydrophorus laticornis Becker, 1922
- Hydrophorus litoreus Fallén, 1823
- Hydrophorus maculipennis Van Duzee, 1926
- Hydrophorus magdalenae Wheeler, 1899
- Hydrophorus manicatus Collin, 1935
- Hydrophorus mexicanus Hurley, 1985
- Hydrophorus minimus Van Duzee, 1924
- Hydrophorus myllomerus Hurley, 1985
- Hydrophorus nebulosus Fallén, 1823
- Hydrophorus nigrihalteratus Parent, 1930
- Hydrophorus nilicola Parent, 1927
- Hydrophorus norvegicus Ringdahl, 1928
- Hydrophorus oceanus (Macquart, 1838)
- Hydrophorus ochraceus Becker, 1914
- Hydrophorus pacificus Van Duzee, 1933
- Hydrophorus parvisetus Negrobov, 1977
- Hydrophorus parvus Loew, 1862
- Hydrophorus patagonicus Van Duzee, 1931
- Hydrophorus pectinatus Gerstäcker, 1864
- Hydrophorus pectinipes Van Duzee, 1923
- Hydrophorus pensus Aldrich, 1911
- Hydrophorus phaeopteryx Hurley, 1985
- Hydrophorus phalarus Hurley, 1985
- Hydrophorus philombrius Wheeler, 1890
- Hydrophorus phoca Aldrich, 1911
- Hydrophorus pilipes Frey, 1915
- Hydrophorus pilitarsis Malloch, 1919
- Hydrophorus plautus Hurley, 1985
- Hydrophorus polychaetus Yang, 1998
- Hydrophorus ponojensis Frey, 1915
- Hydrophorus praecox (Lehmann, 1822)
- Hydrophorus qinghaiensis Yang, 1998
- Hydrophorus regularis Becker, 1922
- Hydrophorus rhionopus Hurley, 1985
- Hydrophorus rogenhoferi Mik, 1874
- Hydrophorus rufibarbis Gerstäcker, 1864
- Hydrophorus rufinasutus Parent, 1925
- Hydrophorus signifer Coquillett, 1899
- Hydrophorus sodalis Wheeler, 1899
- Hydrophorus solitarius d'Andretta, 1952
- Hydrophorus spinicornis Loew, 1858
- Hydrophorus starkus Negrobov & Golubtzov, 2006
- Hydrophorus tibetanus Becker, 1917
- Hydrophorus titicaca Becker, 1922
- Hydrophorus trichaspis Hurley, 1985
- Hydrophorus variinasutus Vanschuytbroeck, 1951
- Hydrophorus viridifacies Van Duzee, 1923
- Hydrophorus viridis (Meigen, 1824)
- Hydrophorus williamsi Parent, 1938
- Hydrophorus zaitzevianus Negrobov, 1978

The following are synonyms of other species:

- Hydrophorus albosignatus Ringdahl, 1919: Synonym of Hydrophorus callosoma Frey, 1915
- Hydrophorus wahlgreni Frey, 1915: Synonym of Hydrophorus altivagus Aldrich, 1911
