= Diostracus =

Scientific classification
- Kingdom: Animalia
- Phylum: Arthropoda
- Class: Insecta
- Order: Diptera
- Family: Dolichopodidae
- Subfamily: Hydrophorinae
- Tribe: Hydrophorini
- Genus: Diostracus; Loew, 1861

Type species
- Diostracus prasinus Loew, 1861

Subgenera
- Lagodechia Negrobov & Zurikov, 1996; Ozmena Özdikmen, 2010; Sphyrotarsus Mik, 1874

Synonyms
- Asphyrotarsus Oldenberg, 1916; Takagia Negrobov, 1973 (nec Matsumura, 1942)

Genus of flies

Diostracus is a genus of flies in the family Dolichopodidae. It includes about 100 species described from the Nearctic, Palaearctic and Oriental realms. In 2013, it was expanded to include the former genera Lagodechia and Sphyrotarsus as subgenera.

== Species ==
Subgenus Diostracus Loew, 1861:

- Diostracus acutatus Wang, Wang & Yang, 2015
- Diostracus albuginosus Wei & Liu, 1996
- Diostracus alticola Saigusa, 1984
- Diostracus angustipalpis Saigusa, 1984
- Diostracus antennalis Takagi, 1968
- Diostracus aristalis Saigusa, 1995
- Diostracus aurifer Takagi, 1972
- Diostracus auripalpis Saigusa, 1984
- Diostracus auripilosus Saigusa, 1984
- Diostracus baiyunshanus Yang & Saigusa, 1999
- Diostracus bisinuatus Saigusa, 1995
- Diostracus brevabdominalis Zhu, Masunaga & Yang, 2007
- Diostracus brevicercus Yang & Saigusa, 2000
- Diostracus brevis Yang & Saigusa, 2000
- Diostracus burmanicus Saigusa, 1995
- Diostracus campsicnemoides Grichanov, 2015
- Diostracus chaetodactylus Saigusa, 1984
- Diostracus clavatus Zhu, Yang & Masunaga, 2007
- Diostracus concavus Zhu, Tang & Yang, 2023
- Diostracus dicercaeus Wei & Liu, 1996
- Diostracus digitiformis Yang & Saigusa, 2000
- Diostracus emeiensis Yang, 1998
- Diostracus emotoi Saigusa, 1984
- Diostracus fanjingshanensis Zhang, Yang & Masunaga, 2003
- Diostracus fasciatus Takagi, 1968
- Diostracus fasciculatus Zhu, Tang & Yang, 2023
- Diostracus femoratus Saigusa, 1984
- Diostracus fenestratus Saigusa, 1984
- Diostracus flavipes Takagi, 1968
- Diostracus flexus Takagi, 1972
- Diostracus fulvispinatus Saigusa, 1984
- Diostracus genualis Takagi, 1968
- Diostracus gymnoscutellatus Saigusa, 1984
- Diostracus henanus Yang, 1999
- Diostracus impulvillatus Saigusa, 1984
- Diostracus inornatus Takagi, 1968
- Diostracus janssonorum Saigusa, 1995
- Diostracus kimotoi Takagi, 1968
- Diostracus laetus Zhu, Tang & Yang, 2023
- Diostracus lamellatus Wei & Liu, 1996
- Diostracus latipennis Saigusa, 1995
- Diostracus lemavajulorum Pusch, 2015
- Diostracus leucostomus (Loew, 1861) (Synonym: D. nigripes Strobl, 1898)
- Diostracus lii Zhang, Yang & Masunaga, 2003
- Diostracus longicercus Zhu, Yang & Masunaga, 2007
- Diostracus longicornis Saigusa, 1984
- Diostracus longiunguis Saigusa, 1984
- Diostracus maculatus Negrobov, 1980
- Diostracus magnipalpis Saigusa, 1984
- Diostracus makiharai Saigusa, 1984
- Diostracus malaisei Saigusa, 1995
- Diostracus mchughi Harmston, 1966
- Diostracus miyagii Takagi, 1968
- Diostracus morimotoi Saigusa & Masunaga, 1997
- Diostracus naegelei Negrobov, 1978
- Diostracus nakanishii Takagi, 1968
- Diostracus nebulosus Takagi, 1972
- Diostracus nepalensis Saigusa, 1984
- Diostracus nigrilineatus Saigusa, 1984
- Diostracus nigripilosus Saigusa, 1984
- Diostracus nishidai Saigusa, 1984
- Diostracus olga Aldrich, 1911
- Diostracus parvipunctatus Saigusa, 1984
- Diostracus parvus Saigusa, 1984
- Diostracus pennilobatus Saigusa, 1984
- Diostracus polytrichus Zhu, Tang & Yang, 2023
- Diostracus prasinus Loew, 1861
- Diostracus pretiosus Saigusa, 1984
- Diostracus prolongatus Yang & Saigusa, 2000
- Diostracus pulchripennis Saigusa, 1984
- Diostracus punctatus Takagi, 1968
- Diostracus quadrisetosus Saigusa, 1984
- Diostracus ramulosus Takagi, 1972
- Diostracus reticulatus Saigusa, 1984
- Diostracus rotundicornis Saigusa, 1984
- Diostracus saigusai Takagi, 1968
- Diostracus shimai Saigusa, 1984
- Diostracus simplicipes Saigusa, 1984
- Diostracus songxianus Yang & Saigusa, 1999
- Diostracus strenus Zhu, Tang & Yang, 2023
- Diostracus subalpinus (Negrobov, 1973)
- Diostracus tangalensis Saigusa, 1984
- Diostracus tarsalis Takagi, 1968
- Diostracus translucidus Zhu, Tang & Yang, 2023
- Diostracus tibetensis Wang, Wang & Yang, 2015
- Diostracus umbrinervis Saigusa, 1984
- Diostracus undulatus Takagi, 1968
- Diostracus unipunctatus Saigusa, 1984
- Diostracus unisetosus Saigusa, 1984
- Diostracus vitae Negrobov, 1980
- Diostracus wolongensis Zhang, Yang & Masunaga, 2005
- Diostracus yamamotoi Masunaga, 2000
- Diostracus yatai Masunaga, 2000
- Diostracus yukawai Takagi, 1968
- Diostracus zlobini Negrobov, 1980

Subgenus Lagodechia Negrobov & Zurikov, 1996:

- Diostracus filiformis Zhu, Masunaga & Yang, 2007
- Diostracus kabaki Grichanov, 2017
- Diostracus nishiyamai Saigusa, 1995 (Synonym: D. zhangjiajiensis Yang, 1998)
- Diostracus spinulifer Negrobov & Tsurikov, 1988

Subgenus Ozmena Özdikmen, 2010 (= Takagia Negrobov, 1973 nec Matsumura, 1942):

- Diostracus stackelbergi (Negrobov, 1965)

Subgenus Sphyrotarsus Mik, 1874:

- Diostracus argyrostomus (Mik, 1874)
- Diostracus caucasicus (Negrobov, 1965)
- Diostracus hervebazini (Parent, 1914)
- Diostracus hessei (Parent, 1914)
- Diostracus hygrophilus (Becker, 1891)
- Diostracus kustovi Grichanov, 2013
- Diostracus parenti (Hesse, 1933)
