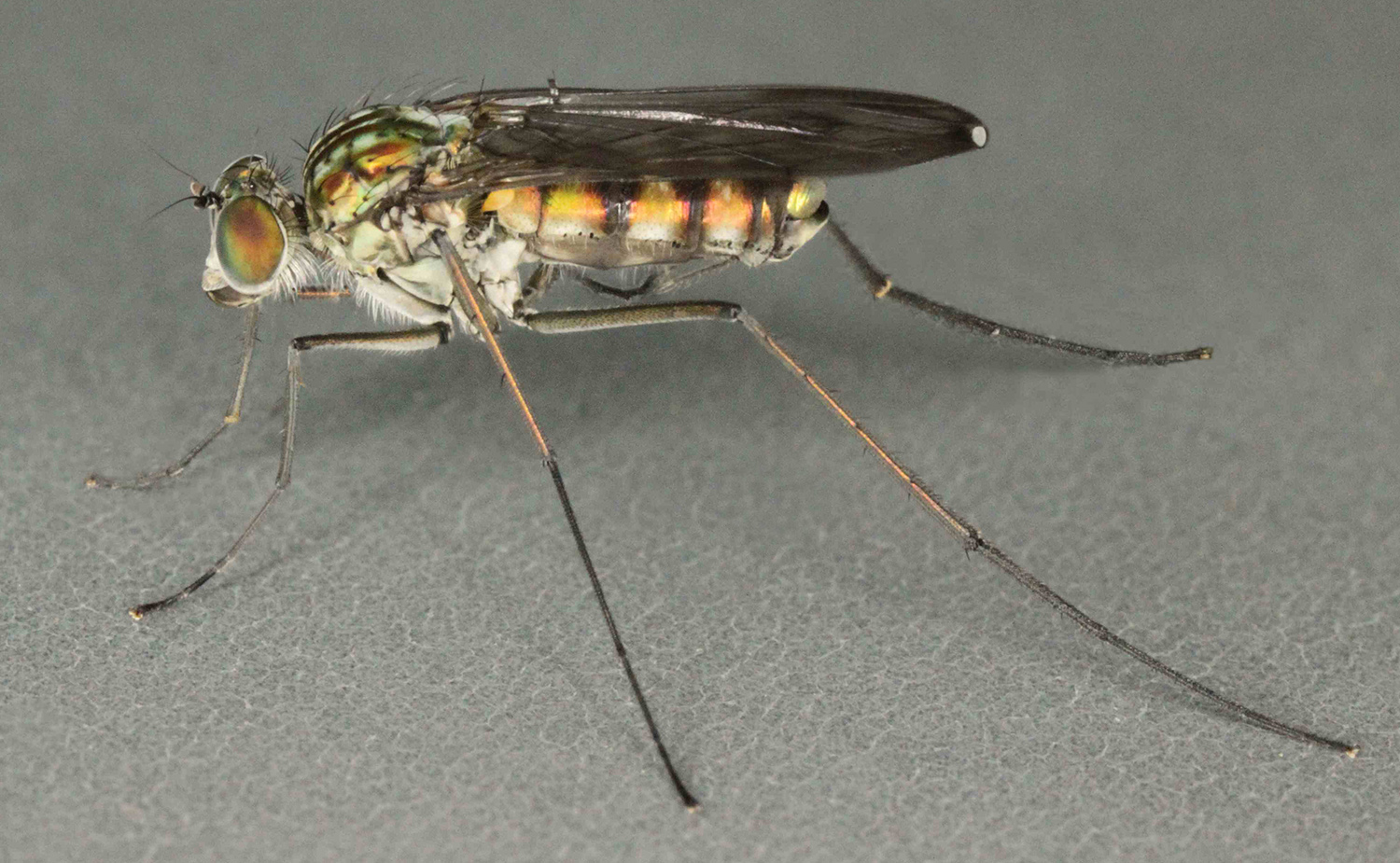
- Lianculus virens in North Wales

Scientific classification
- Kingdom: Animalia
- Phylum: Arthropoda
- Clade: Pancrustacea
- Class: Insecta
- Order: Diptera
- Family: Dolichopodidae
- Subfamily: Hydrophorinae
- Tribe: Hydrophorini
- Genus: Liancalus
- Species: L. virens

Binomial name
- Liancalus virens (Scopoli, 1763)

Synonyms
- Musca virens Scopoli, 1763; Dolichopus regius Fabricius, 1805

= Liancalus virens =

Species of fly

Liancalus virens is a species of fly in the family Dolichopodidae.
