= Scellus virago =

Scientific classification
- Kingdom: Animalia
- Phylum: Arthropoda
- Clade: Pancrustacea
- Class: Insecta
- Order: Diptera
- Family: Dolichopodidae
- Subfamily: Hydrophorinae
- Tribe: Hydrophorini
- Genus: Scellus
- Species: S. virago

Binomial name
- Scellus virago Aldrich, 1907

Species of fly

Scellus virago is a species of long-legged fly in the family Dolichopodidae.
