= Hypocharassus farinosus =

Scientific classification
- Kingdom: Animalia
- Phylum: Arthropoda
- Clade: Pancrustacea
- Class: Insecta
- Order: Diptera
- Family: Dolichopodidae
- Subfamily: Hydrophorinae
- Tribe: Hypocharassini
- Genus: Hypocharassus
- Species: H. farinosus

Binomial name
- Hypocharassus farinosus Becker, 1922

Species of fly

Hypocharassus farinosus is a species of fly in the family Dolichopodidae.

== Distribution ==
Taiwan
