= Melanderia mandibulata =

Scientific classification
- Kingdom: Animalia
- Phylum: Arthropoda
- Clade: Pancrustacea
- Class: Insecta
- Order: Diptera
- Family: Dolichopodidae
- Subfamily: Hydrophorinae
- Tribe: Hydrophorini
- Genus: Melanderia
- Species: M. mandibulata

Binomial name
- Melanderia mandibulata Aldrich, 1922

Species of fly

Melanderia mandibulata is a species of long-legged fly in the family Dolichopodidae.
