= Hydrophorus alboflorens =

Scientific classification
- Kingdom: Animalia
- Phylum: Arthropoda
- Clade: Pancrustacea
- Class: Insecta
- Order: Diptera
- Family: Dolichopodidae
- Subfamily: Hydrophorinae
- Tribe: Hydrophorini
- Genus: Hydrophorus
- Species: H. alboflorens

Binomial name
- Hydrophorus alboflorens (Walker, 1849)

Synonyms
- Hydrophorus pirata Loew, 1861; Medeterus alboflorens Walker, 1849

Species of fly

Hydrophorus alboflorens is a species of long-legged fly in the family Dolichopodidae.
