= Paralleloneurum =

Scientific classification
- Kingdom: Animalia
- Phylum: Arthropoda
- Clade: Pancrustacea
- Class: Insecta
- Order: Diptera
- Family: Dolichopodidae
- Subfamily: Hydrophorinae
- Tribe: Thinophilini
- Genus: Paralleloneurum; Becker, 1902

Type species
- Paralleloneurum cilifemoratum Becker, 1902

Genus of fly

Paralleloneurum is a genus of flies in the family Dolichopodidae. It is closely related to the genera Thinophilus and Nanothinophilus.

== Species ==
- Paralleloneurum cilifemoratum Becker, 1902 – Egypt, Taiwan, Calcutta, Bengal
- Paralleloneurum pygmaeum De Meijere, 1916 – Indonesia: Java
