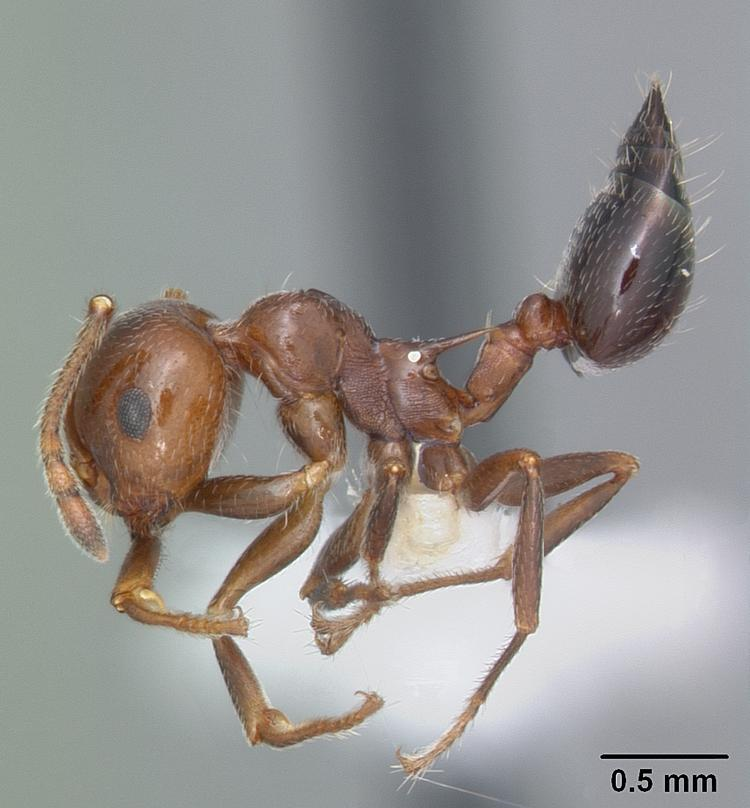

Scientific classification
- Kingdom: Animalia
- Phylum: Arthropoda
- Class: Insecta
- Order: Hymenoptera
- Family: Formicidae
- Subfamily: Myrmicinae
- Genus: Crematogaster
- Species: C. atkinsoni

Binomial name
- Crematogaster atkinsoni Wheeler, 1919

= Crematogaster atkinsoni =

Species of ant

Crematogaster atkinsoni is a species of ant in tribe Crematogastrini. It was described by Wheeler in 1919.
