= Nanothinophilus =

Scientific classification
- Kingdom: Animalia
- Phylum: Arthropoda
- Clade: Pancrustacea
- Class: Insecta
- Order: Diptera
- Family: Dolichopodidae
- Subfamily: Hydrophorinae
- Tribe: Thinophilini
- Genus: Nanothinophilus; Grootaert & Meuffels, 1998

Type species
- Nanothinophilus armatus Grootaert & Meuffels, 1998

Genus of fly

Nanothinophilus is a genus of flies in the family Dolichopodidae. It includes four species, all found in mangroves along the Andaman Sea coast in Thailand. It is closely related to the genera Thinophilus and Paralleloneurum. In several studies, the genus Thinophilus was suggested to be paraphyletic with respect to Nanothinophilus.

== Species ==
- Nanothinophilus armatus Grootaert & Meuffels, 1998
- Nanothinophilus dolichurus Grootaert & Meuffels, 1998
- Nanothinophilus hoplites Grootaert & Meuffels, 2001
- Nanothinophilus pauperculus Grootaert & Meuffels, 1998
