= Hydatostega viridiflos =

Scientific classification
- Kingdom: Animalia
- Phylum: Arthropoda
- Clade: Pancrustacea
- Class: Insecta
- Order: Diptera
- Family: Dolichopodidae
- Subfamily: Hydrophorinae
- Tribe: Hydrophorini
- Genus: Hydatostega
- Species: H. viridiflos

Binomial name
- Hydatostega viridiflos (Walker, 1852)

Synonyms
- Hydatostega virdiflos (Walker, 1852); Medetera intentus Aldrich, 1911; Medeterus viridiflos Walker, 1852

Species of fly

Hydatostega viridiflos is a species of long-legged fly in the family Dolichopodidae.

== Subspecies ==
There are three known subspecies of H. viridiflos:

- Hydatostega viridiflos fulvidorsum (Van Duzee, 1925)
- Hydatostega viridiflos gratiosa (Aldrich, 1911)
- Hydatostega viridiflos viridiflos (Walker, 1852)

According to BugGuide, H. v. viridflos is found along the coast of Northeast North America, while the other subspecies are found in Western North America.
