= Aphrosylus temaranus =

Scientific classification
- Kingdom: Animalia
- Phylum: Arthropoda
- Clade: Pancrustacea
- Class: Insecta
- Order: Diptera
- Family: Dolichopodidae
- Subfamily: Hydrophorinae
- Tribe: Aphrosylini
- Genus: Aphrosylus
- Species: A. temaranus

Binomial name
- Aphrosylus temaranus Vaillant, 1955

Species of fly

Aphrosylus temaranus is a species of fly in the family Dolichopodidae.

== Distribution ==
Morocco.
