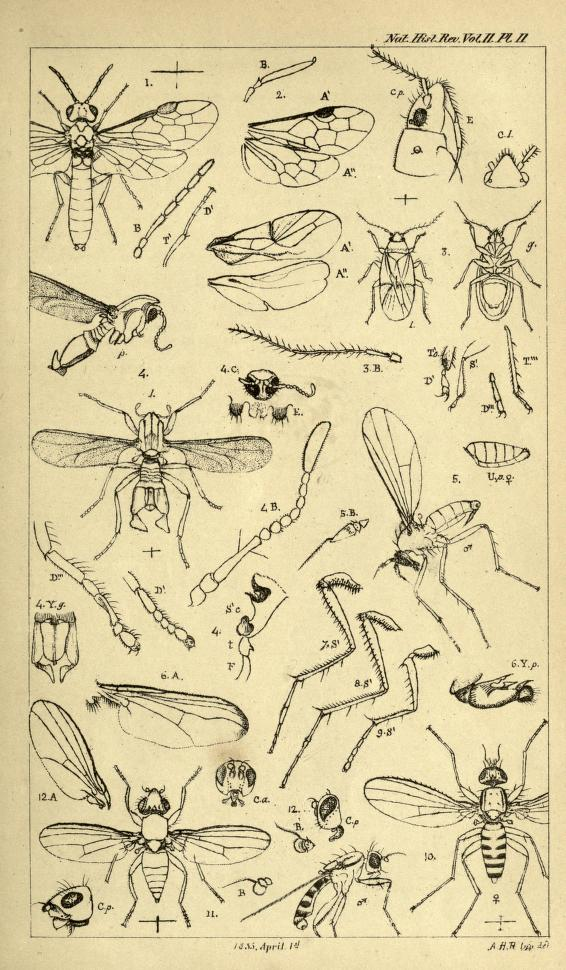

Scientific classification
- Kingdom: Animalia
- Phylum: Arthropoda
- Clade: Pancrustacea
- Class: Insecta
- Order: Diptera
- Family: Dolichopodidae
- Subfamily: Hydrophorinae
- Tribe: Aphrosylini
- Genus: Aphrosylus
- Species: A. ferox

Binomial name
- Aphrosylus ferox Haliday, 1851

= Aphrosylus ferox =

Species of fly

Aphrosylus ferox is a species of fly in the family Dolichopodidae.
