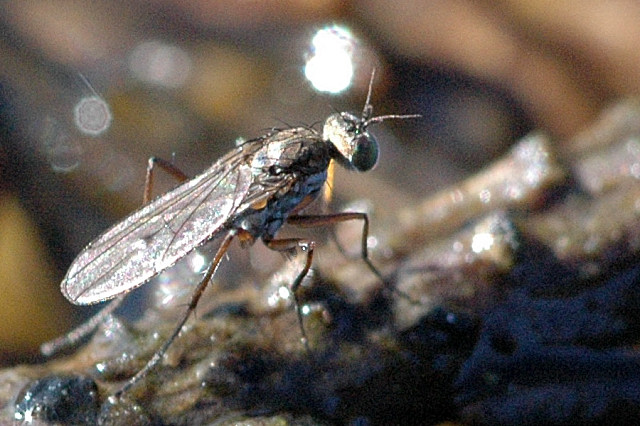

Scientific classification
- Kingdom: Animalia
- Phylum: Arthropoda
- Clade: Pancrustacea
- Class: Insecta
- Order: Diptera
- Family: Dolichopodidae
- Subfamily: Hydrophorinae
- Tribe: Hydrophorini
- Genus: Hydrophorus
- Species: H. balticus

Binomial name
- Hydrophorus balticus (Meigen, 1824)

Synonyms
- Medeterus balticus Meigen, 1824

= Hydrophorus balticus =

Species of fly

Hydrophorus balticus is a species of fly in the family of Dolichopodidae.
