= Liancalus limbatus =

Scientific classification
- Kingdom: Animalia
- Phylum: Arthropoda
- Clade: Pancrustacea
- Class: Insecta
- Order: Diptera
- Family: Dolichopodidae
- Subfamily: Hydrophorinae
- Tribe: Hydrophorini
- Genus: Liancalus
- Species: L. limbatus

Binomial name
- Liancalus limbatus Van Duzee, 1917

Species of fly

Liancalus limbatus is a species in the family Dolichopodidae ("longlegged flies"), in the order Diptera ("flies").
