= Abatetia =

Scientific classification
- Kingdom: Animalia
- Phylum: Arthropoda
- Clade: Pancrustacea
- Class: Insecta
- Order: Diptera
- Family: Dolichopodidae
- Subfamily: Hydrophorinae
- Tribe: Hydrophorini
- Genus: Abatetia; Miller, 1945
- Species: A. robusta

Binomial name
- Abatetia robusta (Parent, 1933)

Synonyms
- Genus: Nelsonia Parent, 1933 (nec Merriam, 1897); Species: Cymatopus robustus (Parent, 1933); Nelsonia robusta Parent, 1933

Genus of flies

Abatetia is a genus of flies in the family Dolichopodidae. It contains a single species, Abatetia robusta, and is found in New Zealand. The genus was originally known as Nelsonia, named by Octave Parent in 1933. The genus was then transferred to Cymatopus by Parent in 1937. Separately, David Miller found the name Nelsonia to be preoccupied by Nelsonia (Merriam, 1897), and renamed it to Abatetia in 1945. However, the genus remained a synonym of Cymatopus until 1984, when it was restored as a separate genus by Henk J. G. Meuffels and Patrick Grootaert. Due to Nelsonia being preoccupied, Abatetia became the name of the genus.
