= Paraliancalus =

Scientific classification
- Kingdom: Animalia
- Phylum: Arthropoda
- Clade: Pancrustacea
- Class: Insecta
- Order: Diptera
- Family: Dolichopodidae
- Subfamily: Hydrophorinae
- Tribe: Hydrophorini
- Genus: Paraliancalus; Parent, 1938

Type species
- Liancalus metallicus Grimshaw, 1901

Genus of flies

Paraliancalus is a genus of flies in the family Dolichopodidae. It is found in Hawaii.

== Species ==
- Paraliancalus laciniafemur Evenhuis & Bickel, 2011
- Paraliancalus metallicus (Grimshaw, 1901)
