= Aphrosylopsis =

Conservation status
- Naturally Uncommon (NZ TCS)

Scientific classification
- Kingdom: Animalia
- Phylum: Arthropoda
- Clade: Pancrustacea
- Class: Insecta
- Order: Diptera
- Family: Dolichopodidae
- Subfamily: Hydrophorinae
- Tribe: Hydrophorini
- Genus: Aphrosylopsis; Lamb, 1909
- Species: A. lineata

Binomial name
- Aphrosylopsis lineata Lamb, 1909

Genus of flies

Aphrosylopsis is a genus of flies in the family Dolichopodidae. It is endemic to the Bounty Islands of New Zealand. It contains only one species, Aphrosylopsis lineata (sometimes known as Aphrosylopsis lineatus).
