= Goldman's diminutive woodrat =

Conservation status
- Endangered (IUCN 3.1)

Scientific classification
- Kingdom: Animalia
- Phylum: Chordata
- Class: Mammalia
- Order: Rodentia
- Family: Cricetidae
- Subfamily: Neotominae
- Genus: Nelsonia
- Species: N. goldmani

Binomial name
- Nelsonia goldmani Merriam, 1903

Species of rodent

Goldman's diminutive woodrat (Nelsonia goldmani) is a species of rodent in the family Cricetidae. It is found only in Mexico.
