= Minjerribah litoura =

Scientific classification
- Kingdom: Animalia
- Phylum: Arthropoda
- Clade: Pancrustacea
- Class: Insecta
- Order: Diptera
- Family: Dolichopodidae
- Subfamily: Hydrophorinae
- Genus: Minjerribah; Bickel, 2019
- Species: M. litoura

Binomial name
- Minjerribah litoura Bickel, 2019

Species of fly

Minjerribah litoura is a species of fly belonging to the family Dolichopodidae, and the only member of the genus Minjerribah. It was described from North Stradbroke Island in southeastern Queensland, Australia. The name of the genus is the name for North Stradbroke Island given by the Quandamooka people.
