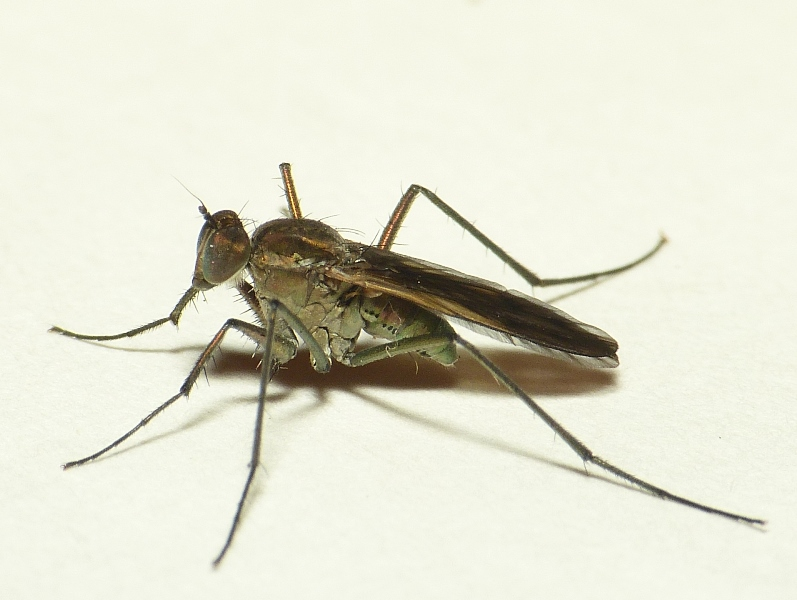
- Scellus notatus

Scientific classification
- Kingdom: Animalia
- Phylum: Arthropoda
- Clade: Pancrustacea
- Class: Insecta
- Order: Diptera
- Family: Dolichopodidae
- Subfamily: Hydrophorinae
- Tribe: Hydrophorini
- Genus: Scellus; Loew, 1857

Type species
- Hydrophorus spinimanus Zetterstedt, 1843

= Scellus =

Genus of flies

Scellus is a genus of flies in the family Dolichopodidae. It is distributed in the Palearctic and Nearctic.

Males of the genus have a pair of flag-like appendages, known as "signa" (singular "signum"), that emanate laterally from between the 4th and 5th abdominal segments. These appendages are connected together by a band under the sternites, forming a U-shaped structure called the "cingulum". It has been suggested by researchers that these appendages are used for visual signalling or pheromone dispersal during courtship. The genus Hydatostega also has a cingulum, but much reduced, suggesting that Scellus and Hydatostega are closely related.

== Species ==
- Scellus abditus Hurley, 1995
- Scellus alactaga Stackelberg, 1951
- Scellus amplus Curran, 1923
- Scellus asaroticus Hurley, 1995
- Scellus avidus Loew, 1864
- Scellus bianchii Stackelberg, 1951
- Scellus coloradensis Harmston & James in Harmston & Knowlton, 1942
- Scellus crinipes Van Duzee, 1925
- Scellus dolichocerus Gerstaecker, 1864
- Scellus dyscritus Hurley, 1995
- Scellus exustus (Walker, 1852)
- Scellus filifer Loew, 1864
- Scellus gallicanus Becker, 1909
- Scellus grichanovi Naglis, 2012
- Scellus hissaricus Stackelberg, 1951
- Scellus knowltoni Harmston, 1939
- Scellus monstrosus Osten Sacken, 1877
- Scellus notatus (Fabricius, 1781)
- Scellus obuchovae (Stackelberg, 1951)
- Scellus paramonovi Stackelberg, 1926
- Scellus sinensis Yang, 1998
- Scellus spinimanus (Zetterstedt, 1843)
- Scellus tshernovskii Stackelberg, 1951
- Scellus varipennis Van Duzee, 1925
- Scellus vigil Osten Sacken, 1877
- Scellus virago Aldrich, 1907
