= Hydatostega =

Scientific classification
- Kingdom: Animalia
- Phylum: Arthropoda
- Clade: Pancrustacea
- Class: Insecta
- Order: Diptera
- Family: Dolichopodidae
- Subfamily: Hydrophorinae
- Tribe: Hydrophorini
- Genus: Hydatostega; Philippi, 1865

Type species
- Hydatostega poliogaster Philippi, 1865

Synonyms
- Millardia Curran, 1934 (nec Thomas, 1911)

Genus of flies

Hydatostega is a genus of flies in the family Dolichopodidae. Most of its species are found in the Americas, where it is mainly restricted to montane habitats and high altitudes or latitudes, while three species are known from Tristan da Cunha, a group of islands in the South Atlantic Ocean. Hydatostega was formerly considered a synonym of Hydrophorus, but was recently restored as a separate genus.

== Species ==
- Hydatostega carmichaeli (Walker, 1849) − Tristan da Cunha
- Hydatostega cerutias (Loew, 1872) – Canada, USA
- Hydatostega christopherseni (Frey, 1954) − Tristan da Cunha
- Hydatostega elevata (Becker, 1922) – Peru, Chile
- Hydatostega kuscheli (Harmston, 1955) – Chile (Juan Fernández Islands)
- Hydatostega nervosa (Becker, 1922) – Chile (Strait of Magellan)
- Hydatostega ochrifacies (Van Duzee, 1930) – Chile
- Hydatostega plumbea (Aldrich, 1911) − USA
- Hydatostega poliogaster Philippi, 1865 – Chile (Santiago, Juan Fernández Islands), Uruguay
- Hydatostega tristanensis (Macquart, 1847) − Tristan da Cunha
- Hydatostega viridiflos (Walker, 1852) − Canada, USA, Mexico
