= Hydrophorus nebulosus =

- Hydrophorus nebulosus North Wales

Scientific classification
- Kingdom: Animalia
- Phylum: Arthropoda
- Clade: Pancrustacea
- Class: Insecta
- Order: Diptera
- Family: Dolichopodidae
- Subfamily: Hydrophorinae
- Tribe: Hydrophorini
- Genus: Hydrophorus
- Species: H. nebulosus

Binomial name
- Hydrophorus nebulosus (Fallen, 1823)

Species of fly

Hydrophorus nebulosus is a species of fly in the family Dolichopodidae. It is found in the Palearctic.
