= Liancalomima =

Scientific classification
- Kingdom: Animalia
- Phylum: Arthropoda
- Clade: Pancrustacea
- Class: Insecta
- Order: Diptera
- Family: Dolichopodidae
- Subfamily: Hydrophorinae
- Tribe: Hydrophorini
- Genus: Liancalomima; Stackelberg, 1931

Type species
- Liancalomima gracilipes Stackelberg, 1931

Synonyms
- Liancalomina

Genus of flies

Liancalomima is a genus of flies in the family Dolichopodidae.

== Species ==
- Liancalomima fasciata Parent, 1934 − India
- Liancalomima gracilipes Stackelberg, 1931 − Indonesia
