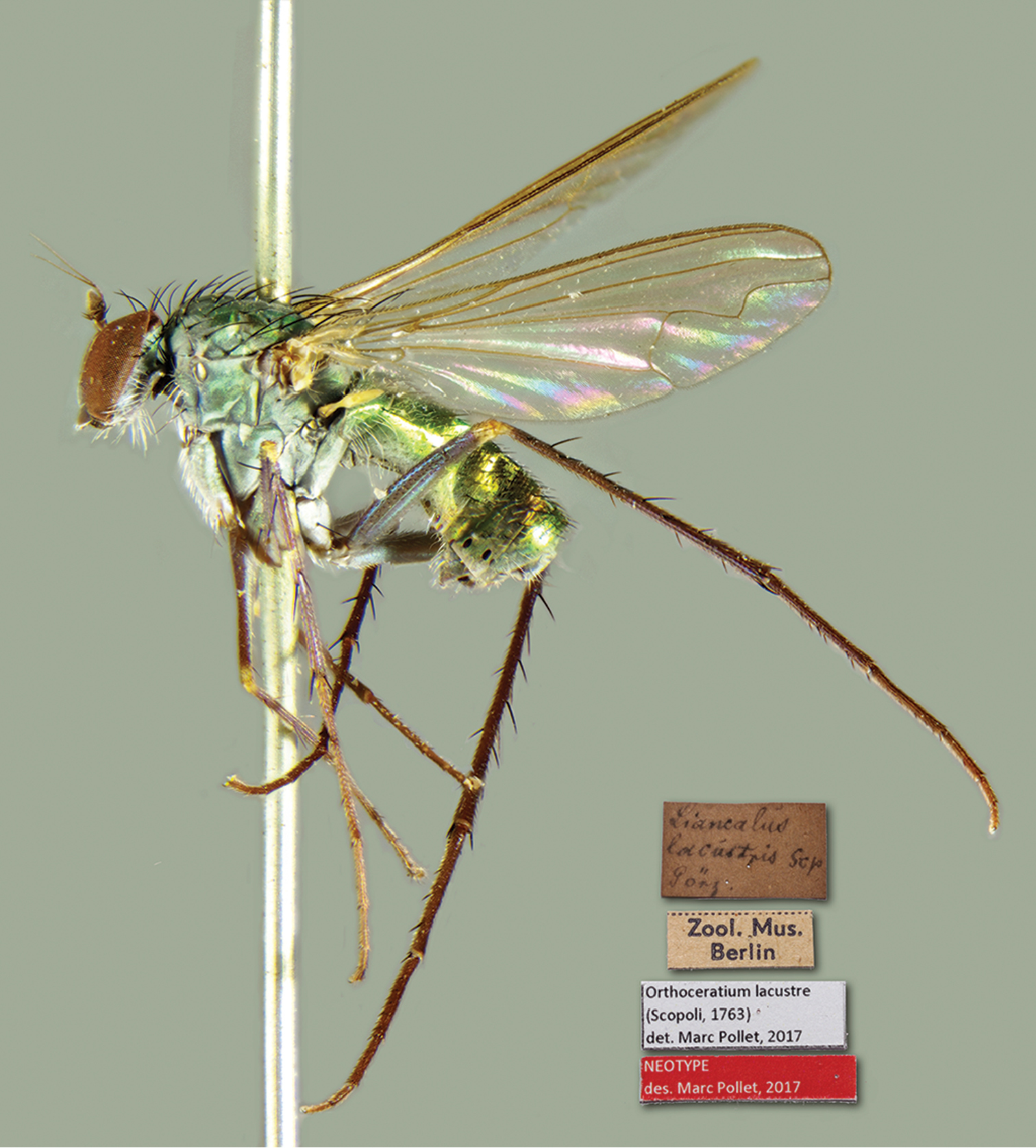
- Orthoceratium lacustre

Scientific classification
- Kingdom: Animalia
- Phylum: Arthropoda
- Clade: Pancrustacea
- Class: Insecta
- Order: Diptera
- Family: Dolichopodidae
- Subfamily: Hydrophorinae
- Tribe: Hydrophorini
- Genus: Orthoceratium; Schrank, 1803

Type species
- Musca lacustris Scopoli, 1763

Synonyms
- Alloeoneurus Mik, 1878

= Orthoceratium =

Genus of flies

Orthoceratium is a genus of flies in the family Dolichopodidae. Only two species are included in the genus, Orthoceratium lacustre and Orthoceratium sabulosum. They are known from the West Palaearctic and Tanzania.

In 2018, researchers Marc Pollet and Andreas Stark found that the species O. sabulosum in northwestern Europe had been misidentified as O. lacustre for over 250 years. According to the researchers, these misidentifications can be explained by previous authors copying identification keys with misleading information, the omission by those authors to study the type specimens of O. sabulosum, and the loss of those of O. lacustre.

== Species ==
The following two species are included in the genus:

- Orthoceratium lacustre (Scopoli, 1763)
- Orthoceratium sabulosum (Becker, 1907)
