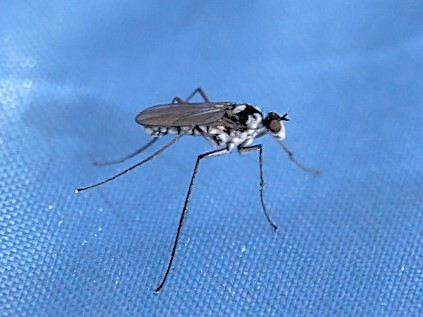

Scientific classification
- Kingdom: Animalia
- Phylum: Arthropoda
- Clade: Pancrustacea
- Class: Insecta
- Order: Diptera
- Family: Dolichopodidae
- Genus: Thambemyia
- Species: T. borealis

Binomial name
- Thambemyia borealis (Takagi, 1965)

Synonyms
- Conchopus borealis Takagi, 1965

= Thambemyia borealis =

Species of fly

Thambemyia borealis (or Conchopus borealis) is a species of fly in the family Dolichopodidae. It is native to Japan, where it can be found in intertidal zones of rocky shores, and has been introduced to coastal sites near major seaports in California, Alabama, New Jersey and Peru. Adults are predators of chironomid larvae.
