= Epithalassius =

Scientific classification
- Kingdom: Animalia
- Phylum: Arthropoda
- Clade: Pancrustacea
- Class: Insecta
- Order: Diptera
- Family: Dolichopodidae
- Subfamily: Hydrophorinae
- Tribe: Epithalassiini
- Genus: Epithalassius; Mik, 1891

Type species
- Epithalassius sanctimarci Mik, 1891

Genus of flies

Epithalassius is a genus of flies in the family Dolichopodidae, with eight known species. They are generally found in the Palaearctic, occurring on sand beaches near the coast. An exception to this is E. africus, which was described from a damaged female specimen collected near Brazzaville in the Republic of the Congo. The generic assignment of this African species has been doubted. E. corsicanus has also been recorded from Saint Helena in the Atlantic Ocean, and is probably an introduced species to the island.

== Species ==
The following eight species are included in the genus:

- Epithalassius africus Parent, 1930 – Congo (near Brazzaville)
- Epithalassius caucasicus Becker, 1918 – Bulgaria, "Black Sea coast of the Caucasus"
- Epithalassius corsicanus Becker, 1910 – France (Corsica), Israel, Saint Helena (introduced?)
- Epithalassius elegantula Villeneuve, 1920 – France (Royan, Finistère)
- Epithalassius gloagueni Grichanov, 2021 – France (Brittany)
- Epithalassius sanctimarci Mik, 1891 – Corsica, Italy, Spain
- Epithalassius stackelbergi Besovski, 1966 – Bulgaria, Romania
- Epithalassius susmani Grichanov, 2008 – Israel
