= Teneriffa spicata =

Scientific classification
- Kingdom: Animalia
- Phylum: Arthropoda
- Clade: Pancrustacea
- Class: Insecta
- Order: Diptera
- Family: Dolichopodidae
- Subfamily: Hydrophorinae
- Tribe: Aphrosylini
- Genus: Teneriffa; Becker, 1908
- Species: T. spicata

Binomial name
- Teneriffa spicata Becker, 1908

Species of fly

Teneriffa spicata is a species of fly in the family Dolichopodidae, and the only member of the genus Teneriffa. It was first described from Tenerife in the Canary Islands, and was later reported from Madeira.
