= Thinolestris =

Scientific classification
- Kingdom: Animalia
- Phylum: Arthropoda
- Clade: Pancrustacea
- Class: Insecta
- Order: Diptera
- Family: Dolichopodidae
- Subfamily: Hydrophorinae
- Tribe: Aphrosylini
- Genus: Thinolestris; Grootaert & Meuffels, 1988

Type species
- Thinolestris luteola Grootaert & Meuffels, 1988

Genus of flies

Thinolestris is a genus of flies in the family Dolichopodidae. The genus is distributed along the coasts of the Western Pacific and Southeast Asia, and members of the genus are found in the intertidal zone. According to Grootaert and Evenhuis (2006), adults are active on beaches with small pebbles mixed with sandy patches.

== Species ==
- Thinolestris luteola Grootaert & Meuffels, 1988 – Papua New Guinea
- Thinolestris nigra Grootaert & Evenhuis, 2006 – Singapore, Malaysia, Brunei
- Thinolestris obscura Grootaert & Meuffels, 1988 – Indonesia (North Sulawesi)
- Thinolestris thaica Grootaert & Meuffels, 2001 – Thailand, Malaysia
