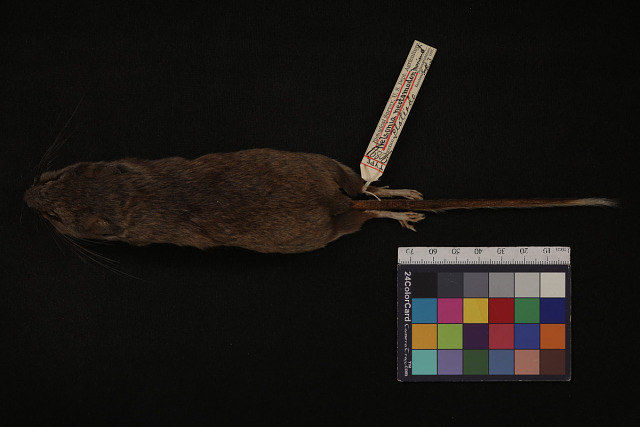

Conservation status
- Least Concern (IUCN 3.1)

Scientific classification
- Kingdom: Animalia
- Phylum: Chordata
- Class: Mammalia
- Order: Rodentia
- Family: Cricetidae
- Subfamily: Neotominae
- Genus: Nelsonia
- Species: N. neotomodon

Binomial name
- Nelsonia neotomodon Merriam, 1897

= Diminutive woodrat =

Species of rodent

The diminutive woodrat (Nelsonia neotomodon) is a species of rodent in the family Cricetidae. It is endemic to Mexico.
