= Paraliptus =

Scientific classification
- Kingdom: Animalia
- Phylum: Arthropoda
- Clade: Pancrustacea
- Class: Insecta
- Order: Diptera
- Family: Dolichopodidae
- Subfamily: Hydrophorinae
- Tribe: Hydrophorini
- Genus: Paraliptus; Bezzi, 1923
- Species: P. mirabilis

Binomial name
- Paraliptus mirabilis Bezzi, 1923

Genus of flies

Paraliptus is a genus of flies in the family Dolichopodidae. It contains only one species, Paraliptus mirabilis, and is found in Australia.
