= Melanderia =

Scientific classification
- Kingdom: Animalia
- Phylum: Arthropoda
- Clade: Pancrustacea
- Class: Insecta
- Order: Diptera
- Family: Dolichopodidae
- Subfamily: Hydrophorinae
- Tribe: Hydrophorini
- Genus: Melanderia; Aldrich, 1922

Type species
- Melanderia mandibulata Aldrich, 1922

Genus of flies

Melanderia is a genus of flies in the family Dolichopodidae. It is distributed along the West Coast of the United States, and members of the genus live in the intertidal zone. The adults have modified labellae that resemble mandibles.

== Species ==
The genus is divided into two subgenera, Melanderia and Wirthia:

- Subgenus Melanderia Aldrich, 1922:
  - Melanderia crepuscula Arnaud, 1958 – California (Pacific Grove)
  - Melanderia mandibulata Aldrich, 1922 – Washington, Oregon, California
- Subgenus Wirthia Arnaud, 1958:
  - Melanderia californica Harmston, 1972 – California (San Diego)
  - Melanderia curvipes (Van Duzee, 1918) – California (San Diego)
