= Coracocephalus =

Scientific classification
- Kingdom: Animalia
- Phylum: Arthropoda
- Clade: Pancrustacea
- Class: Insecta
- Order: Diptera
- Family: Dolichopodidae
- Subfamily: Hydrophorinae
- Tribe: Hydrophorini
- Genus: Coracocephalus; Mik, 1892

Type species
- Coracocephalus stroblii Mik, 1892

Genus of flies

Coracocephalus is a genus of flies in the family Dolichopodidae. It includes two species distributed in Austria.

== Species ==
- Coracocephalus humilis (Loew, 1869) (synonym: Coracocephalus miki Parent, 1927)
- Coracocephalus stroblii Mik, 1892
