= Anahydrophorus =

Scientific classification
- Kingdom: Animalia
- Phylum: Arthropoda
- Clade: Pancrustacea
- Class: Insecta
- Order: Diptera
- Family: Dolichopodidae
- Subfamily: Hydrophorinae
- Tribe: Hydrophorini
- Genus: Anahydrophorus; Becker, 1917
- Species: A. cinereus

Binomial name
- Anahydrophorus cinereus (Fabricius, 1805)

Synonyms
- Scatophaga cinerea Fabricius, 1805

Genus of flies

Anahydrophorus is a genus of flies in the family Dolichopodidae. It contains only one species, Anahydrophorus cinereus. It is recorded from southern Spain and Portugal in Europe, and it is widely distributed along the coasts of North Africa (Algeria, Morocco, Tunisia).
