= Eucoryphus =

Scientific classification
- Kingdom: Animalia
- Phylum: Arthropoda
- Clade: Pancrustacea
- Class: Insecta
- Order: Diptera
- Family: Dolichopodidae
- Subfamily: Hydrophorinae
- Tribe: Hydrophorini
- Genus: Eucoryphus; Mik, 1869

Type species
- Eucoryphus brunneri Mik, 1869

Genus of flies

Eucoryphus is a genus of flies in the family Dolichopodidae, with three species known from the Palearctic. It is found in the Alps and the mountains of southern Corsica.

== Species ==
The following three species are included in the genus:

- Eucoryphus brunneri Mik, 1869 – Austria, Germany, Italy and Switzerland
- Eucoryphus coeruleus Becker, 1889 – Austria, France, Germany, Italy and Switzerland
- Eucoryphus piscariviverus Pusch, Stark & Pollet, 2020 – France (Corsica)
