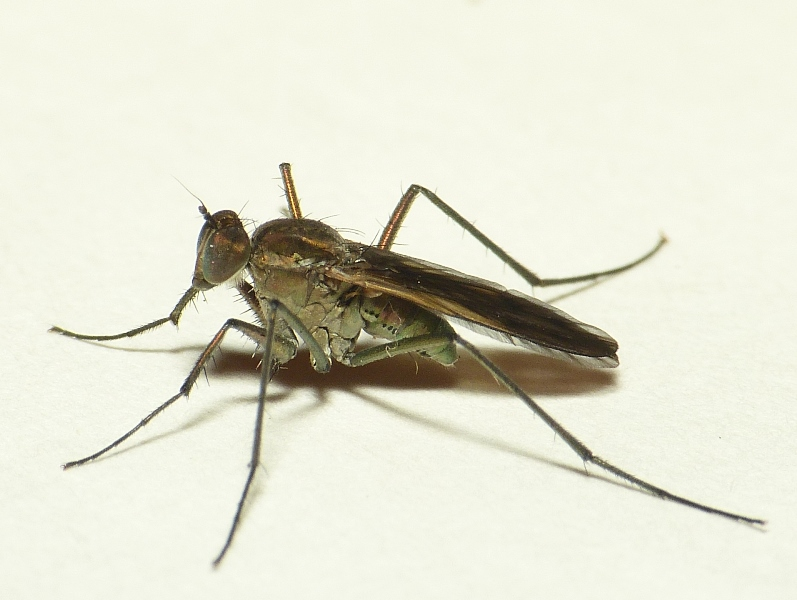
- Scellus notatus Netherlands

Scientific classification
- Kingdom: Animalia
- Phylum: Arthropoda
- Clade: Pancrustacea
- Class: Insecta
- Order: Diptera
- Family: Dolichopodidae
- Subfamily: Hydrophorinae
- Tribe: Hydrophorini
- Genus: Scellus
- Species: S. notatus

Binomial name
- Scellus notatus (Fabricius, 1781)

Synonyms
- Musca notatus Fabricius, 1781

= Scellus notatus =

Species of fly

Scellus notatus is a species of fly in the family of Dolichopodidae. It is found in the Palearctic.
