= Cymatopus =

Scientific classification
- Kingdom: Animalia
- Phylum: Arthropoda
- Clade: Pancrustacea
- Class: Insecta
- Order: Diptera
- Family: Dolichopodidae
- Subfamily: Hydrophorinae
- Tribe: Aphrosylini
- Genus: Cymatopus; Kertész, 1901

Type species
- Cymatopus tibialis Kertész, 1901

Synonyms
- Vanduzeeia Parent, 1939

Genus of flies

Cymatopus is a genus of flies in the family Dolichopodidae. Members of the genus are found on rocky coasts of the Indo-West Pacific.

== Species ==
The genus includes the following species:

- Cymatopus baravikai Evenhuis, 2005 – Fiji
- Cymatopus calcaratoides Grootaert & Meuffels, 1993 – Papua New Guinea
- Cymatopus calcaratus Parent, 1935 – Christmas Island
- Cymatopus femoralis Masunaga & Evenhuis, 2012 – Mariana Islands
- Cymatopus flavipes Evenhuis, 2005 – New Caledonia
- Cymatopus leopoldi Meuffels & Grootaert, 1984 – Australia, Papua New Guinea
- Cymatopus longipilus Parent, 1935 – Christmas Island, Thailand
- Cymatopus malayensis Parent, 1935 – Malaysia, Singapore, Thailand
- Cymatopus madagascarensis Grichanov, 2012 – Madagascar
- Cymatopus mayakunae Samoh, Satasook & Grootaert, 2018 – Thailand
- Cymatopus motuporensis Grootaert & Meuffels, 1993 – Papua New Guinea
- Cymatopus neocaledonicus Evenhuis, 2005 – New Caledonia
- Cymatopus othniopteryx Evenhuis, 2005 – East Timor
- Cymatopus simplex Parent, 1941 – Australia
- Cymatopus spinosus (Parent, 1934) – Samoa
- Cymatopus stuckenbergi Grootaert & Grichanov, 2008 – Madagascar
- Cymatopus thaicus Grootaert & Meuffels, 2001 – Malaysia, Thailand
- Cymatopus tibialis Kertész, 1901 – Papua New Guinea, Solomon Islands
- Cymatopus ventralis Masunaga & Evenhuis, 2012 – Mariana Islands

The following four Neotropical species may belong in a different genus, according to some researchers:

- Cymatopus bredini Robinson, 1975 – Dominica, Montserrat
- Cymatopus cheesmanae (Parent, 1934) – Cocos Island, Galápagos Islands
- Cymatopus setosus (Curran, 1932) – Galápagos Islands
- Cymatopus wirthi Robinson, 1975 – Panama

Cymatopus capensis Parent, 1939 is a synonym of Cemocarus griseatus (Curran, 1926), the type species of Cemocarus.
