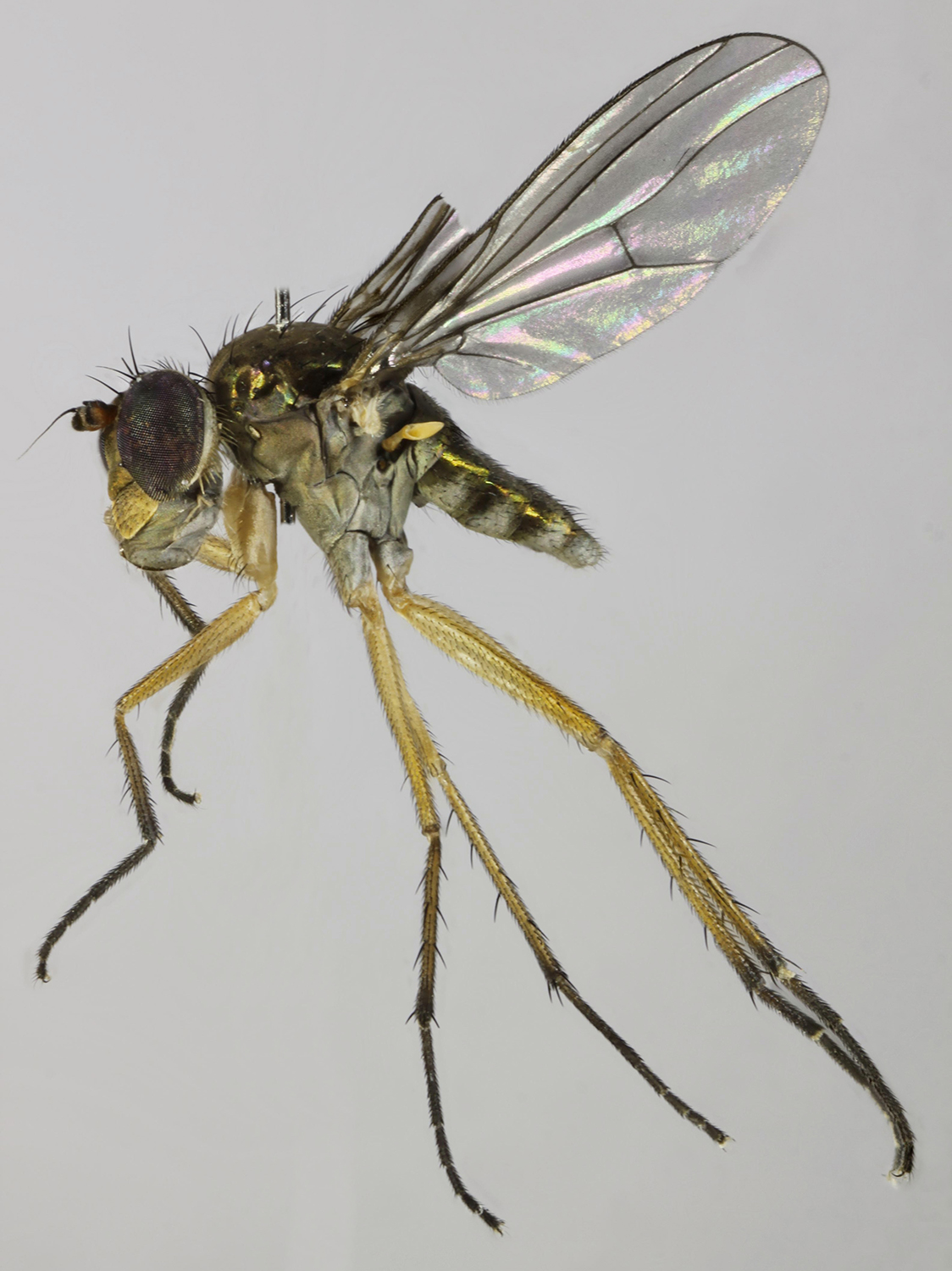

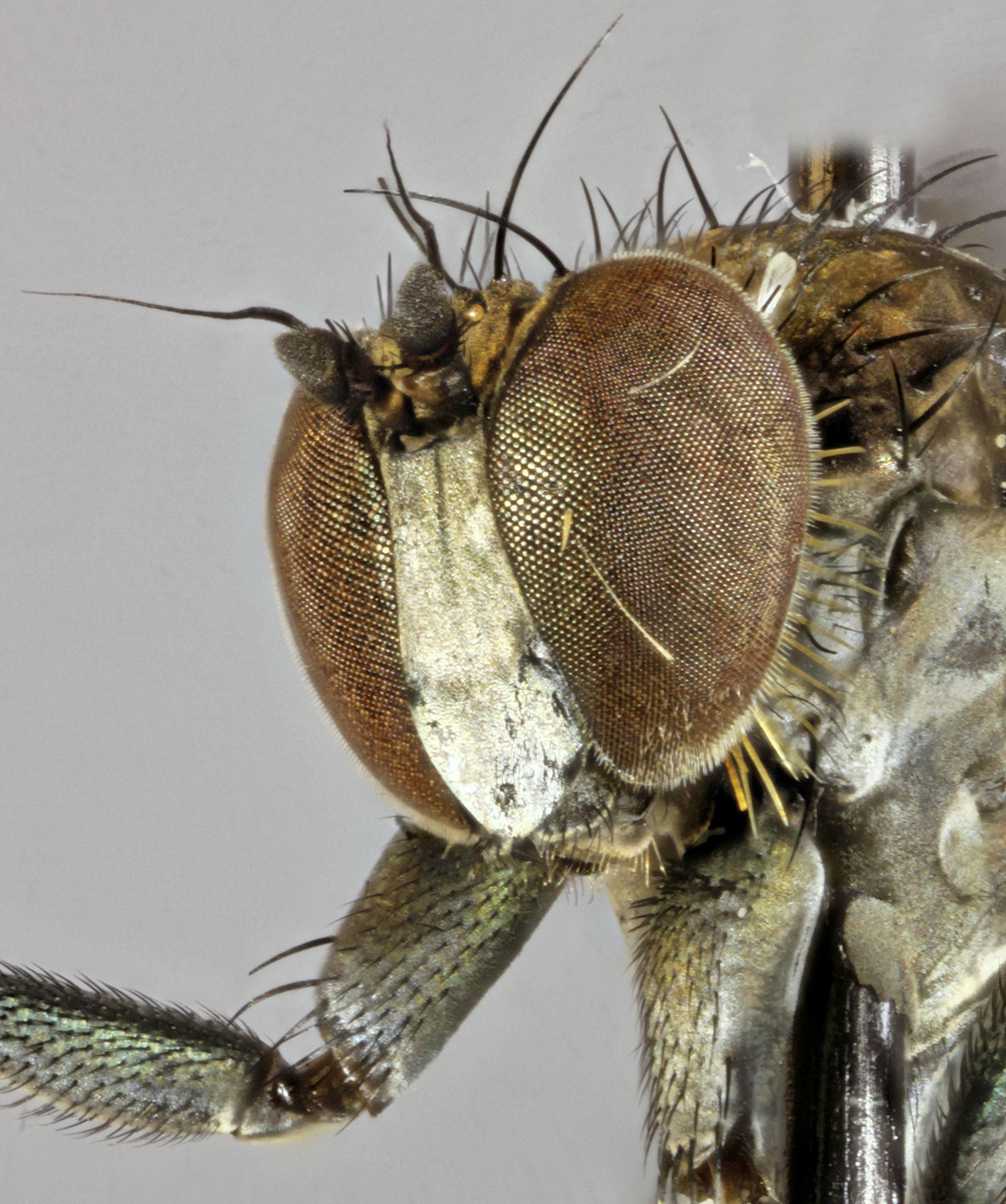
- Thinophilus ruficornis

Scientific classification
- Kingdom: Animalia
- Phylum: Arthropoda
- Clade: Pancrustacea
- Class: Insecta
- Order: Diptera
- Family: Dolichopodidae
- Subfamily: Hydrophorinae
- Tribe: Thinophilini
- Genus: Thinophilus; Wahlberg, 1844

Type species
- Rhaphium flavipalpe Zetterstedt, 1843

Synonyms
- Pseudacropsilus Strobl, 1899

= Thinophilus =

Genus of flies

Thinophilus is a genus of flies in the family Dolichopodidae. It includes about 146 described species distributed worldwide. Most species of the genus are found in coastal habitats, while a few species are found in freshwater habitats.

== Species ==
Subgenus Thinophilus Wahlberg, 1844:

- Thinophilus achilleus Mik, 1900
- Thinophilus aequalichaetus Parent, 1941
- Thinophilus amoenus Parent, 1935
- Thinophilus androegenus Hollis, 1964
- Thinophilus annulatus Parent, 1941
- Thinophilus annulitarsis Parent, 1936
- Thinophilus apicatus Grootaert, 2018
- Thinophilus aquaticus Becker, 1914
- Thinophilus argyropalpis Becker, 1910
- Thinophilus armiger Van Duzee, 1926
- Thinophilus asiobates Evenhuis & Grootaert, 2002
- Thinophilus atritarsis Parent, 1929
- Thinophilus bicalcaratus Negrobov, 1971
- Thinophilus bimaculatus Johnson, 1921
- Thinophilus bipunctatus Curran, 1926
- Thinophilus boonrotpongi Samoh, Satasook & Grootaert, 2017
- Thinophilus brevicilius Negrobov, 1971
- Thinophilus brevipes Van Duzee, 1932
- Thinophilus calopus Loew, 1852
- Thinophilus canities Van Duzee, 1926
- Thinophilus capensis Curran, 1926
- Thinophilus chaetulosus Grootaert, 2018
- Thinophilus chetitarsus Parent, 1935
- Thinophilus ciliatus Parent, 1935
- Thinophilus ciliventris Grichanov, 1997
- Thinophilus clavatus Zhu, Yang & Masunaga, 2006
- Thinophilus comatus Grootaert, 2018
- Thinophilus constrictus Parent, 1932
- Thinophilus cuneatus De Meijere, 1916
- Thinophilus delicatus Van Duzee, 1926
- Thinophilus depressus Van Duzee, 1926
- Thinophilus diminuatus Becker, 1922
- Thinophilus dongae Grootaert, Tang & Yang, 2015
- Thinophilus duplex Parent, 1935
- Thinophilus eboricoxa Bickel, 2013
- Thinophilus egenus Parent, 1935
- Thinophilus evenhuisi Grootaert, 2018
- Thinophilus flagellatus Grootaert & Meuffels, 1984
- Thinophilus flavicaudatus Robinson, 1964
- Thinophilus flavipalpis (Zetterstedt, 1843)
- Thinophilus formosinus Becker, 1922
- Thinophilus frontalis Van Duzee, 1914
- Thinophilus govaerei Grootaert & Meuffels, 1984
- Thinophilus hardyi Grootaert & Evenhuis, 1997
- Thinophilus imperialis (Curran, 1924)
- Thinophilus inaequalis Samoh & Grootaert, 2019
- Thinophilus indigenus Becker, 1902
- Thinophilus insertus Becker, 1922
- Thinophilus insulanus Van Duzee, 1926
- Thinophilus integer Becker, 1922
- Thinophilus lamellaris Zhu, Yang & Masunaga, 2006
- Thinophilus langkawensis Samoh, Satasook & Grootaert, 2017
- Thinophilus latimanus Van Duzee, 1926
- Thinophilus lenachanae Grootaert, 2018
- Thinophilus longicilia Evenhuis & Grootaert, 2002
- Thinophilus longipilus Negrobov, 1971
- Thinophilus longiventris Van Duzee, 1926
- Thinophilus lungosetole Ramos & Grootaert, 2018
- Thinophilus maculatus Parent, 1929
- Thinophilus magnipalpus Van Duzee, 1926
- Thinophilus meieri Grootaert & Evenhuis, 2018
- Thinophilus mekongensis Grootaert, 2017
- Thinophilus mexicanus Van Duzee, 1926
- Thinophilus minor Grootaert, 2018
- Thinophilus minutus Samoh, Satasook & Grootaert, 2017
- Thinophilus mirandus Becker, 1907
- Thinophilus modestus Becker, 1902
- Thinophilus munroi Curran, 1926
- Thinophilus murphyi Evenhuis & Grootaert, 2002
- Thinophilus neglectus Wheeler, 1899
- Thinophilus nigrilineatus Grootaert, 2018
- Thinophilus nigripennis Negrobov, Kumazawa & Tago, 2014
- Thinophilus nitens Grootaert & Meuffels, 2001
- Thinophilus ochrifacies Van Duzee, 1924
- Thinophilus ochripalpis Becker, 1910
- Thinophilus ornatus Negrobov & Gritchanov, 1982
- Thinophilus ovtshinnikovae Negrobov, Maslova & Selivanova, 2016
- Thinophilus pallidipes Parent, 1935
- Thinophilus pallitarsis Grootaert, 2018
- Thinophilus palpatus Parent, 1929
- Thinophilus panamensis Van Duzee, 1929
- Thinophilus parmatoides Samoh, Satasook & Grootaert, 2017
- Thinophilus parmatus Grootaert & Meuffels, 2001
- Thinophilus parvulus Samoh, Satasook & Grootaert, 2017
- Thinophilus pectinifer Wheeler, 1896
- Thinophilus pectinipes De Meijere, 1916
- Thinophilus penichrotes (Wei & Zheng, 1998)
- Thinophilus penicillatus Parent, 1935
- Thinophilus peninsularis Parent, 1935
- Thinophilus phollae Hollis, 1964
- Thinophilus plektron Samoh & Grootaert, 2019
- Thinophilus pollinosus Loew, 1871
- Thinophilus prasinus Johnson, 1921
- Thinophilus promotus Becker, 1910
- Thinophilus prudens Curran, 1926
- Thinophilus pruinosus Van Duzee, 1930
- Thinophilus puniamoorthyae Grootaert, 2018
- Thinophilus quadrimaculatus Becker, 1902
- Thinophilus quadrisetus Parent, 1936
- Thinophilus reizlae Ramos, Ang & Grootaert, 2020
- Thinophilus revicilius Negrobov, 1971
- Thinophilus rex Curran, 1926
- Thinophilus ronazeli Ramos & Grootaert, 2018
- Thinophilus rufibarbis Van Duzee, 1926
- Thinophilus ruficornis (Haliday, 1838)
- Thinophilus russelli Curran, 1927
- Thinophilus scopiventris Harmston & Knowlton, 1940
- Thinophilus scutohirtus Parent, 1941
- Thinophilus semipallidus Robinson, 1964
- Thinophilus seticoxis Becker, 1922
- Thinophilus setiventris Grootaert & Meuffels, 2001
- Thinophilus setosus Negrobov, 1979
- Thinophilus setulipalpis Bezzi, 1906
- Thinophilus simplex Grootaert, 2018
- Thinophilus sinclairi Negrobov, Maslova & Selivanova, 2017
- Thinophilus sinensis Yang & Li, 1998
- Thinophilus singaporensis Grootaert, 2018
- Thinophilus spinatoides Samoh, Satasook & Grootaert, 2017
- Thinophilus spinatus Samoh, Satasook & Grootaert, 2017
- Thinophilus spinipes Van Duzee, 1926
- Thinophilus spinitarsis Becker, 1907
- Thinophilus spinulosus Parent, 1929
- Thinophilus splendidus Vanschuytbroeck, 1951
- Thinophilus subapicalis Samoh & Grootaert, 2019
- Thinophilus superbus Grootaert, 2018
- Thinophilus taylori Parent, 1939
- Thinophilus tesselatus Becker, 1922
- Thinophilus thalassinus Van Duzee, 1926
- Thinophilus tinctus Parent, 1929
- Thinophilus trimaculatus Parent, 1934
- Thinophilus valentulus Parent, 1935
- Thinophilus vangoethemi Grootaert & Meuffels, 1984
- Thinophilus vanschuythroecki Negrobov, 1971
- Thinophilus variabilis Samoh, Satasook & Grootaert, 2017
- Thinophilus varicoxa Parent, 1935
- Thinophilus vespertinus Robinson, 1964
- Thinophilus vinculatus Harmston & Rapp, 1968
- Thinophilus violaceus Parent, 1935
- Thinophilus virgatus Curran, 1926
- Thinophilus viridifacies Van Duzee, 1924
- Thinophilus wasselli Hardy, 1935
- Thinophilus yarraloola Bickel, 2013
- Thinophilus yeoi Grootaert, 2018
- Thinophilus zhuae Grootaert, Tang & Yang, 2015

Subgenus Parathinophilus Parent, 1932

- Thinophilus expolitus (Parent, 1932)
- Thinophilus milleri Parent, 1933

Subgenus Schoenophilus Mik, 1878:

- Thinophilus acutifacies (Hollis, 1964)
- Thinophilus fuscicoxalis Grootaert & Meuffels, 1984
- Thinophilus grootaerti Negrobov, Maslova & Selivanova, 2016
- Thinophilus hilaris Parent, 1941
- Thinophilus pedestris (Lamb, 1909)
  - Thinophilus pedestris campbellensis (Harrison, 1964)
  - Thinophilus pedestris pedestris (Lamb, 1909)
- Thinophilus splendens Grootaert & Meuffels, 1984
- Thinophilus versutus Haliday, 1851

The following species are unplaced in the family:

- †Thinophilus piraticus Meunier, 1907
