= Oedematopus =

Scientific classification
- Kingdom: Animalia
- Phylum: Arthropoda
- Clade: Pancrustacea
- Class: Insecta
- Order: Diptera
- Family: Dolichopodidae
- Subfamily: Hydrophorinae
- Tribe: Hydrophorini
- Genus: Oedematopus; Van Duzee, 1929

Type species
- Oedematopus crassitibia Van Duzee, 1929

Genus of flies

The plant genus Oedematopus is nowadays a synonym of Clusia.

Oedematopus is a genus of flies in family Dolichopodidae.

== Species ==
- Oedematopus crassitibia Van Duzee, 1929
- Oedematopus moraviensis Naglis, 2011
- Oedematopus vidua (Becker, 1922)
