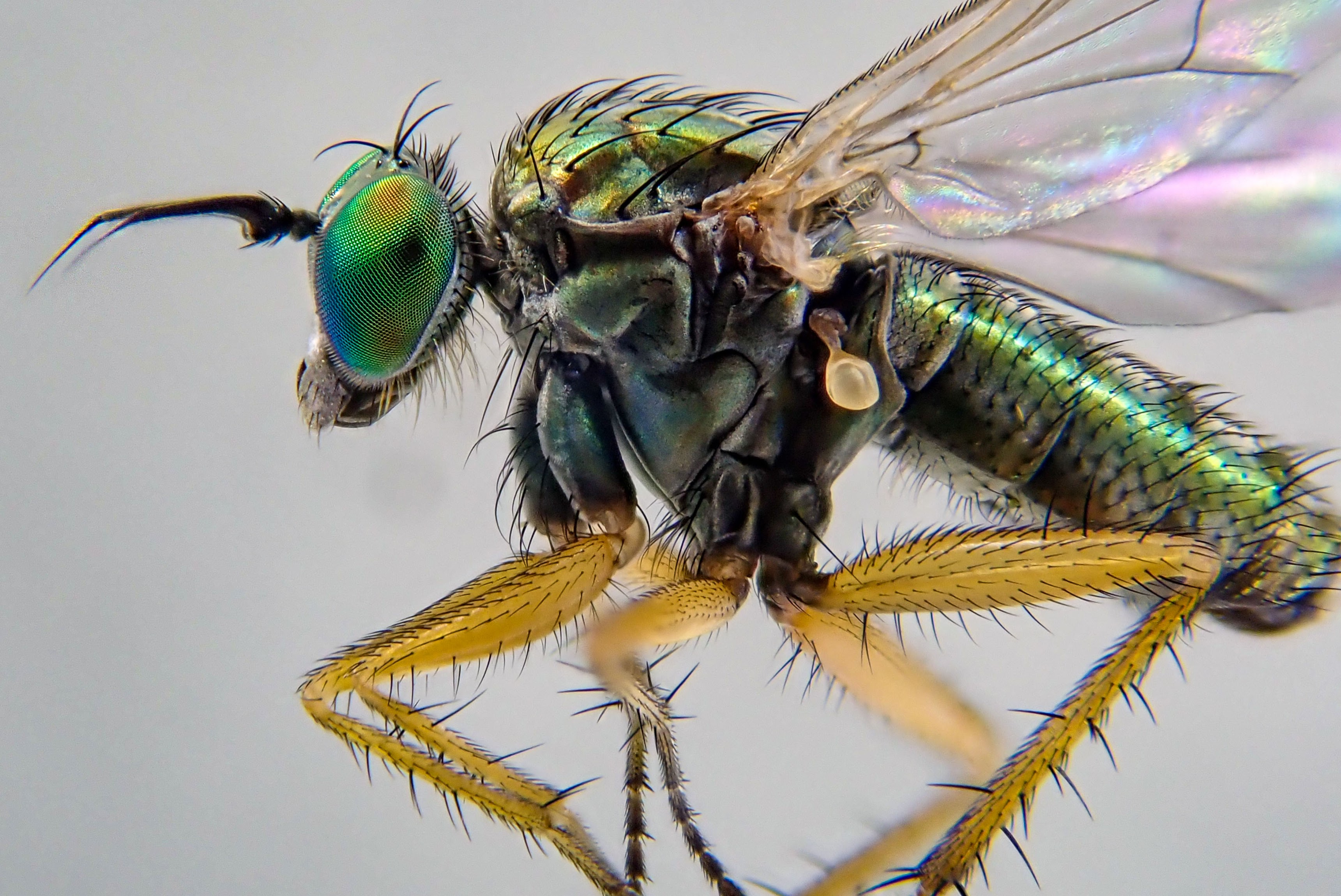
- Machaerium maritimae, Langstone Bridge, Hayling Island

Scientific classification
- Kingdom: Animalia
- Phylum: Arthropoda
- Clade: Pancrustacea
- Class: Insecta
- Order: Diptera
- Family: Dolichopodidae
- Subfamily: Hydrophorinae
- Tribe: Thinophilini
- Genus: Machaerium; Haliday, 1832

Type species
- Machaerium maritimae Haliday, 1832

Synonyms
- Macherium Rondani, 1856 (unjustified emendation); Smiliotus Loew, 1857

= Machaerium (fly) =

Genus of flies

Machaerium is a genus of flies in the family Dolichopodidae. It is distributed in the Western Palaearctic, with a single record from Tanzania in the Afrotropics.

== Species ==
- Machaerium maritimae Haliday, 1832 – Europe, North Africa
- Machaerium sordidum Becker, 1908 – Canary Islands
- Machaerium thinophilum (Loew, 1857) – Italy, Croatia, Tanzania

Machaerium henanense Yang & Grootaert, 1999 has been renamed to Nepalomyia hui Yang & Wang, 2006
