= George C. Wheeler =

American entomologist (1897–1991)

George Carlos Wheeler
- Born: 1897
- Died: 1991 (aged 93–94)
- Education: Rice University; Bussey Institution (Harvard)
- Spouses: Esther Hall (died 1944); Jeanette Norris Wheeler (m. 1946)
- Scientific career
- Workplaces: University of North Dakota

George Carlos Wheeler (1897–1991) was an entomologist who specialized in the study of ants.

== Career life ==
=== Early life ===
Wheeler was born in 1897. He attended the Rice Institute in Houston, Texas, and worked under Julian Sorell Huxley and Hermann J. Muller. He received a Bachelor of Arts degree in 1918, after which he attended the Bussey Institution of Harvard University, in Cambridge, Massachusetts. He studied entomology and earned a Master of Science degree in 1920, and a D.Sc. in 1921.

=== Career ===
After receiving his Ph.D. in entomology, Wheeler worked as an instructor and assistant professor at Syracuse University, in Syracuse, New York, from 1921 to 1926. Afterwards, he joined the University of North Dakota, where he continued to work throughout his career, holding such positions as Professor of Biology, Head of the Department of Biology, and University Professor.

Wheeler began studying ants at the Barro Colorado Island research station in the Panama Canal in 1924, having been urged to go to the tropics by William Morton Wheeler, who had mentored him at Harvard together with Charles Thomas Brues. He worked extensively on analyzing the morphology and taxonomy of the larvae of ants, as well as studying the ants of North Dakota and the desert.

Wheeler retired in 1967. The University of North Dakota appointed him a University Emeritus Professor of Biology. He was also given the title of Research Associate of the Desert Research Institute by the University of Nevada.

== Honors ==
He was elected in 1940 a fellow of the Entomological Society of America (ESA).

== Family ==
He married a fellow D.Sc. student, Esther Hall, who died in 1944. In 1946, he married Jeanette Norris Wheeler.

== Death ==
He died in 1991.

== Publications ==
- Wheeler, George Carlos; Wheeler, Jeanette (1973). Ants of Deep Canyon. Palm Desert, CA: Philip L. Boyd Deep Canyon Desert Research Center (a unit of the University of California Natural Reserve System, University of California, Riverside). p. 162. LCCN 73088149. OCLC 800855.
