= Cemocarus =

Scientific classification
- Kingdom: Animalia
- Phylum: Arthropoda
- Clade: Pancrustacea
- Class: Insecta
- Order: Diptera
- Family: Dolichopodidae
- Subfamily: Hydrophorinae
- Genus: Cemocarus; Meuffels & Grootaert 1984

Type species
- Aphrosylus griseatus Curran, 1926

Genus of flies

Cemocarus is a genus of flies in the family Dolichopodidae. It is known from South Africa and Namibia.

== Species ==
- Cemocarus griseatus (Curran, 1926) (Synonyms: Aphrosylus griseatus Curran, 1926, Cymatopus capensis Parent, 1939)
- Cemocarus stuckenbergi Grichanov, 1997
