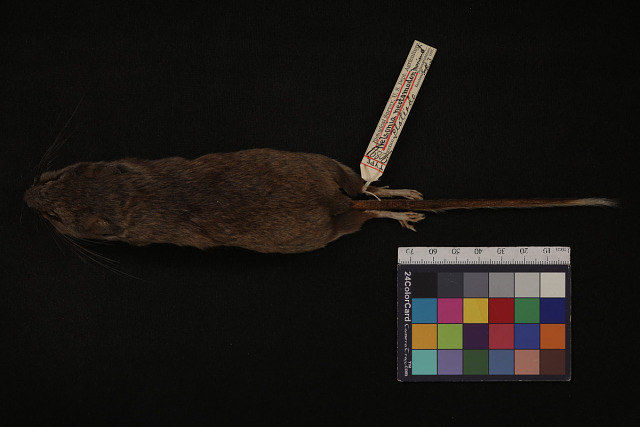
- Nelsonia neotomodon

Scientific classification
- Kingdom: Animalia
- Phylum: Chordata
- Class: Mammalia
- Order: Rodentia
- Family: Cricetidae
- Subfamily: Neotominae
- Tribe: Neotomini
- Genus: Nelsonia; Merriam, 1897

Type species
- Nelsonia neotomodon Merriam, 1897

Species
- Nelsonia goldmani Merriam, 1903; Nelsonia neotomodon Merriam, 1897

= Nelsonia (rodent) =

Genus of rodents

Nelsonia is a genus of rodent in the family Cricetidae, found in Mexico. It contains the following species:

- Goldman's diminutive woodrat (Nelsonia goldmani)
- Diminutive woodrat (Nelsonia neotomodon)
