= Sadao Takagi =

Japanese entomologist (born 1932)

Sadao Takagi (高木 貞夫, Takagi Sadao; born 1932, Toyama Prefecture, Japan) is a Japanese entomologist who has specialised in the scale insects (Coccoidea), particularly the armoured scale insects of the Diaspididae.

Takagi studied at Hokkaido University, where he received his bachelor's degree, his master's and his doctorate in agriculture. He specialized in studying the armoured scale insects. After graduation, he remained at Hokkaido University and taught, first as an associate professor and then as a full professor.

Takagi's morphological insights have been proven correct by subsequent molecular analysis. Among other things, he demonstrated the polyphyletic nature of the now-obsolete Rugaspidiotini using morphology.

Takagi retired from teaching in 1996, but continues to publish.
