= William Morton Wheeler =

U.S. entomologist, myrmecologist and Harvard professor (1865–1937)

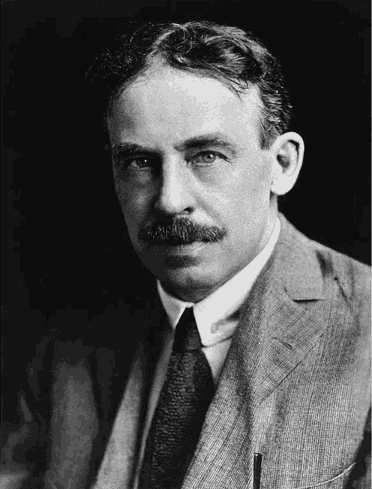
- Wheeler in 1910
- Born: March 19, 1865; Milwaukee, Wisconsin, U.S.
- Died: April 19, 1937 (aged 72); Cambridge, Massachusetts, U.S.
- Awards: Daniel Giraud Elliot Medal (1922); Leidy Award (1931)
- Scientific career
- Fields: Entomology, myrmecology
- Workplaces: Harvard University; American Museum of Natural History
- Author abbrev. (zoology): Wheeler

William Morton Wheeler (March 19, 1865 – April 19, 1937) was an American entomologist, myrmecologist and professor at Harvard University.

== Biography ==
=== Early life and education ===
William Morton Wheeler was born on March 19, 1865, to parents Julius Morton Wheeler and Caroline Georgiana Wheeler (née Anderson) in Milwaukee, Wisconsin. At a young age, Wheeler had an interest in natural history. Wheeler attended public school, but, due to "persistently bad behavior", he was transferred to a local German academy which was known for its extreme discipline. (Note: Stated by Wheeler himself.) After he completed his courses in the German academy, he attended a German normal school. In both institutions, Wheeler was trained in a variety of subjects: he was given training in languages, philosophy and science. By this time, he could read fluently in French, German, Greek, Italian, Latin and Spanish. While he was a student at the German academy, Wheeler would frequently observe the old museum of natural history at the institution.

In 1884, Henry August Ward, proprietor of the Ward's Natural Science Establishment, brought a collection of stuffed and skeletonized mammals, birds and reptiles, and also a series of marine invertebrates to the academy. This was to persuade the city fathers to purchase them and combine them with the present collection at the academy, in which it would lay the foundation for a free municipal museum of natural history. Wheeler, who had familiarized himself with the museum since childhood, volunteered to spend the nights in helping to unpack and install the specimens. Impressed by his enthusiasm, Ward offered Wheeler a job in his Rochester, New York establishment. His first duties were to identify and list birds and mammals and the preparation of catalogues. He was later made a foreman and spent most of his time identifying and arranging the collection of shells, echinoderms, and sponges, as well as preparing catalogues and price lists of these specimens for publication.

In 1885, Wheeler returned to Milwaukee to teach German and physiology at a high school. At the time, George W. Peckham was the principal of the school, in which Wheeler and Peckham formed a close working relationship. Wheeler collaborated with some of Peckham's published papers by illustrating the palpi and epigynes of spiders, and by assisting him and his wife with their field work on wasps. Wheeler was also under the influence of C.O. Whitman and William Patten, who were embryologists at the Allis Lake Laboratory in Milwaukee. He was inspired by Patten to study insect embryology and did so for several years. During this time, Wheeler left the high school in 1887 and become a custodian at Milwaukee Public Museum, a position he held until 1890. He studied embryology at home and after work hours, in which he had set up a small laboratory. He left Milwaukee after leaving the museum to assist Whitman at Clark University, and, by 1892, secured a doctorate in philosophy; his dissertation was "Contribution to Insect Embryology". At the same time, Wheeler commenced his work on insects and published around 10 entomological papers, which presented himself as a candidate for the degree of Ph.D. After receiving a call from the University of Chicago, Whitman subsequently accepted their offer, followed by Wheeler who was appointed under him as instructor in embryology in 1892. He held this position until 1897, where he became the assistant professor in his chosen field. Before he began his duties at Chicago, Wheeler was given a year's absence, allowing him to study in Europe between 1893 and 1894. There, he first spent time at the Zoological Institute at the University of Würzburg as a student, and also at the Naples Zoological Station. Enamoured by the fauna of Naples, Wheeler studied the sex life of Myzostoma, a subject he further studied at the Institut Zoologique at Liege, Belgium. His monograph on Myzostoma was published in 1897 by professor E. Van Beneden in the Archives de Biologie.

=== Career ===
In 1894 Wheeler returned to the University of Chicago where he was a teacher of embryology for five years. He continued to publish papers, half of which involved insects. In 1898, Wheeler married Dora Bay Emerson in Chicago, where they had met earlier. In 1899, he was offered the "Professorship In Zoology" following the death of professor Norman of the University of Texas. There, he took the opportunity to reorganize the department as professor of zoology. He remained there until 1903, but during this period was when Wheeler developed an interest in the behavior and classification of ants. The ants would eventually become the predominant group of insects he studied. His two children were also born in Rockford, Illinois while he was staying in Texas.

A number of students sought to study under Wheeler; notable entomologists such as C. T. Brues and A. L. Melander made their way to Austin and spent several years studying there in his laboratory. This began an influx of young students, both who were pupils and scientific associates, to study and research for long periods of time under his guidance. Other students include C. L. Metcalf, T. B. Mitchell, O. E. Plath, George Salt, Alfred C. Kinsey, George C. Wheeler, Frank M. Carpenter, William S. Creighton, Neal A. Weber, J. G. Myers, William M. Mann, Marston Bates and Philip J. Darlington.

In 1903, Wheeler resigned from his position at the University of Texas and accepted the position "Curator of Invertebrate Zoology" at the American Museum of Natural History in New York City.

Wheeler was elected to the American Academy of Arts and Sciences in 1909 and the United States National Academy of Sciences in 1912.

A close contact of the British myrmecologist and coleopterist Horace Donisthorpe, it was to Wheeler whom Donisthorpe dedicated his first major book on ants in 1915. Donisthorpe and Wheeler also frequently exchanged specimens, leading the latter to first develop the idea that the Formicinae subfamily had its origins in North America.

Wheeler was elected to the American Philosophical Society in 1916.

For his work, Ants of the American Museum Congo Expedition, Wheeler was awarded the Daniel Giraud Elliot Medal from the National Academy of Sciences in 1922. He was professor of applied biology at Harvard University's Bussey Institute, which had one of the most highly regarded biology programs in the United States.

In 1924 he spent about two months in Panama with Dr. Nathan Banks, collecting invertebrates around Barro Colorado and along the railroad in the vicinity of Panama City. Wheeler led the Harvard Australian Expedition (1931–1932) on behalf of the Harvard Museum of Comparative Zoology, a six-man venture sent for the dual purpose of procuring specimens - the museum being "weak in Australian animals and...desires[ing] to complete its series" - and to engage in "the study of the animals of the region when alive." The mission was success with over 300 mammal and thousands of insect specimens returning to the United States.

Wheeler was elected in 1901 a fellow of the American Association for the Advancement of Science and in 1906 a fellow of the Entomological Society of America.

A species of gecko, Nephrurus wheeleri, is named in his honor.

His work includes 467 titles.

== Bibliography ==
- Wheeler, W.M. (1910). Ants: Their Structure, Development and Behavior (PDF). Columbia University Biological Series. Vol. 9. Columbia University Press.
  - Cockerell, T. D. A. (1910). "Review". Science. New Series. 31 (805): 860–862. doi:10.1126/science.31.805.860-a. ISSN 0036-8075. JSTOR 1635969.
  - Parker, G. H. (1910). "Review". The American Naturalist. 44 (521): 319–320. doi:10.1086/279146. ISSN 0003-0147. JSTOR 2455589.
