= Hydrophorinae =

- Hydrophorus nebulosus, North Wales

Scientific classification
- Kingdom: Animalia
- Phylum: Arthropoda
- Clade: Pancrustacea
- Class: Insecta
- Order: Diptera
- Family: Dolichopodidae
- Subfamily: Hydrophorinae; Lioy, 1864

Genera
- see text

Synonyms
- Aphrosylinae Aldrich, 1905

Subfamily of flies

Hydrophorinae is a subfamily of flies in the family Dolichopodidae. Several molecular phylogenetic analyses of the family have found evidence that the subfamily in its current sense is polyphyletic.

== Genera ==
- Tribe Hydrophorini Lioy, 1864
  - Abatetia Miller, 1945
  - Anahydrophorus Becker, 1917
  - Aphrosylopsis Lamb, 1909
  - Coracocephalus Mik, 1892
  - Diostracus Loew, 1861
    - Lagodechia Negrobov & Zurikov, 1996
    - Ozmena Özdikmen, 2010
    - Sphyrotarsus Mik, 1874
  - Eucoryphus Mik, 1869
  - Helichochaetus Parent, 1933
  - Hydatostega Philippi, 1865
  - Hydrophorus Fallén, 1823
  - Liancalomima Stackelberg, 1931
  - Liancalus Loew, 1857
  - Melanderia Aldrich, 1922
  - Oedematopiella Naglis, 2011
  - Oedematopus Van Duzee, 1929
  - Orthoceratium Schrank, 1803
  - Paraliancalus Parent, 1938
  - Paraliptus Bezzi, 1923
  - Rhynchoschizus Dyte, 1980
  - Scellus Loew, 1857
  - Scorpiurus Parent, 1933
- Tribe Aphrosylini Aldrich, 1905
  - Acymatopus Takagi, 1965
  - Aphrosylus Haliday in Walker, 1851
  - Cemocarus Meuffels & Grootaert, 1984
  - Conchopus Takagi, 1965 (sometimes a synonym of Thambemyia)
  - Cymatopus Kertész, 1901
  - Paraphrosylus Becker, 1922
  - Teneriffa Becker, 1908
  - Thambemyia Oldroyd, 1956
    - Prothambemyia Masunaga, Saigusa & Grootaert, 2005
  - Thinolestris Grootert & Meuffels, 1988
- Tribe Epithalassiini Grichanov, 2008
  - Epithalassius Mik, 1891
  - Peodes Loew, 1857
- Tribe Hypocharassini Negrobov, 1981
  - Hypocharassus Mik, 1879
- Tribe Thinophilini Aldrich, 1905
  - Machaerium Haliday, 1832
  - Nanothinophilus Grootaert & Meuffels, 1998
  - Paralleloneurum Becker, 1902
  - Thinophilus Wahlberg, 1844
    - Parathinophilus Parent, 1932
    - Schoenophilus Mik, 1878
- Mangrovomyia Grichanov & Gilasian, 2023
- Minjerribah Bickel, 2019
