= List of kerivoulines =

Species in mammal subfamily Kerivoulinae

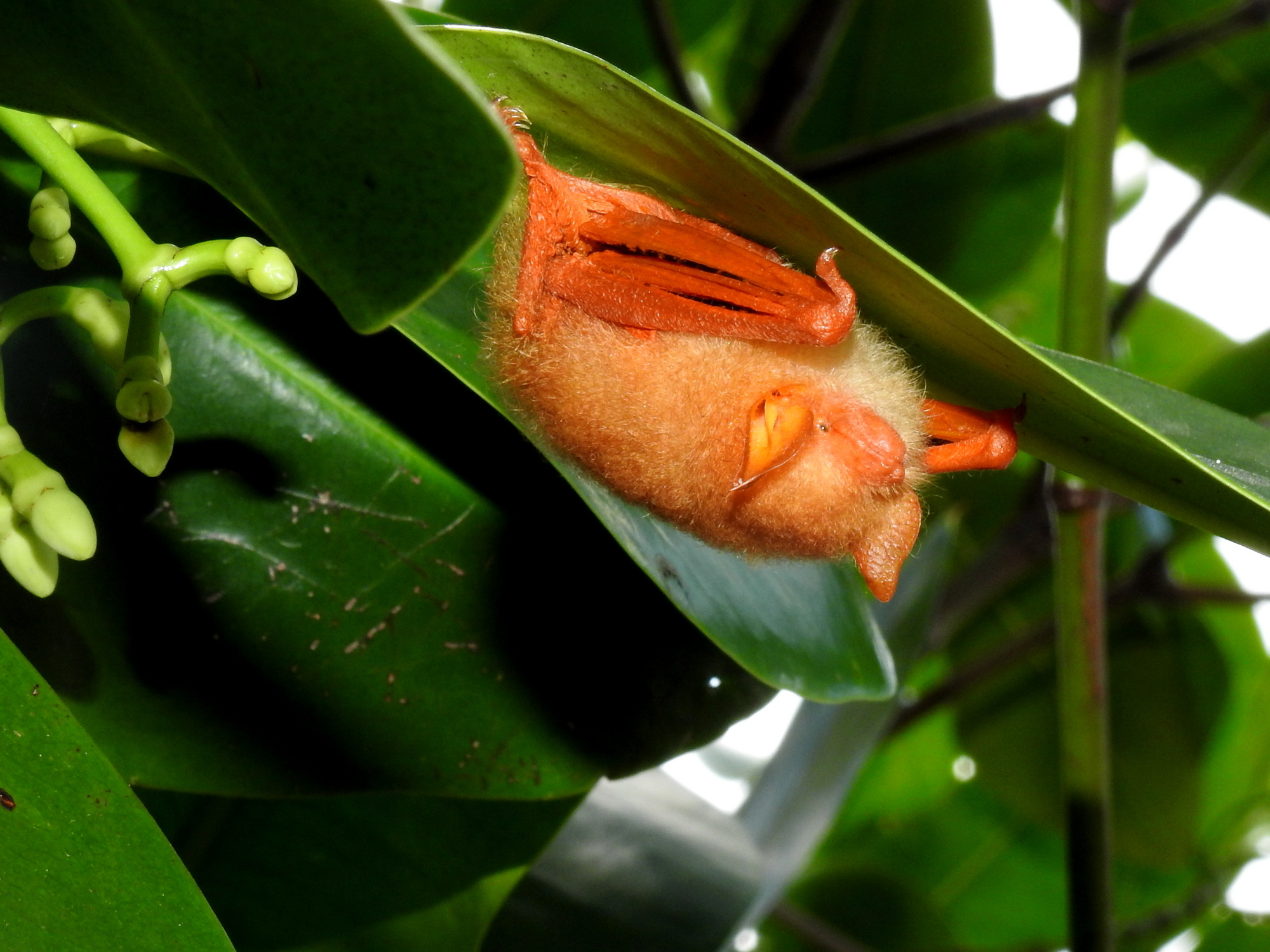
Painted bat (Kerivoula picta)

Kerivoulinae is one of the four subfamilies of Vespertilionidae, itself one of twenty families of bats in the mammalian order Chiroptera and part of the microbat suborder. A member of this subfamily is called a kerivouline, or a woolly bat. They are found mostly in Africa and Asia, with one species also found in Australia, primarily in forests and caves, though some species can also be found in grasslands, savannas, or wetlands. They range in size from the least woolly bat, at 2 cm (1 in) plus a 2 cm (1 in) tail, to the Kachin woolly bat, at 6 cm (2 in) plus a 7 cm (3 in) tail. Like all bats, kerivoulines are capable of true and sustained flight, and have forearm lengths ranging from 2 cm (1 in) to 5 cm (2 in). They are all insectivorous and eat a variety of insects and spiders. Almost no kerivoulines have population estimates, though two species—the St. Aignan's trumpet-eared bat and the Tanzanian woolly bat—are categorized as endangered species with population sizes as low as 600.

The 32 extant species of Kerivoulinae are divided between two genera: Kerivoula with 26 species, and Phoniscus with the other four. A few extinct prehistoric kerivouline species have been discovered, though due to ongoing research and discoveries the exact number and categorization is not fixed.

== Conventions ==
IUCN Red List categories
Conservation status
- EX: Extinct (0 species)
- EW: Extinct in the wild (0 species)
- CR: Critically endangered (0 species)
- EN: Endangered (2 species)
- VU: Vulnerable (3 species)
- NT: Near threatened (6 species)
- LC: Least concern (16 species)

Other categories
- DD: Data deficient (3 species)
- NE: Not evaluated (2 species)

The author citation for the species or genus is given after the scientific name; parentheses around the author citation indicate that this was not the original taxonomic placement. Conservation status codes listed follow the International Union for Conservation of Nature (IUCN) Red List of Threatened Species. Range maps are provided wherever possible; if a range map is not available, a description of the kerivouline's range is provided. Ranges are based on the IUCN Red List for that species unless otherwise noted. Population figures are rounded to the nearest hundred.

== Classification ==
Kerivoulinae, one of the four subfamilies of the family Vespertilionidae, contains 32 extant species divided into 2 genera.

Subfamily Kerivoulinae

- Genus Kerivoula (woolly bats): 28 species
- Genus Phoniscus (trumpet-eared bats): four species

== Kerivoulines ==
The following classification is based on the taxonomy described by the reference work Mammal Species of the World (2005), with augmentation by generally accepted proposals made since using molecular phylogenetic analysis, as supported by both the IUCN SSC Bat Specialist Group and the American Society of Mammalogists.

Genus Kerivoula – Gray, 1842 – 26 species
Common name	Scientific name and subspecies	Range	Size and ecology	IUCN status and estimated population
Bismarck trumpet-eared bat	K. myrella Thomas, 1914	Manus Island in Papua New Guinea	Size: 3–4 cm (1–2 in), plus 3–5 cm (1–2 in) tail 3–4 cm (1–2 in) forearm length Habitat: Forest	VU 1,500–2,000
Bornean woolly bat	K. pusilla Thomas, 1894	Southeastern Asia	Size: About 3 cm (1 in), plus about 4 cm (2 in) tail about 3 cm (1 in) forearm length Habitat: Grassland and forest	NE Unknown
Clear-winged woolly bat	K. pellucida (Waterhouse, 1845)	Southeastern Asia	Size: 3–5 cm (1–2 in), plus 4–6 cm (2 in) tail 2–4 cm (1–2 in) forearm length Habitat: Forest	NT Unknown
Copper woolly bat	K. cuprosa Thomas, 1861	Central and western Africa	Size: 3–4 cm (1–2 in), plus 4–5 cm (2 in) tail 3–4 cm (1–2 in) forearm length Habitat: Forest	DD Unknown
Cryptic woolly bat	K. crypta Wroughton & Ryley, 1913	Southern India and Sri Lanka	Size: About 4 cm (2 in), plus about 4 cm (2 in) tail about 3 cm (1 in) forearm length Habitat: Forest and caves	LC Unknown
Damara woolly bat	K. argentata Tomes, 1861 Three subspecies: K. a. argentata; K. a. nidicola; K. a. zuluensis	Southeastern Africa	Size: 3–5 cm (1–2 in), plus 4–6 cm (2 in) tail 2–4 cm (1–2 in) forearm length Habitat: Savanna	LC Unknown
Dark woolly bat	K. furva Kuo, Soisook, Ho, Csorba, Wang, & Rossiter, 2017	Eastern and southeastern Asia	Size: Unknown length, plus 3–5 cm (1–2 in) tail 3–4 cm (1–2 in) forearm length Habitat: Forest and caves	LC Unknown
Ethiopian woolly bat	K. eriophora (Heuglin, 1877)	Ethiopia	Size: About 5 cm (2 in), plus about 3 cm (1 in) tail 2–4 cm (1–2 in) forearm length Habitat: Unknown	DD Unknown
Flat-skulled woolly bat	K. depressa Miller, 1906	Southeastern Asia	Size: About 3 cm (1 in), plus about 4 cm (2 in) tail 3–4 cm (1–2 in) forearm length Habitat: Forest and caves	LC Unknown
Flores woolly bat	K. flora Thomas, 1914	Indonesia and Malaysia	Size: About 4 cm (2 in), plus about 5 cm (2 in) tail 3–4 cm (1–2 in) forearm length Habitat: Forest	VU Unknown
Fly River trumpet-eared bat	K. muscina Tate, 1941	Papua New Guinea	Size: 3–5 cm (1–2 in), plus 3–5 cm (1–2 in) tail 3–4 cm (1–2 in) forearm length Habitat: Forest	LC Unknown
Hardwicke's woolly bat	K. hardwickii (Horsfield, 1824)	Southeastern Asia	Size: 3–5 cm (1–2 in), plus 3–5 cm (1–2 in) tail 2–4 cm (1–2 in) forearm length Habitat: Forest and caves	LC Unknown
Indochinese woolly bat	K. dongduongana Tu, Hassanin, Furey, Son, & Csorba, 2018	Southeastern Asia	Size: Unknown length, plus about 4 cm (2 in) tail 3–4 cm (1–2 in) forearm length Habitat: Forest and caves	LC Unknown
Kachin woolly bat	K. kachinensis Bates, Struebig, Rossiter, Kingston, Oo, & Mya, 2004	Southeastern Asia	Size: 4–6 cm (2 in), plus 5–7 cm (2–3 in) tail 4–5 cm (2 in) forearm length Habitat: Forest	LC Unknown
Krau woolly bat	K. krauensis Francis, Kingston, & Zubaid, 2007	Southeastern Asia	Size: 3–4 cm (1–2 in), plus 3–5 cm (1–2 in) tail 2–4 cm (1–2 in) forearm length Habitat: Forest	NT Unknown
Least woolly bat	K. minuta Miller, 1898	Indonesia and Malaysia	Size: 2–3 cm (1 in), plus 2–5 cm (1–2 in) tail 3–4 cm (1–2 in) forearm length Habitat: Forest	NT Unknown
Lenis woolly bat	K. lenis Thomas, 1916	Southern and southeastern Asia	Size: 4–5 cm (2 in), plus 4–6 cm (2 in) tail 3–5 cm (1–2 in) forearm length Habitat: Forest	LC Unknown
Lesser woolly bat	K. lanosa (A. Smith, 1847) Four subspecies: K. l. harrisoni; K. l. lanosa; K. l. lucia; K. l. muscilla	Sub-Saharan Africa	Size: 4–5 cm (2 in), plus 3–5 cm (1–2 in) tail 3–4 cm (1–2 in) forearm length Habitat: Savanna and forest	LC Unknown
Painted bat	K. picta (Pallas, 1767) Two subspecies: K. p. bellissima; K. p. picta	Southern and southeastern Asia	Size: 4–5 cm (2 in), plus 3–5 cm (1–2 in) tail 3–4 cm (1–2 in) forearm length Habitat: Forest and grassland	NT Unknown
Papillose woolly bat	K. papillosa Temminck, 1840 Two subspecies: K. p. malayana; K. p. papillosa	Southeastern Asia	Size: 4–6 cm (2 in), plus 4–6 cm (2 in) tail 3–5 cm (1–2 in) forearm length Habitat: Forest	LC Unknown
Small woolly bat	K. intermedia Hill & Francis, 1984	Malaysia	Size: 3–4 cm (1–2 in), plus 3–5 cm (1–2 in) tail 2–4 cm (1–2 in) forearm length Habitat: Forest	NT Unknown
Smith's woolly bat	K. smithii Thomas, 1880	Central Africa	Size: 3–5 cm (1–2 in), plus 4–5 cm (2 in) tail 3–4 cm (1–2 in) forearm length Habitat: Forest	LC Unknown
Spurrell's woolly bat	K. phalaena Thomas, 1912	Central Africa	Size: 3–4 cm (1–2 in), plus 3–5 cm (1–2 in) tail 2–3 cm (1 in) forearm length Habitat: Forest	LC Unknown
Sri Lankan woolly bat	K. malpasi Phillips, 1932	Sri Lanka	Size: 3–6 cm (1–2 in), plus 3–5 cm (1–2 in) tail 3–4 cm (1–2 in) forearm length Habitat: Forest and caves	NE Unknown
St. Aignan's trumpet-eared bat	K. agnella Thomas, 1908	Papua New Guinea	Size: 4–5 cm (2 in), plus about 5 cm (2 in) tail 3–4 cm (1–2 in) forearm length Habitat: Forest	EN 600–750
Tanzanian woolly bat	K. africana Dobson, 1878	Tanzania	Size: About 4 cm (2 in), plus about 3 cm (1 in) tail about 3 cm (1 in) forearm length Habitat: Forest	EN Unknown
Titania's woolly bat	K. titania Bates, Struebig, Hayes, Furey, Mya, Thong, Tien, Son, Harrison, Francis, & Csorba, 2007	Southeastern Asia	Size: 3–5 cm (1–2 in), plus 4–6 cm (2 in) tail 3–4 cm (1–2 in) forearm length Habitat: Forest	LC Unknown
Whitehead's woolly bat	K. whiteheadi Thomas, 1894 Two subspecies: K. w. bicolor; K. w. whiteheadi	Southeastern Asia	Size: 3–5 cm (1–2 in), plus 2–5 cm (1–2 in) tail 2–4 cm (1–2 in) forearm length Habitat: Grassland and forest	LC Unknown

Genus Phoniscus – Miller, 1905 – four species
Common name	Scientific name and subspecies	Range	Size and ecology	IUCN status and estimated population
Dubious trumpet-eared bat	P. aerosa (Tomes, 1858)	Possibly southeastern Africa	Size: 4–6 cm (2 in), plus 3–5 cm (1–2 in) tail about 4 cm (2 in) forearm length Habitat: Forest	DD Unknown
Golden-tipped bat	P. papuensis (Dobson, 1878)	Papua New Guinea and eastern Australia	Size: 4–6 cm (2 in), plus 3–5 cm (1–2 in) tail 3–4 cm (1–2 in) forearm length Habitat: Forest	VU Unknown
Groove-toothed bat	P. atrox Miller, 1905	Southeastern Asia	Size: About 4 cm (2 in), plus 2–4 cm (1–2 in) tail 3–4 cm (1–2 in) forearm length Habitat: Forest	NT Unknown
Peters's trumpet-eared bat	P. jagorii (Peters, 1866)	Southeastern Asia	Size: 4–5 cm (2 in), plus 3–5 cm (1–2 in) tail 3–5 cm (1–2 in) forearm length Habitat: Forest and inland wetlands	LC Unknown

== Sources ==
- Chernasky, Amy; Motis, Anna; Burgin, Connor, eds. (2023). All the Mammals of the World. Lynx Nature Books. ISBN 978-84-16728-66-4.
- Simmons, Nancy B. (2005). Wilson, Don E.; Reeder, DeeAnn M. (eds.). Mammal Species of the World. Vol. 1 (3rd ed.). Johns Hopkins University Press. ISBN 978-0-8018-8221-0.
- Nowak, Ronald M. (1994). Walker's Bats of the World. Johns Hopkins University Press. ISBN 978-0-8018-4986-2.
