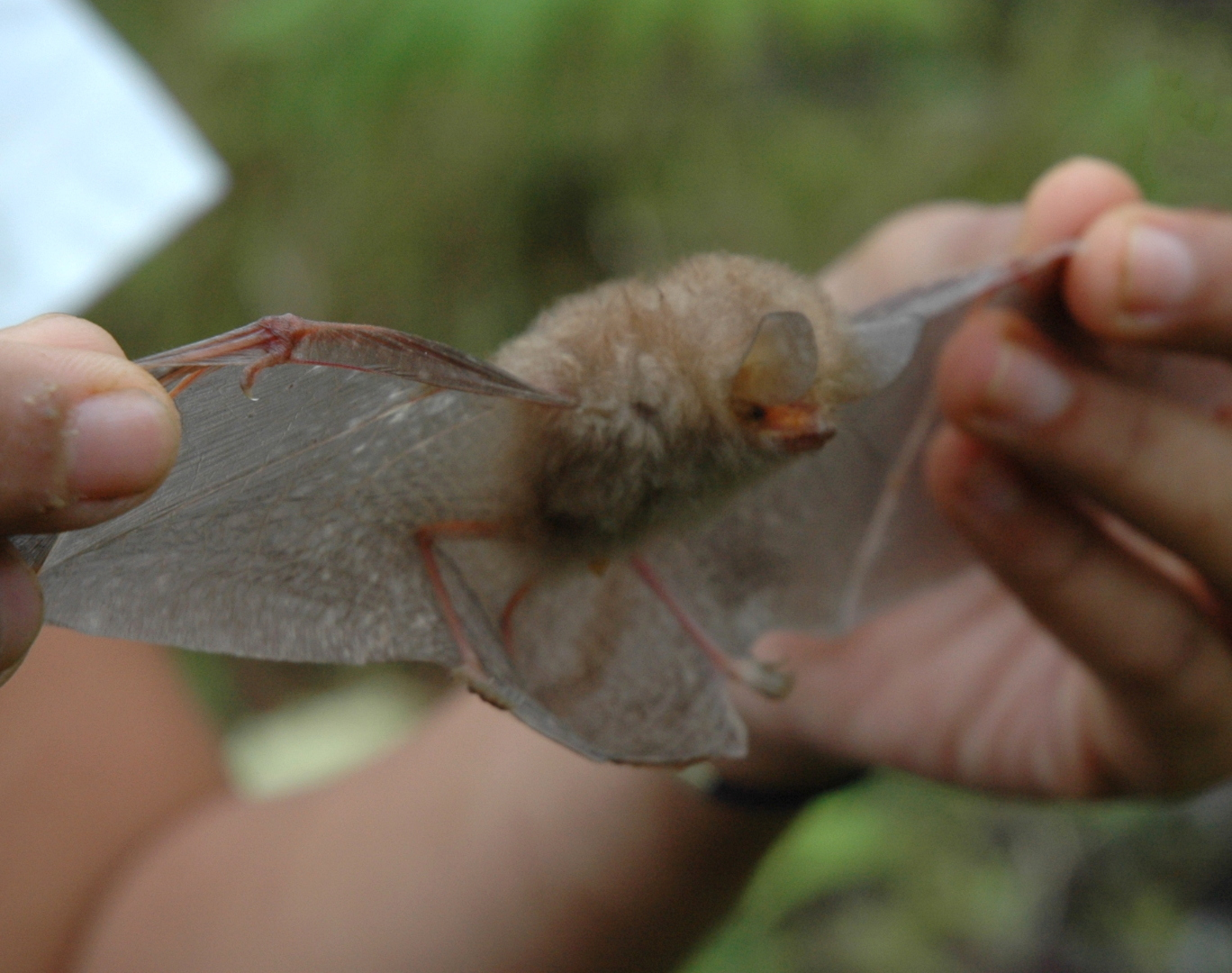
- Clear-winged woolly bat, (Kerivoula pellucida)

Scientific classification
- Kingdom: Animalia
- Phylum: Chordata
- Class: Mammalia
- Infraclass: Placentalia
- Order: Chiroptera
- Family: Vespertilionidae
- Subfamily: Kerivoulinae; Miller, 1907

Genera
- Kerivoula; Phoniscus

= Kerivoulinae =

Subfamily of bats

Kerivoulinae is a subfamily of vesper bats. There are 32 species in 2 genera within this subfamily.

== Species ==
Subfamily Kerivoulinae

- Genus Kerivoula - Painted bats
  - Tanzanian woolly bat (Kerivoula africana)
  - St. Aignan's trumpet-eared bat (Kerivoula agnella)
  - Damara woolly bat (Kerivoula argentata)
  - Cryptic woolly bat (Kerivoula crypta)
  - Copper woolly bat (Kerivoula cuprosa)
  - Flat-skulled woolly bat (Kerivoula depressa)
  - Indochinese woolly bat (Kerivoula dongduongana)
  - Ethiopian woolly bat (Kerivoula eriophora)
  - Flores woolly bat (Kerivoula flora)
  - Dark woolly bat (Kerivoula furva)
  - Hardwicke's woolly bat (Kerivoula hardwickii)
  - Small woolly bat (Kerivoula intermedia)
  - Kachin woolly bat (Kerivoula kachinensis)
  - Krau woolly bat (Kerivoula krauensis)
  - Lesser woolly bat (Kerivoula lanosa)
  - Lenis woolly bat (Kerivoula lenis)
  - Sri Lankan woolly bat (Kerivoula malpasi)
  - Least woolly bat (Kerivoula minuta)
  - Fly River trumpet-eared bat (Kerivoula muscina)
  - Bismarck's trumpet-eared bat (Kerivoula myrella)
  - Papillose woolly bat (Kerivoula papillosa)
  - Clear-winged woolly bat (Kerivoula pellucida)
  - Spurrell's woolly bat (Kerivoula phalaena)
  - Painted bat (Kerivoula picta)
  - Bornean woolly bat (K. pusilla)
  - Smith's woolly bat (Kerivoula smithii)
  - Titania's woolly bat (Kerivoula titania)
  - Whitehead's woolly bat (Kerivoula whiteheadi)
- Genus Phoniscus
  - Dubious trumpet-eared bat (Phoniscus aerosus)
  - Groove-toothed bat (Phoniscus atrox)
  - Peters's trumpet-eared bat (Phoniscus jagorii)
  - Golden-tipped bat (Phoniscus papuensis)
