= List of mammals of Brunei =

This is a list of the mammal species recorded in Brunei.

The following tags are used to highlight each species' conservation status as assessed by the International Union for Conservation of Nature:

EX	Extinct	No reasonable doubt that the last individual has died.
EW	Extinct in the wild	Known only to survive in captivity or as a naturalized populations well outside its previous range.
CR	Critically endangered	The species is in imminent risk of extinction in the wild.
EN	Endangered	The species is facing an extremely high risk of extinction in the wild.
VU	Vulnerable	The species is facing a high risk of extinction in the wild.
NT	Near threatened	The species does not meet any of the criteria that would categorise it as risking extinction but it is likely to do so in the future.
LC	Least concern	There are no current identifiable risks to the species.
DD	Data deficient	There is inadequate information to make an assessment of the risks to this species.

Some species were assessed using an earlier set of criteria. Species assessed using this system have the following instead of near threatened and least concern categories:

LR/cd	Lower risk/conservation dependent	Species which were the focus of conservation programmes and may have moved into a higher risk category if that programme was discontinued.
LR/nt	Lower risk/near threatened	Species which are close to being classified as vulnerable but are not the subject of conservation programmes.
LR/lc	Lower risk/least concern	Species for which there are no identifiable risks.

== Order: Sirenia (manatees and dugongs) ==
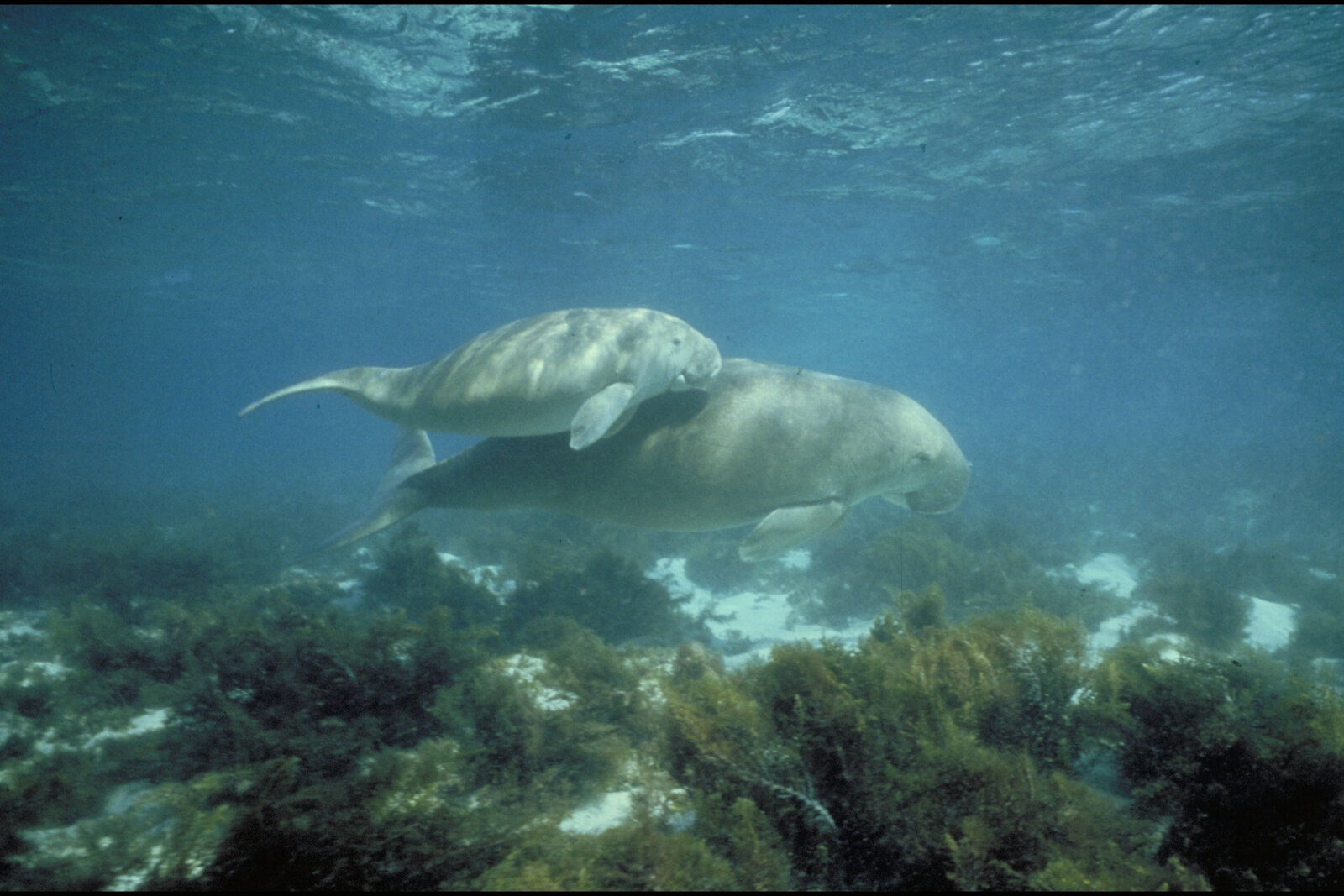
Dugong

Sirenia is an order of fully aquatic, herbivorous mammals that inhabit rivers, estuaries, coastal marine waters, swamps, and marine wetlands. All four species are endangered.

- Family: Dugongidae
  - Genus: Dugong
    - Dugong, D. dugon VU

== Order: Scandentia (treeshrews) ==
The treeshrews are small mammals native to the tropical forests of Southeast Asia. Although called treeshrews, they are not true shrews and are not all arboreal.

- Family: Tupaiidae (tree shrews)
  - Genus: Tupaia
    - Long-footed treeshrew, T. longipes LC
    - Painted treeshrew, T. picta LC
    - Large treeshrew, T. tana LC

== Order: Dermoptera (colugos) ==
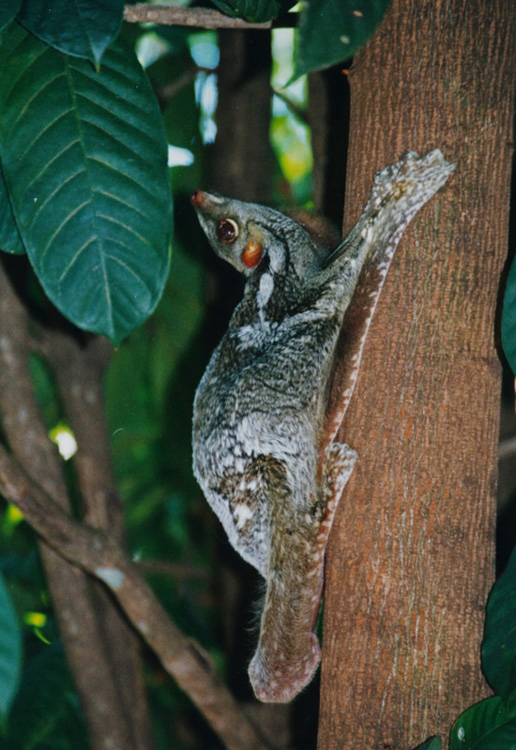
Sunda flying lemur

The two species of colugos make up the order Dermoptera. They are arboreal gliding mammals found in Southeast Asia.

- Family: Cynocephalidae (flying lemurs)
  - Genus: Galeopterus
    - Sunda flying lemur, G. variegatus LC

== Order: Primates ==
The order Primates contains humans and their closest relatives: lemurs, lorisoids, monkeys, and apes.

- Suborder: Strepsirrhini
  - Infraorder: Lemuriformes
    - Superfamily: Lorisoidea
      - Family: Lorisidae
        - Genus: Nycticebus
          - Philippine slow loris, N. menagensis VU
- Suborder: Haplorhini
  - Infraorder: Tarsiiformes
    - Family: Tarsiidae (tarsiers)
      - Genus: Cephalopachus
        - Horsfield's tarsier, C. bancanus VU
  - Infraorder: Simiiformes
    - Parvorder: Catarrhini
      - Superfamily: Cercopithecoidea
        - Family: Cercopithecidae (Old World monkeys)
          - Genus: Macaca
            - Crab-eating macaque, M. fascicularis EN
            - Southern pig-tailed macaque, M. nemestrina
          - Subfamily: Colobinae
            - Genus: Presbytis
              - Banded surili, Presbytis femoralis
              - White-fronted surili, Presbytis frontata
              - Hose's langur, Presbytis hosei
              - Maroon leaf monkey, Presbytis rubicunda
            - Genus: Nasalis
              - Proboscis monkey, N. larvatus EN
      - Superfamily: Hominoidea
        - Family: Hylobatidae (gibbons)
          - Genus: Hylobates
            - Müller's bornean gibbon, Hylobates muelleri
        - Family: Hominidae (great apes)
          - Subfamily: Ponginae
            - Genus: Pongo
              - Bornean orangutan, P. pygmaeus EN presence uncertain

== Order: Rodentia (rodents) ==
Rodents make up the largest order of mammals, with over 40% of mammalian species. They have two incisors in the upper and lower jaw which grow continually and must be kept short by gnawing. Most rodents are small though the capybara can weigh up to 45 kg (100 lb).

- Suborder: Hystricomorpha
  - Family: Hystricidae (Old World porcupines)
    - Genus: Hystrix
      - Thick-spined porcupine, Hystrix crassispinis LR/nt
      - Genus: Trichys
        - Long-tailed porcupine, Trichys fasciculata LR/lc
- Suborder: Sciurognathi
  - Family: Sciuridae (squirrels)
    - Subfamily: Ratufinae
      - Genus: Ratufa
        - Cream-coloured giant squirrel, Ratufa affinis LR/lc
    - Subfamily: Sciurinae
      - Tribe: Pteromyini
        - Genus: Aeromys
          - Black flying squirrel, Aeromys tephromelas LR/lc
        - Genus: Pteromyscus
          - Smoky flying squirrel, Pteromyscus pulverulentus LR/nt
    - Subfamily: Callosciurinae
      - Genus: Exilisciurus
        - Least pygmy squirrel, Exilisciurus exilis LR/lc
      - Genus: Rhinosciurus
        - Shrew-faced squirrel, Rhinosciurus laticaudatus LR/lc
      - Genus: Sundasciurus
        - Horse-tailed squirrel, Sundasciurus hippurus LR/lc

== Order: Erinaceomorpha (hedgehogs and gymnures) ==
The order Erinaceomorpha contains a single family, Erinaceidae, which comprise the hedgehogs and gymnures. The hedgehogs are easily recognised by their spines while gymnures look more like large rats.

- Family: Erinaceidae (hedgehogs)
  - Subfamily: Galericinae
    - Genus: Hylomys
      - Bornean short-tailed gymnure, Hylomys dorsalis

== Order: Soricomorpha (shrews, moles, and solenodons) ==
The "shrew-forms" are insectivorous mammals. The shrews and solenodons closely resemble mice while the moles are stout-bodied burrowers.

- Family: Soricidae (shrews)
  - Subfamily: Crocidurinae
    - Genus: Crocidura
      - Southeast Asian shrew, Crocidura fuliginosa LR/lc

== Order: Chiroptera (bats) ==
The bats' most distinguishing feature is that their forelimbs are developed as wings, making them the only mammals capable of flight. Bat species account for about 20% of all mammals.

- Family: Pteropodidae (flying foxes, Old World fruit bats)
  - Subfamily: Pteropodinae
    - Genus: Aethalops
      - Pygmy fruit bat, Aethalops alecto LR/nt
    - Genus: Balionycteris
      - Spotted-winged fruit bat, Balionycteris maculata LR/lc
    - Genus: Dyacopterus
      - Dayak fruit bat, Dyacopterus spadiceus LR/nt
    - Genus: Ptenochirus
      - White-collared fruit bat, Ptenochirus wetmorei LR/lc
        - Genus: Pteropus
          - Large flying fox, Pteropus vampyrus LR/lc
  - Subfamily: Macroglossinae
    - Genus: Eonycteris
      - Greater dawn bat, Eonycteris major LR/lc
- Family: Vespertilionidae
  - Subfamily: Kerivoulinae
    - Genus: Kerivoula
      - Papillose woolly bat, Kerivoula papillosa LR/lc
      - Clear-winged woolly bat, Kerivoula pellucida LR/lc
      - Painted bat, Kerivoula picta LR/lc
      - Whitehead's woolly bat, Kerivoula whiteheadi LR/lc
  - Subfamily: Vespertilioninae
    - Genus: Glischropus
      - Common thick-thumbed bat, Glischropus tylopus LR/lc
    - Genus: Hesperoptenus
      - Blanford's bat, Hesperoptenus blanfordi LR/lc
    - Genus: Hypsugo
      - Big-eared pipistrelle, Hypsugo macrotis LR/nt
    - Genus: Philetor
      - Rohu's bat, Philetor brachypterus LR/lc
    - Genus: Pipistrellus
      - Kelaart's pipistrelle, Pipistrellus ceylonicus LR/lc
      - Narrow-winged pipistrelle, Pipistrellus stenopterus LR/lc
  - Subfamily: Murininae
    - Genus: Murina
      - Brown tube-nosed bat, Murina suilla LR/lc
- Family: Emballonuridae
  - Genus: Emballonura
    - Small Asian sheath-tailed bat, Emballonura alecto LR/lc
- Family: Rhinolophidae
  - Subfamily: Rhinolophinae
    - Genus: Rhinolophus
      - Acuminate horseshoe bat, Rhinolophus acuminatus LR/lc
      - Intermediate horseshoe bat, Rhinolophus affinis LR/lc
      - Bornean horseshoe bat, Rhinolophus borneensis LR/lc
      - Woolly horseshoe bat, Rhinolophus luctus LR/lc
      - Lesser woolly horseshoe bat, Rhinolophus sedulus LR/lc
      - Trefoil horseshoe bat, Rhinolophus trifoliatus LR/lc

== Order: Pholidota (pangolins) ==
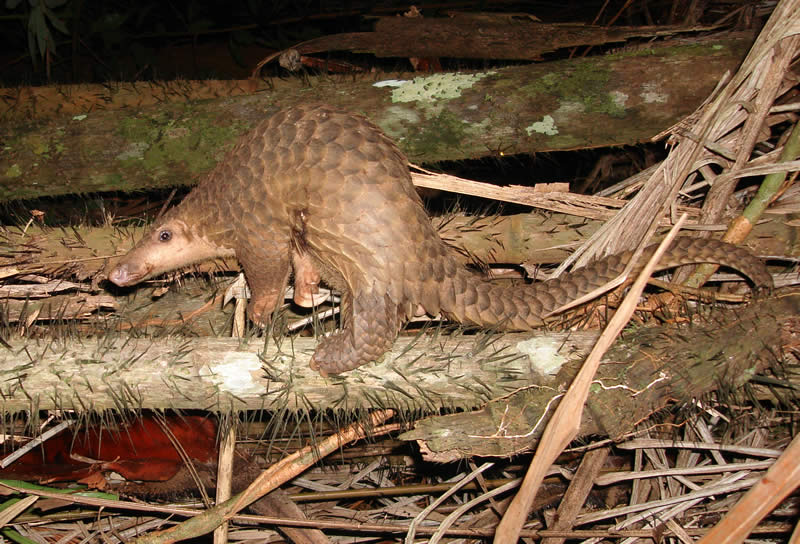
Sunda pangolin

The order Pholidota comprises the eight species of pangolin. Pangolins are anteaters and have the powerful claws, elongated snout and long tongue seen in the other unrelated anteater species.

- Family: Manidae
  - Genus: Manis
    - Sunda pangolin, M. javanica CR

== Order: Cetacea (whales) ==
The order Cetacea includes whales, dolphins and porpoises. They are the mammals most fully adapted to aquatic life with a spindle-shaped nearly hairless body, protected by a thick layer of blubber, and forelimbs and tail modified to provide propulsion underwater.

- Suborder:Mysticeti
  - Superfamily:Balaenopteroidea
    - Family:Balaenopteridae
      - Genus: Balaenoptera
        - Common minke whale, Balaenoptera acutorostrata LC
        - Antarctic minke whale, Balaenoptera bonaerensis DD
        - Sei whale, Balaenoptera borealis EN
        - Bryde's whale, Balaenoptera brydei DD
        - Blue whale, Balaenoptera musculus EN
        - Fin whale, Balaenoptera physalus EN
      - Genus: Megaptera
        - Humpback whale, Megaptera novaeangliae LC
- Suborder: Odontoceti
  - Superfamily: Platanistoidea
    - Family: Phocoenidae
      - Genus: Neophocaena
        - Finless porpoise, Neophocaena phocaenoides DD
    - Family: Delphinidae (marine dolphins)
      - Genus: Feresa
        - Pygmy killer whale, Feresa attenuata DD
      - Genus: Globicephala
        - Short-finned pilot whale, Globicephala macrorhynchus DD
      - Genus: Sousa
        - Indo-Pacific humpbacked dolphin, Sousa chinensis DD
          - Genus: Tursiops
            - Common bottlenose dolphin, Tursiops truncatus LC
            - Indo-Pacific bottlenose dolphin, Tursiops aduncus DD
      - Genus: Lagenodelphis
        - Fraser's dolphin, Lagenodelphis hosei DD
      - Genus: Grampus
        - Risso's dolphin, Grampus griseus DD
      - Genus: Orcaella
        - Irrawaddy dolphin, O. brevirostris EN
      - Genus: Orcinus
        - Orca, O. orca DD
      - Genus: Peponocephala
        - Melon-headed whale, Peponocephala electra DD
      - Genus: Pseudorca
        - False killer whale, Pseudorca crassidens DD
      - Genus: Stenella
        - Pantropical spotted dolphin, Stenella attenuata LC
        - Striped dolphin, Stenella coeruleoalba LC
        - Spinner dolphin, Stenella longirostris DD
      - Genus: Steno
        - Rough-toothed dolphin, Steno bredanensis LC
    - Family: Kogiidae
      - Genus: Kogia
        - Pygmy sperm whale, K. breviceps DD
        - Dwarf sperm whale, Kogia sima DD
  - Superfamily:Physeteroidea
    - Family: Physeteridae (sperm whales)
      - Genus: Physeter
        - Sperm whale, Physeter macrocephalus VU
  - Superfamily Ziphioidea
    - Family: Ziphidae (beaked whales)
      - Genus: Indopacetus
        - Tropical bottlenose whale, Indopacetus pacificus DD
      - Genus: Mesoplodon
        - Blainville's beaked whale, Mesoplodon densirostris DD
        - Ginkgo-toothed beaked whale, Mesoplodon ginkgodens DD
      - Genus: Ziphius
        - Cuvier's beaked whale, Ziphius cavirostris DD

== Order: Carnivora (carnivorans) ==
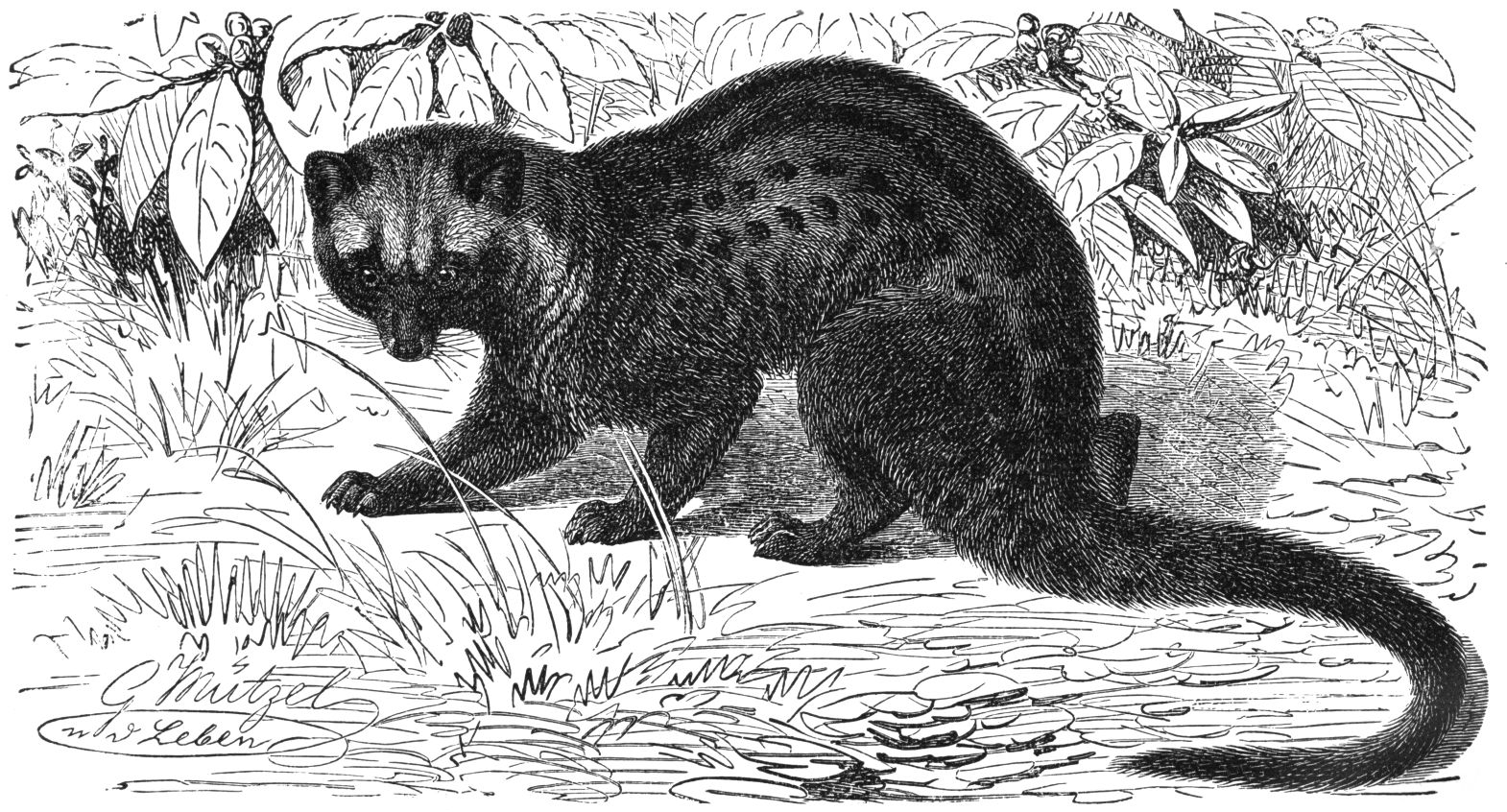
Asian palm civet

There are over 260 species of carnivorans, the majority of which feed primarily on meat. They have a characteristic skull shape and dentition.

- Suborder: Feliformia
  - Family: Felidae (cats)
    - Subfamily: Felinae
      - Genus: Catopuma
        - Bay cat, C. badia EN presence uncertain
      - Genus: Pardofelis
        - Marbled cat, P. marmorata NT
      - Genus: Prionailurus
        - Sunda leopard cat, P. javanensis
        - Flat-headed cat, P. planiceps VU
    - Subfamily: Pantherinae
      - Genus: Neofelis
        - Sunda clouded leopard, N. diardi VU
  - Family: Viverridae (civets, mongooses, etc.)
    - Subfamily: Paradoxurinae
      - Genus: Arctictis
        - Binturong, A. binturong VU
      - Genus: Arctogalidia
        - Small-toothed palm civet, A. trivirgata LC
      - Genus: Paradoxurus
        - Asian palm civet, P. hermaphroditus LC
    - Subfamily: Hemigalinae
      - Genus: Cynogale
        - Otter civet, C. bennettii EN
      - Genus: Hemigalus
        - Banded palm civet, H. derbyanus NT
    - Subfamily: Prionodontinae
      - Genus: Prionodon
        - Banded linsang, P. linsang LC
    - Subfamily: Viverrinae
      - Genus: Viverra
        - Malayan civet, V. tangalunga LC
  - Family: Herpestidae (mongooses)
    - Genus: Urva
      - Collared mongoose, U. semitorquata LC
- Suborder: Caniformia
  - Family: Ursidae (bears)
    - Genus: Helarctos
      - Sun bear, H. malayanus VU
  - Family: Mustelidae (mustelids)
    - Genus: Aonyx
      - Oriental small-clawed otter, A. cinereus NT
    - Genus: Lutra
      - Hairy-nosed otter, L. sumatrana EN possibly extirpated
    - Genus: Lutrogale
      - Smooth-coated otter, L. perspicillata VU
    - Genus: Martes
      - Yellow-throated marten, M. flavigula LC
    - Genus: Mustela
      - Malayan weasel, M. nudipes LC
    - Genus: Mydaus
      - Sunda stink badger, M. javanensis LC

== Order: Perissodactyla (odd-toed ungulates) ==
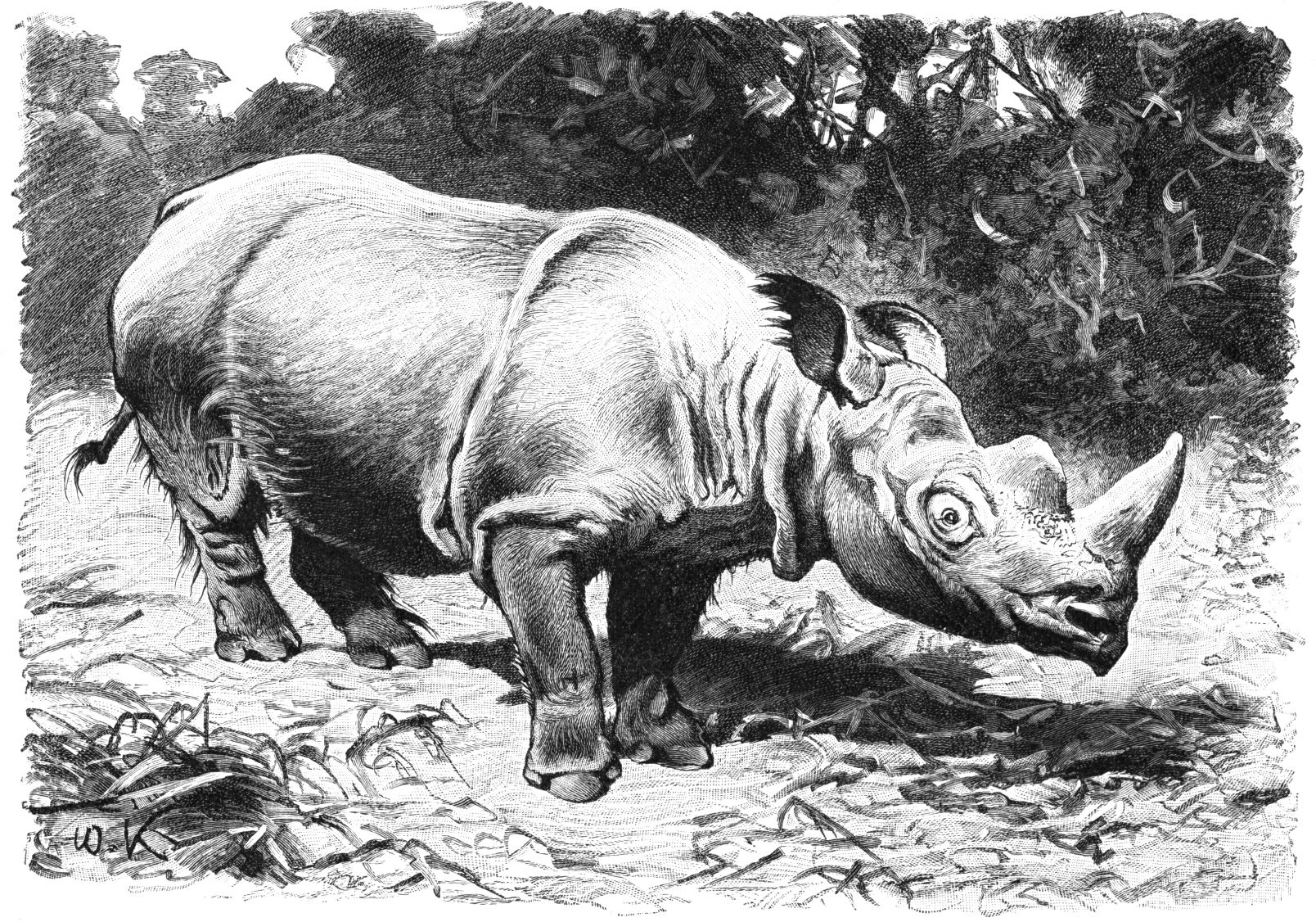
Sumatran rhinoceros

The odd-toed ungulates are browsing and grazing mammals. They are usually large to very large, and have relatively simple stomachs and a large middle toe.

- Family: Rhinocerotidae
  - Genus: Dicerorhinus
    - Sumatran rhinoceros, D. sumatrensis CR extirpated

== Order: Artiodactyla (even-toed ungulates) ==
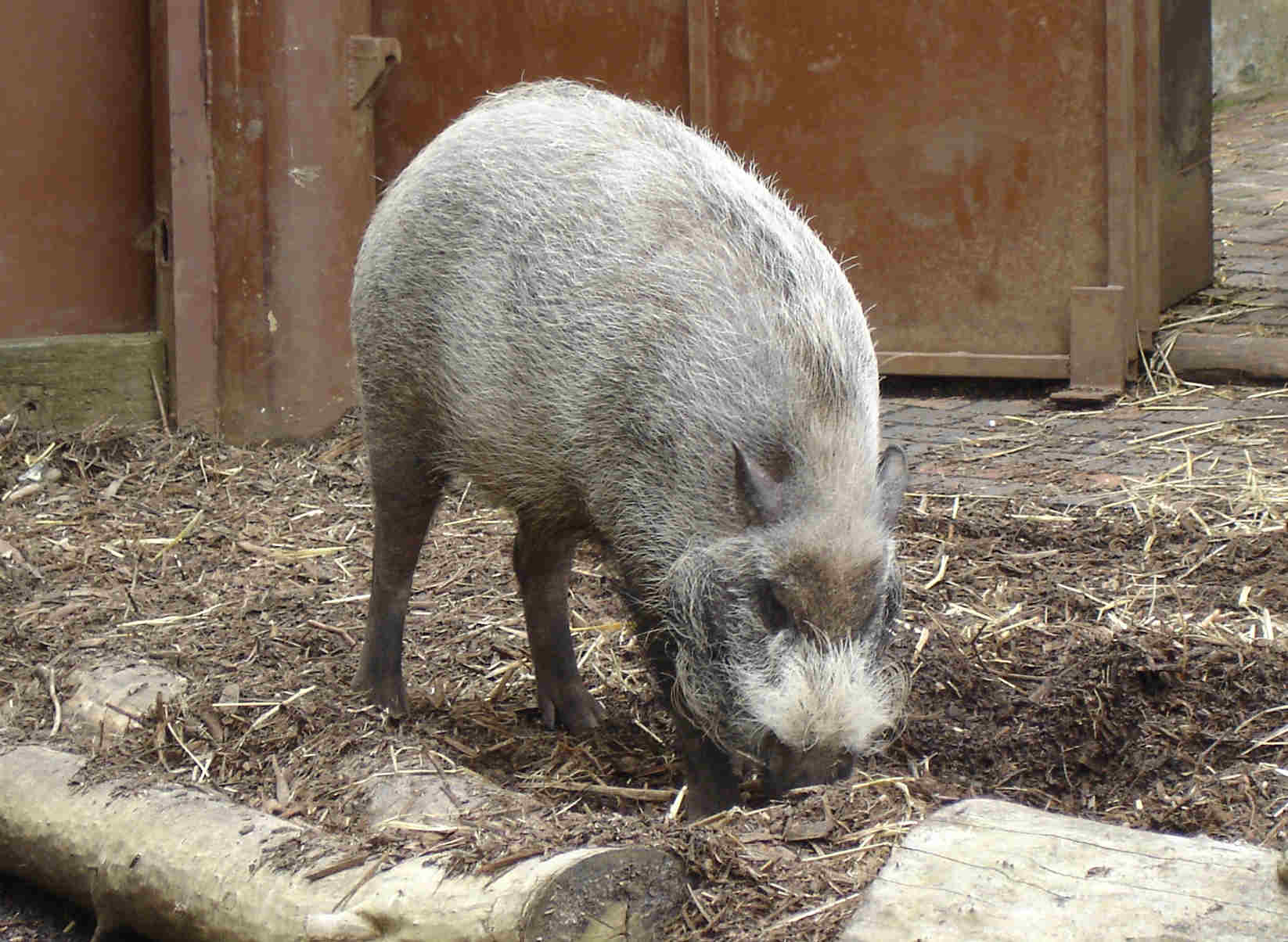
Bornean bearded pig

The even-toed ungulates are ungulates whose weight is borne about equally by the third and fourth toes, rather than mostly or entirely by the third as in perissodactyls. There are about 220 artiodactyl species, including many that are of great economic importance to humans.

- Family: Suidae (pigs)
  - Subfamily: Suinae
    - Genus: Sus
      - Bornean bearded pig, S. barbatus LC
- Family: Tragulidae
  - Genus: Tragulus
    - Lesser mouse deer, T. javanicus LC
    - Napu, T. napu LC
- Family: Bovidae (cattle, antelope, sheep, goats)
  - Subfamily: Bovinae
    - Genus: Bos
      - Banteng, B. javanicus EN extirpated

== See also ==
- List of chordate orders
- Lists of mammals by region
- Mammal classification
