= List of mammals of Cambodia =

This is a list of the mammal species recorded in Cambodia.

== Order: Artiodactyla (even-toed ungulates & cetaceans) ==
Image	Common name	Scientific name Authority	Preferred habitat	IUCN status	Range
Family Suidae: pigs
	Wild boar	Sus scrofa Linnaeus, 1758	Wide variety of habitats	LC^{IUCN} Unknown	
Family Tragulidae: mouse-deer
	Lesser mouse-deer	Tragulus kanchil Raffles, 1821	Lowland forests	LC^{IUCN} Unknown	
	Greater mouse-deer	Tragulus napu F. Cuvier, 1822	Lowland forests	LC^{IUCN} Unknown	
Family Cervidae: deer
	Indian hog deer	Axis porcinus Zimmermann, 1780	Moist tall grasslands	EN^{IUCN} ▼	
	Eld's deer	Rucervus eldii McClelland, 1842	Grasslands	EN^{IUCN} ▼	
	Sambar deer	Rusa unicolor Kerr, 1792	Wide variety of forest & savanna	VU^{IUCN} ▼	
	Indian muntjac	Muntiacus vaginalis Zimmermann, 1780	Wide variety of forests & scrublands	LC^{IUCN} ▼	
	Giant muntjac	Muntiacus vuquangensis Tuoc, Dung, Dawson, Arctander and Mackinnon, 1994	Unclear	CR^{IUCN} ▼	
Family Bovidae: cattle, antelope, sheep, goats
	Gaur	Bos gaurus Smith, 1827	Forest, grassland, shrubland, & savanna	VU^{IUCN} ▼	
	Banteng	Bos javanicus d'Alton, 1823	Forest & grassland	CR^{IUCN} ▼	
	Kouprey	Bos sauveli Urbain, 1937	Previously seen in dipterocarp forests with grasslands. No confirmations since 1970; possibly extinct.	CR^{IUCN}, possibly EX ▼	
	Wild water buffalo	Bubalus arnee Kerr, 1792	Wetlands, grasslands, and riparian forests	EN^{IUCN} ▼	
	Mainland serow	Capricornis sumatraensis Bechstein, 1799	Forested mountain slopes	VU^{IUCN} ▼	
Family Balaenopteridae: rorquals
	Common minke whale	Balaenoptera acutorostrata Lacépède, 1804	Neritic & oceanic marine zones	LC^{IUCN} Unknown	
	Sei whale	Balaenoptera borealis Lesson, 1828	Neritic & oceanic marine zones	EN^{IUCN} ▲	
	Bryde's whale	Balaenoptera edeni Anderson, 1879	Neritic & oceanic marine zones	LC^{IUCN} Unknown	
	Blue whale	Balaenoptera musculus Linnaeus, 1758	Neritic & oceanic marine zones	EN^{IUCN} ▲	
	Fin whale	Balaenoptera physalus Linnaeus, 1758	Neritic & oceanic marine zones	VU^{IUCN} ▲	
	Humpback whale	Megaptera novaeangliae Borowski, 1781	Neritic & oceanic marine zones	LC^{IUCN} ▲	
Family Phocoenidae: porpoises
	Indo-Pacific finless porpoise	Neophocaena phocaenoides G. Cuvier, 1829	Coastal waters	VU^{IUCN} ▼	
Family Delphinidae: marine dolphins
	Common dolphin	Delphinus delphis Linnaeus, 1758	Neritic & oceanic marine zones	LC^{IUCN} Unknown	
	Pygmy killer whale	Feresa attenuata J. E. Gray, 1874	Oceanic marine zone	LC^{IUCN} Unknown	
	Short-finned pilot whale	Globicephala macrorhynchus Gray, 1846	Oceanic marine zone	LC^{IUCN} Unknown	
	Risso's dolphin	Grampus griseus G. Cuvier, 1812	Oceanic marine zone	LC^{IUCN} Unknown	
	Fraser's dolphin	Lagenodelphis hosei Fraser, 1956	Neritic & oceanic marine zones	LC^{IUCN} Unknown	
	Irrawaddy dolphin	Orcaella brevirostris Owen in Gray, 1866	Coastal waters & rivers	EN^{IUCN} ▼	
	Orca	Orcinus orca Linnaeus, 1758	Neritic & oceanic marine zones	DD^{IUCN} Unknown	
	Melon-headed whale	Peponocephala electra Gray, 1846	Oceanic marine zone	LC^{IUCN} Unknown	
	False killer whale	Pseudorca crassidens Owen, 1846	Neritic & oceanic marine zones	NT^{IUCN} Unknown	
	Indo-Pacific humpback dolphin	Sousa chinensis Osbeck, 1765	Coastal waters	VU^{IUCN} ▼	
	Pantropical spotted dolphin	Stenella attenuata Gray, 1846	Neritic & oceanic marine zones	LC^{IUCN} Unknown	
	Striped dolphin	Stenella coeruleoalba Meyen, 1833	Neritic & oceanic marine zones	LC^{IUCN} Unknown	
	Spinner dolphin	Stenella longirostris Gray, 1828	Neritic & oceanic marine zones	LC^{IUCN} Unknown	
	Rough-toothed dolphin	Steno bredanensis G. Cuvier in Lesson, 1828	Neritic & oceanic marine zones	LC^{IUCN} Unknown	
	Common bottlenose dolphin	Tursiops truncatus Montagu, 1821	Coastal, neritic & oceanic marine zones	LC^{IUCN} Unknown	
	Indo-Pacific bottlenose dolphin	Tursiops aduncus Ehrenberg, 1833	Neritic & oceanic marine zones	NT^{IUCN} Unknown	
Family Physeteridae
	Sperm whale	Physeter macrocephalus Linnaeus, 1758	Neritic & oceanic marine zones	VU^{IUCN} Unknown	
Family Kogiidae
	Pygmy sperm whale	Kogia breviceps Blainville, 1838	Oceanic marine zone	LC^{IUCN} Unknown	
	Dwarf sperm whale	Kogia sima Owen, 1866	Oceanic marine zone	LC^{IUCN} Unknown	
Family Ziphidae
	Blainville's beaked whale	Mesoplodon densirostris Blainville, 1817	Oceanic marine zone	LC^{IUCN} Unknown	
	Ginkgo-toothed beaked whale	Mesoplodon ginkgodens Nishiwaki and Kamiya, 1958	Oceanic marine zone	DD^{IUCN} Unknown	
	Cuvier's beaked whale	Ziphius cavirostris Cuvier, 1823	Oceanic marine zone	LC^{IUCN} Unknown	

== Order: Carnivora (carnivorans) ==
Image	Common name	Scientific name Authority	Preferred habitat	IUCN status	Range
Family Felidae: cats
	Asian golden cat	Catopuma temminckii Vigors & Horsfield, 1827	Forest, savanna, shrubland, & grassland	NT^{IUCN} ▼	
	Jungle cat	Felis chaus Schreber, 1777	Particularly around wetlands	LC^{IUCN} ▼	
	Clouded leopard	Neofelis nebulosa Griffith, 1821	Forest & shrubland	VU^{IUCN} ▼	
	Leopard	Panthera pardus Linnaeus, 1758	Wide range of habitats	VU^{IUCN} ▼	
	Marbled cat	Pardofelis marmorata Martin, 1836	Forest	NT^{IUCN} ▼	
	Leopard cat	Prionailurus bengalensis Kerr, 1792	Forest, shrublands, & grasslands	LC^{IUCN}	
	Fishing cat	Prionailurus viverrinus Bennett, 1833	Marshlands & near waterbodies	VU^{IUCN} ▼	
Family Viverridae
	Binturong	Arctictis binturong Raffles, 1822	Forest (arboreal)	VU^{IUCN} ▼	
	Small-toothed palm civet	Arctogalidia trivirgata Gray, 1832	Evergreen & semi-evergreen forest	LC^{IUCN} ▼	
	Masked palm civet	Paguma larvata Smith, 1827	Mainly evergreen and semi-evergreen forest	LC^{IUCN} ▼	
	Asian palm civet	Paradoxurus hermaphroditus Pallas, 1777	Wide range of forest, plantation, and urban environments	LC^{IUCN} ▼	
	Large-spotted civet	Viverra megaspila Blyth, 1862	Lowland forest	EN^{IUCN} ▼	
	Large Indian civet	Viverra zibetha Linnaeus, 1758	Forests & shrublands	LC^{IUCN} ▼	
	Small Indian civet	Viverricula indica Geoffroy Saint-Hilaire, 1803	Wide range of forests & wetlands	LC^{IUCN}	
Family Prionodontidae: linsangs
	Spotted linsang	Prionodon pardicolor Hodgson, 1842	Forest, shrubland, and grassland. Present in Virachey National Park	LC^{IUCN} ▼	
Family Herpestidae: mongooses
	Javan mongoose	Urva javanica É. Geoffroy Saint-Hilaire, 1818	Widespread in lowlands, including anthropogenic habitats	LC^{IUCN} Unknown	
	Crab-eating mongoose	Urva urva Hodgson, 1836	Widespread	LC^{IUCN} ▼	
Family Canidae: dogs, foxes
	Dhole	Cuon alpinus Pallas, 1811	Forest, shrubland, & grassland	EN^{IUCN} ▼	
	Golden jackal	Canis aureus Linnaeus, 1758	Wide variety, especially lowland deciduous dipterocarp forest	LC^{IUCN} ▲	
Family Ursidae: bears
	Sun bear	Helarctos malayanus Raffles, 1821	Forest & shrubland	VU^{IUCN} ▼	
	Asian black bear	Ursus thibetanus G. Cuvier, 1823	Forest & shrubland	VU^{IUCN} ▼	
Family Mustelidae: mustelids
	Asian small-clawed otter	Aonyx cinereus Illiger, 1815	Wetland systems	VU^{IUCN} ▼	
	Greater hog badger	Arctonyx collaris Cuvier, 1825	Mainly forest	VU^{IUCN} ▼	
	Eurasian otter	Lutra lutra Linnaeus, 1758	Wide range of aquatic habitats	NT^{IUCN} ▼	
	Hairy-nosed otter	Lutra sumatrana Gray, 1865	Wide range of aquatic habitats	EN^{IUCN} ▼	
	Smooth-coated otter	Lutrogale perspicillata Geoffroy Saint Hilaire, 1826	Wide range of aquatic habitats, including flooded ricefields	VU^{IUCN} ▼	
	Yellow-throated marten	Martes flavigula Boddaert, 1785	Forests & shrublands	LC^{IUCN} ▼	
	Burmese ferret-badger	Melogale personata I. Geoffroy Saint-Hilaire, 1831	Forests, shrublands, & grasslands	LC^{IUCN} Unknown	
	Yellow-bellied weasel	Mustela kathiah Hodgson, 1835	Rugged highlands	LC^{IUCN}	

== Order: Chiroptera (bats) ==
Image	Common name	Scientific name Authority	Preferred habitat	IUCN status	Range
Family Pteropodidae: flying foxes, Old World fruit bats
	Lesser short-nosed fruit bat	Cynopterus brachyotis Müller, 1838	Forest	LC^{IUCN} Unknown	
	Greater short-nosed fruit bat	Cynopterus sphinx Vahl, 1797	Forest	LC^{IUCN} ▲	
	Cave nectar bat	Eonycteris spelaea Dobson, 1871	Caves & forest	LC^{IUCN} ▼	
	Long-tongued nectar bat	Macroglossus minimus É. Geoffroy, 1810	Forest	LC^{IUCN}	
	Long-tongued fruit bat	Macroglossus sobrinus K. Andersen, 1911	Forest	LC^{IUCN}	
	Ratanaworabhan's fruit bat	Megaerops niphanae Yenbutra & Felten, 1983	Forest	LC^{IUCN}	
	Small flying fox	Pteropus hypomelanus Temminck, 1853	Forest	NT^{IUCN} ▼	
	Lyle's flying fox	Pteropus lylei K. Andersen, 1908	Forest	VU^{IUCN} ▼	
	Large flying fox	Pteropus vampyrus Linnaeus, 1758	Forest	NT^{IUCN} ▼	
	Geoffroy's rousette	Rousettus amplexicaudatus É. Geoffroy, 1810	Caves, rocky areas, & forests	LC^{IUCN} Unknown	
	Leschenault's rousette	Rousettus leschenaultii Desmarest, 1820	Caves & forests	NT^{IUCN} ▼	
Family Vespertilionidae
	Bronze sprite	Arielulus circumdatus Temminck, 1840	Montane forest	LC^{IUCN} Unknown	
	Indochinese thick-thumbed bat	Glischropus bucephalus Csorba, 2011	Bamboo forest	LC^{IUCN} Unknown	
	Blanford's bat	Hesperoptenus blanfordi Dobson, 1877	Caves & forests	LC^{IUCN} Unknown	
	Tickell's bat	Hesperoptenus tickelli Blyth, 1851	Caves & forests	LC^{IUCN} Unknown	
	Long-toothed pipistrelle	Hypsugo dolichodon Görföl et al., 2014	Caves & forests	DD^{IUCN} Unknown	
	Flat-skulled woolly bat	Kerivoula depressa	Evergreen forest	LC^{IUCN} Unknown	
	Indochinese woolly bat	Kerivoula dongduongana	Caves & forest	LC^{IUCN} Unknown	
	Hardwicke's woolly bat	Kerivoula hardwickii Horsfield, 1824	Caves & forest	LC^{IUCN}	
	Papillose woolly bat	Kerivoula papillosa Temminck, 1840	Forest	LC^{IUCN}	
	Least woolly bat	Kerivoula minuta Miller, 1898	Forest	NT^{IUCN} ▼	
	Painted bat	Kerivoula picta Pallas, 1767	Wide variety of habitats	NT^{IUCN} ▼	
	Hairy-faced bat	Myotis annectans Dobson, 1871	Evergreen forest	LC^{IUCN} Unknown	
	Round-eared tube-nosed bat	Murina cyclotis Dobson, 1871	Caves & forests	LC^{IUCN} Unknown	
	Fea's tube-nosed bat	Murina feae	Forest	LC^{IUCN} Unknown	
	Fiona's tube-nosed bat	Murina fionae	Forest	LC^{IUCN} Unknown	
	Harrison's tube-nosed bat	Murina harrisoni Csorba & Bates 2005	Forest	LC^{IUCN} Unknown	
	Walston's tube-nosed bat	Murina walstoni Furey, Csorba & Son, 2011	Forest	DD^{IUCN} Unknown	
	Peters's myotis	Myotis ater Peters, 1866	Forest	LC^{IUCN} Unknown	
	Lesser large-footed bat	Myotis hasseltii Temminck, 1840	Caves & forests	LC^{IUCN} Unknown	
	Horsfield's bat	Myotis horsfieldii Temminck, 1840	Caves & forest	LC^{IUCN}	
	Wall-roosting mouse-eared bat	Myotis muricola Gray, 1846	Caves & forests	LC^{IUCN}	
	Thick-thumbed myotis	Myotis rosseti Oey, 1951	Forest	LC^{IUCN} Unknown	
	Himalayan whiskered bat	Myotis siligorensis Horsfield, 1855	Caves & forests	LC^{IUCN} Unknown	
	Peters's trumpet-eared bat	Phoniscus jagorii Peters, 1866	Forest & wetlands	LC^{IUCN} Unknown	
	Indian pipistrelle	Pipistrellus coromandra Gray, 1838	Caves & forests	LC^{IUCN} Unknown	
	Java pipistrelle	Pipistrellus javanicus Gray, 1838	Caves & forest	LC^{IUCN}	
	Least pipistrelle	Pipistrellus tenuis Temminck C. J., 1840	Forest, shrubland, & grassland	LC^{IUCN}	
	Greater Asiatic yellow bat	Scotophilus heathii Horsfield, 1831	Forest & shrublands	LC^{IUCN}	
	Lesser Asiatic yellow bat	Scotophilus kuhlii Leach, 1821	Forest & shrublands	LC^{IUCN}	
	Greater bamboo bat	Tylonycteris robustula Thomas, 1915	Caves & forests	LC^{IUCN} Unknown	
Family Molossidae: free-tailed bats
	Wrinkle-lipped free-tailed bat	Chaerephon plicatus Buchanan, 1800	Caves, rocky areas, savanna & forests	LC^{IUCN} Unknown	
	Wroughton's free-tailed bat	Otomops wroughtoni Thomas, 1913	Caves & forest; only known from one location in Cambodia	DD^{IUCN} Unknown	
Family Miniopteridae
	Small bent-winged bat	Miniopterus pusillus Dobson, 1876	Caves & forest	LC^{IUCN} Unknown	
Family Emballonuridae
	Naked-rumped pouched bat	Saccolaimus saccolaimus Temminck, 1838	Caves, forest, & savanna	LC^{IUCN}	
	Long-winged tomb bat	Taphozous longimanus Hardwicke, 1825	Caves, rocky areas, savanna & forests	LC^{IUCN}	
	Black-bearded tomb bat	Taphozous melanopogon Temminck, 1841	Caves, rocky areas, shrubland & forests	LC^{IUCN}	
	Theobald's tomb bat	Taphozous theobaldi Dobson, 1872	Caves & forest	LC^{IUCN} Unknown	
Family Megadermatidae: false vampire bats
	Greater false vampire bat	Lyroderma lyra E. Geoffroy, 1810	Caves, rocky areas & forests	LC^{IUCN} Unknown	
	Lesser false vampire bat	Megaderma spasma Linnaeus, 1758	Caves, rocky areas & forests	LC^{IUCN} Unknown	
Family Rhinolophidae: horseshoe bats
	Intermediate horseshoe bat	Rhinolophus affinis Horsfield, 1823	Caves & forests	LC^{IUCN}	
	Acuminate horseshoe bat	Rhinolophus acuminatus Peters, 1871	Caves & forests	LC^{IUCN} Unknown	
	Bornean horseshoe bat	Rhinolophus borneensis Peters, 1861	Caves, rocky areas, & forests	LC^{IUCN} Unknown	
	Great woolly horseshoe bat	Rhinolophus luctus Temminck, 1835	Caves, rocky areas, & forests	LC^{IUCN} Unknown	
	Malayan horseshoe bat	Rhinolophus malayanus Bonhote, 1903	Caves & forests	LC^{IUCN}	
	Indo-Chinese Lesser Brown Horseshoe Bat	Rhinolophus microglobosus Csorba and Jenkins, 1998	Caves & forests	LC^{IUCN}	
	Least horseshoe bat	Rhinolophus pearsonii Temminck, 1834	Caves & forests	LC^{IUCN}	
	Least horseshoe bat	Rhinolophus pusillus Temminck, 1834	Caves & forests	LC^{IUCN}	
	Shamel's horseshoe bat	Rhinolophus shameli Tate, 1943	Caves & forests	LC^{IUCN}	
Family Hipposideridae: Old World leaf-nosed bats
	East Asian tailless leaf-nosed bat	Coelops frithii Blyth, 1848	Caves & forest	NT^{IUCN} ▼	
	Great roundleaf bat	Hipposideros armiger Hodgson, 1835	Caves & forest	LC^{IUCN} Unknown	
	Ashy roundleaf bat	Hipposideros cineraceus Blyth, 1853	Caves & forest	LC^{IUCN} Unknown	
	Diadem leaf-nosed bat	Hipposideros diadema É. Geoffroy, 1813	Caves, savanna, & forests	LC^{IUCN} ▼	
	Cantor's roundleaf bat	Hipposideros galeritus Cantor, 1846	Caves & forests	LC^{IUCN} Unknown	
	Intermediate roundleaf bat	Hipposideros larvatus Horsfield, 1823	Caves & forests	LC^{IUCN} Unknown	

== Order: Dermoptera (colugos) ==
Image	Common name	Scientific name Authority	Preferred habitat	IUCN status	Range
Family Cynocephalidae: flying lemurs
	Sunda flying lemur	Galeopterus variegatus Audebert, 1799	Forest	LC^{IUCN} ▼	

== Order: Eulipotyphla (hedgehogs, shrews, moles and relatives) ==
Image	Common name	Scientific name Authority	Preferred habitat	IUCN status	Range
Family Erinaceidae: hedgehogs
	Northern short-tailed gymnure	Hylomys peguensis Blyth, 1859	Forest & shrubland		
Family Soricidae: shrews
	Asian gray shrew	Crocidura attenuata Milne-Edwards, 1872	Forest, shrubland, & grassland	LC^{IUCN} Unknown	
	Southeast Asian shrew	Crocidura fuliginosa (Blyth, 1856	Forest, shrublands, grasslands & rocky areas	LC^{IUCN}	
	Indochinese shrew	Crocidura indochinensis (Robinson and Kloss, 1922	Forest	LC^{IUCN} Unknown	
	Dr. Phan Luong shrew	Crocidura phanluongi (Jenkins, Abramov, Rozhnov, & Olsson, 2010	Forest	LC^{IUCN} Unknown	
	Asian house shrew	Suncus murinus Linnaeus, 1766	Widespread	LC^{IUCN}	

== Order: Lagomorpha (lagomorphs) ==
Image	Common name	Scientific name Authority	Preferred habitat	IUCN status	Range
Family Leporidae: rabbits, hares
	Burmese hare	Lepus peguensis Blyth, 1855	Grasslands, shrublands, savanna, & forest	LC^{IUCN}	

== Order: Pholidota (pangolins) ==
Image	Common name	Scientific name Authority	Preferred habitat	IUCN status	Range
Family Manidae
	Sunda pangolin	Manis javanica Desmarest, 1822	Forest & shrubland	CR^{IUCN} ▼	

== Order: Primates ==
Image	Common name	Scientific name Authority	Preferred habitat	IUCN status	Range
Family Lorisidae: lorises, bushbabies
	Bengal slow loris	Nycticebus bengalensis Lacépède, 1800	Forest	EN^{IUCN} ▼	
	Sunda slow loris	Nycticebus coucang Boddaert, 1785	Forest	EN^{IUCN} ▼	
	Pygmy slow loris	Xanthonycticebus pygmaeus Bonhote, 1907	Forest	EN^{IUCN} ▼	
Family Cercopithecidae: Old World monkeys
	Stump-tailed macaque	Macaca arctoides I. Geoffroy, 1831	Forest	VU^{IUCN} ▼	
	Crab-eating macaque	Macaca fascicularis Raffles, 1821	Forest, wetlands, & intertidal marine zone	EN^{IUCN} ▼	
	Northern pig-tailed macaque	Macaca leonina Blyth, 1863	Forest	VU^{IUCN} ▼	
	Germain's langur	Trachypithecus germaini Milne-Edwards, 1876	Forest & rocky areas	EN^{IUCN} ▼	
	Annamese langur	Trachypithecus margarita Elliot, 1909	Forest	EN^{IUCN} ▼	
	Red-shanked douc	Pygathrix nemaeus Linnaeus, 1771	Forest	CR^{IUCN} ▼	
	Black-shanked douc	Pygathrix nigripes Milne-Edwards, 1871	Forest	CR^{IUCN} ▼	
Family Hylobatidae: gibbons
	Pileated gibbon	Hylobates pileatus Gray, 1861	Forest	EN^{IUCN} ▼	
	Northern buffed-cheeked gibbon	Nomascus annamensis Thinh et al., 2010	Forest	EN^{IUCN} ▼	
	Yellow-cheeked gibbon	Nomascus gabriellae Thomas, 1909	Forest	EN^{IUCN} ▼	
Family Hominidae: great apes
	Human	Homo sapiens Linnaeus, 1758	Widespread	LC ▲	

== Order: Proboscidea (elephants) ==
Image	Common name	Scientific name Authority	Preferred habitat	IUCN status	Range
Family Elephantidae: elephants
	Asian elephant	Elephas maximus Linnaeus, 1758	Forest, shrubland, grassland	EN^{IUCN} ▼	

== Order: Rodentia (rodents) ==
Image	Common name	Scientific name Authority	Preferred habitat	IUCN status	Range
Family Hystricidae: Old World porcupines
	Asiatic brush-tailed porcupine	Atherurus macrourus Linnaeus, 1758	Montane forest	LC^{IUCN} ▼	
	Malayan porcupine	Hystrix brachyura Linnaeus, 1758	Forest, shrubland, & grassland	LC^{IUCN} ▼	
Family Sciuridae: squirrels
	Pallas's squirrel	Callosciurus erythraeus Pallas, 1779	Montane forest & scrubland	LC^{IUCN}	
	Finlayson's squirrel	Callosciurus finlaysonii Horsfield, 1823	Forest, shrubland, & inland wetlands	LC^{IUCN}	
	Asian red-cheeked squirrel	Dremomys rufigenis Blanford, 1878	Forest & shrubland	LC^{IUCN}	
	Particolored flying squirrel	Hylopetes alboniger Hodgson, 1836	Forest & shrubland	LC^{IUCN} ▼	
	Berdmore's ground squirrel	Menetes berdmorei Blyth, 1849	Forest, shrubland, & grassland	LC^{IUCN}	
	Red giant flying squirrel	Petaurista petaurista Pallas, 1766	Forest	LC^{IUCN} ▼	
	Indian giant flying squirrel	Petaurista philippensis Elliot, 1839	Forest	LC^{IUCN} ▼	
	Black giant squirrel	Ratufa bicolor Sparrman, 1778	Forest	NT^{IUCN} ▼	
	Himalayan striped squirrel	Tamiops mcclellandii Horsfield, 1840	Forest, shrubland, grassland, & inland wetlands	LC^{IUCN}	
	Cambodian striped squirrel	Tamiops rodolphii Milne-Edwards, 1867	Forest & shrubland	LC^{IUCN}	
Family Spalacidae
	Lesser bamboo rat	Cannomys badius Hodgson, 1841	Forest	LC^{IUCN} Unknown	
	Hoary bamboo rat	Rhizomys pruinosus Blyth, 1851	Forest & grassland	LC^{IUCN}	
	Large bamboo rat	Rhizomys sumatrensis Raffles, 1821	Forest	LC^{IUCN} Unknown	
Family Muridae: mice, rats, gerbils
	Greater bandicoot rat	Bandicota indica Bechstein, 1800	Primarily cropland & cities	LC^{IUCN} ▲	
	Savile's bandicoot rat	Bandicota savilei Thomas, 1916	Primarily cropland	LC^{IUCN}	
	Small white-toothed rat	Berylmys berdmorei Blyth, 1851	Forest	LC^{IUCN}	
	Indomalayan pencil-tailed tree mouse	Chiropodomys gliroides Blyth, 1856	Forest	LC^{IUCN}	
	Long-tailed giant rat	Leopoldamys sabanus Thomas, 1887	Forest	LC^{IUCN}	
	Red spiny rat	Maxomys surifer Miller, 1900	Forest	LC^{IUCN} ▼	
	Ryukyu mouse	Mus caroli Bonhote, 1902	Shrubland & grassland	LC^{IUCN}	
	Fawn-colored mouse	Mus cervicolor Hodgson, 1845	Forest, shrubland, & grassland	LC^{IUCN}	
	House mouse	Mus musculus Linnaeus, 1758	Introduced; commensal with humans	LC^{IUCN}	
	Gairdner's shrewmouse	Mus pahari Thomas, 1916	Forest	LC^{IUCN}	
	Shortridge's mouse	Mus shortridgei Thomas, 1914	Grassland & shrubland	LC^{IUCN}	
	Chestnut white-bellied rat	Niviventer fulvescens Gray, 1847	Forest	LC^{IUCN} ▼	
	Lang Bian white-bellied rat	Niviventer langbianis Robinson & Kloss, 1922	Evergreen forest	LC^{IUCN} ▼	
	Tenasserim white-bellied rat	Niviventer tenaster Thomas, 1916	Montane forest	LC^{IUCN} Unknown	
	Sikkim rat	Rattus andamanensis Blyth, 1860	Forest	LC^{IUCN}	
	Ricefield rat	Rattus argentiventer Robinson & Kloss, 1916	Grassland	LC^{IUCN}	
	Polynesian rat	Rattus exulans Peale, 1848	Widespread	LC^{IUCN}	
	Lesser ricefield rat	Rattus losea R. Swinhoe, 1871	Grassland & cropland	LC^{IUCN} ▲	
	Brown rat	Rattus norvegicus Berkenhout, 1769	Introduced; Widespread in the presence of humans	LC^{IUCN}	
	Black rat	Rattus rattus Linnaeus, 1758	Introduced; commensal with humans	LC^{IUCN}	
	Tanezumi rat	Rattus tanezumi Temminck, 1844	Forest, shrublands, & grasslands	LC^{IUCN} ▲	
	Asiatic long-tailed climbing mouse	Vandeleuria oleracea Bennett, 1832	Forest, shrublands, & grasslands	LC^{IUCN}	

== Order: Scandentia (treeshrews) ==
Image	Common name	Scientific name Authority	Preferred habitat	IUCN status	Range
Family Tupaiidae: treeshrews
	Northern smooth-tailed treeshrew	Dendrogale murina Schlegel & S. Müller, 1843	Forest	LC^{IUCN} ▼	
	Northern treeshrew	Tupaia belangeri Wagner, 1841	Forest & shrubland	LC^{IUCN}	

== Order: Sirenia (manatees and dugongs) ==
Image	Common name	Scientific name Authority	Preferred habitat	IUCN status	Range
Family Dugongidae
	Dugong	Dugong dugon Müller, 1776	Neritic & intertidal marine zones	VU^{IUCN} ▼	

== See also ==
- Wildlife of Cambodia
- List of birds of Cambodia
