= Bismarck trumpet-eared bat =

Conservation status
- Vulnerable (IUCN 3.1)

Scientific classification
- Kingdom: Animalia
- Phylum: Chordata
- Class: Mammalia
- Order: Chiroptera
- Family: Vespertilionidae
- Genus: Kerivoula
- Species: K. myrella

Binomial name
- Kerivoula myrella Thomas, 1914

Species of bat

The Bismarck trumpet-eared bat (Kerivoula myrella), also known as the Manus Island woolly bat, is a species of vesper bat in the family Vespertilionidae. It is found in subtropical or tropical dry forests.

== Taxonomy ==
The Bismarck trumpet-eared bat was described as a new species in 1914 by British mammalogist Oldfield Thomas. The holotype had been collected on Manus Island, which is part of the Bismarck Archipelago.

== Description ==
Overall, the Bismarck trumpet-eared bat is similar in appearance to Hardwicke's woolly bat. It has a forearm length of 35.5–38.4 mm (1.40–1.51 in).

== Biology and ecology ==
It is an echolocating species with frequency modulation of its calls. The calls are broadband, with very slight curvature of the downward sweep of call frequencies. Its echolocation calls have low energy, meaning that it is unlikely to be detected by acoustic detectors unless it passes close to the device's microphone.

== Range and habitat ==
It is found in Papua New Guinea, though its range may also include Indonesia. It has been documented at a range of 0–500 m (0–1,640 ft) above sea level.

== Conservation ==
As of 2008, it is evaluated as a Vulnerable species by the IUCN. It meets the criteria for this designation regarding its population size, ecological requirements, and threats it may be facing.
