= Cryptic woolly bat =

Conservation status
- Least Concern (IUCN 3.1)

Scientific classification
- Kingdom: Animalia
- Phylum: Chordata
- Class: Mammalia
- Order: Chiroptera
- Family: Vespertilionidae
- Genus: Kerivoula
- Species: K. crypta

Binomial name
- Kerivoula crypta Wroughton and Ryley, 1913

Species of bat

The cryptic woolly bat, also known as the flat-headed woolly bat (Kerivoula crypta), is a species of vesper bat found in southern India and Sri Lanka.

== Taxonomy ==
It was described as a new species in 1913 by Robert Charles Wroughton and Kathleen V. Ryley. The holotype had been collected in 1912 by Guy C. Shortridge in Shimoga, India.

Kerivoula crypta was traditionally considered synonymous with Kerivoula hardwickii (Hardwicke's woolly bat) until a 2018 genetic study revealed that K. hardwickii actually represented a species complex of bat species that appeared similar but differed genetically.

== Description ==
The cryptic woolly bat is similar in appearance to Hardwicke's woolly bat. Unlike Hardwicke's woolly bat, individual hairs on its body are uniform in color (vs. bicolored). The fur on its belly is slightly lighter than that on its back. Its flight membranes lack fur, with the wing membrane attaching to the hind limb at the base of the first toe. The tragus is long and gradually tapering to a sharp point.

The head and body length is approximately 41–45 mm (1.6–1.8 in) and the forearm length is about 33–34.7 mm (1.30–1.37 in).

== Range and habitat ==
The cryptic woolly bat is native to southern India and Sria Lanka. It is found at a range of elevations, encompassing both lowland and montane habitats.
