= Kachin woolly bat =

Conservation status
- Least Concern (IUCN 3.1)

Scientific classification
- Kingdom: Animalia
- Phylum: Chordata
- Class: Mammalia
- Order: Chiroptera
- Family: Vespertilionidae
- Genus: Kerivoula
- Species: K. kachinensis

Binomial name
- Kerivoula kachinensis Bates, Struebig, Rossiter, Kingston, Sia Sein Lein Oo & Khin Mya Mya, 2004
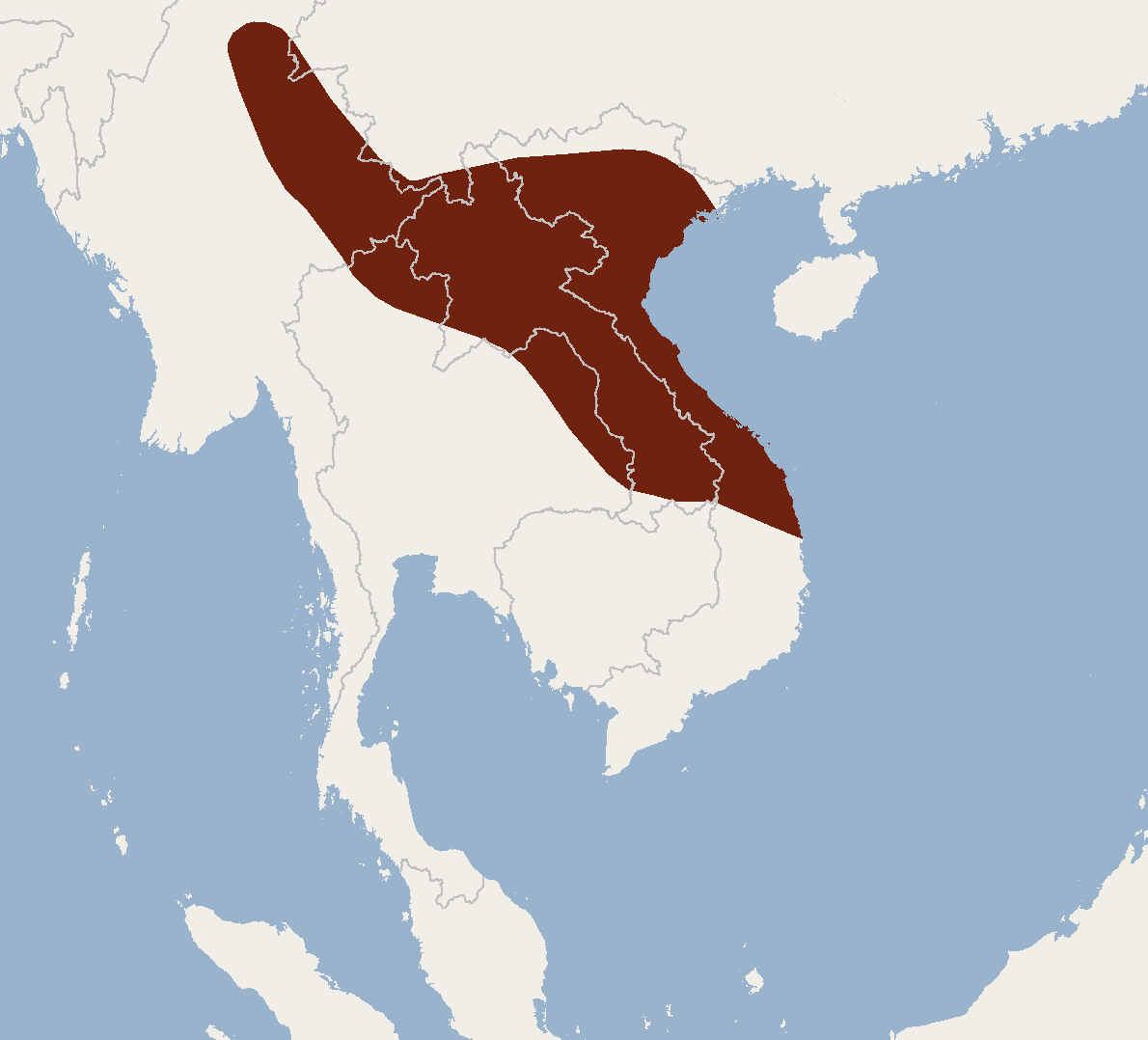

Species of bat

The Kachin woolly bat (Kerivoula kachinensis) is a species of bat found in Southeast Asia.

== Taxonomy and etymology ==
It was initially described as a new species in 2004. Its species name "kachinensis" is derived from Kachin State—the state in Myanmar where it was first documented.

== Description ==
It is a relatively large member of its genus, with a forearm length of 41.3 mm (1.63 in). Individuals weigh approximately 7 g (0.25 oz). Its fur is grayish-brown. Its ears are large and hairless. The tragus is long and narrow, at 9.5 mm (0.37 in). Its tail is 54 mm (2.1 in) long. Its skull has a flattened appearance. Its dental formula is 2.1.3.33.1.3.3 for a total of 38 teeth.

== Biology and ecology ==
It is nocturnal, roosting during the day and foraging at night. The state of its flattened skull led some researchers to hypothesize that during the day it roosts in small, constricted spaces.

== Range and habitat ==
It was first documented in Myanmar in 2004, but its range was quickly expanded to Laos, Cambodia, Vietnam, and Thailand after documentation in 2006.

== Conservation ==
It is currently assessed as least concern by the IUCN—its lowest conservation priority. It meets the criteria for this assessment because it has a large range, no major threats to this species have been identified, and it is not likely to be declining quickly.
