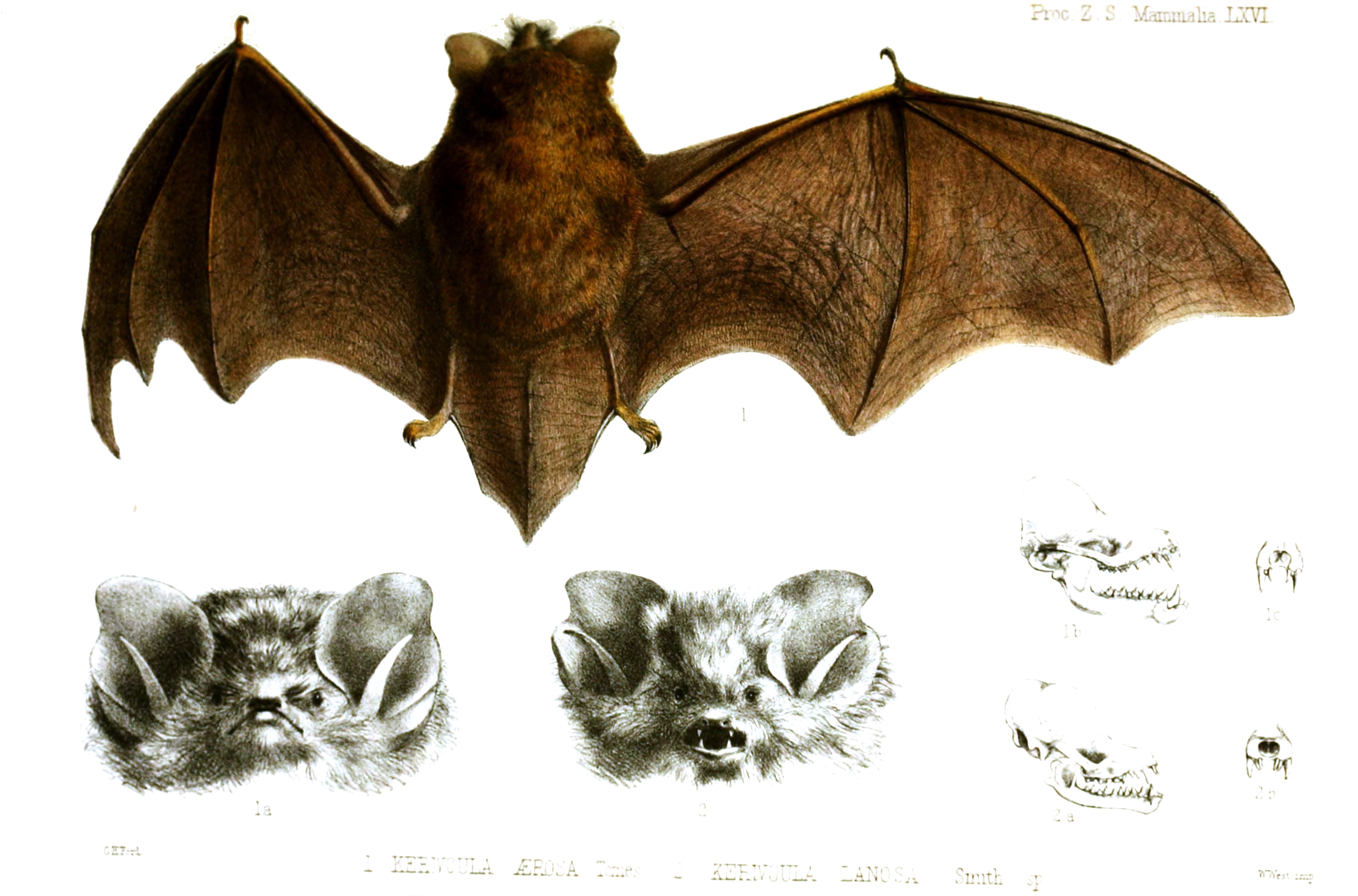

Scientific classification
- Kingdom: Animalia
- Phylum: Chordata
- Class: Mammalia
- Order: Chiroptera
- Family: Vespertilionidae
- Subfamily: Kerivoulinae
- Genus: Kerivoula; Gray, 1842

Type species
- Vespertilio pictus Pallas, 1767

Species
- See Text

= Kerivoula =

Genus of bats

Kerivoula is a genus of vesper bats in the subfamily Kerivoulinae. They are found throughout tropical and subtropical regions of Africa, Asia, and New Guinea.

Species within this genus are:

- Tanzanian woolly bat (Kerivoula africana)
- St. Aignan's trumpet-eared bat (Kerivoula agnella)
- Damara woolly bat (Kerivoula argentata)
- Cryptic woolly bat (Kerivoula crypta)
- Copper woolly bat (Kerivoula cuprosa)
- Flat-skulled woolly bat (Kerivoula depressa)
- Indochina's flat-headed woolly bat (Kerivoula dongduongana)
- Ethiopian woolly bat (Kerivoula eriophora)
- Flores woolly bat (Kerivoula flora)
- Dark woolly bat (Kerivoula furva)
- Hardwicke's woolly bat (Kerivoula hardwickii)
- Small woolly bat (Kerivoula intermedia)
- Kachin woolly bat (Kerivoula kachinensis)
- Krau woolly bat (Kerivoula krauensis)
- Lesser woolly bat (Kerivoula lanosa)
- Lenis woolly bat (Kerivoula lenis)
- Sri Lankan woolly bat (Kerivoula malpasi)
- Least woolly bat (Kerivoula minuta)
- Fly River trumpet-eared bat (Kerivoula muscina)
- Bismarck's trumpet-eared bat (Kerivoula myrella)
- Papillose woolly bat (Kerivoula papillosa)
- Clear-winged woolly bat (Kerivoula pellucida)
- Spurrell's woolly bat (Kerivoula phalaena)
- Painted bat (Kerivoula picta)
- Bornean woolly bat (K. pusilla)
- Smith's woolly bat (Kerivoula smithii)
- Titania's woolly bat (Kerivoula titania)
- Whitehead's woolly bat (Kerivoula whiteheadi)
