= Lenis woolly bat =

Conservation status
- Least Concern (IUCN 3.1)

Scientific classification
- Kingdom: Animalia
- Phylum: Chordata
- Class: Mammalia
- Order: Chiroptera
- Family: Vespertilionidae
- Genus: Kerivoula
- Species: K. lenis

Binomial name
- Kerivoula lenis Thomas, 1916

Species of mammal

The lenis woolly bat (Kerivoula lenis) is a species of bat in the family Vespertilionidae. It is found in South and Southeast Asia.

== Taxonomy and etymology ==
It was described as a new species in 1916 by British zoologist Oldfield Thomas. It was previously considered to be a specimen of K. papillosa. Its species name "lenis" is Latin for "soft."

== Description ==
The bats have russet brown dorsal pelage and gray brown ventral pelage.

The species has a forearm length of 37.2-40.2 mm.

== Range and habitat ==
It is found in Tamil Nadu in India, and the Malaysian and Indonesian portions of Borneo.

It has been observed in forest understories.

== Conservation ==
The bat has been assessed by the IUCN as least-concern due to its large range, presumed large population, and lack of significant population decline.

It is known to occur in some protected areas in Borneo.
