= Fly River trumpet-eared bat =

Conservation status
- Least Concern (IUCN 3.1)

Scientific classification
- Kingdom: Animalia
- Phylum: Chordata
- Class: Mammalia
- Order: Chiroptera
- Family: Vespertilionidae
- Genus: Kerivoula
- Species: K. muscina

Binomial name
- Kerivoula muscina Tate, 1941

Species of bat

The Fly River trumpet-eared bat (Kerivoula muscina) is a species of vesper bat. It is found only in Papua New Guinea. Its natural habitat is subtropical or tropical dry forests.
