= Indochina's flat-headed woolly bat =

Conservation status
- Least Concern (IUCN 3.1)

Scientific classification
- Kingdom: Animalia
- Phylum: Chordata
- Class: Mammalia
- Order: Chiroptera
- Family: Vespertilionidae
- Genus: Kerivoula
- Species: K. dongduongana

Binomial name
- Kerivoula dongduongana Tu, Hassanin, Furey, Son & Csorba, 2018

Species of bat

Indochina's flat-headed woolly bat (Kerivoula dongduongana) is a species of vesper bat found in Southeast Asia, including Laos, Thailand, Vietnam, and Cambodia.

== Taxonomy ==
Indochina's flat-headed woolly bat was described as a new species in 2018. A genetic study revealed that the Asian population of Hardwicke's woolly bat, Kerivoula hardwickii, was actually a species complex of taxa that appeared similar but differed genetically. The authors recommended splitting K. hardwickii, with one resulting taxon named Kerivoula dongduongana. The holotype had been collected in Ngọc Linh in Vietnam in 2011. The species name dongduongana is derived from Vietnamese Ðông Dương, which formerly referred to Indochina.

== Description ==
Indochina's flat-headed woolly bat is considered a medium-sized member of the genus Kerivoula, with a forearm length of about 32 mm (1.3 in). The holotype, an adult female, had a mass of 4.5 g (0.16 oz).

== Range ==
Its range encompasses the Annamite Range of Southeast Asia, including southern Vietnam, Laos, Cambodia, and northwestern Thailand. A 2023 publication noted its first documented occurrence in China.
