= Flores woolly bat =

Conservation status
- Vulnerable (IUCN 3.1)

Scientific classification
- Kingdom: Animalia
- Phylum: Chordata
- Class: Mammalia
- Order: Chiroptera
- Family: Vespertilionidae
- Genus: Kerivoula
- Species: K. flora

Binomial name
- Kerivoula flora Thomas, 1914

Species of bat

The Flores woolly bat (Kerivoula flora) is a species of vesper bat in the family Vespertilionidae.

== Distribution ==
It is found in Indonesia and Malaysia. The distribution of this species is believed to be in Borneo, Bali, the Lesser Sunda Islands, and Sumba. Possibly the same or a very similar species can be found in Kon Kha Kinh and Pu Mat, Vietnam.

The species, primarily dependent on forests, has undergone a 30% population decline over the last ten years, in the lesser Sundras.
