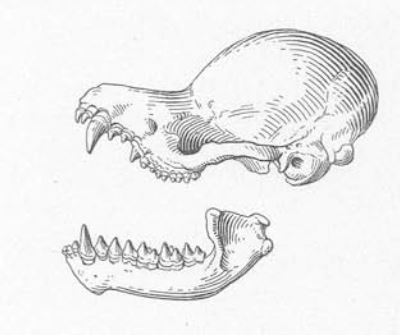

Conservation status
- Data Deficient (IUCN 3.1)

Scientific classification
- Kingdom: Animalia
- Phylum: Chordata
- Class: Mammalia
- Order: Chiroptera
- Family: Vespertilionidae
- Genus: Kerivoula
- Species: K. cuprosa

Binomial name
- Kerivoula cuprosa Thomas, 1912

= Copper woolly bat =

Species of bat

The copper woolly bat (Kerivoula cuprosa) is a species of vesper bat. It is found in Cameroon, Democratic Republic of the Congo, Ivory Coast, and Guinea. Its natural habitats are subtropical or tropical dry forests, subtropical or tropical moist lowland forests, and subtropical or tropical swamps. It is threatened by habitat loss.

== Taxonomy ==
The copper woolly bat was described as a new species in 1912 by British zoologist Oldfield Thomas. The holotype had been collected in 1911 by George Latimer Bates in southeast Cameroon.

== Description ==
The copper woolly bat is a small microbat, with a forearm length of 30–33 mm (1.2–1.3 in) and weight of 4.0–4.5 g (0.14–0.16 oz). The hair on its back is chocolate brown in color, with the tips of its hairs "frosted" in appearance with a golden color. The texture of its fur is woolly and frizzled. The uropatagium (flight membrane between the hind limbs) lacks a fringe of hair, which can distinguish it from some other African Kerivoula.

== Biology and ecology ==
The copper woolly bat is insectivorous, foraging for its insect prey in cluttered rainforests. It likely hunts by gleaning, or plucking insects off of vegetation. Its broad wings are capable of maneuverable flight and hovering for short durations. It likely favors smaller arthropods and those that are soft-bodied, as its teeth and skull are incapable of generating a high bite force.

== Range and habitat ==
The copper woolly bat has been documented in the following countries: Cameroon, Democratic Republic of the Congo, Ivory Coast, Guinea, Kenya, and Liberia. Its habitat includes swampy forests, lowland forests, and forests interspersed with savanna.
