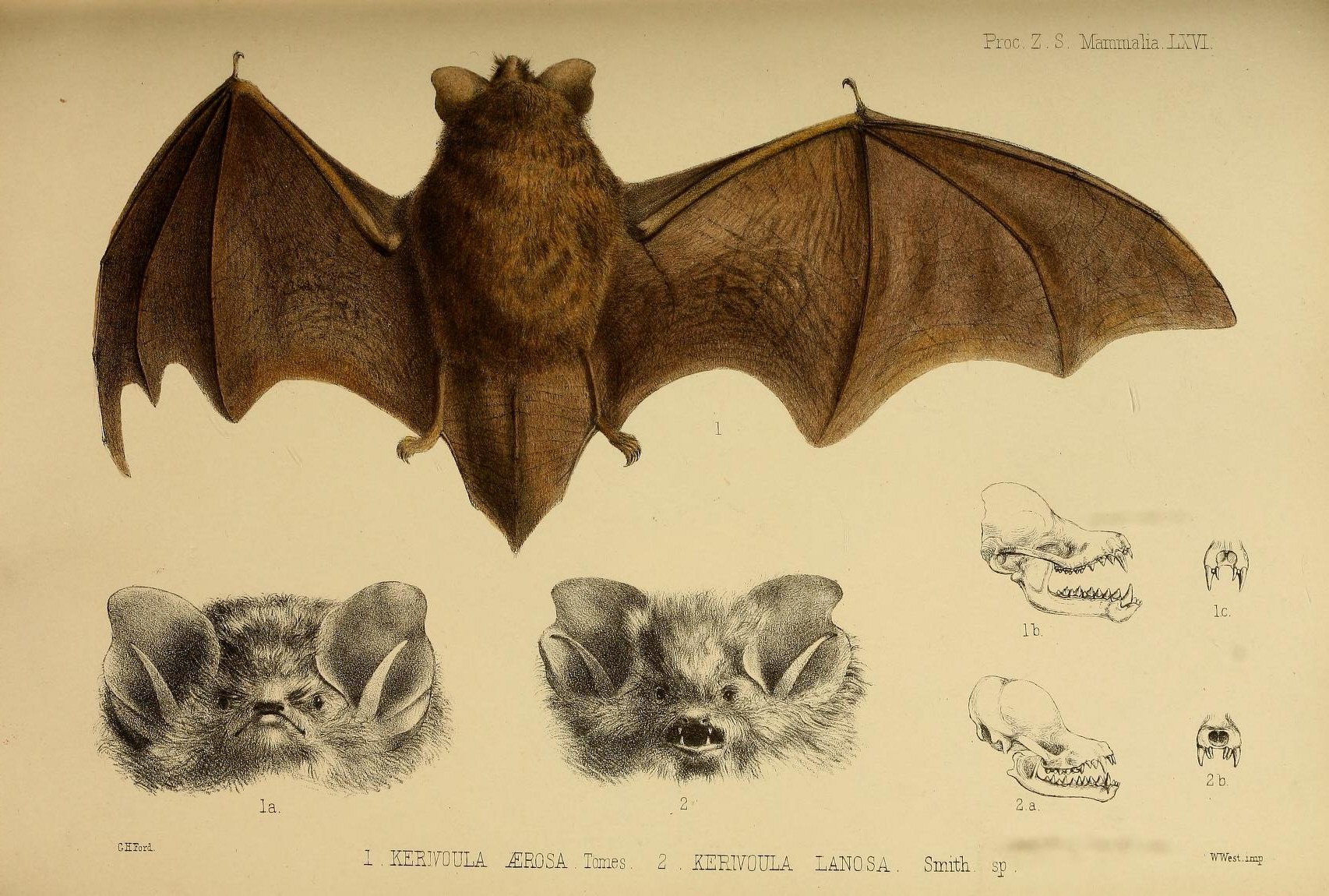

Conservation status
- Least Concern (IUCN 3.1)

Scientific classification
- Kingdom: Animalia
- Phylum: Chordata
- Class: Mammalia
- Order: Chiroptera
- Family: Vespertilionidae
- Genus: Kerivoula
- Species: K. lanosa

Binomial name
- Kerivoula lanosa (A. Smith, 1847)

= Lesser woolly bat =

Species of bat

The lesser woolly bat (Kerivoula lanosa) is a species of vesper bat in the family Vespertilionidae. It is found in Botswana, Central African Republic, Democratic Republic of the Congo, Ivory Coast, Ethiopia, Gabon, Ghana, Guinea, Kenya, Liberia, Malawi, Nigeria, South Africa, Tanzania, Zambia, Zimbabwe and rarely Ethiopia. Its natural habitats are subtropical or tropical moist lowland forests, dry savanna, and moist savanna. Members of this species typically have a dark greyish brown fur with whitish tips scattered throughout.

== Ecology ==
The habitats that this bat lives are typically near water. Aquatic environments are generally inhabited, and when found in dryer climates such as forests or the savannah, they are generally near streams or in well watered areas. Roosting sites are often important in the ecology of bats, as the bats are subject to the conditions of their roosting sites. The nests constructed by birds, such as speckle-fronted weaver, provide protection from predators and the elements. likely as a result of the benefits gained from roosting in these nests, the lesser woolly bats have been known to roost in abandoned nests previously inhabited by speckled weavers, scarlet-chested sunbirds, and several others. The average number of bats per nest is usually between 1 and 3. However, the property and survival advantages remain unstudied.
