= Ethiopian woolly bat =

Conservation status
- Data Deficient (IUCN 3.1)

Scientific classification
- Kingdom: Animalia
- Phylum: Chordata
- Class: Mammalia
- Order: Chiroptera
- Family: Vespertilionidae
- Genus: Kerivoula
- Species: K. eriophora

Binomial name
- Kerivoula eriophora (Heuglin, 1877)

Species of bat

The Ethiopian woolly bat (Kerivoula eriophora) is a species of vesper bat in the family Vespertilionidae. It is found only in Ethiopia.
