= Smith's woolly bat =

Conservation status
- Least Concern (IUCN 3.1)

Scientific classification
- Kingdom: Animalia
- Phylum: Chordata
- Class: Mammalia
- Order: Chiroptera
- Family: Vespertilionidae
- Genus: Kerivoula
- Species: K. smithii

Binomial name
- Kerivoula smithii Thomas, 1880

Species of bat

Smith's woolly bat (Kerivoula smithii) is a species of vesper bat in the family Vespertilionidae. It is found in Cameroon, Democratic Republic of the Congo, Kenya, Nigeria, and Uganda. Its natural habitats are subtropical or tropical dry forests, subtropical or tropical moist lowland forests, subtropical or tropical swamps, and subtropical or tropical moist montane forests.
