= Krau woolly bat =

Conservation status
- Near Threatened (IUCN 3.1)

Scientific classification
- Kingdom: Animalia
- Phylum: Chordata
- Class: Mammalia
- Order: Chiroptera
- Family: Vespertilionidae
- Genus: Kerivoula
- Species: K. krauensis

Binomial name
- Kerivoula krauensis Francis, Kingston, Zubaid 2007
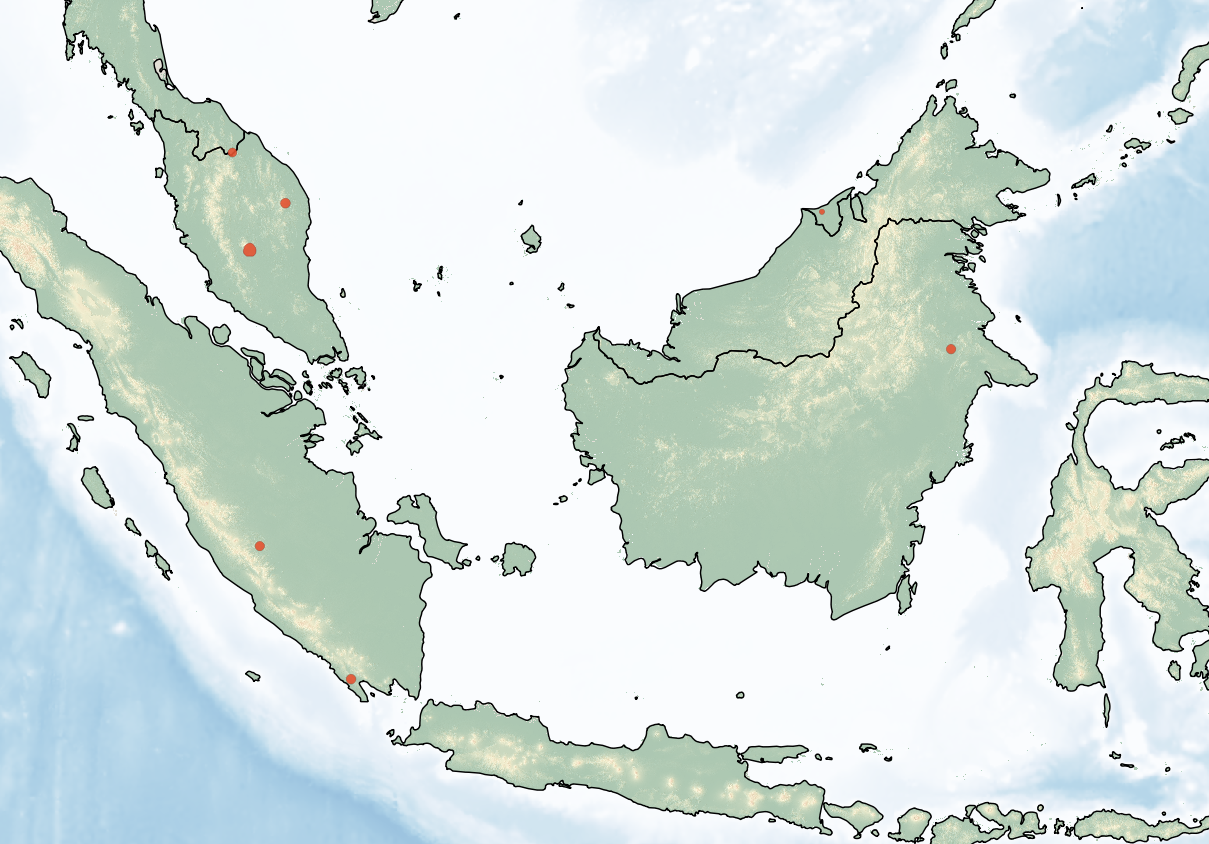

Species of bat

The Krau woolly bat (Kerivoula krauensis) is a species of bat in the family Vespertilionidae. It is found in Southeast Asia, Brunei, and Indonesia.

== Taxonomy ==
The species specific epithet is in honour of the region in which it was discovered, the Krau Wildlife Reserve.

== Habitat and distribution ==
The species is found in Thailand, Malaysia, Indonesia, and Brunei. It inhabits the understorey of mature lowland forests, although it has also been found in logged forests and in montane areas up to an elevation of 1,600 m.

== Conservation ==
The species is very vulnerable to deforestation due to its need for relatively undisturbed primary forest.
