= Damara woolly bat =

Conservation status
- Least Concern (IUCN 3.1)

Scientific classification
- Kingdom: Animalia
- Phylum: Chordata
- Class: Mammalia
- Order: Chiroptera
- Family: Vespertilionidae
- Genus: Kerivoula
- Species: K. argentata

Binomial name
- Kerivoula argentata Tomes, 1861

Species of bat

The Damara woolly bat (Kerivoula argentata) is a nocturnal insectivorous species of vesper bat in the family Vespertilionidae found in Africa. This species typically has reddish brown fur on its back and white fur on its abdomen. Its natural habitat is moist savanna, although it has also been shown to inhabit woodlands and coastal forests. These bats typically weight about 10 g, and have a low aspect ratio, as well as low wing loading.

== Appearance ==
These bats typically have a rich brown mixed with grizzled silver coat of hair on top and grey or whitish hair underneath. The ears are proportionally large compared to their size and have rounded tips. They typically weigh between 6 and 9 g and are between 8.3 and 10 cm long, with an average wingspan of 25 cm. A feature relatively unique to K. argentata is the fringe of hair on the outer edge of interfemoral membrane which stretches between its legs, as this hair is distinctive to this species.

== Echolocation ==
The echolocation for this species is a relatively low-intensity call that lasts about two milliseconds with a low frequency peak of around 90-118 kilohertz (kHz). These properties allow the bats to come as close as 3 m from its prey before the calls are detectable.

== Ecology ==
As with several other Kerivoula species, the Damara woolly bat uses abandoned nests of weaverbirds and the scarlet-chested sunbird. Typically, the bats roost alone, but colonies can reach up to six members. The range of the bats extends across much of sub-Saharan Africa and has been identified in Angola, Côte d'Ivoire, Democratic Republic of the Congo, Eswatini, Kenya, Malawi, Mozambique, Namibia, Senegal, South Africa, Tanzania, Uganda, Zambia, and Zimbabwe.
