= Kerivoula depressa =

Conservation status
- Least Concern (IUCN 3.1)

Scientific classification
- Kingdom: Animalia
- Phylum: Chordata
- Class: Mammalia
- Order: Chiroptera
- Family: Vespertilionidae
- Genus: Kerivoula
- Species: K. depressa

Binomial name
- Kerivoula depressa Gerrit Smith Miller Jr., 1906

Species of bat

Kerivoula depressa, commonly called Miller's flat-headed woolly bat or the flat-skulled woolly bat, is a species of vesper bat found in Southeast Asia.

== Taxonomy and etymology ==
Kerivoula depressa was initially described by American zoologist Gerrit Smith Miller Jr. The holotype had been collected near Taungoo, Myanmar by Leonardo Fea. It was long considered a subspecies of Hardwicke's woolly bat until a 2017 paper showed cryptic diversity within the species: based on genetic differentiation, the authors determined that K. depressa should be considered a species rather than a subspecies.

== Description ==
Kerivoula depressa is considered a medium-sized member of the genus Kerivoula. Its forearm length is about 30.8 mm (1.21 in). It has a flattened skull lacking any sagittal crest, with the greatest length of skull around 13.8 mm (0.54 in). The fur on its back is bicolored—individual hairs are black at the bases but dark brown at the tips. The fur on its belly is paler in color, also with bicolored hairs that are dark brown at the bases and brownish yellow at the tips.

== Range and habitat ==
Kerivoula depressa is found in Southeast Asia, where its range includes Cambodia, Laos, Myanmar, Thailand, and Vietnam. It is found at elevations from 150–1,453 m (492–4,767 ft) above sea level in evergreen forest habitats.

== Conservation ==
As of 2021, it is evaluated as a least-concern species by the IUCN. It has a large geographic range, presumably large population that is not experiencing rapid decline, its range includes protected areas, and it can persist in environments experiencing disturbance.
