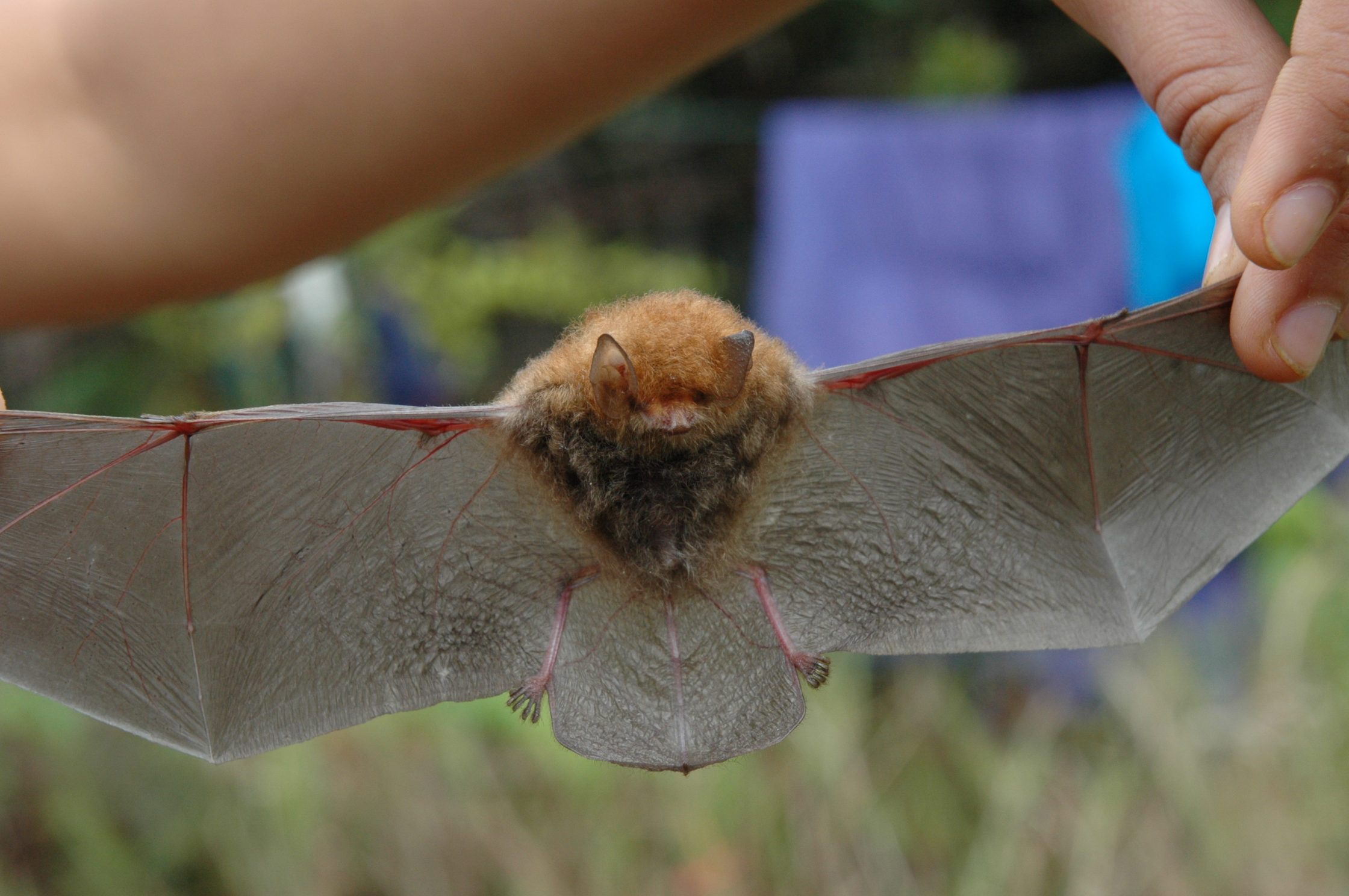

Conservation status
- Least Concern (IUCN 3.1)

Scientific classification
- Kingdom: Animalia
- Phylum: Chordata
- Class: Mammalia
- Order: Chiroptera
- Family: Vespertilionidae
- Genus: Kerivoula
- Species: K. whiteheadi

Binomial name
- Kerivoula whiteheadi Thomas, 1894
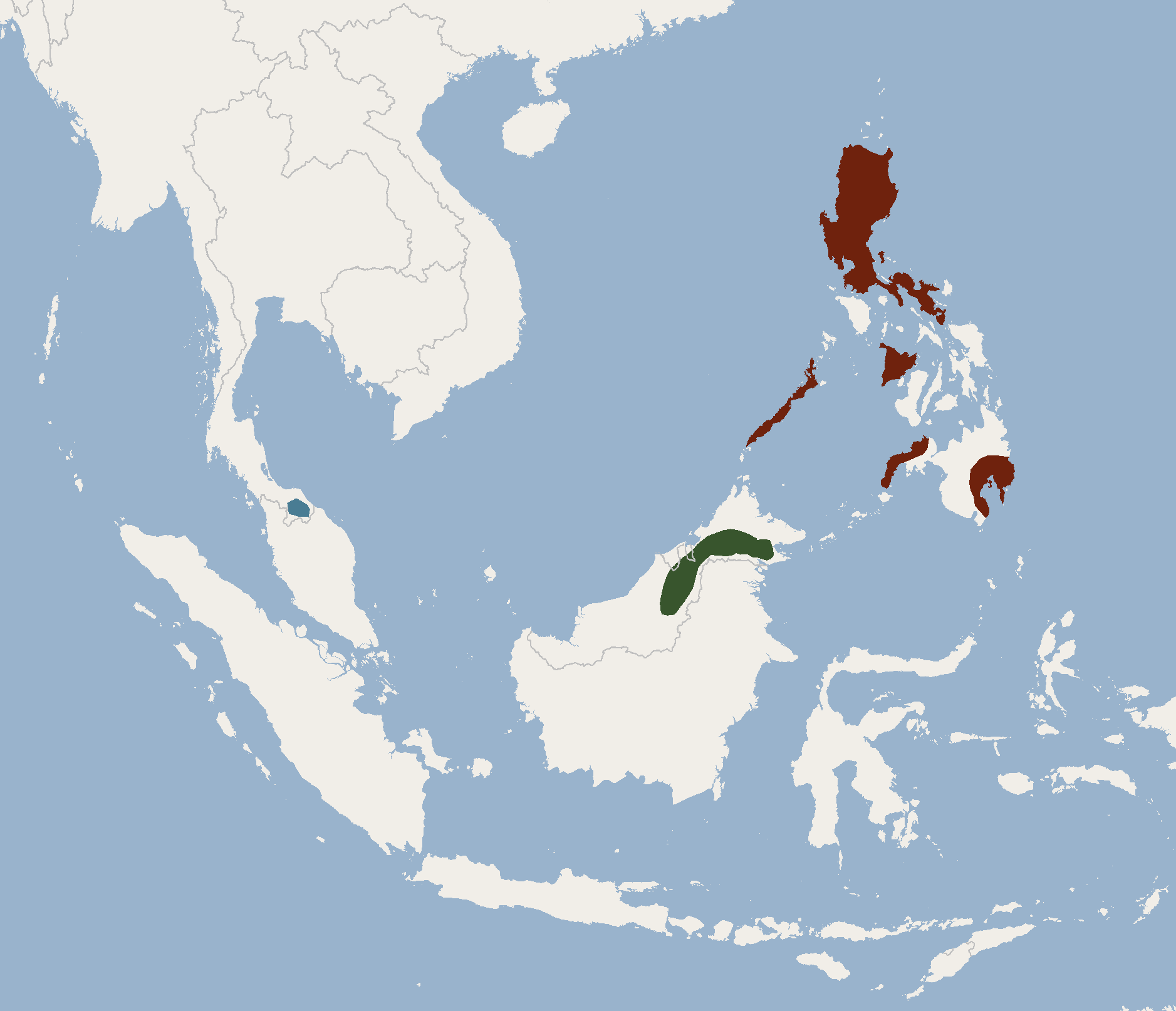

= Whitehead's woolly bat =

Species of bat

Whitehead's woolly bat (Kerivoula whiteheadi) is a species of vesper bat in the family Vespertilionidae. It is found in Brunei, Indonesia, Malaysia, the Philippines, and Thailand.
