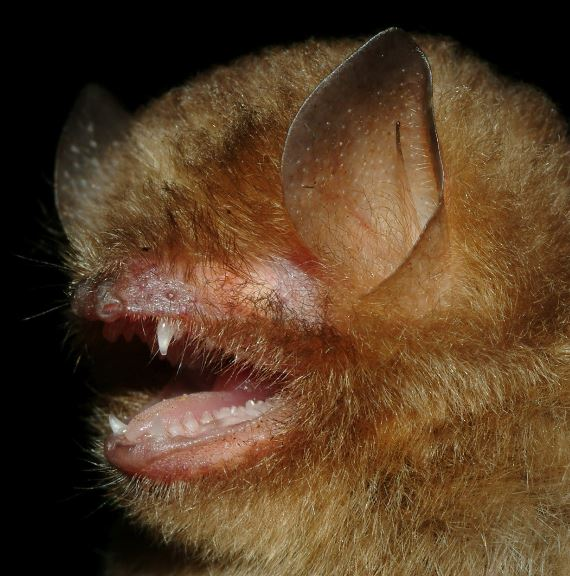

Conservation status
- Least Concern (IUCN 3.1)

Scientific classification
- Kingdom: Animalia
- Phylum: Chordata
- Class: Mammalia
- Order: Chiroptera
- Family: Vespertilionidae
- Genus: Kerivoula
- Species: K. papillosa

Binomial name
- Kerivoula papillosa Temminck, 1840
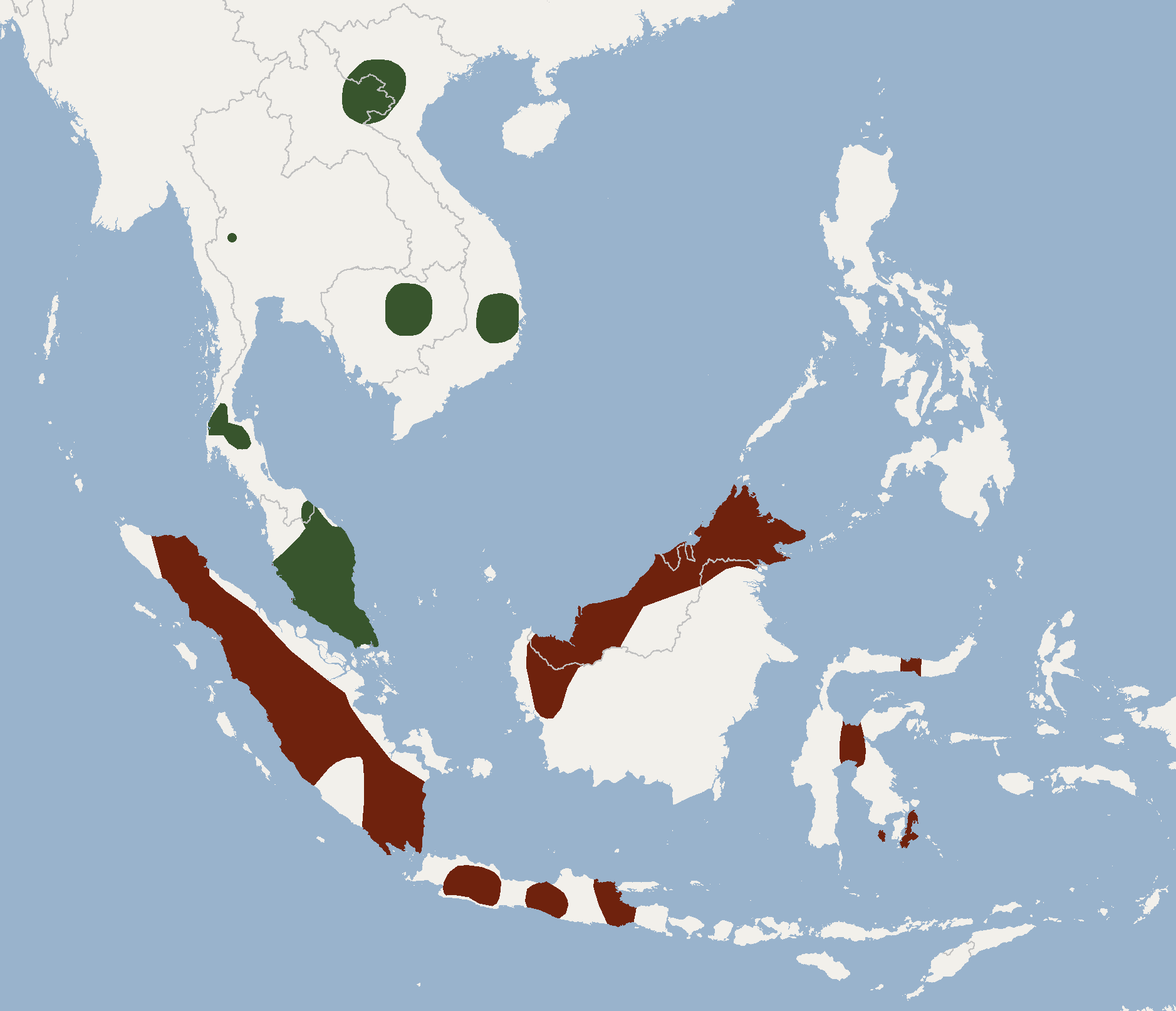

= Papillose woolly bat =

Species of bat

The papillose woolly bat (Kerivoula papillosa) is a species of vesper bat in the family Vespertilionidae. It is found in Brunei, India, Indonesia, Malaysia, and Vietnam.

== Appearance ==
The fur is typically dark brown on top, and lighter brown on the bottom. White hair is commonly found on the foot as well. This species has a unique interfemoral membrane. This membrane is hairless and is covered with small, soft, wart-like projections. The teeth are pointed and specialized for crushing the exoskeletons of insects.

== Ecology ==
Tree hollows are used for roosts, and generally have between 1 and 14 bats inhabiting them. The habitats inhabited are lowland mixed deciduous forests in the lower Asian peninsula.
