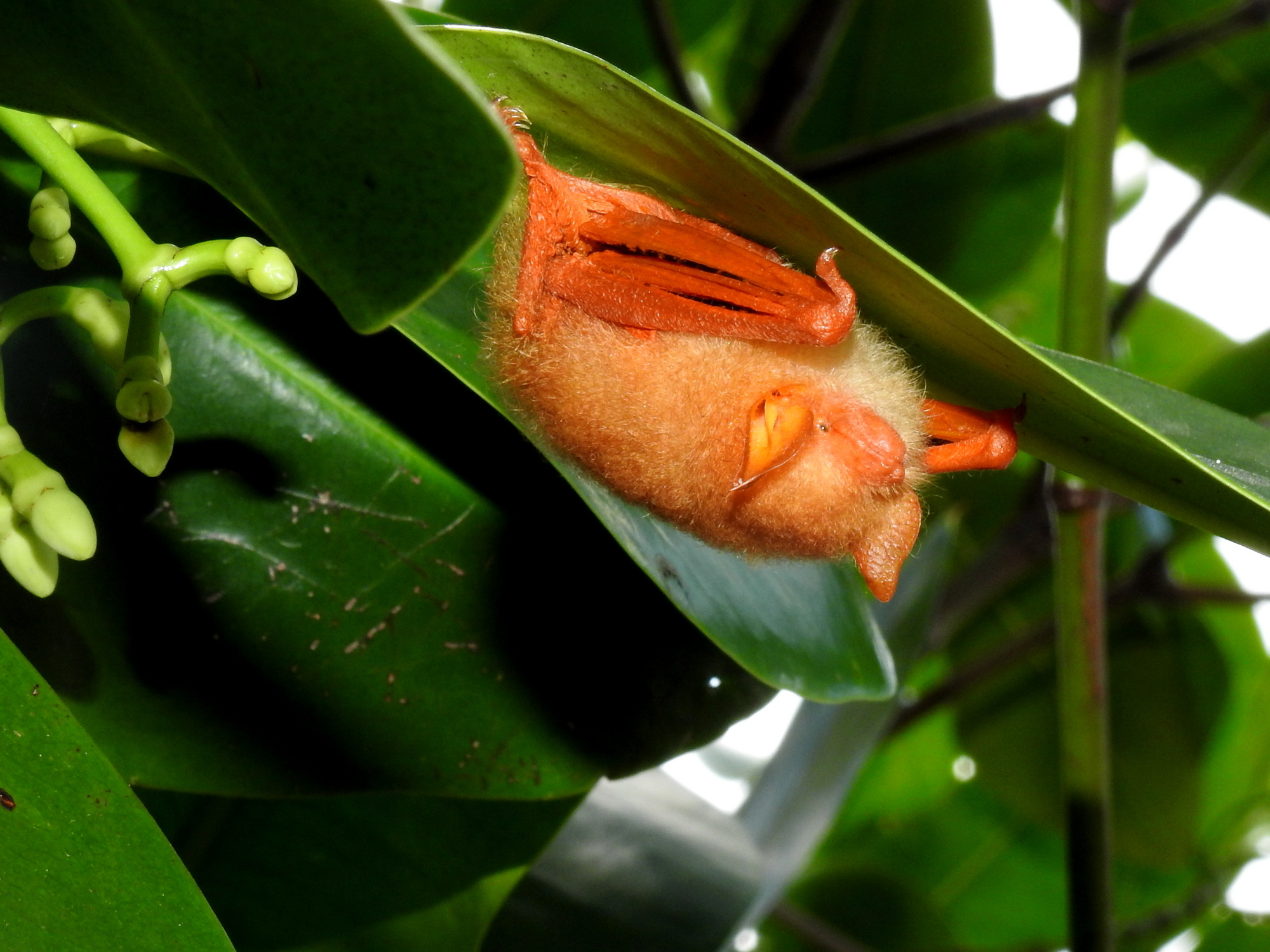

Conservation status
- Near Threatened (IUCN 3.1)

Scientific classification
- Kingdom: Animalia
- Phylum: Chordata
- Class: Mammalia
- Order: Chiroptera
- Family: Vespertilionidae
- Genus: Kerivoula
- Species: K. picta

Binomial name
- Kerivoula picta (Pallas, 1767)
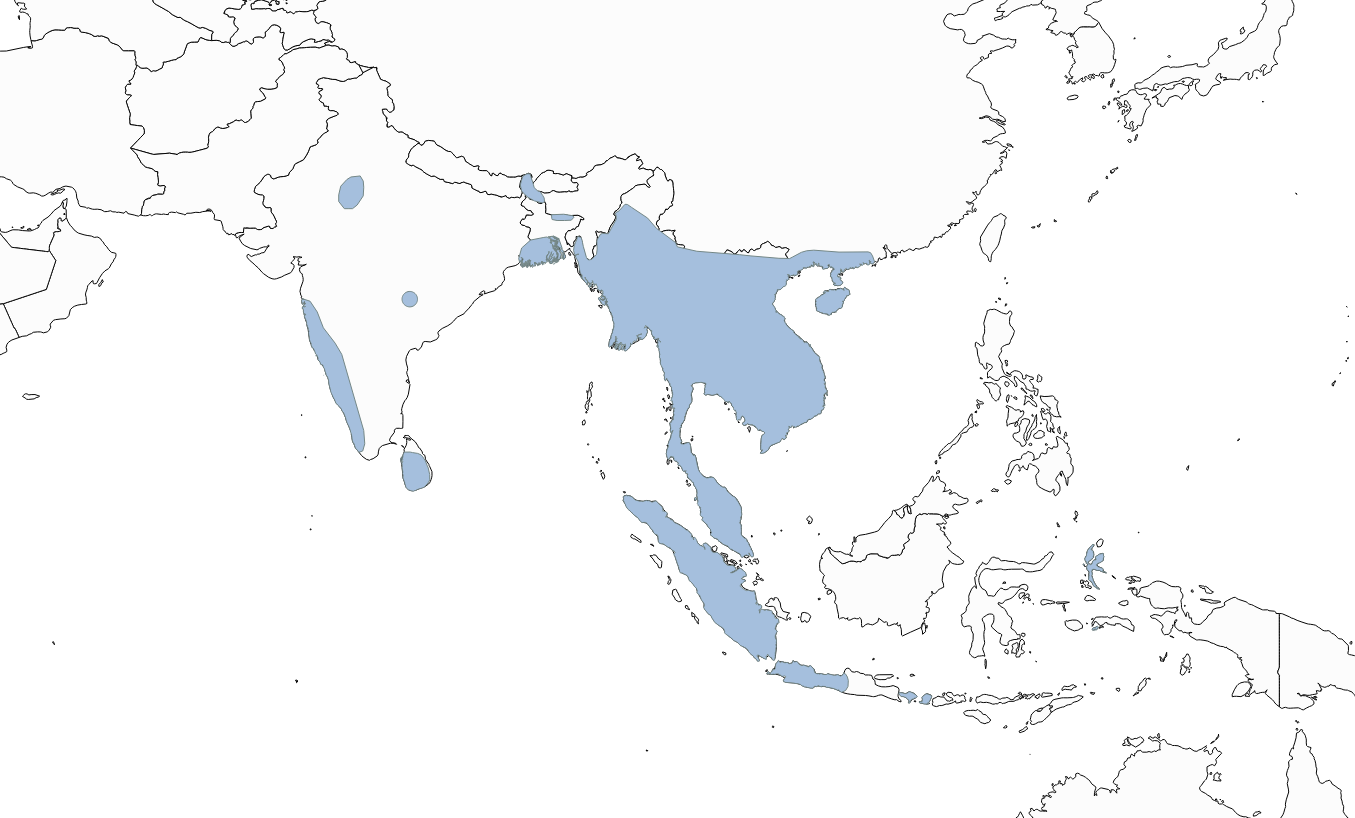
- Species distribution (in southeast Asia) based on data from the IUCN.

= Painted bat =

Species of bat

The painted bat (Kerivoula picta) or painted wooly bat is a species of vesper bat in the family Vespertilionidae. It is also known as "butterfly bat" (projapoti badur), "rongin chamchika" (coloured bat) or "komola-badami chamchika" (orange-brown bat) in Bengali.

== Habitat ==
It is found in Bangladesh (in forested areas, especially in Dhaka Division), Brunei, Burma, Cambodia, China, India, Indonesia, Malaysia, Nepal, Sri Lanka, Thailand and Vietnam. It is found in arid woodland and is fairly uncommon.

The bat had been spotted for the last time in Bangladesh in 1888 according to The Fauna of British India by W.T. Blanford. On Bangladesh Red List published in 2015 by IUCN and the Forest Department of Bangladesh, the bat was described as "data deficient". The IUCN classifies Kerivoula picta as near threatened. The species was thought to have been extinct before rediscovery after 133 years in Madhupur National Park in June 2021.

== Description ==
The body and tail are the same length. The body length is 3 to 5.5 cm (1.2 to 2.2 in). The tail length is 3 to 5.5 cm (1.2 to 2.2 in) as well. The wingspan is 18–30 cm (7.1–11.8 in). Weight is about 5 g (0.18 oz).

Kerivoula picta is bright orange or scarlet, with black wings and orange along the fingers. As in other species of Kerivoula, K. picta possesses long, wooly, rather curly hair, a small, fragile form, large funnel-shaped ears and 38 teeth. Ears are naked, relatively large with rounded tip. Tragus is long, narrow, and transparent. Muzzle is very hairy with naked nostrils. Older males are brighter than females.

== Behavior ==
Painted bats are nocturnal or crepuscular. Small groups of these animals are often found in unusual roosting sites such as in the suspended nests of weaver finches and sunbirds, banana tree leaves, or under the eaves of huts. Painted bats have been known to roost in pairs or in groups of only 2–6 bats. They apparently aestivate during the day, as they are relatively sluggish when disturbed. The bright and broken coloration of these bats may be a form of camouflage to protect them, as they have been reported to blend in with dried leaves and flowers when they roost. They live on small insects. Hunting flights last around 1–2 hours.

Not very much is known about their reproduction and lifespan. However, they form nuclear family units consisting of a mother, a father, and an offspring. They breed between June and August. Female bats give birth to a single offspring.

The echolocation characteristics and the presence of a large interfemoral membrane, a characteristic feature of family Vespertilionidae, suggest that K. picta is an aerial hawker, i.e. capturing insects during flight using the interfemoral membrane as a net.

== Echolocation ==
Echolocation for this species is relatively similar to other species of Kerivoula. Recorded calls were broadband and steep calls ranging from 156.9 kHz to 41.5 kHz. Flight and resting echolocation calls differed every way except the peak frequency. Bats with higher starting frequencies appear to be better at catching prey close to clutter than those with lower frequencies. This is significant considering the amount of debris that is normally around their habitat.

== Conservation ==
Painted wooly bats are hunted, taxidermied and sold online. Sellers may include the bats in a variety of commercial products. Academic researchers believe this practice to be harmful to an already scarce wild population as these bats cannot be farmed and can only raise one pup at a time. At least 856 listings featuring Kerivoula picta have been identified.

Taxidermied specimens of Kerivoula picta and other bat species are also sold as souvenirs to tourists in Ho Chi Minh City, Vietnam. Scientists found painted bats rare around Ho Chi Minh City and in the Mekong Delta, likely due to overharvesting, and recommend Vietnam to submit the species to the CITES in order to restrict international trade.
