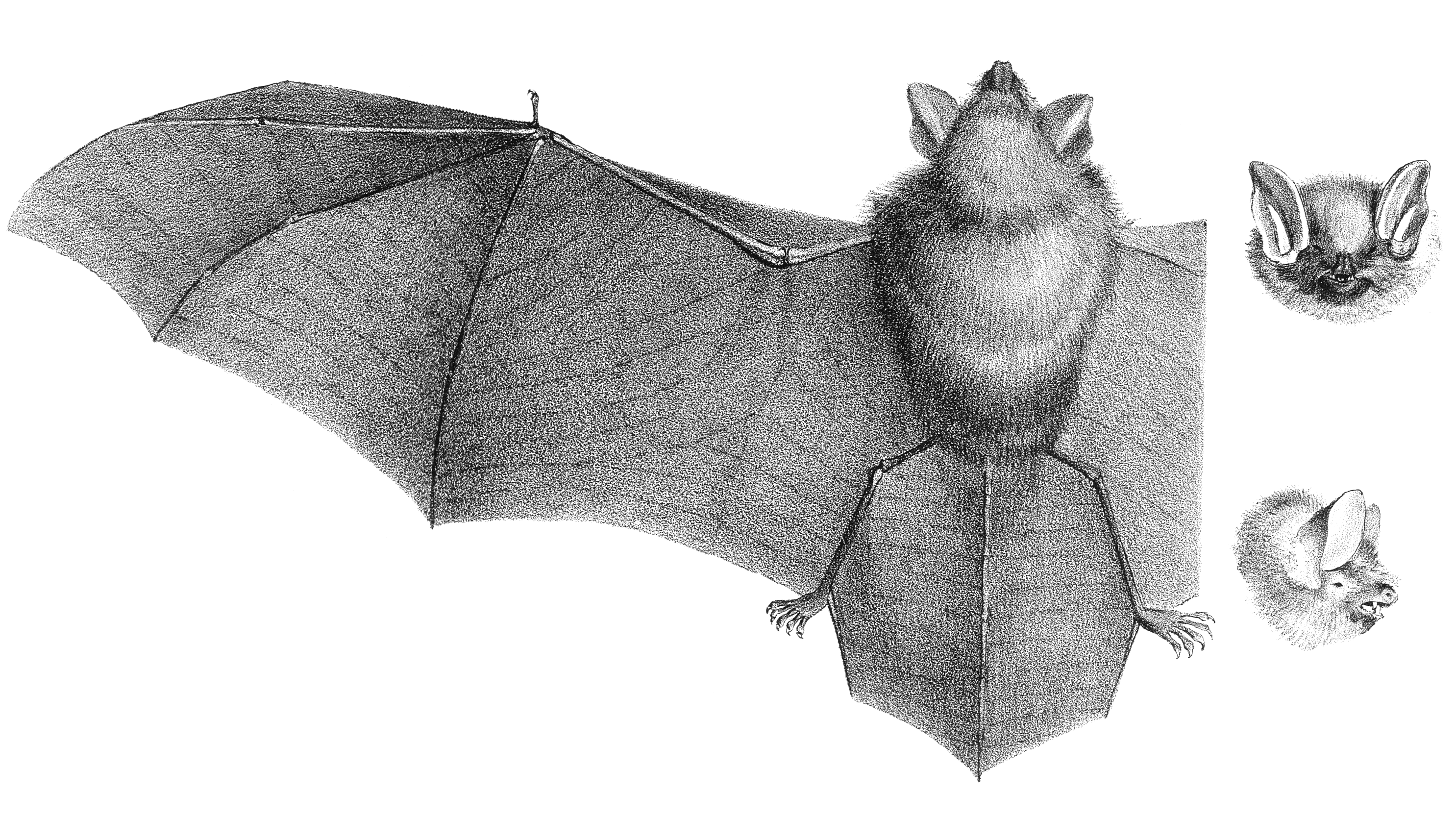

Conservation status
- Least Concern (IUCN 3.1)

Scientific classification
- Kingdom: Animalia
- Phylum: Chordata
- Class: Mammalia
- Infraclass: Placentalia
- Order: Chiroptera
- Family: Vespertilionidae
- Genus: Kerivoula
- Species: K. hardwickii

Binomial name
- Kerivoula hardwickii (Horsfield, 1824)
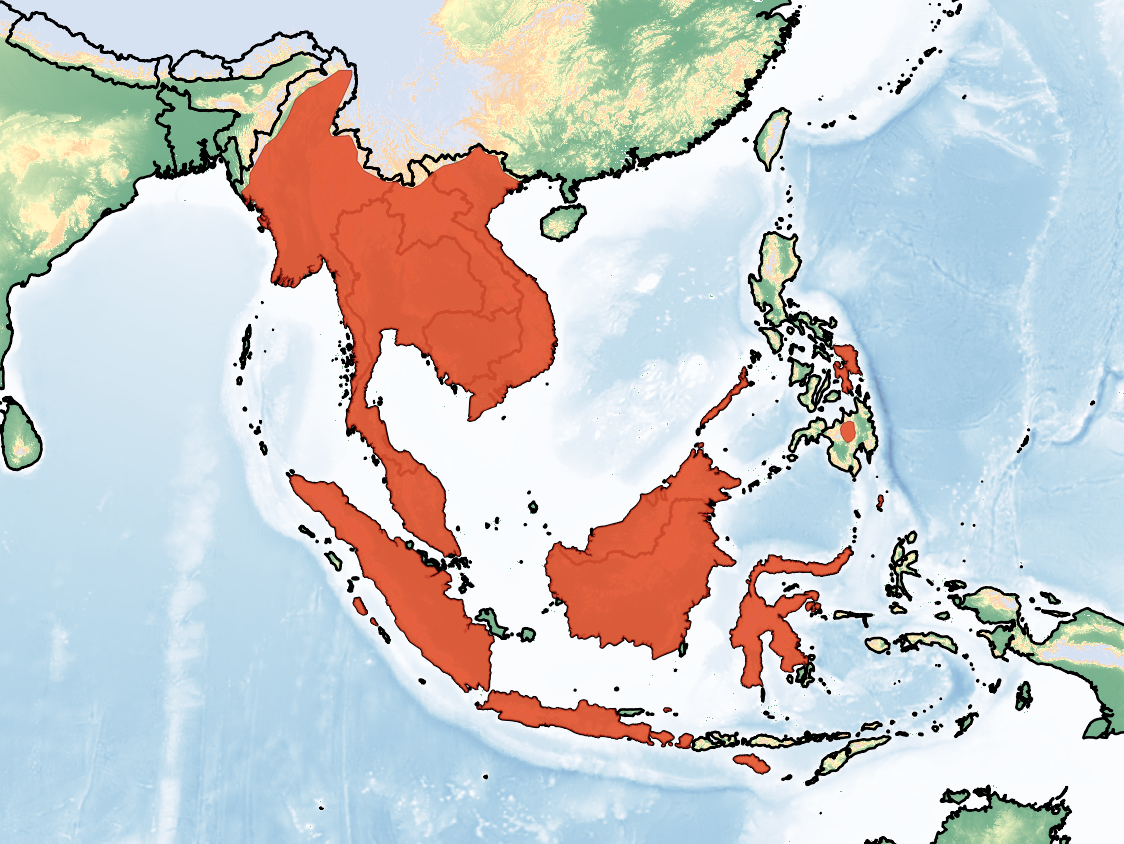

= Hardwicke's woolly bat =

Species of species of vesper bat in the family Vespertilionidae

Hardwicke's woolly bat (Kerivoula hardwickii) is a species of vesper bat in the family Vespertilionidae.

== Geographic range ==
It is found in Bangladesh, China, India (Assam, Jammu and Kashmir, Karnataka, Meghalaya, Mizoram, Nagaland and West Bengal), Indonesia, Laos, Malaysia, Myanmar, Pakistan (Punjab), Philippines, Sri Lanka (Central Province), Thailand, Singapore and Vietnam. Its upper elevation limits are 2,500 meters and 100 meters above sea level. The current population of these bats is stable.

== Habitat and ecology ==
In Southeast China this mammal is found to be quite common in the forest, but the number found, the population sizes, and ecological trends are unknown in South Asia. The only known information for the bat in this area is that it can be found in the warmer valleys of northeast Indonesia and in rice pad fields in Sri Lanka. They are also reported to be seen roosting in caves and buildings in the forests in these regions. This bat is mostly found in the tropical and subtropical regions in China, but has also been reported in forests and farming fields in these regions. They can also be found foraging in residential areas and roosting on rooftops. This bat can be found in a variety of forests in these regions including, primary, dry, hill forests, and lowland, montane, and ridgetop forests in all of these regions. They have also been seen roosting in rattan vine leaf in Indonesia and even a bamboo thicket in the Philippines.

The bat has also been found to inhabit the forest understory of these regions and roosts in hollow trees or dead clusters of leaves. As typical with understory bats, this species is slow flying and highly maneuverable.

== Assessment ==
This bat is listed as least concern. This is because of the suspected large population that has a wide geographic distribution. The bat can also sustain habitat modifications and is well known in protected areas, which makes it less likely to for its population to decline. The bat's population has been assessed by the IUCN in 1996 and 2008 and has remained at low risk/least concern.

== Appearance ==
The fur on the dorsal, or backside, of the bat is typically a smoky brown color while the ventral portion is a lighter greyish-brown color. A forearm length for this bat is typically 31–36 millimeters (1.2–1.4 in), and the ears are approximately 11–15 millimeters (0.43–0.59 in). This species also has a more prominent size difference in the size of its premolars than other Kerivoula species, such as the painted bat Wing membrane is blackish-brown but translucent. The fur is very soft and of moderate length.

== Association with pitcher plants ==
This small bat has been found roosting above the digestive fluid in the pitchers of the carnivorous plant Nepenthes hemsleyana (previously known as Nepenthes baramensis and informally as Nepenthes rafflesiana var. elongata), which grows in the peat swamp forest and heath forests of Borneo. This relationship appears to be mutualistic, with the plant providing shelter for the bats and in return receiving additional nitrogen input in the form of faeces. It has been estimated that the plant derives 34% of its total foliar nitrogen from the bats' droppings.
