= List of critically endangered mammals =

- Extinct in the wild (EW): 1 species
- Critically endangered (CR): 236 species
- Endangered (EN): 565 species
- Vulnerable (VU): 571 species
- Near threatened (NT): 405 species
- Least concern (LC): 3,407 species
- Data deficient (DD): 789 species
Mammalian species (IUCN, 2026.1)
- 6,054 extant species have been evaluated
- 5,328 of those are fully assessed (Note: excludes data deficient evaluations.)
- 4,682 are not threatened at present (Note: NT and LC.)
- 1,372 to 2,179 are threatened (Note: Threatened comprises CR, EN and VU. Upper estimate additionally includes DD.)
- 97 to 126 are extinct or extinct in the wild:
  - 96 extinct (EX) species (Note: Chart omits extinct (EX) species)
  - 1 extinct in the wild (EW)
  - 29 possibly extinct [CR(PE)]
  - 0 possibly extinct in the wild [CR(PEW)]

Critically endangered (CR) species face an extremely high risk of extinction in the wild.

As of October 2026, the International Union for Conservation of Nature (IUCN) listed 236 critically endangered mammalian species, including 29 which are tagged as possibly extinct. Of all evaluated mammalian species, 3.9% are listed as critically endangered. The IUCN also lists 59 mammalian subspecies as critically endangered.

Of the subpopulations of mammals evaluated by the IUCN, 22 species subpopulations have been assessed as critically endangered.

Additionally 773 mammalian species (12.8% of those evaluated) are listed as data deficient, meaning there is insufficient information for a full assessment of conservation status. As these species typically have small distributions and/or populations, they are intrinsically likely to be threatened, according to the IUCN. While the category of data deficient indicates that no assessment of extinction risk has been made for the taxa, the IUCN notes that it may be appropriate to give them "the same degree of attention as threatened taxa, at least until their status can be assessed".

This is a complete list of critically endangered mammalian species and subspecies evaluated by the IUCN. Species considered possibly extinct by the IUCN are marked as such. Species and subspecies which have critically endangered subpopulations (or stocks) are indicated. Where possible common names for taxa are given while links point to the scientific name used by the IUCN.

== Primates ==
There are 88 species and 37 subspecies of primates assessed as critically endangered.

=== Gibbons ===
Species

- Black crested gibbon
  - Tonkin black crested gibbon
  - West Yunnan black crested gibbon
  - Central Yunnan black crested gibbon
  - Laotian black crested gibbon
- Hainan black crested gibbon
- Northern white-cheeked gibbon
- Eastern black crested gibbon
- Southern white-cheeked gibbon

=== Great apes ===
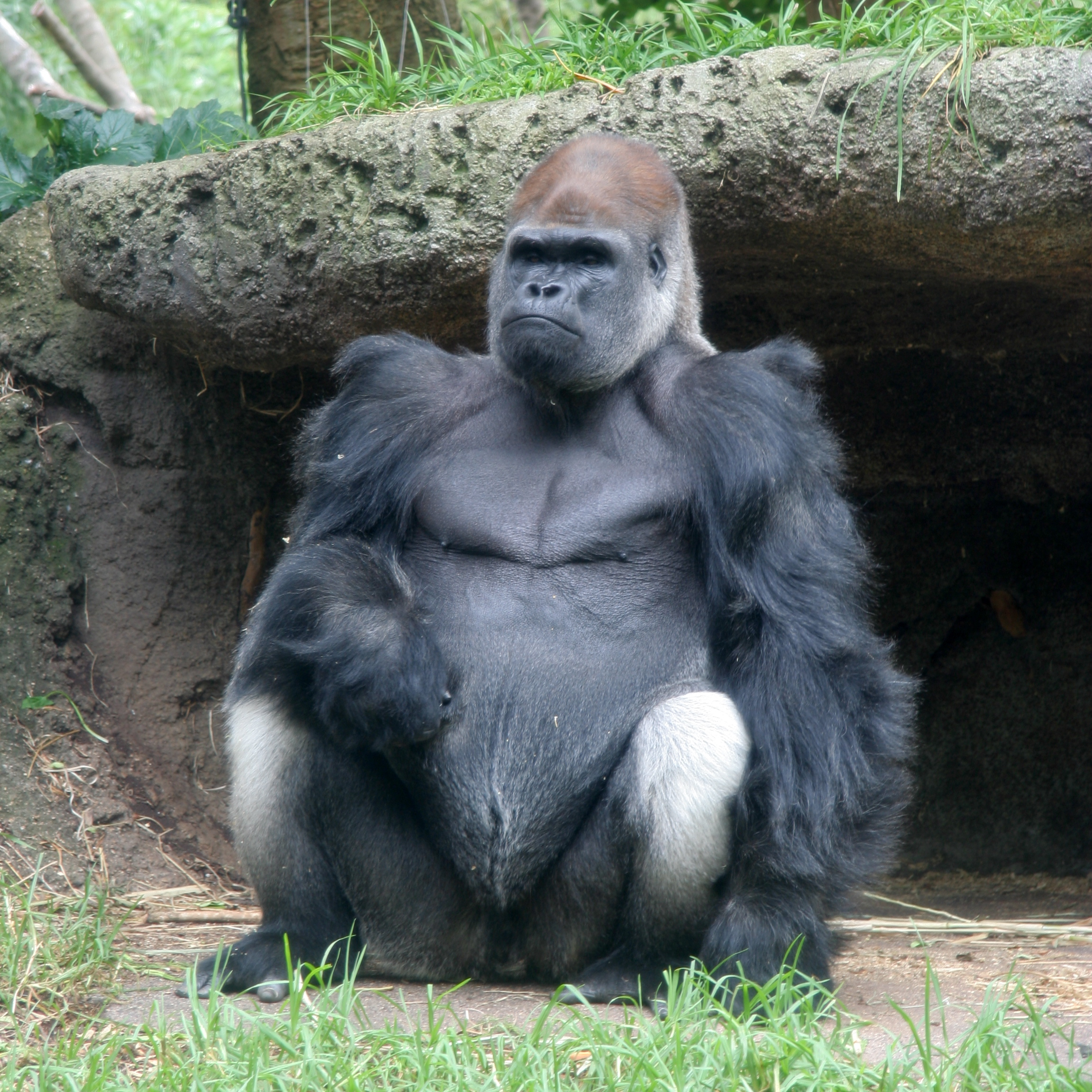
Western gorilla

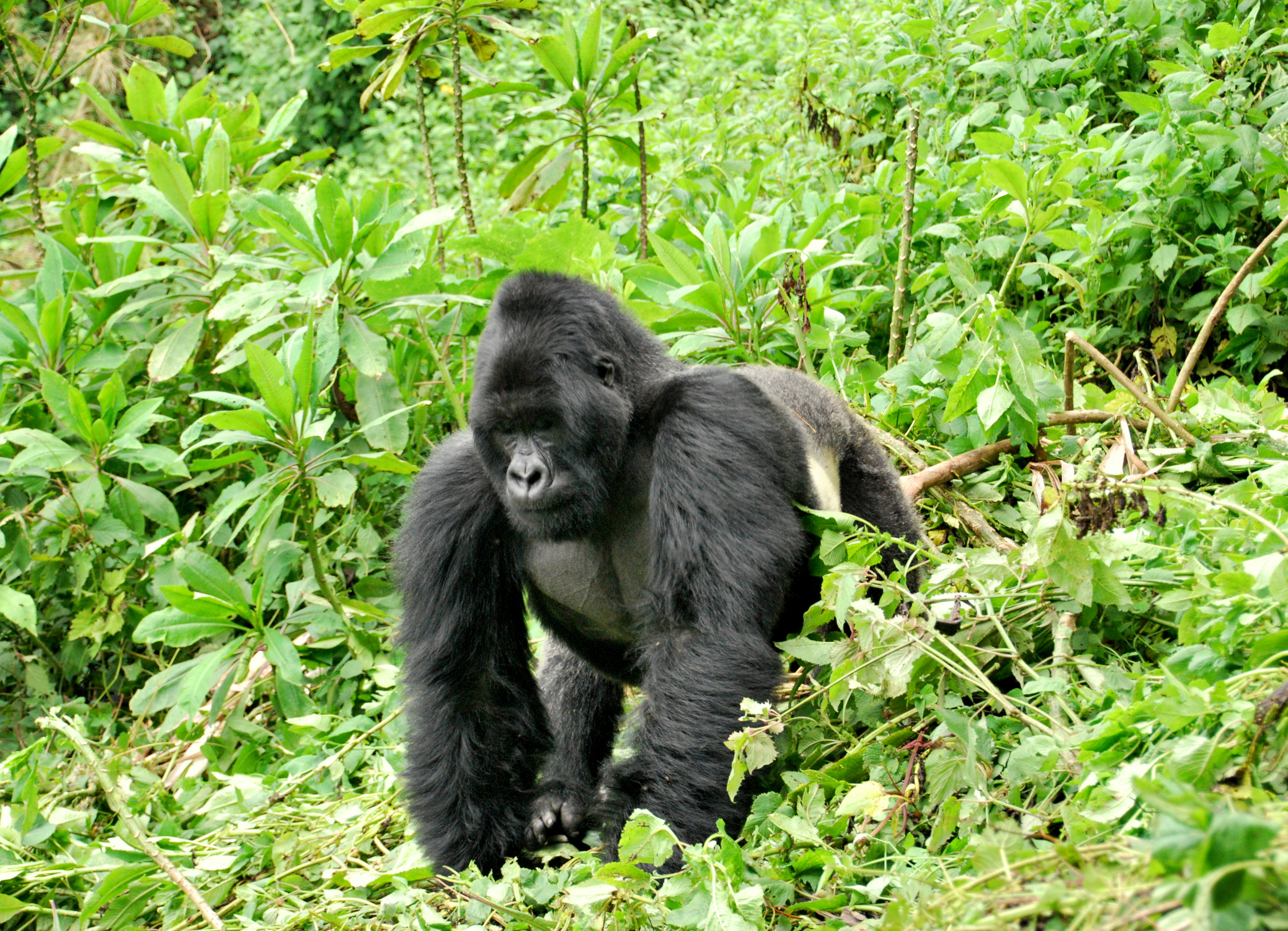
Eastern gorilla

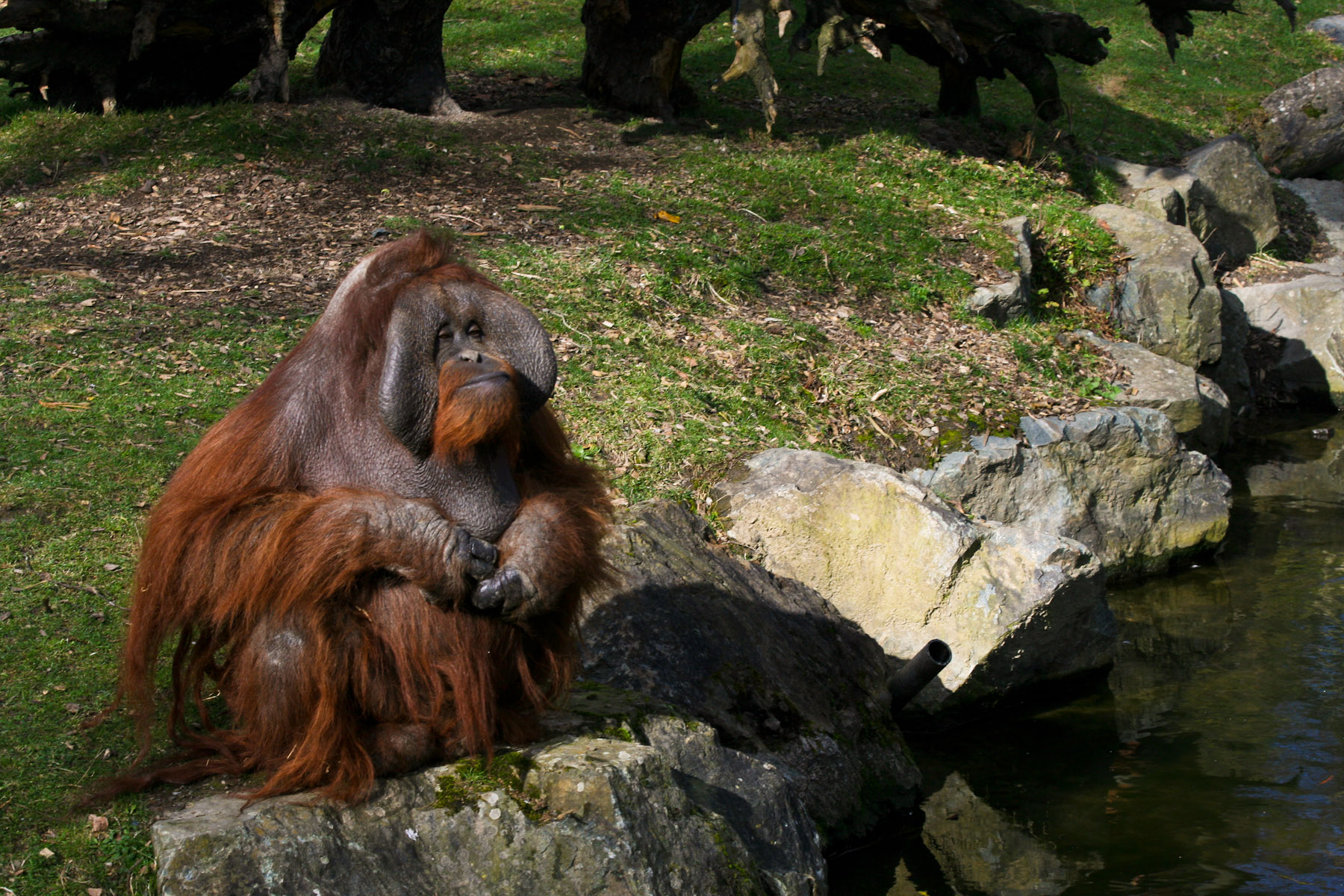
Bornean orangutan

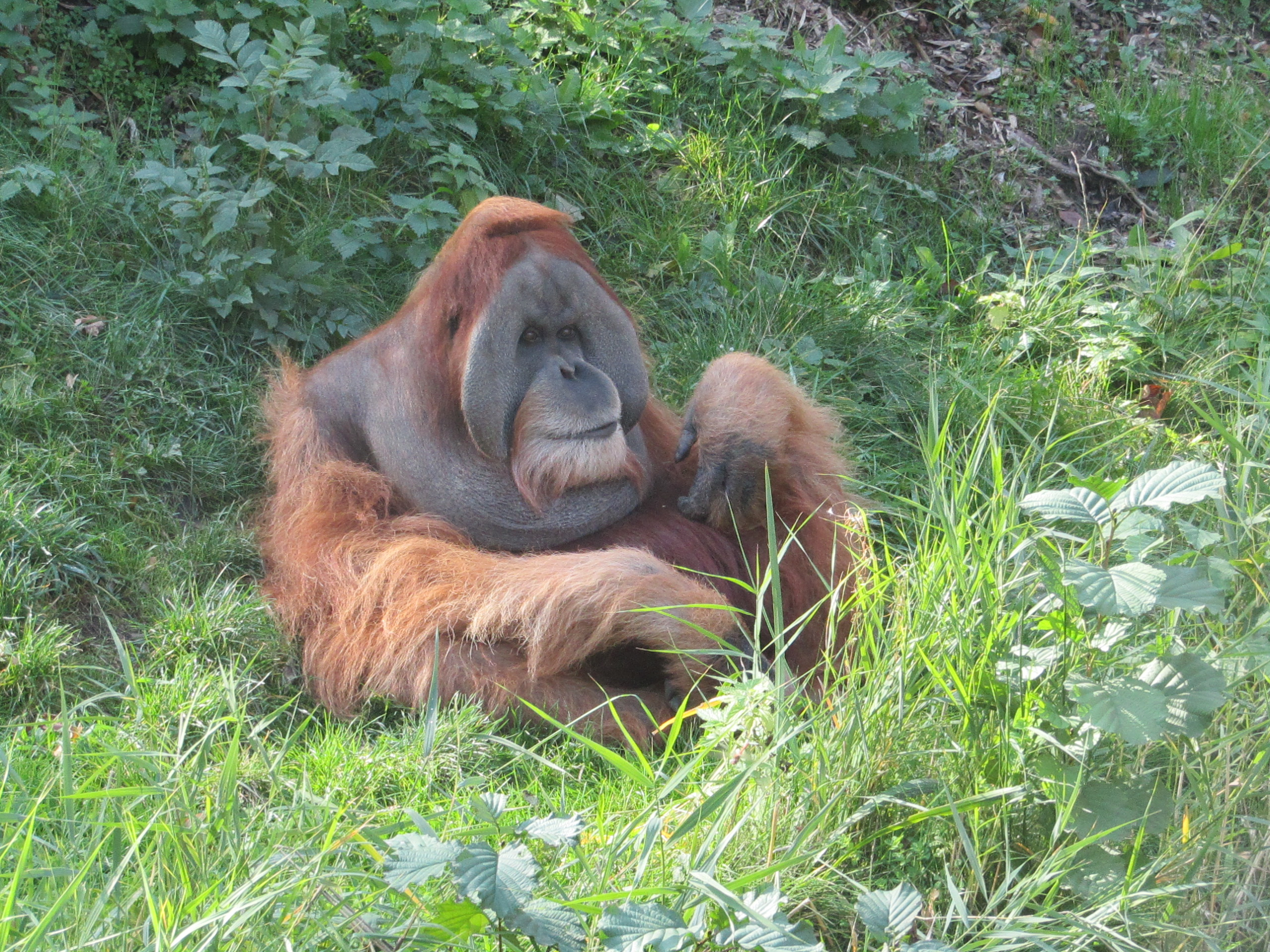
Sumatran orangutan

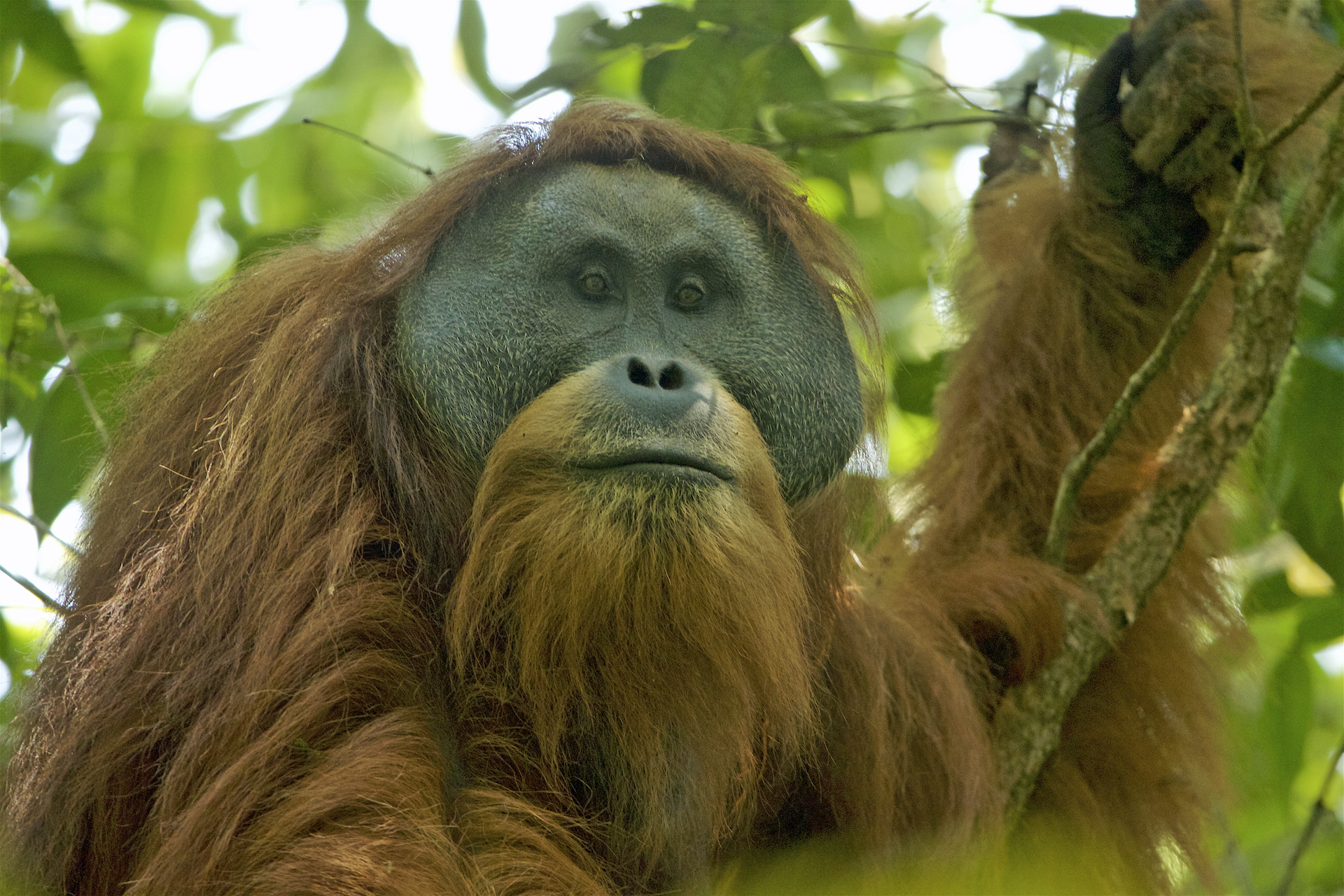
Tapanuli orangutan

Species

- Eastern gorilla
  - Eastern lowland gorilla
- Western gorilla
  - Cross River gorilla
  - Western lowland gorilla
- Bornean orangutan
- Sumatran orangutan
- Tapanuli orangutan

Subspecies

- Western chimpanzee

=== Lemurs ===
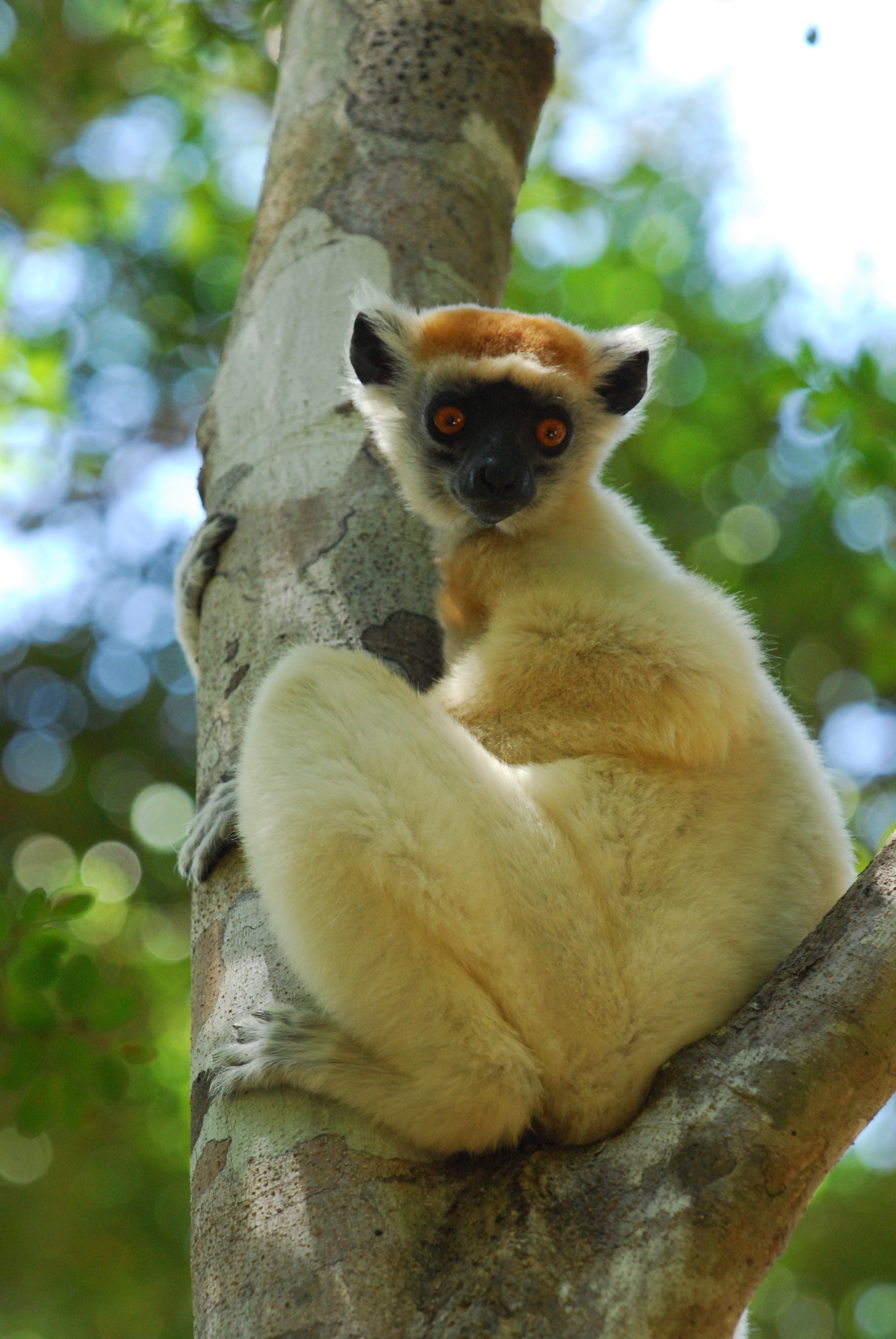
Golden-crowned sifaka

Species

- Sibree's dwarf lemur
- Gray-headed lemur
- Blue-eyed black lemur
- Mongoose lemur
- Lac Alaotra bamboo lemur
- Golden bamboo lemur
- Greater bamboo lemur
- Indri
- Manombo sportive lemur
- Sahamalaza sportive lemur
- Northern sportive lemur
- Hawks' sportive lemur
- Gerp's mouse lemur
- Marohita mouse lemur
- Silky sifaka
- Diademed sifaka
- Perrier's sifaka
- Golden-crowned sifaka
- Crowned sifaka
- Red ruffed lemur
- Black-and-white ruffed lemur

Subspecies

- Southern black-and-white ruffed lemur
- Northern black-and-white ruffed lemur
- Pied black-and-white ruffed lemur

==== Sportive lemurs ====
- Ahmanson's sportive lemur
- Holland's sportive lemur
- Mittermeier's sportive lemur
- Red-tailed sportive lemur

=== Tarsiers ===
Species

- Siau Island tarsier

Subspecies

- Natuna Islands tarsier

=== Old World monkeys ===
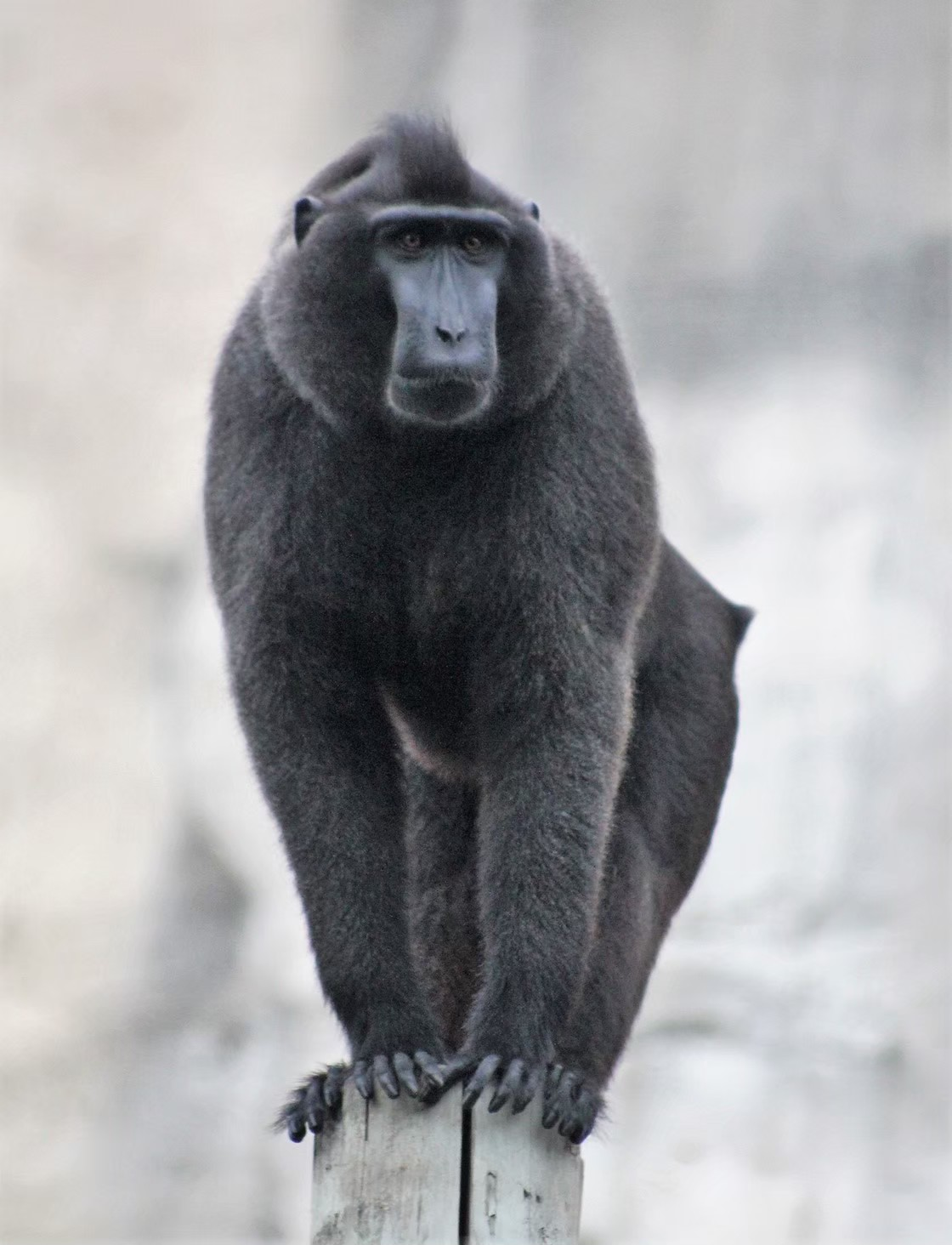
Celebes crested macaque

Species

- Tana River mangabey
- Roloway monkey
- Ursine colobus
- Celebes crested macaque
- Pagai Island macaque
- Niger Delta red colobus
- Preuss's red colobus
- Miss Waldron's red colobus (possibly extinct)
- Sarawak surili
- Red-shanked douc
- Gray-shanked douc
- Black-shanked douc
- Tonkin snub-nosed monkey
- Myanmar snub-nosed monkey
- Pig-tailed langur
- Delacour's langur
- Cat Ba langur
- White-headed langur
- Popa langur

Subspecies

- Zammarano's monkey
- Presbytis chrysomelas chrysomelas
- Tricolored langur
- Golden-bellied Mentawai Island langur
- Western purple-faced langur
- Pagai Island pig-tailed snub-nosed monkey
- Siberut Island pig-tailed snub-nosed monkey
- Natuna Islands silvery lutung

=== New World monkeys ===
Species

- Brown spider monkey
- Northern muriqui
- Blond titi monkey
- Caquetá titi
- Rio Mayo titi
- Ecuadorian white-fronted capuchin
- Kaapori capuchin
- Yellow-tailed woolly monkey
- Cotton-top tamarin
- Golden-bellied capuchin

Subspecies

- Northern brown howler
- Mexican howler
- Azuero howler
- Brown-headed spider monkey
- Colombian spider monkey
- Azuero spider monkey
- Nicaraguan spider monkey
- Mexican spider monkey
- Ateles hybridus brunneus
- Hybrid spider monkey
- Colombian woolly monkey
- Margarita Island capuchin

=== Lorisoidea ===
- Javan slow loris
- Bangka slow loris (possibly extinct)
- Mount Kenya potto (ssp. stockleyi, possibly extinct)

== Odd-toed ungulates ==
Species

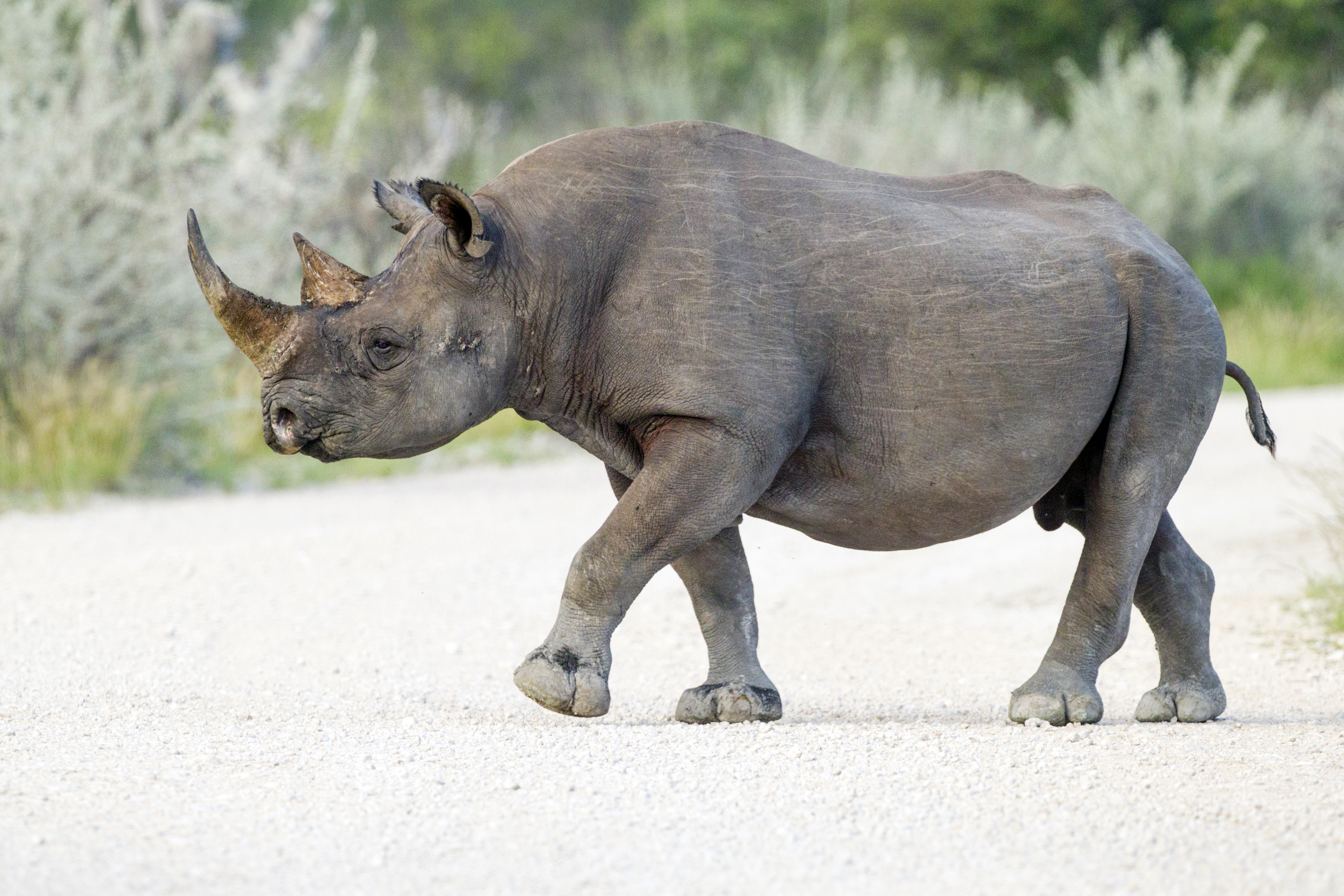
Black rhinoceros in Etosha National Park

- Sumatran rhinoceros
- Black rhinoceros
  - Eastern black rhinoceros
  - South-central black rhinoceros
- African wild donkey
- Javan rhinoceros

Subspecies

- Northern white rhinoceros (possibly extinct in the wild)
- Persian onager

== Cetartiodactyls ==
Cetartiodactyla includes dolphins, whales and even-toed ungulates. There are 16 species, 12 subspecies, and 15 subpopulations of cetartiodactyl assessed as critically endangered.

=== Non-cetacean even-toed ungulates ===
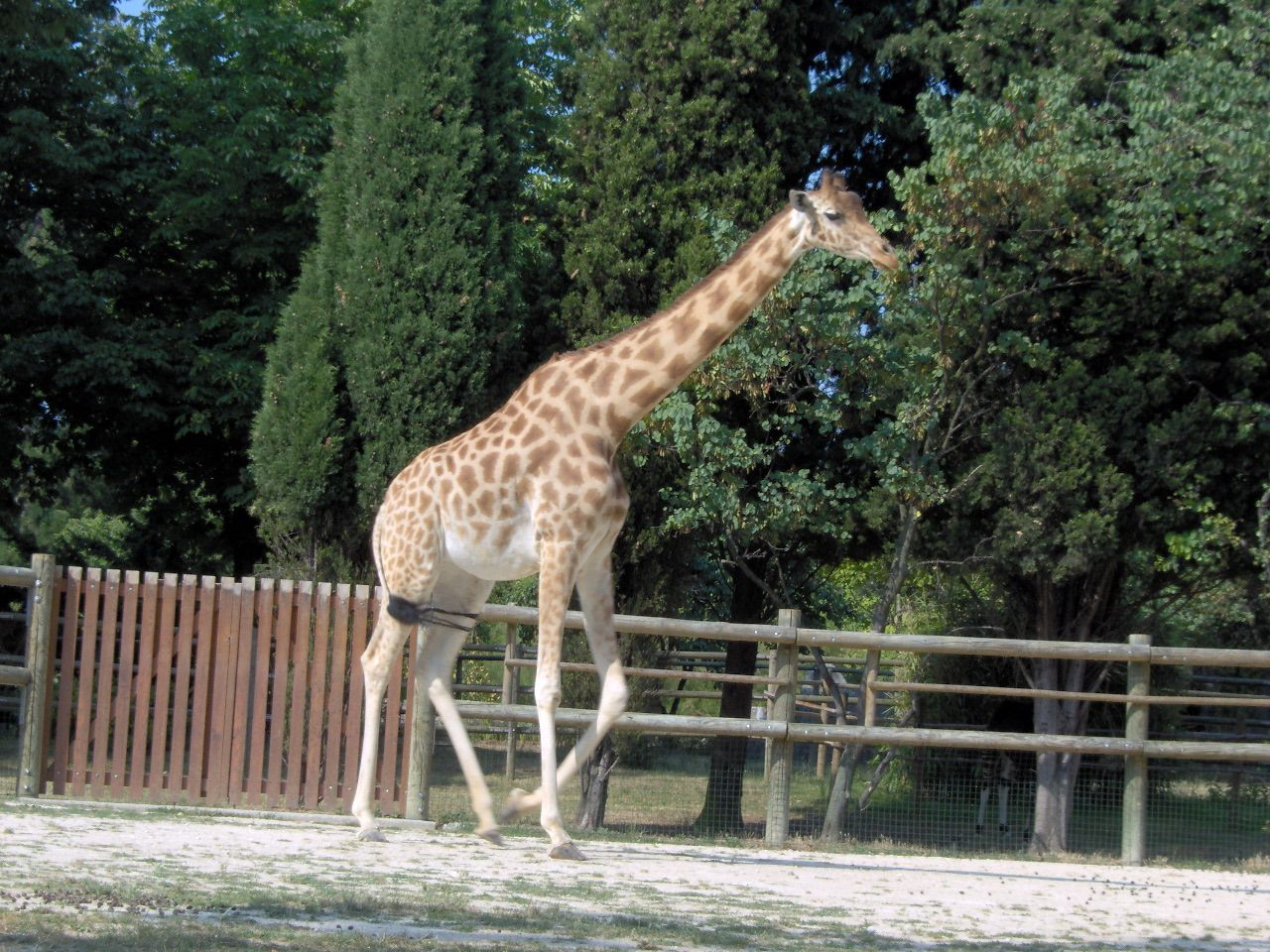
Kordofan giraffe at Paris Zoological Park

Species

- Addax
- Bawean deer
- Hirola
- Banteng
- Kouprey (possibly extinct)
- Tamaraw
- Walia ibex
- Giant muntjac
- Dama gazelle
- Saola
- Visayan warty pig

Subspecies

- Tora hartebeest (possibly extinct)
- Giant sable antelope
- Upemba lechwe
- Russian saiga
- Western giant eland
- Mountain bongo
- Kordofan giraffe
- Nubian giraffe

=== Cetaceans ===
Species

- Baiji (possibly extinct)
- Vaquita
- Rice's whale
- North Atlantic right whale
- Yangtze finless porpoise
- Atlantic humpback dolphin

Subspecies

- Popoto

Subpopulations

- Bowhead whale (1 subpopulation)
- Beluga whale (1 subpopulation)
- Gray whale (1 subpopulation)
- North Pacific right whale (1 subpopulation)
- Irrawaddy dolphin (5 subpopulations)
- Harbour porpoise (1 subpopulation)
- Indo-Pacific humpbacked dolphin (1 subpopulation)
- Common bottlenose dolphin (1 subpopulation)

== Marsupials ==
- Talaud bear cuscus
- Mountain pygmy possum
- Wondiwoi tree-kangaroo (possibly extinct)
- Golden-mantled tree-kangaroo
- Tenkile
- Black dorcopsis
- Leadbeater's possum
- Northern hairy-nosed wombat
- Handley's slender opossum
- One-striped opossum (possibly extinct)
- Northern glider
- Telefomin cuscus (possibly extinct)
- Gilbert's potoroo
- Western ringtail possum
- Kangaroo Island dunnart
- Black-spotted cuscus
- Blue-eyed spotted cuscus

== Carnivora ==
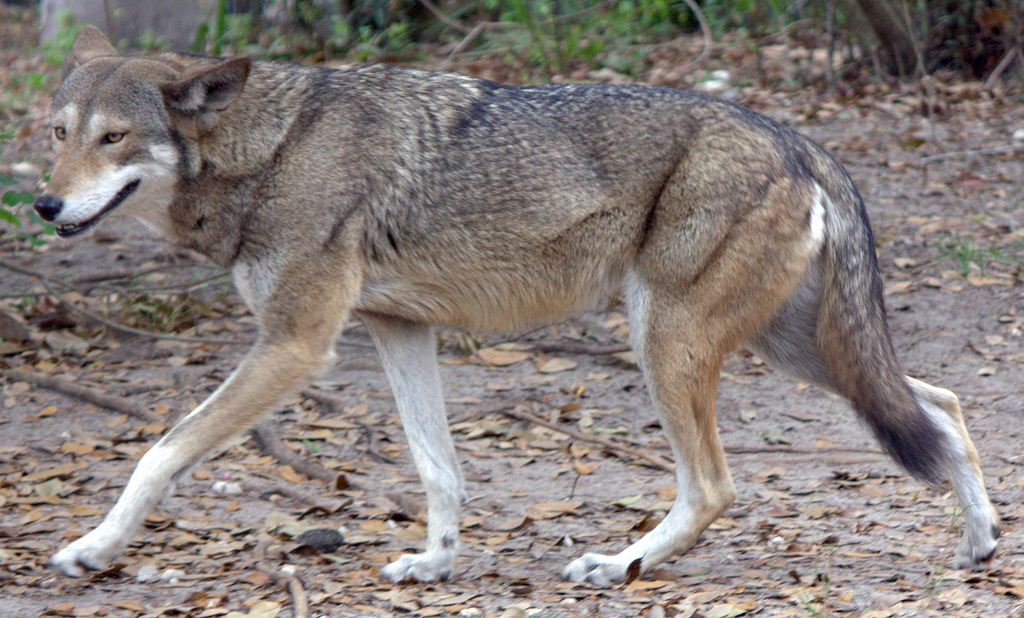
Red wolf

Species

- Red wolf
- European mink
- Cozumel raccoon
- Malabar large-spotted civet (possibly extinct)

Subspecies

- Northwest African cheetah
- Asiatic cheetah
- Balkan lynx
- South China tiger
- Malayan tiger
- Sunda Island tiger
  - Sumatran tiger
- Indochinese leopard
- Arabian leopard
- Amur leopard
- Anatolian leopard
- Iriomote cat

Subpopulations

- Lion (1 subpopulation)
- Anatolian leopard
  - Persian leopard (several subpopulations)

== Eulipotyphla ==
- Phillips' Congo shrew
- Andaman shrew
- Harenna shrew
- Jenkins' shrew
- Nicobar shrew
- Nelson's small-eared shrew
- Eisentraut's mouse shrew
- Sclater's shrew
- San Cristobal shrew
- Russian desman

== Lagomorpha ==
Rabbits and relatives

- Riverine rabbit
- San Jose brush rabbit

== Rodents ==
There are 64 species and 1 subspecies of rodent assessed as critically endangered.

=== Hystricomorpha ===
("Porcupine-like")

- Bolivian chinchilla rat
- Garrido's hutia (possibly extinct)
- Santa Catarina's guinea pig
- Reig's tuco-tuco
- Peruvian tuco-tuco
- Roig's tuco-tuco
- Social tuco-tuco
- Bahamian hutia
- Cabrera's hutia
- Dwarf hutia (possibly extinct)
- San Felipe hutia (possibly extinct)
- Pacific degu
- Mantiqueira Atlantic tree-rat
- Short-furred Atlantic tree-rat
- Red-crested tree rat
- Golden viscacha rat
- Chalchalero viscacha rat

=== Myomorpha ===
There are 37 species in Myomorpha assessed as critically endangered.

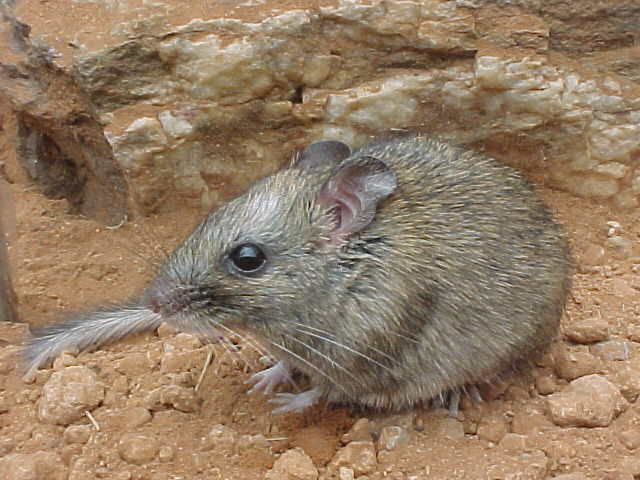
Central rock rat

==== Murids ====
Includes mice, rats, gerbils, and relatives.

- Elvira rat
- Dahl's jird
- Ethiopian amphibious rat (possibly extinct)
- Cheesman's vlei rat (possibly extinct)
- Manus Island spiny rat (possibly extinct)
- Niken's rat
- Poncelet's giant rat
- Muennink's spiny rat
- Biak giant rat
- Emma's giant rat
- Emperor rat (possibly extinct)
- Guadalcanal rat (possibly extinct)
- Carpentarian rock rat
- Central rock rat

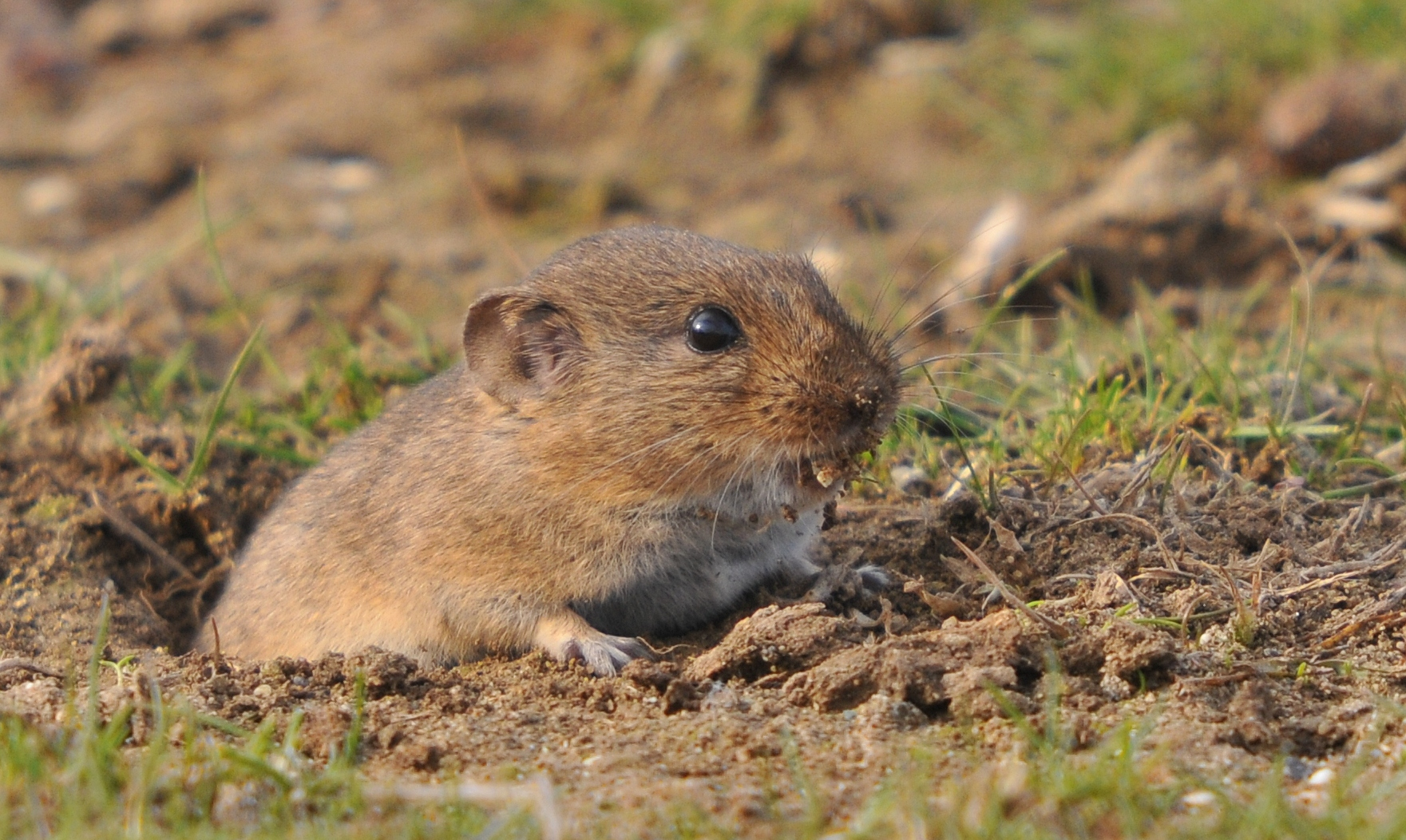
Bavarian pine vole

==== Cricetids ====
Includes true hamsters, voles, lemmings, and New World rats and mice.

- European hamster
- Fossorial giant rat (possibly extinct)
- Chinanteco deer mouse
- Delicate deer mouse
- Ixtlán deer mouse
- Zempoaltepec deer mouse
- Schmidly's deer mouse
- Jico deer mouse
- Zuniga's dark rice rat (possibly extinct)
- Bavarian pine vole
- Nelson's woodrat
- Perote mouse
- Burt's deer mouse
- Dickey's deer mouse
- Angel Island mouse (possibly extinct)
- San Lorenzo mouse
- Maya mouse
- Puebla deer mouse (possiby extinct)
- False canyon mouse
- Catalina deer mouse
- San Esteban Island mouse
- Cozumel harvest mouse
- Chiapan climbing rat (possibly extinct)
- Tumbala climbing rat (possibly extinct)

==== Nesomyids ====
- Mount Kahuzi climbing mouse

==== Sminthids ====
- Severtzov's birch mouse (possibly extinct)

==== Spalacids ====
- Oltenia blind mole-rat (possibly extinct)

=== Castorimorpha ===
("Beaver-like")

Species

- San Quintin kangaroo rat (possibly extinct)
- Big pocket gopher

Subspecies

- Alcorn's pocket gopher

=== Sciuromorpha ===
- Namdapha flying squirrel
- Vancouver Island marmot
- Speckled ground squirrel

== Bats ==
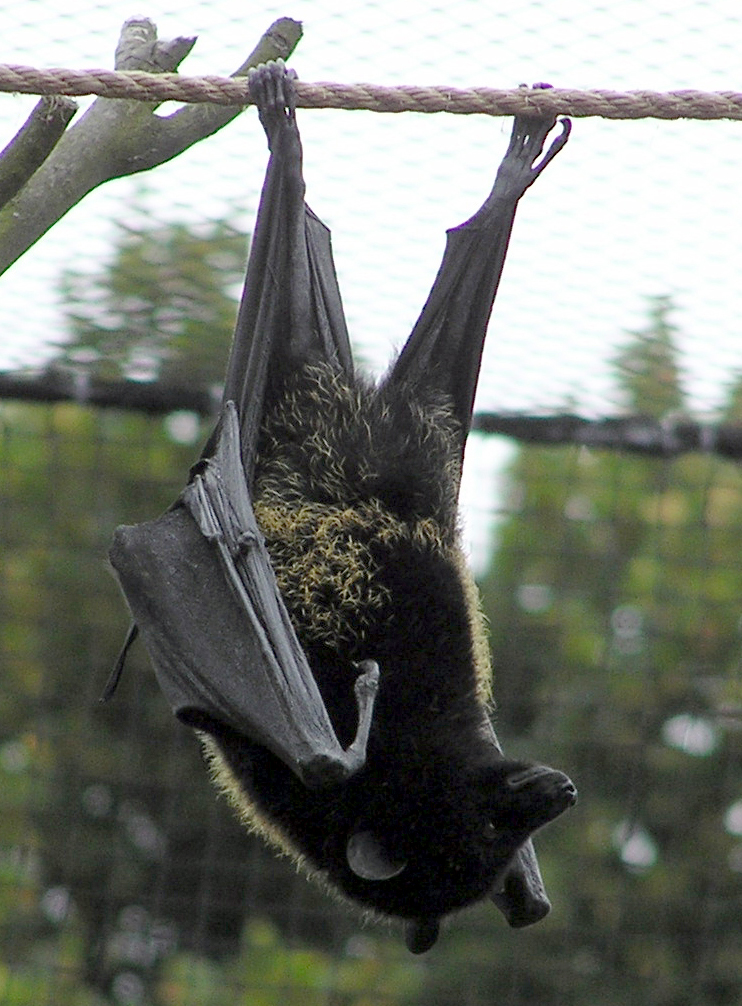
Livingstone's fruit bat

- Bulmer's fruit bat (Aproteles bulmerae)
- New Zealand long-tailed bat (Chalinolobus tuberculatus)
- Seychelles sheath-tailed bat (Coleura seychellensis)
- Philippine naked-backed fruit bat (Dobsonia chapmani)
- Thongaree's disc-nosed bat (Eudiscoderma thongareeae)
- Kolar leaf-nosed bat (Hipposideros hypophyllus)
- Lamotte's roundleaf bat (Hipposideros lamottei)
- Fijian monkey-faced bat (Mirimiri acrodonta)
- Bala tube-nosed bat (Murina balaensis)
- Gloomy tube-nosed bat (Murina tenebrosa) (possibly extinct)
- Armenian whiskered bat (Myotis hajastanicus)
- Yanbaru whiskered bat (Myotis yanbarensis)
- New Zealand greater short-tailed bat (Mystacina robusta) (possibly extinct)
- Jamaican greater funnel-eared bat (Natalus jamaicensis)
- New Caledonian long-eared bat (Nyctophilus nebulosus)
- New Guinea big-eared bat (Pharotis imogene)
- Jamaican flower bat (Phyllonycteris aphylla)
- Canary long-eared bat (Plecotus teneriffae)
- Sardinian long-eared bat (Plecotus sardus)
- Greater monkey-faced bat (Pteralopex flanneryi)
- Montane monkey-faced bat (Pteralopex pulchra) (possibly extinct)
- Aru flying fox (Pteropus aruensis) (possibly extinct)

== Other mammals ==
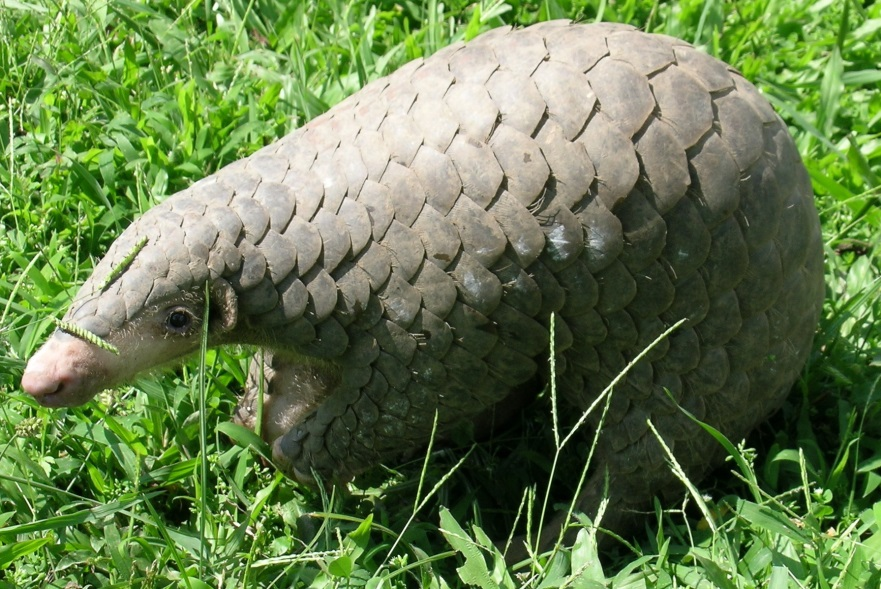
Chinese pangolin

Species

- African forest elephant
- Pygmy three-toed sloth
- De Winton's golden mole (possibly extinct)
- Sunda pangolin
- Chinese pangolin
- Philippine pangolin
- Attenborough's long-beaked echidna
- Western long-beaked echidna

Subspecies

- Sumatran elephant

Subpopulations

- Juliana's golden mole (1 subpopulation)

== See also ==
- Lists of IUCN Red List critically endangered species
- List of least concern mammals
- List of near threatened mammals
- List of vulnerable mammals
- List of endangered mammals
- List of recently extinct mammals
- List of data deficient mammals
