= List of endangered mammals =

- Extinct in the wild (EW): 1 species
- Critically endangered (CR): 236 species
- Endangered (EN): 565 species
- Vulnerable (VU): 571 species
- Near threatened (NT): 405 species
- Least concern (LC): 3,407 species
- Data deficient (DD): 789 species
Mammalian species (IUCN, 2026.1)
- 6,054 extant species have been evaluated
- 5,328 of those are fully assessed (Note: excludes data deficient evaluations.)
- 4,682 are not threatened at present (Note: NT and LC.)
- 1,372 to 2,179 are threatened (Note: Threatened comprises CR, EN and VU. Upper estimate additionally includes DD.)
- 97 to 126 are extinct or extinct in the wild:
  - 96 extinct (EX) species (Note: Chart omits extinct (EX) species)
  - 1 extinct in the wild (EW)
  - 29 possibly extinct [CR(PE)]
  - 0 possibly extinct in the wild [CR(PEW)]

Endangered (EN) species are considered to be facing a very high risk of extinction in the wild.

As of July 2026, the International Union for Conservation of Nature (IUCN) lists 565 endangered mammalian species. Of all evaluated mammalian species, 9.3% are listed as endangered. The IUCN also lists 86 mammalian subspecies as endangered.

Of the subpopulations of mammals evaluated by the IUCN, five species subpopulations have been assessed as endangered.

For a species to be considered endangered by the IUCN it must meet certain quantitative criteria which are designed to classify taxa facing "a very high risk of extinction". An even higher risk is faced by critically endangered species, which meet the quantitative criteria for endangered species. Critically endangered mammals are listed separately. There are 679 mammalian species which are endangered or critically endangered.

Additionally 789 mammalian species (13% of those evaluated) are listed as data deficient, meaning there is insufficient information for a full assessment of conservation status. As these species typically have small distributions and/or populations, they are intrinsically likely to be threatened, according to the IUCN. While the category of data deficient indicates that no assessment of extinction risk has been made for the taxa, the IUCN notes that it may be appropriate to give them "the same degree of attention as threatened taxa, at least until their status can be assessed."

This is a complete list of endangered mammalian species and subspecies evaluated by the IUCN. Species and subspecies which have endangered subpopulations (or stocks) are indicated. Where possible common names for taxa are given while links point to the scientific name used by the IUCN.

== Odd-toed ungulates ==
Species

- Wild horse
- Grévy's zebra
- Baird's tapir
- Malayan tapir
- Mountain tapir

Subspecies

- Przewalski's horse
- Turkmenian kulan

== Primates ==
There are 146 species and 56 subspecies of primate assessed as endangered.

=== Gibbons ===
Species

- Western hoolock gibbon
- Agile gibbon
- Bornean white-bearded gibbon
- Kloss's gibbon
- Lar gibbon
- Silvery gibbon
- Müller's Bornean gibbon
- Pileated gibbon
- Yellow-cheeked gibbon
- Siamang

Subspecies

- Carpenter's lar
- Malaysian lar
- Sumatran lar gibbon
- Abbott's gray gibbon
- Northern gray gibbon
- Muller's gray gibbon

=== Great apes ===
Species

- Bonobo
- Chimpanzee

Subspecies

- Mountain gorilla
- Nigeria-Cameroon chimpanzee
- Eastern chimpanzee
- Central chimpanzee

=== Lemurs ===
There are 45 species and one subspecies of lemur assessed as endangered.

==== Indriids ====
- Betsileo woolly lemur
- Southern woolly lemur
- Moore's woolly lemur
- Sambirano woolly lemur
- Milne-Edwards' sifaka

==== Daubentoniidae species ====
- Aye-aye

==== Sportive lemurs ====
- Red-shouldered sportive lemur
- Ankarana sportive lemur
- Betsileo sportive lemur
- Gray-backed sportive lemur
- Milne-Edwards' sportive lemur
- Hubbard's sportive lemur
- White-footed sportive lemur
- Small-toothed sportive lemur
- Daraina sportive lemur
- Otto's sportive lemur
- Petter's sportive lemur
- Randrianasolo's sportive lemur
- Scott's sportive lemur
- Wright's sportive lemur

==== Lemurids ====
Species

- Collared brown lemur
- Crowned lemur
- Sanford's brown lemur
- Ring-tailed lemur

Subspecies

- Gilbert's bamboo lemur

==== Cheirogaleids ====
- MacArthur's mouse lemur
- Margot Marsh's mouse lemur
- Mittermeier's mouse lemur
- Sambirano mouse lemur
- Simmons' mouse lemur
- Coquerel's giant mouse lemur
- Amber Mountain fork-marked lemur
- Masoala fork-marked lemur
- Pale fork-marked lemur
- Pariente's fork-marked lemur

=== Tarsiers ===
Species

- Niemitz's tarsier
- Peleng tarsier
- Pygmy tarsier
- Sangihe tarsier

Subspecies

- Tarsius bancanus bancanus
- Belitung Island tarsier

=== Old World monkeys ===
Species

- Preuss's monkey
- White-naped mangabey
- Sanje mangabey
- Collared mangabey
- Diana monkey
- White-throated guenon
- Moor macaque
- Arunachal macaque
- Southern pig-tailed macaque
- Siberut macaque
- Lion-tailed macaque
- Toque macaque
- Barbary macaque
- Drill
- Proboscis monkey
- Western red colobus
- Zanzibar red colobus
- Pennant's colobus
- Tana River red colobus
- Temminck's red colobus
- Ugandan red colobus
- Javan surili
- Sumatran surili
- Mentawai langur
- Black snub-nosed monkey
- Golden snub-nosed monkey
- Kashmir gray langur
- François' langur
- Gee's golden langur
- Germaine's lutung
- Hatinh langur
- Phayre's leaf monkey
- Laotian langur
- Shortridge's langur
- Purple-faced langur

Subspecies

- Bioko Preuss's monkey
- Cameroon Preuss's monkey
- Red-tailed moustached monkey
- White-throated guenon
- Golden guenon
- Prigogine's Angolan colobus
- Mt Uaraguess guereza
- Bioko black colobus
- Dusky toque macaque
- Highland toque macaque
- Dry zone toque macaque
- Mainland drill
- Bioko drill
- Nasalis larvatus larvatus
- Nasalis larvatus orientalis
- Miller's grizzled langur
- Crested grizzled langur
- Southern mitered langur
- Presbytis melalophos sumatranus
- Siberut langur
- Hubei golden snub-nosed monkey
- Quinling golden snub-nosed monkey
- Moupin golden snub-nosed monkey
- Grey langur (southern)
- Indochinese gray langur
- Trachypithecus phayrei phayrei
- Shan states langur
- Orange-bellied capped leaf monkey
- Blond-bellied langur
- Tenebrous capped langur
- Highland purple-faced langur
- Northern purple faced leaf monkey
- Southern purple faced langur

=== New World monkeys ===
Species

- Guatemalan black howler
- Maranhão red-handed howler
- Peruvian night monkey
- White-bellied spider monkey
- Peruvian spider monkey
- Geoffroy's spider monkey
- White-cheeked spider monkey
- Southern muriqui
- Coimbra Filho's titi
- Rio Beni titi
- Ollala brothers' titi
- Buffy-headed marmoset
- Buffy-tufted marmoset
- Santa Marta white-fronted capuchin
- Varied white-fronted capuchin
- White-nosed saki
- Black bearded saki
- Uta Hick's bearded saki
- Gray woolly monkey
- Silvery woolly monkey
- Superagüi lion tamarin
- Golden-headed lion tamarin
- Black lion tamarin
- Golden lion tamarin
- Pied tamarin
- White-footed tamarin
- Crested capuchin
- Central American squirrel monkey
- Black squirrel monkey

Subspecies

- Ornate spider monkey
- Yucatan spider monkey
- Gray woolly monkey
- Grey-crowned Central American squirrel monkey
- Black-crowned Central American squirrel monkey

=== Lorisoidea ===
Species

- Red slender loris
- Bengal slow loris
- Sunda slow loris
- Pygmy slow loris
- Rondo dwarf galago

Subspecies

- Bioko needle-clawed galago
- Galagoides zanzibaricus zanzibaricus
- Loris lydekkerianus grandis
- Northern Ceylonese slender loris
- Horton plains slender loris
- Loris tardigradus tardigradus
- Bioko squirrel galago

== Cetartiodactyls ==
Cetartiodactyla includes dolphins, whales and even-toed ungulates. There are 50 species, 14 subspecies, and four subpopulations of cetartiodactyl assessed as endangered.

=== Non-cetacean even-toed ungulates ===
There are 33 species and ten subspecies of non-cetacean even-toed ungulate assessed as endangered.

==== Musk deer species ====
- Anhui musk deer
- Dwarf musk deer
- Alpine musk deer
- Kashmir musk deer
- Black musk deer
- White-bellied musk deer

==== Cervids ====
- Calamian deer
- Indian hog deer
- Persian fallow deer
- South Andean deer
- Eld's deer
- Visayan spotted deer

==== Bovids ====
Species

- Arabian tahr
- Wild water buffalo
- Lowland anoa
- Mountain anoa
- West Caucasian tur
- Jentink's duiker
- Abbott's duiker
- Rhim gazelle
- Speke's gazelle
- Nile lechwe
- Nilgiri tahr
- Przewalski's gazelle
- Mountain nyala

Subspecies

- Lelwel hartebeest
- Swayne's hartebeest
- Rwenzori red duiker
- Coastal topi
- Western klipspringer
- Oryx beisa beisa
- Dwarf blue sheep
- Western mountain reedbuck
- Saiga tatarica mongolica

==== Other non-cetacean even-toed ungulates ====
Species

- Togian babirusa
- Chacoan peccary
- Pygmy hippopotamus
- Okapi
- Javan warty pig
- Philippine mouse-deer

Subspecies

- Masai giraffe
- Reticulated giraffe
- Bawean warty pig

=== Cetaceans ===
Species

- Sei whale
- Blue whale
- Hector's dolphin
- North Pacific right whale
- Perrin's beaked whale
- Irrawaddy dolphin
- South Asian river dolphin

Subspecies

- Black sea harbour porpoise
- Ganges river dolphin
- Indus river dolphin
- Black sea bottlenose dolphin

Subpopulations

- Bowhead whale (1 subpopulation)
- Short-beaked common dolphin (1 subpopulation)
- Humpback whale (2 subpopulations)
- Sperm whale (1 subpopulation)

== Marsupials ==
- Northern bettong
- Tate's triok
- Northern quoll
- Eastern quoll
- Goodfellow's tree-kangaroo
- Matschie's tree-kangaroo
- Dingiso
- Ifola tree-kangaroo
- David's echymipera
- Dibbler
- Giant bandicoot
- Southern greater glider
- Mahogany glider
- Nabarlek
- Proserpine rock-wallaby
- Gebe cuscus
- Woodlark cuscus
- Alexandria false antechinus
- Seram bandicoot
- Tasmanian devil
- Calaby's pademelon
- Mountain pademelon

== Carnivora ==
Species

- Red panda
- Galápagos fur seal
- Antarctic fur seal
- Ethiopian wolf
- Bay cat
- Owston's palm civet
- Dhole
- Otter civet
- Sea otter
- Western falanouc
- Hooded seal
- Grandidier's mongoose
- Andean mountain cat
- Marine otter
- Southern river otter
- Hairy-nosed otter
- Darwin's fox
- African wild dog
- Bornean ferret-badger
- Narrow-striped mongoose
- Black-footed ferret
- Eastern mountain coati
- Australian sea lion
- Tiger
- New Zealand sea lion
- Flat-headed cat
- Giant otter
- Caspian seal
- Large-spotted civet
- Galápagos sea lion

Subspecies

- Western Steller sea lion
- Central American oncilla
- Sumatran clouded leopard
- Asiatic lion
- Siberian tiger
- Indochinese tiger
- Bengal tiger
- Ungava seal
- Saimaa ringed seal

== Afrosoricida ==
Includes tenrecs and golden moles.

- Marley's golden mole
- Giant golden mole
- Van Zyl's golden mole
- Jenkins' shrew tenrec
- Northern shrew tenrec
- Gunning's golden mole
- Juliana's golden mole

== Eulipotyphla ==
There are 43 species in the order Eulipotyphla assessed as endangered.

=== Shrews ===
- Bornean water shrew
- Ansell's shrew
- Bailey's shrew
- Bale shrew
- Canarian shrew
- Desperate shrew
- Sri Lankan rain forest shrew
- Kivu long-haired shrew
- Nyiro shrew
- Sri Lankan long-tailed shrew
- Negros shrew
- Ryukyu shrew
- Guramba shrew
- Cameroonian shrew
- Rainey's shrew
- Kahuzi swamp shrew
- Tanzanian shrew
- Tarella shrew
- Telford's shrew
- São Tomé shrew
- Usambara shrew
- Enders's small-eared shrew
- Guatemalan broad-clawed shrew
- Darién small-eared shrew
- Kelaart's long-clawed shrew
- Montane mouse shrew
- Geata mouse shrew
- Nyika burrowing shrew
- Kihaule's mouse shrew
- Long-tailed forest shrew
- Oku mouse shrew
- Rumpi mouse shrew
- Thin mouse shrew
- Pearson's long-clawed shrew
- Pribilof Island shrew
- Day's shrew
- Sri Lankan shrew
- Flores shrew
- Ceylon jungle shrew
- Howell's forest shrew
- Bioko forest shrew
- Mount Cameroon forest shrew

=== Other Eulipotyphla species ===
- Echigo mole
- Hainan gymnure
- Dinagat gymnure
- Cuban solenodon

== Lagomorpha ==
Rabbits and relatives

- Hispid hare
- Tehuantepec jackrabbit
- Hainan hare
- Annamite striped rabbit
- Hoffmann's pika
- Ili pika
- Koslov's pika
- Amami rabbit
- Volcano rabbit
- Tapeti
- Tres Marias rabbit

== Rodents ==
There are 146 species and one subspecies of rodent assessed as endangered.

=== Hystricomorpha ===
("Porcupine-like")

- Painted tree-rat
- Short-tailed chinchilla
- Long-tailed chinchilla
- Southern tuco-tuco
- Berg's tuco-tuco
- Bonetto's tuco-tuco
- Tuco-tuco of the dunes
- Mottled tuco-tuco
- Furtive tuco-tuco
- Pilar tuco-tuco
- Plebiscite tuco-tuco
- Pundt's tuco-tuco
- Rio Negro tuco-tuco
- Ruatan Island agouti
- Jamaican coney
- Eared hutia
- Orange-brown Atlantic tree-rat
- Lund's Atlantic tree-rat
- Giant Atlantic tree-rat
- Moojen's Atlantic spiny rat
- Yonenaga's Atlantic spiny rat

=== Myomorpha ===
There are 105 species in Myomorpha assessed as endangered.

==== Murids ====
Includes mice, rats, gerbils, and relatives.

- Dinagat hairy-tailed rat
- Heavenly hill rat
- Long-headed hill rat
- Panay cloudrunner
- Giant bushy-tailed cloud rat
- Montane shaggy rat
- Yalden's rat
- Ryukyu long-tailed giant rat
- Sulawesi spiny rat
- Western gerbil
- Giant thicket rat
- Manipur bush rat
- Marmoset rat
- Eisentraut's striped mouse
- Father Basilio's striped mouse
- Baer's wood mouse
- Mount Oku hylomyscus
- Sody's tree rat
- Mount Oku rat
- Dieterlen's brush-furred mouse
- Eisentraut's brush-furred rat
- Rahm's brush-furred rat
- Alpine woolly rat
- Pagai spiny rat
- Watts's spiny rat
- Dusky mosaic-tailed rat
- Bannister's rat
- Short-tailed Talaud mosaic-tailed rat
- Manusela mosaic-tailed rat
- Manus Island mosaic-tailed rat
- Long-tailed Talaud mosaic-tailed rat
- Kondana soft-furred rat
- Servant mouse
- Ceylon spiny mouse
- Bunn's short-tailed bandicoot rat
- Ceram rat
- Northern hopping mouse
- Barbour's vlei rat
- Burton's vlei rat
- Northern water rat
- Gressitt's mosaic-tailed rat
- Flores long-nosed rat
- D'Entrecasteaux Archipelago tree mouse
- Hartwig's soft-furred mouse
- Cameroon soft-furred mouse
- Gotel Mountain soft-furred mouse
- Nonsense rat
- Hainald's rat
- Mentawai rat
- Nillu rat
- Kerala rat
- Simalur rat
- Van Deusen's rat
- Bougainville naked-tailed rat
- Isabel naked-tailed rat
- Bartels's rat
- Ryukyu spiny rat
- Tokunoshima spiny rat
- King rat
- Nilgiri long-tailed tree mouse
- Nolthenius's long-tailed climbing mouse

==== Cricetids ====
Includes true hamsters, voles, lemmings, and New World rats and mice.

- Aquatic rat
- Monster rice rat
- Jico deer mouse
- Striped rice rat
- Fossorial giant rat
- Oaxaca giant deer mouse
- Nelson's giant deer mouse
- Thomas's giant deer mouse
- Golden hamster
- Transitional colilargo
- Kerman vole
- Tarabundí vole
- Zempoaltépec vole
- Hammond's rice rat
- Goldman's diminutive woodrat
- Ecuadorian grass mouse
- Tamaulipan woodrat
- Bryant's woodrat
- Musso's fish-eating rat
- Gorgas's rice rat
- Quechuan hocicudo
- Cook's hocicudo
- Tres Marias island mouse
- Zempoaltepec deer mouse
- Black-tailed mouse
- El Carrizo deer mouse
- Santa Cruz mouse
- Winkelmann's mouse
- Rio de Janeiro arboreal rat
- Definitive leaf-eared mouse
- Guerrero harvest mouse
- Salt marsh harvest mouse
- Narrow-nosed harvest mouse
- Mexican water mouse
- Miahuatlán cotton rat
- Woodland Oldfield mouse
- Unicolored Oldfield mouse
- Greater Wilfred's mouse
- Magdalena rat

==== Nesomyids ====
- Hairy-tailed tree rat
- White-tipped tufted-tailed rat
- Petter's tuft-tailed rat
- Malagasy giant rat
- Greater big-footed mouse
- White-tailed rat
- Western nesomys
- Eastern voalavo

==== Spalacids ====
- Sandy mole-rat
- Big-headed mole-rat
- Podolsk mole-rat

==== Dipodids ====
- Armenian birch mouse
- Kazbeg birch mouse

=== Castorimorpha ===
("Beaver-like")

- Giant kangaroo rat
- Stephens' kangaroo rat
- Tropical pocket gopher
- Nelson's spiny pocket mouse
- Paraguaná spiny pocket mouse
- Jaliscan spiny pocket mouse
- White-eared pocket mouse
- Michoacan pocket gopher

=== Sciuromorpha ===
("Squirrel-like")

Species

- San Joaquin antelope squirrel
- Mexican prairie dog
- Utah prairie dog
- Woolly flying squirrel
- Sipora flying squirrel
- Mentawi flying squirrel
- Tarbagan marmot
- Palmer's chipmunk
- Vincent's bush squirrel
- Smoky flying squirrel
- European ground squirrel
- Fraternal squirrel
- Mearns's squirrel
- Idaho ground squirrel
- Perote ground squirrel

Subspecies

- Baja California rock squirrel

== Bats ==
There are 89 bat species assessed as endangered.

=== Megabats ===
- Talaud flying fox
- Giant golden-crowned flying fox
- Salim Ali's fruit bat
- São Tomé collared fruit bat
- Small-toothed fruit bat
- Philippine tube-nosed fruit bat
- Bougainville monkey-faced bat
- Guadalcanal monkey-faced bat
- Banks flying fox
- Livingstone's fruit bat
- Mariana fruit bat
- Black-bearded flying fox
- Temotu flying fox
- Bonin flying fox
- Rennell flying fox
- Rodrigues flying fox
- Vanikoro flying fox
- Large flying fox
- Mindoro stripe-faced fruit bat

=== Microbats ===
- Fijian mastiff bat
- São Tomé free-tailed bat
- New Caledonia wattled bat
- Guadeloupe big-eyed bat
- Pacific sheath-tailed bat
- Guadeloupe big brown bat
- Japanese short-tailed bat
- Cox's roundleaf bat
- Lesser great leaf-nosed bat
- Tanzanian woolly bat
- St. Aignan's trumpet-eared bat
- Greater long-nosed bat
- Bokermann's nectar bat
- Dekeyser's nectar bat
- Fernandez's sword-nosed bat
- Southeast Asian long-fingered bat
- Loyalty bent-winged bat
- Equatorial dog-faced bat
- Natal free-tailed bat
- Ryukyu tube-nosed bat
- Atacama myotis
- Findley's myotis
- Peninsular myotis
- Flat-headed myotis
- Frosted myotis
- Isalo serotine
- Rosevear's serotine
- Endo's pipistrelle
- Paraguana moustached bat
- Rhinolophus belligerator
- Andaman horseshoe bat
- Hill's horseshoe bat
- Maclaud's horseshoe bat
- Timorese horseshoe bat
- Rhinolophus proconsulis
- Ziama horseshoe bat
- Yemeni mouse-tailed bat
- Genoways's yellow bat
- Antioquian sac-winged bat
- Lesser yellow-shouldered bat
- Blunt-eared bat
- Guinean horseshoe bat

== Other mammals ==
Species

- African bush elephant (Loxodonta africana)
- Asian elephant (Elephas maximus)
- Indian pangolin (Manis crassicaudata)
- White-bellied pangolin (Phataginus tricuspis)
- Golden-rumped sengi (Rhynchocyon chrysopygus)
- Giant pangolin (Smutsia gigantea)
- Nicobar treeshrew (Tupaia nicobarica)
- Maned sloth (Bradypus torquatus)

Subspecies

- Borneo elephant (Elephas maximus borneensis)
- Indian elephant (Elephas maximus indicus)
- Sri Lankan elephant (Elephas maximus maximus)
- Florida manatee (Trichechus manatus latirostris)
- Antillean manatee (Trichechus manatus manatus)

== See also ==
- Lists of IUCN Red List endangered species
- List of least concern mammals
- List of near threatened mammals
- List of vulnerable mammals
- List of critically endangered mammals
- List of recently extinct mammals
- List of data deficient mammals
