= Schmidly's deer mouse =

Schmidly's deer mouse may refer to:

- Peromyscus schmidlyi, occurs in Durango, Sinaloa and Sonora, Mexico. Split from Peromyscus boylii in 2004.
- Habromys schmidlyi, a critically endangered species which occurs on the Guerrero/Mexico state border. Described in 2005.
