= List of near threatened mammals =

- Extinct in the wild (EW): 1 species
- Critically endangered (CR): 236 species
- Endangered (EN): 565 species
- Vulnerable (VU): 571 species
- Near threatened (NT): 405 species
- Least concern (LC): 3,407 species
- Data deficient (DD): 789 species
Mammalian species (IUCN, 2026.1)
- 6,054 extant species have been evaluated
- 5,328 of those are fully assessed (Note: excludes data deficient evaluations.)
- 4,682 are not threatened at present (Note: NT and LC.)
- 1,372 to 2,179 are threatened (Note: Threatened comprises CR, EN and VU. Upper estimate additionally includes DD.)
- 97 to 126 are extinct or extinct in the wild:
  - 96 extinct (EX) species (Note: Chart omits extinct (EX) species)
  - 1 extinct in the wild (EW)
  - 29 possibly extinct [CR(PE)]
  - 0 possibly extinct in the wild [CR(PEW)]

Near threatened (NT) species do not currently qualify for critically endangered (CR), endangered (EN) or vulnerable (VU) statuses, but are likely to qualify for a threatened category in the near future, or already close to qualifying.

In September 2016, the International Union for Conservation of Nature (IUCN) listed 343 near threatened mammalian species. Of all evaluated mammalian species, 6.2% are listed as near threatened. The IUCN also lists 31 mammalian subspecies as near threatened.

Of the subpopulations of mammals evaluated by the IUCN, one species subpopulation and one subspecies subpopulation have been assessed as near threatened.

This is a complete list of near threatened mammalian species and subspecies evaluated by the IUCN. Species and subspecies which have near threatened subpopulations (or stocks) are indicated. Where possible common names for taxa are given while links point to the scientific name used by the IUCN.

== Odd-toed ungulates ==
Species

- White rhinoceros
- Onager
- Plains zebra

Subspecies

- Mongolian wild ass

== Primates ==
Species

- Sun-tailed monkey
- Calabar potto
- Black-fronted titi
- Shock-headed capuchin
- Northern needle-clawed bushbaby
- Angolan dwarf galago
- Gray slender loris
- Assam macaque
- Tibetan macaque
- Black-tailed marmoset
- Goodman's mouse lemur
- Guinea baboon
- Zanzibar bushbaby
- White-thighed surili
- Golden-mantled tamarin
- Bare-eared squirrel monkey
- Black capuchin
- Bioko Allen's bushbaby
- Tarai gray langur
- Tufted gray langur
- Philippine tarsier
- Campbell's mona monkey
- Mona monkey
- West African potto

Subspecies

- Feline night monkey
- Lomami river blue monkey
- Lomami river wolf's monkey
- Congo Basin Wolf's monkey
- Cordier's Angolan colobus
- Northern black crested mangabey
- Mysore slender loris
- Malabar slender loris
- Macaca assamensis assamensis
- Macaca assamensis pelops
- Philippine long-tailed macaque
- Robinson's banded langur
- Yellow-handed mitered langur
- Lyon's pale-thighed langur
- Chasen's pale-thighed langur
- Malayan pale-thighed langur
- Graell's black-mantle tamarin
- Colombian squirrel monkey
- Cross River bushbaby
- Madras gray langur
- Trachypithecus cristatus cristatus

== Cetartiodactyls ==
Cetartiodactyla includes dolphins, whales and even-toed ungulates. There are 31 species, eight subspecies, one subpopulations of species, and one subpopulations of subspecies of cetartiodactyl assessed as near threatened.

=== Non-cetacean even-toed ungulates ===
There are 26 species and eight subspecies of non-cetacean even-toed ungulate assessed as near threatened.

==== Suids ====
Species

- Palawan bearded pig
- Celebes warty pig

==== Cervids ====
- Tufted deer
- Bornean yellow muntjac
- Pampas deer
- Southern pudú

Subspecies

- Alaska moose

==== Bovids ====
Species

- American bison
- Eastern tur
- Markhor
- Himalayan serow
- Bay duiker
- White-bellied duiker
- Yellow-backed duiker
- Himalayan tahr
- Puku
- Gerenuk
- Himalayan goral
- Argali
- Tibetan antelope
- Goa
- Saiga
- African buffalo
- Bongo
- Lesser kudu

Subspecies

- Western hartebeest
- Cephalophus ogilbyi crusalbum
- Damaliscus pygargus pygargus
- Defassa waterbuck
- Lowland bongo

=== Cetaceans ===
Species

- Antarctic minke whale
- Chilean dolphin
- Stejneger's beaked whale

Subpopulations of species

- Bowhead whale (1 subpopulation)

Subpopulations of subspecies

- Northern blue whale (1 subpopulation)

== Marsupials ==
There are 42 marsupial species assessed as near threatened.

=== Diprotodontia ===
- Eastern bettong
- Boodie
- Bennett's tree-kangaroo
- Lumholtz's tree-kangaroo
- Small dorcopsis
- Lemur-like ringtail possum
- Black wallaroo
- Monjon
- Godman's rock-wallaby
- Mareeba rock-wallaby
- Purple-necked rock-wallaby
- Yellow-footed rock-wallaby
- Long-nosed potoroo
- Carpentarian false antechinus
- D'Albertis' ringtail possum
- Plush-coated ringtail possum
- Cinereus ringtail possum
- Admiralty Island cuscus
- Scaly-tailed possum

=== Shrew opossums ===
- Gray-bellied caenolestid
- Long-nosed caenolestid

=== Microbiotheria ===
- Pancho's monito del monte
- Southern monito del monte

=== Dasyuromorphia ===
Includes most of the Australian carnivorous marsupials.

- New Guinean quoll
- Western quoll
- Bronze quoll
- Broad-striped dasyure
- Numbat
- Red-tailed phascogale
- Brush-tailed phascogale
- Kakadu dunnart
- Julia Creek dunnart

=== Opossums ===
- Chacoan pygmy opossum
- Thylamys fenestrae
- Paraguayan fat-tailed mouse opossum
- Dwarf fat-tailed mouse opossum

== Carnivora ==
Species

- African clawless otter
- Congo clawless otter
- Short-eared dog
- Olinguito
- Jackson's mongoose
- Maned wolf
- Steller sea lion
- Harp seal
- Johnston's genet
- Aquatic genet
- Banded palm civet
- Bearded seal
- Jaguarundi
- Short-tailed mongoose
- Collared mongoose
- Striped hyena
- Spotted-necked otter
- Colocolo
- Margay
- Neotropical otter
- European otter
- Sechuran fox
- Mountain weasel
- Japanese weasel
- Western mountain coati
- Jaguar
- Brown hyena
- Marbled cat
- Rusty-spotted cat
- Bush dog
- Island fox

Subspecies

- Atlantic walrus

== Afrosoricida ==
Includes tenrecs and golden moles.

- Fynbos golden mole
- Highveld golden mole

== Eulipotyphla ==
- Asiatic short-tailed shrew
- Malayan water shrew
- Smith's shrew
- Glass's shrew
- Kivu shrew
- MacMillan's shrew
- Nimba shrew
- Sokolov's shrew
- European hedgehog
- Sado mole
- Alpine shrew
- Moon forest shrew

== Lagomorpha ==
Rabbits and relatives

- Yarkand hare
- European rabbit
- Appalachian cottontail

== Rodents ==
There are 106 rodent species assessed as near threatened.

=== Hystricomorpha ===
("Porcupine-like")

- Argentine tuco-tuco
- D'Orbigny's tuco-tuco
- Emily's tuco-tuco
- Pearson's tuco-tuco
- Porteous's tuco-tuco
- Mountain paca
- Coiban agouti
- Orinoco agouti
- Patagonian mara
- Ansell's mole-rat
- Shipton's mountain cavy
- Prehensile-tailed hutia
- Moon-toothed degu
- Pacific spiny rat
- Elias' Atlantic spiny rat
- Plains viscacha rat

=== Myomorpha ===
There are 63 species in Myomorpha assessed as near threatened.

==== Murids ====
Includes mice, rats, gerbils, and relatives.

- Caucasus field mouse
- Blick's grass rat
- Luzon hairy-tailed rat
- Inland hill rat
- Isarog striped shrew-rat
- Mindoro striped rat
- Central Sulawesi spiny rat
- Forest thicket rat
- Minahassa Ranee mouse
- Delacour's marmoset rat
- Greater stick-nest rat
- Short-tailed brush-furred rat
- Elegant margareta rat
- Broad-toothed mouse
- Oldfield white-bellied rat
- Fawn hopping mouse
- Dusky hopping mouse
- Flores giant rat
- Paucidentomys vermidax
- Lowland brush mouse
- Muton's soft-furred mouse
- Heath mouse
- Sula rat
- Spiny Ceram rat
- Japen rat
- Mount Data shrew rat
- Masked white-tailed rat
- Bismarck giant rat

==== Cricetids ====
Includes true hamsters, voles, lemmings, and New World rats and mice.

- Gray akodont
- Sanborn's grass mouse
- Cochabamba grass mouse
- Royle's mountain vole
- Red tree vole
- California red tree mouse
- Southwestern water vole
- Torres's crimson-nosed rat
- Large long-clawed mouse
- Ward's red-backed vole
- Crested-tailed deer mouse
- Cloud forest rice rat
- Large-headed rice rat
- Sowbug rice rat
- True's vole
- Pittier's crab-eating rat
- Yellow isthmus rat
- Cleft-headed juliomys
- Turkish hamster
- Romanian hamster
- Cabrera's vole
- Guatemalan vole
- Taiwan vole
- Jalapan pine vole
- Sakhalin vole
- Schelkovnikov's pine vole
- Dark bolo mouse
- Diminutive woodrat
- Allegheny woodrat
- Sonoran woodrat
- Big deer mouse
- Chihuahuan mouse
- Florida mouse
- Buenos Aires leaf-eared mouse
- Long-clawed mole vole
- Eastern puna mouse
- Brazilian arboreal mouse
- Thomas's water mouse
- Slender Oldfield mouse
- Szechuan vole

==== Sminthids ====
- Caucasian birch mouse

=== Castorimorpha ===
("Beaver-like")

- Goldman's pocket mouse
- Banner-tailed kangaroo rat
- Desert pocket gopher

=== Sciuromorpha ===
There are 25 species in Sciuromorpha assessed as near threatened.

==== Sciurids ====
Squirrels, chipmunks, marmots, susliks and prairie dogs

- Ear-spot squirrel
- Anderson's squirrel
- Sierra Madre ground squirrel
- Palawan flying squirrel
- Mentawai three-striped squirrel
- Swynnerton's bush squirrel
- Bhutan giant flying squirrel
- Cream-coloured giant squirrel
- Black giant squirrel
- Grizzled giant squirrel
- Shrew-faced squirrel
- Richmond's squirrel
- Asia Minor ground squirrel
- Horse-tailed squirrel
- Culion tree squirrel
- Bangs's mountain squirrel
- Complex-toothed flying squirrel
- Washington ground squirrel
- Mohave ground squirrel

==== Dormice ====
- Garden dormouse

== Cingulata ==
- Chacoan naked-tailed armadillo
- Southern long-nosed armadillo
- Llanos long-nosed armadillo
- Southern three-banded armadillo
- Pichi

== Bats ==
There are 79 bat species assessed as near threatened.

=== Megabats ===
- Panniet naked-backed fruit bat
- Dayak fruit bat
- Straw-coloured fruit bat
- Angolan epauletted fruit bat
- Little golden-mantled flying fox
- Solomons flying fox
- Samoa flying fox
- Pohle's fruit bat
- Sulawesi stripe-faced fruit bat

=== Microbats ===
There are 63 microbat species assessed as near threatened.

==== Old World leaf-nosed bats ====
- Borneo roundleaf bat
- Jones's roundleaf bat
- Large Asian roundleaf bat
- Peleng leaf-nosed bat
- Commerson's roundleaf bat
- Striped leaf-nosed bat

==== Horseshoe bats ====
- Decken's horseshoe bat
- Mediterranean horseshoe bat
- Peninsular horseshoe bat
- Large rufous horseshoe bat
- Lesser wooly horseshoe bat

==== Vesper bats ====
- Barbastelle
- Van Gelder's bat
- Little pied bat
- Mexican big-eared bat
- Harmless serotine
- Western false pipistrelle
- Small woolly bat
- Least woolly bat
- Clear-winged woolly bat
- Pfeiffer's red bat
- Taiwan tube-nosed bat
- Bechstein's bat
- Far Eastern myotis
- Pond bat
- Schwartz's myotis
- Ridley's bat
- Red myotis
- Indiana bat
- Dark-brown serotine
- Birdlike noctule
- Cuban evening bat
- Groove-toothed bat
- Taiwan big-eared bat

==== Leaf-nosed bats ====
- Mexican long-tongued bat
- Honduran white bat
- Lesser long-nosed bat
- Western nectar bat
- Long-snouted bat
- Platyrrhinus ismaeli
- Matapalo broad-nosed bat
- Hairy little fruit bat
- Red fruit bat
- Talamancan yellow-shouldered bat
- Spectral bat

==== Other microbat species ====
- Bahaman funnel-eared bat
- Malayan free-tailed bat
- Peterson's free-tailed bat
- Brazilian funnel-eared bat
- Hispaniolan greater funnel-eared bat
- Malayan slit-faced bat
- Large-eared free-tailed bat
- Coastal sheath-tailed bat

== Other mammal species ==
- Eastern tree hyrax
- Platypus

== See also ==
- Lists of IUCN Red List near threatened species
- List of least concern mammals
- List of vulnerable mammals
- List of endangered mammals
- List of critically endangered mammals
- List of recently extinct mammals
- List of data deficient mammals
