= List of vulnerable mammals =

- Extinct in the wild (EW): 1 species
- Critically endangered (CR): 236 species
- Endangered (EN): 565 species
- Vulnerable (VU): 571 species
- Near threatened (NT): 405 species
- Least concern (LC): 3,407 species
- Data deficient (DD): 789 species
Mammalian species (IUCN, 2026.1)
- 6,054 extant species have been evaluated
- 5,328 of those are fully assessed (Note: excludes data deficient evaluations.)
- 4,682 are not threatened at present (Note: NT and LC.)
- 1,372 to 2,179 are threatened (Note: Threatened comprises CR, EN and VU. Upper estimate additionally includes DD.)
- 97 to 126 are extinct or extinct in the wild:
  - 96 extinct (EX) species (Note: Chart omits extinct (EX) species)
  - 1 extinct in the wild (EW)
  - 29 possibly extinct [CR(PE)]
  - 0 possibly extinct in the wild [CR(PEW)]

Vulnerable (VU) species are considered to be facing a high risk of extinction in the wild.

In September 2016, the International Union for Conservation of Nature (IUCN) listed 529 vulnerable mammalian species. Of all evaluated mammalian species, 9.6% are listed as vulnerable. The IUCN also lists 53 mammalian subspecies as vulnerable.

Of the subpopulations of mammals evaluated by the IUCN, five species subpopulations and one subspecies subpopulation have been assessed as vulnerable.

For a species to be assessed as vulnerable to extinction the best available evidence must meet quantitative criteria set by the IUCN designed to reflect "a high risk of extinction in the wild". Endangered and critically endangered species also meet the quantitative criteria of vulnerable species, and are listed separately. See: List of endangered mammals, List of critically endangered mammals. Vulnerable, endangered and critically endangered species are collectively referred to as threatened species by the IUCN.

Additionally 783 mammalian species (14% of those evaluated) are listed as data deficient, meaning there is insufficient information for a full assessment of conservation status. As these species typically have small distributions and/or populations, they are intrinsically likely to be threatened, according to the IUCN. While the category of data deficient indicates that no assessment of extinction risk has been made for the taxa, the IUCN notes that it may be appropriate to give them "the same degree of attention as threatened taxa, at least until their status can be assessed".

This is a complete list of vulnerable mammalian species and subspecies evaluated by the IUCN. Species and subspecies which have vulnerable subpopulations (or stocks) are indicated. Where possible common names for taxa are given while links point to the scientific name used by the IUCN.

== Pangolins ==
- Long-tailed pangolin
- Ground pangolin

== Sirenia ==
- Dugong
- Amazonian manatee
- West Indian manatee
- African manatee

== Odd-toed ungulates ==
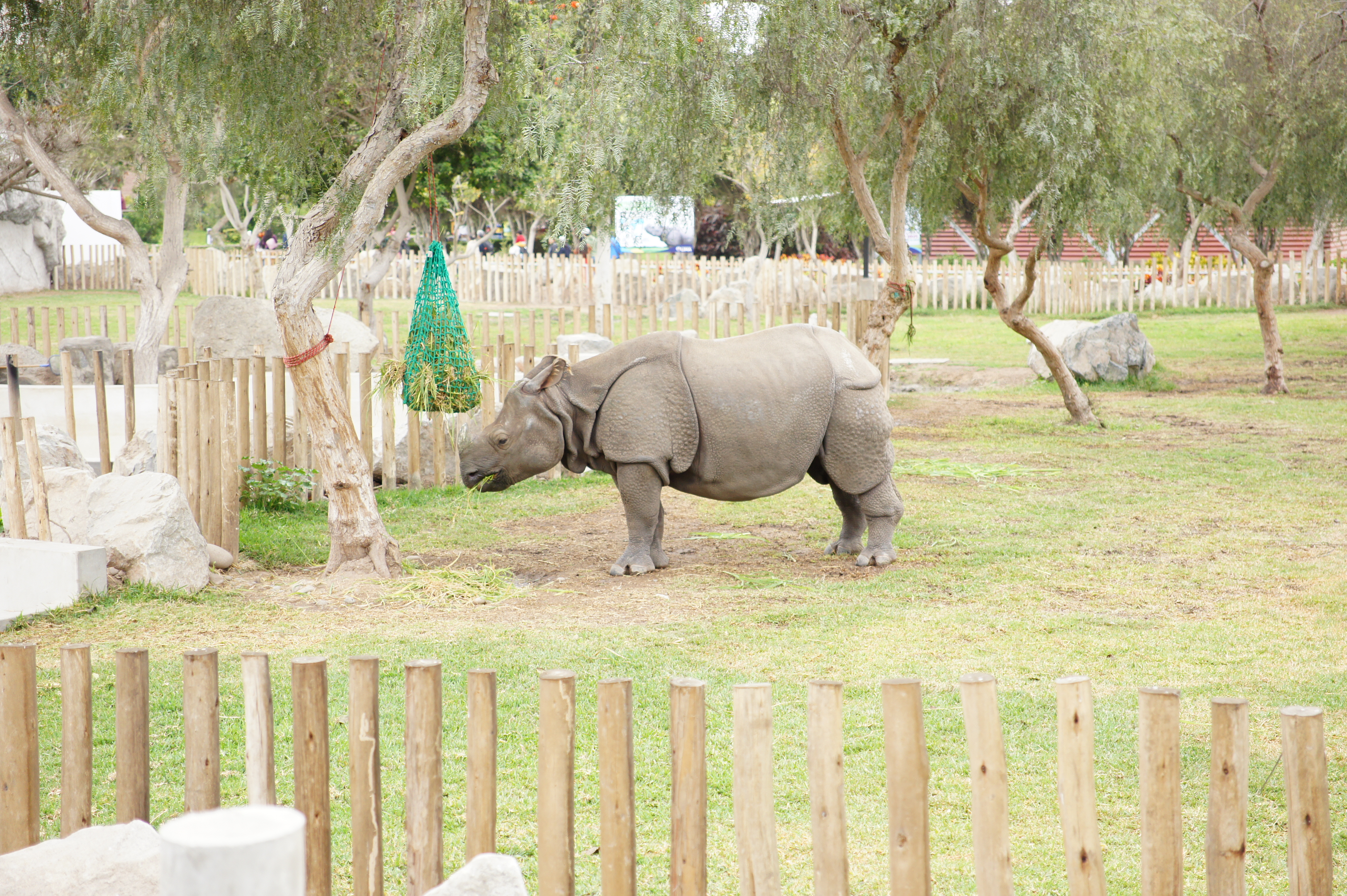
Indian rhinoceros

Species

- Mountain zebra
- Indian rhinoceros
- South American tapir

Subspecies

- Hartmann's mountain zebra
- Indian wild ass
- Cape mountain zebra

== Primates ==
There are 82 species and 33 subspecies of primate assessed as vulnerable.

=== Gibbons ===
Species

- Eastern hoolock gibbon

Subspecies

- Central lar

=== Lemurs ===
Species

- Eastern woolly lemur
- Western woolly lemur
- Peyrieras' woolly lemur
- Ramanantsoavana's woolly lemur
- Red-bellied lemur
- Red lemur
- Eastern lesser bamboo lemur
- Southern lesser bamboo lemur
- Western lesser bamboo lemur
- Seal's sportive lemur
- Pygmy mouse lemur
- Brown mouse lemur
- Northern rufous mouse lemur

Subspecies

- Grey lesser bamboo lemur
- Ranomafana bamboo lemur

==== Cheirogaleids ====
- Arnhold's mouse lemur
- Danfoss' mouse lemur
- Golden-brown mouse lemur
- Northern giant mouse lemur

=== Tarsiers ===
Species

- Horsfield's tarsier
- Dian's tarsier
- Spectral tarsier

Subspecies

- Bornean tarsier

=== Old World monkeys ===
Species

- L'hoest's monkey
- Red-eared guenon
- Hamlyn's monkey
- Lowe's mona monkey
- Bale Mountains vervet
- Black colobus
- Stump-tailed macaque
- Heck's macaque
- Northern pig-tailed macaque
- Gorontalo macaque
- Booted macaque
- Tonkean macaque
- Mandrill
- Udzungwa red colobus
- White-fronted surili
- Hose's langur
- Natuna Island surili
- Thomas's langur
- Javan lutung
- Nilgiri langur
- Capped langur

Subspecies

- Nigeria white-throated monkey
- Cameroon red-eared monkey
- Bioko red-eared monkey
- Pousargues's white-collared monkey
- Boutourlini's blue monkey
- Samango monkey
- Pluto monkey
- Golden-bellied crowned monkey
- Adolf Friedrichs's Angolan colobus
- Gabon black colobus
- Opdenbosch’s mangabey
- Con song long-tailed macaque
- Nicobar long-tailed macaque
- Muna-Buton macaque
- Macaca ochreata ochreata
- Raffles' banded langur
- Everett's grizzled langur
- Northern gelada
- Spangled ebony langur
- West Javan ebony langur
- St. Matthew Island dusky langur
- Koh Pennan dusky langur
- Perhentian Island dusky langur

=== New World monkeys ===
Species

- Red-handed howler
- Spix's red-handed howler
- Brumback's night monkey
- Gray-handed night monkey
- Brown howler
- Gray-bellied night monkey
- Red-faced spider monkey
- Bald uakari
- Neblina uakari
- Colombian black-handed titi
- Coastal black-handed titi
- Ornate titi
- Atlantic titi
- Goeldi's marmoset
- Western pygmy marmoset
- Brown woolly monkey
- Black-crowned dwarf marmoset
- White marmoset
- Rondon's marmoset
- White-footed saki
- Black tamarin

Subspecies

- Ecuadorian mantled howler
- Coiba Island howler monkey
- Nicaraguan spider monkey
- White bald-headed uacari
- Novaes' bald-headed uacari
- Red bald-headed uacari
- Red uacari
- Ayres black uakari
- Gorgona white-faced capuchin

=== Lorisoidea ===
- Borneo slow loris
- Kayan river slow loris
- Philippine slow loris
- Uluguru bushbaby

== Cetartiodactyls ==
Cetartiodactyla includes dolphins, whales and even-toed ungulates. There are 57 species, 12 subspecies, four subpopulations of species, and one subpopulations of subspecies of cetartiodactyl assessed as vulnerable.

=== Non-cetacean even-toed ungulates ===
There are 51 species and ten subspecies of non-cetacean even-toed ungulate assessed as vulnerable.

==== Suids ====
- Buru babirusa
- North Sulawesi babirusa
- Bornean bearded pig
- Oliver's warty pig
- Philippine warty pig

=== Giraffids ===
- Northern giraffe
- Southern giraffe

=== Cervids ===
- Marsh deer
- Thorold's deer
- Taruca
- Water deer
- Small red brocket
- Merida brocket
- Dwarf brocket
- Pygmy brocket
- Yucatan brown brocket
- Little red brocket
- Hairy-fronted muntjac
- Northern pudú
- Reindeer
- Barasingha
- Philippine deer
- Javan rusa
- Sambar deer

=== Bovids ===
Species

- Dibatag
- Barbary sheep
- Gaur
- Yak
- Takin
- Wild goat
- Nubian ibex
- Mainland serow
- Red serow
- Sumatran serow
- Zebra duiker
- Beira
- Red-fronted gazelle
- Eritrean gazelle
- Cuvier's gazelle
- Dorcas gazelle
- Mountain gazelle
- Arabian sand gazelle
- Goitered gazelle
- Red goral
- Long-tailed goral
- Chinese goral
- Soemmerring's gazelle
- Arabian oryx
- Mouflon
- Four-horned antelope

Subspecies

- Black-faced Impala
- Cephalophus ogilbyi brookei
- Cephalophus ogilbyi ogilbyi
- Damaliscus lunatus jimela
- Korrigum
- Buffon's kob
- Kafue lechwe
- Black lechwe
- Fringe-eared oryx
- Haggard's oribi
- Chanler's mountain reedbuck

=== Other non-cetacean even-toed ungulate species ===
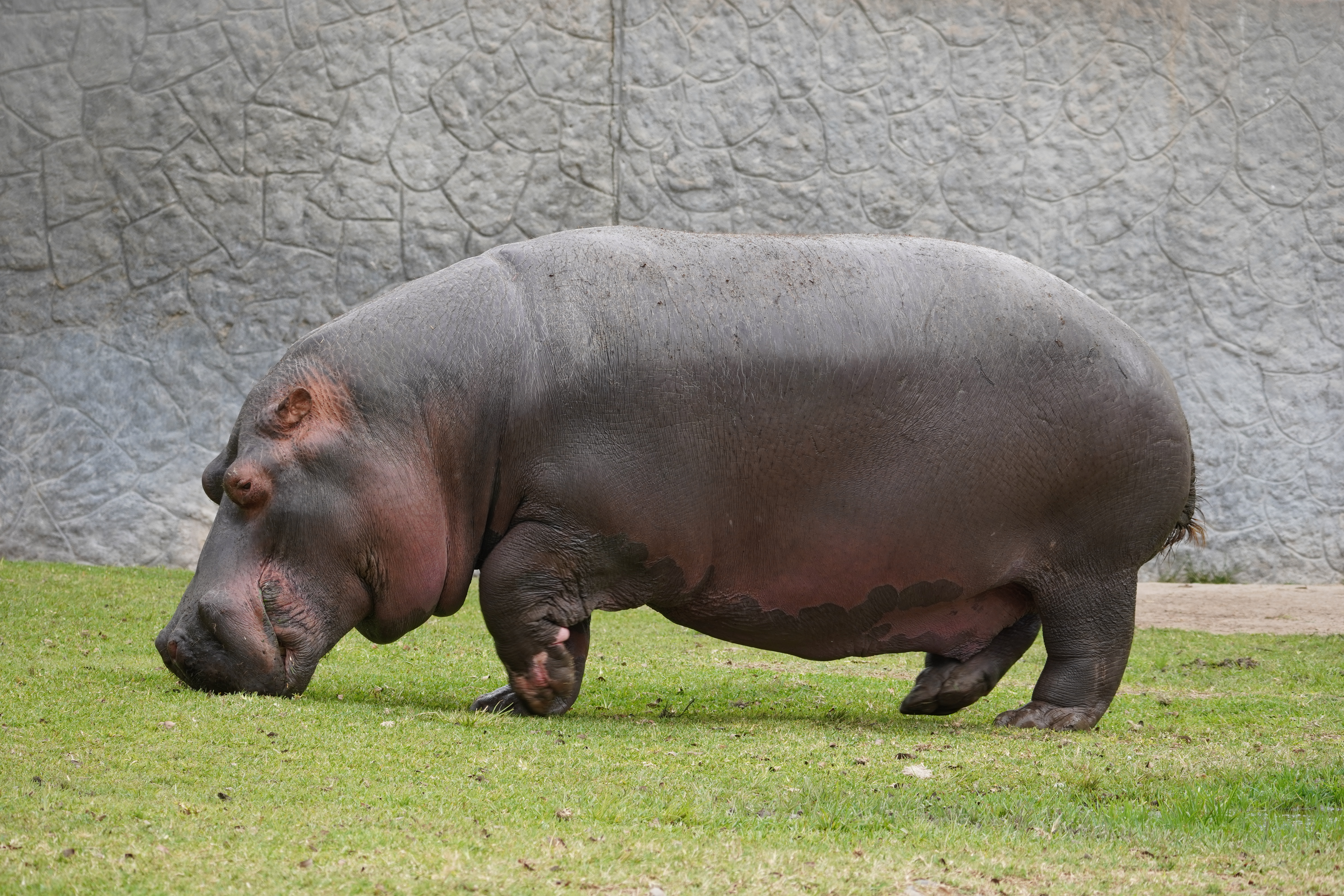
Hippopotamus

- Hippopotamus
- Siberian musk deer
- White-lipped peccary

=== Cetaceans ===
Species

- Fin whale
- Finless porpoise
- Sperm whale
- La Plata dolphin

Subspecies

- Black Sea common dolphin
- Eastern spinner dolphin

Subpopulations of species

- Fin whale (1 subpopulation)
- La Plata dolphin (1 subpopulation)
- Striped dolphin (1 subpopulation)
- Common bottlenose dolphin (1 subpopulation)

Subpopulations of subspecies

- Northern blue whale (1 subpopulation)

== Marsupials ==
There are 45 marsupial species assessed as vulnerable.

=== Peramelemorphia ===
- Greater bilby
- Arfak pygmy bandicoot
- Mouse bandicoot
- Western barred bandicoot
- Eastern barred bandicoot

=== Diprotodontia ===
There are 25 species in the order Diprotodontia assessed as vulnerable.

==== Potoroids ====
- Long-footed potoroo

==== Petaurids ====
- Yellow-bellied glider

==== Phascolarctids ====
- Koala

==== Macropodids ====
- Doria's tree-kangaroo
- Grizzled tree-kangaroo
- Lowlands tree-kangaroo
- Seri's tree-kangaroo
- Ursine tree-kangaroo
- Gray dorcopsis
- Rufous hare-wallaby
- Banded hare-wallaby
- Parma wallaby
- Bridled nail-tail wallaby
- Black-flanked rock-wallaby
- Brush-tailed rock-wallaby
- Mount Claro rock-wallaby
- Quokka
- Brown's pademelon
- Dusky pademelon

==== Phalangerids ====
- Sulawesi bear cuscus
- Blue-eyed cuscus
- Waigeou cuscus

==== Pseudocheirids ====
- Reclusive ringtail possum
- Vogelkop ringtail possum

=== Shrew opossums ===
- Andean caenolestid
- Northern caenolestid

=== Dasyuromorphia ===
Includes most of the Australian carnivorous marsupials

- Fawn antechinus
- Kowari
- Northern brush-tailed phascogale
- Carpentarian dunnart
- Sandhill dunnart

=== Opossums ===
- Little woolly mouse opossum
- Guajira mouse opossum
- Junin slender opossum
- Pantepui slender opossum
- Reig's opossum
- Karimi's fat-tailed mouse opossum

== Carnivora ==
Species

- Cheetah
- Giant panda
- Oriental small-clawed otter
- Binturong
- Hog badger
- Sokoke dog mongoose
- Northern fur seal
- African golden cat
- Asian golden cat
- Fossa
- Hawaiian monk seal
- Mediterranean monk seal
- Hose's palm civet
- Falanouc
- Chinese mountain cat
- Black-footed cat
- Malagasy civet
- Broad-striped Malagasy mongoose
- Bourlon's genet
- Crested servaline genet
- Sun bear
- Southern tigrina
- Oncilla
- Liberian mongoose
- Smooth-coated otter
- Sulawesi palm civet
- Nilgiri marten
- Sloth bear
- Colombian weasel
- Sunda clouded leopard
- Clouded leopard
- Snow leopard
- Walrus
- African leopard
- African lion
- Leighton's linsang
- Fishing cat
- Brown-tailed mongoose
- Eastern spotted skunk
- Pygmy spotted skunk
- Spectacled bear
- Polar bear
- Asian black bear
- Marbled polecat

Subspecies

- Dingo (Canis lupus dingo)
- East Siberian brown bear (Ursus arctos collaris)
- Bornean clouded leopard
- Ladoga ringed seal (Pusa hispida ladogensis)
- Sri Lankan leopard (Panthera pardus kotiya)
- Visayan leopard cat (Prionailurus bengalensis rabori)

Subpopulations

- South American fur seal (1 subpopulation)

== Afrosoricida ==
Includes tenrecs and golden moles

- Robust golden mole
- Arends's golden mole
- Duthie's golden mole
- Rough-haired golden mole
- Web-footed tenrec
- Dryad shrew tenrec
- Montane shrew tenrec
- Nasolo's shrew tenrec
- Nimba otter shrew

== Eulipotyphla ==
There are 29 species in the order Eulipotyphla assessed as vulnerable.

=== Shrews ===
- Eisentraut's shrew
- Andaman spiny shrew
- Lucina's shrew
- Manenguba shrew
- Mossy forest shrew
- Big Mexican small-eared shrew
- Phillips' small-eared shrew
- Wimmer's shrew
- Bururi forest shrew
- Kahuzi swamp shrew
- Sclater's mouse shrew
- Villa's gray shrew
- Ruwenzori shrew
- Large-toothed shrew
- Carmen Mountain shrew
- Cameroonian forest shrew

=== Erinaceids ===
- Dwarf gymnure

=== Talpids ===
- Senkaku mole

== Lagomorpha ==
Rabbits and relatives

- White-sided jackrabbit
- Broom hare
- Corsican hare
- Black jackrabbit
- Dice's cottontail
- New England cottontail

== Rodents ==
There are 140 species and one subspecies of rodent assessed as vulnerable.

=== Hystricomorpha ===
("Porcupine-like")

- Bristle-spined rat
- Lami tuco-tuco
- Mexican agouti
- Kafue mole-rat
- Philippine porcupine
- Black-tailed hutia
- Bridges' degu

=== Myomorpha ===
There are 105 species in Myomorpha assessed as vulnerable.

==== Murids ====
Includes mice, rats, gerbils, and relatives

- Camiguin forest mouse
- Mount Isarog shrew mouse
- Camiguin forest rat
- Fraternal hill rat
- Koopman's pencil-tailed tree mouse
- Brush-tailed rabbit rat
- Hoogstraal's gerbil
- Ethiopian thicket rat
- Lesser Ranee mouse
- Moon striped mouse
- Komodo rat
- Mentawai long-tailed giant rat
- Medium-tailed brush-furred rat
- Black-clawed brush-furred rat
- Beccari's margareta rat
- Fat-nosed spiny rat
- Rajah spiny rat
- Whitehead's spiny rat
- Buxton's jird
- Black-footed tree-rat
- Mayor's mouse
- Cameron Highlands white-bellied rat
- Western vlei rat
- Red tree rat
- Plains rat
- Kakadu pebble-mound mouse
- Shark Bay mouse
- Smoky mouse
- New Holland mouse
- Hastings River mouse
- Hoogerwerf's rat
- Little soft-furred rat
- Palm rat
- Glacier rat
- Sahyadris forest rat
- Andaman rat
- Isarog shrew rat
- Ohiya rat
- Spiny long-footed rat
- Kemp's thicket rat
- False water rat
- Arnhem Land rock rat

==== Cricetids ====
Includes true hamsters, voles, lemmings, and New World rats and mice

- Galapagos rice rat
- Reig's montane mouse
- Silent grass mouse
- Central Kashmir vole
- Balkan snow vole
- Beach vole
- Bolaños woodrat
- Fernandina Galapagos mouse
- Nesoryzomys narboroughi
- Santiago Galapagos mouse
- Venezuelan fish-eating rat
- Pearson's long-clawed mouse
- Nayarit mouse
- Chiapan deer mouse
- Roraima mouse
- Duke of Bedford's vole
- Puna mouse
- Hairy harvest mouse
- Unexpected cotton rat
- Thomasomys ucucha

==== Nesomyids ====
- Delany's mouse
- Lachaise's climbing mouse
- Nikolaus's mouse

==== Other Myomorpha species ====
- Malabar spiny dormouse
- Bukovina blind mole-rat

=== Castorimorpha ===
("Beaver-like") Species

- Texas kangaroo rat
- Fresno kangaroo rat
- Ecuadoran spiny pocket mouse

Subspecies

- Dalquest's pocket mouse

=== Sciuromorpha ===
There are 17 species in Sciuromorpha assessed as vulnerable.

==== Sciurids ====
Squirrels, chipmunks, marmots, susliks and prairie dogs

- Mentawai squirrel
- Layard's palm squirrel
- Dusky palm squirrel
- Lowland long-nosed squirrel
- Menzbier's marmot
- Buller's chipmunk
- Whiskered flying squirrel
- Siberut flying squirrel
- Temminck's flying squirrel
- Vordermann's flying squirrel
- Tufted ground squirrel
- Red-bellied squirrel
- Townsend's ground squirrel

==== Dormice ====
- Balochistan forest dormouse
- Roach's mouse-tailed dormouse

== Bats ==
There are 104 species and one subspecies of bat assessed as vulnerable.

=== Megabats ===
Species

- Sulawesi flying fox
- Palawan fruit bat
- Sunda flying fox
- Biak naked-backed fruit bat
- Brooks's dyak fruit bat
- Madagascan fruit bat
- Philippine dawn bat
- Sulawesi harpy fruit bat
- Javan tailless fruit bat
- White-collared fruit bat
- Long-tailed fruit bat
- New Caledonia blossom bat
- Keast's tube-nosed fruit bat
- Lesser tube-nosed bat
- New Georgian monkey-faced bat
- Aldabra flying fox
- Vanuatu flying fox
- Ashy-headed flying fox
- Bismarck masked flying fox
- Moluccan flying fox
- Makira flying fox
- Ryukyu flying fox
- Nicobar flying fox
- Lyle's flying fox
- Black-eared flying fox
- Caroline flying fox
- Mauritian flying fox
- Ceram fruit bat
- Ornate flying fox
- Pelew flying fox
- Geelvink Bay flying fox
- Grey-headed flying fox
- Madagascan flying fox
- Temminck's flying fox
- Kosrae flying fox
- New Caledonia flying fox
- Pemba flying fox
- Manado fruit bat
- Madagascan rousette
- Comoro rousette
- Bare-backed rousette
- Halmahera blossom bat

Subspecies

- Yap flying fox

=== Microbats ===
There are 64 microbat species assessed as vulnerable.

==== Old World leaf-nosed bats ====
- Malayan tailless leaf-nosed bat
- Short-tailed roundleaf bat
- Makira roundleaf bat
- Khajuria's leaf-nosed bat
- Hill's roundleaf bat
- Thailand roundleaf bat
- Arnhem leaf-nosed bat
- Phou Khao Khouay leaf-nosed bat
- Aellen's roundleaf bat
- Orbiculus leaf-nosed bat
- Ridley's leaf-nosed bat
- Shield-nosed leaf-nosed bat
- Sorensen's leaf-nosed bat
- Grandidier's trident bat

==== Horseshoe bats ====
- Canut's horseshoe bat
- Cohen's horseshoe bat
- Upland horseshoe bat
- Madura horseshoe bat
- Mehely's horseshoe bat
- Ruwenzori horseshoe bat

==== Vesper bats ====
- Coppery pipistrelle
- Social pipistrelle
- Large-eared pied bat
- Large false serotine
- Flores woolly bat
- Jamaican red bat
- Cuban yellow bat
- Minor red bat
- Bronze tube-nosed bat
- Gilded tube-nosed bat
- Long-fingered bat
- Dominican myotis
- Gray bat
- Barbados myotis
- Rickett's big-footed bat
- Scott's mouse-eared bat
- Mandelli's mouse-eared bat
- Fish-eating bat
- Azores noctule
- Japanese noctule
- Greater noctule bat
- Madeira pipistrelle
- Sardinian long-eared bat
- Canary big-eared bat
- Tiny yellow bat
- Least yellow bat

==== Free-tailed bats ====
- Northern free-tailed bat
- Florida bonneted bat
- Little goblin bat
- East-coast free-tailed bat
- Incan little mastiff bat
- Harrison's large-eared giant mastiff bat

==== Leaf-nosed bats ====
- Greater long-tailed bat
- Southern long-nosed bat
- Marinkelle's sword-nosed bat
- Orinoco sword-nosed bat
- Banana bat
- Choco broad-nosed bat
- Melissa's yellow-eared bat

==== Other microbat species ====
- Smoky bat
- Ecuadorian sac-winged bat
- Thomas's sac-winged bat
- Cuban funnel-eared bat
- Kitti's hog-nosed bat
- Ghost bat
- Common bent-wing bat
- New Zealand lesser short-tailed bat
- Cuban greater funnel-eared bat
- Javan slit-faced bat
- Hildegarde's tomb bat

== Other mammal species ==
- Giant anteater
- Giant armadillo
- Grey-faced sengi
- Brazilian three-banded armadillo
- Eastern long-beaked echidna

== See also ==
- Lists of IUCN Red List vulnerable species
- List of least concern mammals
- List of near threatened mammals
- List of endangered mammals
- List of critically endangered mammals
- List of recently extinct mammals
- List of data deficient mammals
