= Habromys =

Scientific classification
- Domain: Eukaryota
- Kingdom: Animalia
- Phylum: Chordata
- Class: Mammalia
- Order: Rodentia
- Family: Cricetidae
- Subfamily: Neotominae
- Tribe: Reithrodontomyini
- Genus: Habromys; Hooper & Musser, 1964

Type species
- Peromyscus lepturus

Species
- Habromys chinanteco Habromys delicatulus Habromys ixtlani Habromys lepturus Habromys lophurus Habromys simulatus Habromys schmidlyi

Genus of rodents

Habromys is a genus of rodent in the family Cricetidae, found in Mexico and Central America. It contains these species, all but one (H. lophurus) of which are threatened or endangered, five of them critically so. H. lophurus is near threatened.

Species:

- Chinanteco deer mouse (Habromys chinanteco)
- Delicate deer mouse (Habromys delicatulus)
- Ixtlán deer mouse (Habromys ixtlani)
- Zempoaltepec deer mouse (Habromys lepturus)
- Crested-tailed deer mouse (Habromys lophurus)
- Jico deer mouse (Habromys simulatus)
- Schmidly's deer mouse (Habromys schmidlyi)
