= Ixtlán deer mouse =

Conservation status
- Critically Endangered (IUCN 3.1)

Scientific classification
- Kingdom: Animalia
- Phylum: Chordata
- Class: Mammalia
- Order: Rodentia
- Family: Cricetidae
- Subfamily: Neotominae
- Genus: Habromys
- Species: H. ixtlani

Binomial name
- Habromys ixtlani Goodwin, 1964

Species of rodent

The Ixtlán deer mouse (Habromys ixtlani) is a species of rodent in the family Cricetidae.

It is endemic to southwestern Mexico, and found in the Sierra de Juárez, a subrange of the Sierra Madre de Oaxaca in Oaxaca state.

Although it was originally described as a species, it was reevaluated by Musser in 1969, who determined it to be a subspecies of the Zempoaltepec deer mouse (Habromys lepturus). Another evaluation by Carleton et al. in 2002 of H. lepturus and the other species of the genus Habromys determined significant morphological differences between H. lepturus and H. ixtlani, and H. ixtlani was reclassified as a separate species.

== See also ==
- Endemic fauna of Mexico
- Sierra Madre de Oaxaca topics
