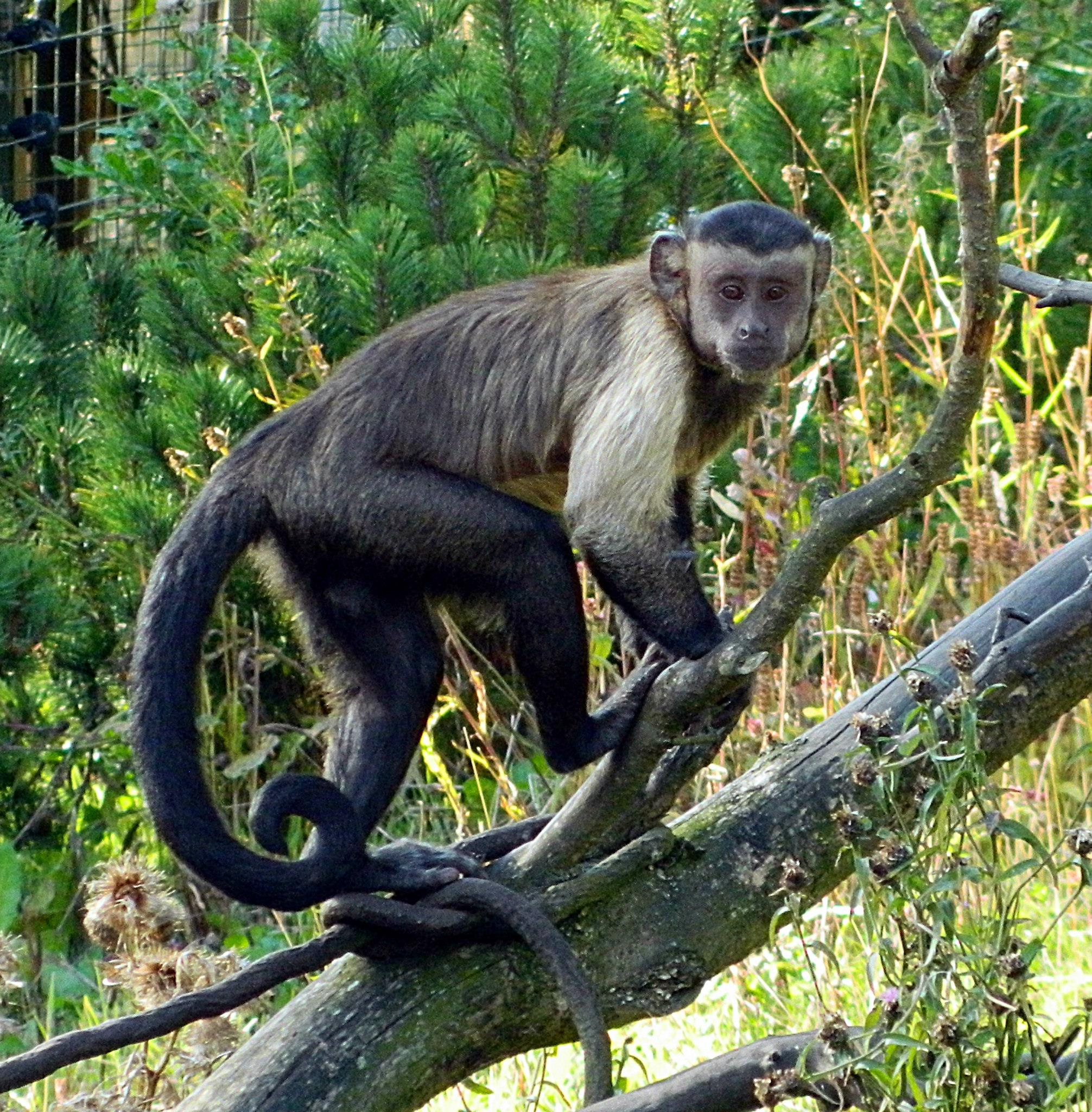

Conservation status
- Critically Endangered (IUCN 3.1)

Scientific classification
- Kingdom: Animalia
- Phylum: Chordata
- Class: Mammalia
- Order: Primates
- Family: Cebidae
- Genus: Sapajus
- Species: S. apella
- Subspecies: S. a. margaritae

Trinomial name
- Sapajus apella margaritae (Hollister, 1914)

Synonyms
- Cebus apella margaritae Hollister, 1914

= Margarita Island capuchin =

Subspecies of monkey

The Margarita Island capuchin (Sapajus apella margaritae), also known as the tufted Margarita Island capuchin or mono de margarita, is a subspecies of the tufted capuchin that only resides in the Caribbean Sea on Margarita Island, Venezuela.

The Margarita Island capuchin are medium-sized monkeys with black arms, legs, tail, and head with a brown abdomen and back. They are primates that tend to travel in groups of 2–18 monkeys. Margarita Island capuchins are frugivorous but also enjoy bromeliad leaves, insects, cactus, and small vertebrates. Margarita island capuchins are the main primate on Margarita Island, serving as an important seed distributor.

Margarita Island capuchins are listed in the International Union for Conservation of Nature (IUCN) as a critically endangered species with a declining population as well as on the Venezuelan red list. The decline is population is due to habitat fragmentation, hunting, and pet trade. Conservation efforts are being made to provide protected areas and educate others on the dwindling population.

== Taxonomy ==
The Margarita Island capuchin belongs to the family of Cebidae, which is part of the New World monkeys consisting of squirrel monkeys and capuchin monkeys. They have been recognized as a sub-species of the tufted capuchin. The Margarita Island Capuchin has a genus of sapajus, along with other capuchin monkeys. The Margarita Island Capuchin is most closely related to the black-capped capuchin also known as the tufted capuchin (sapajus apella).

Its a fairly small species of capuchin, with beige and black features. They are mainly frugivorous, but also indulge in insects, bromeliad leaves, cactus, and some small vertebrae's. This species is the main predator on the island and does not have any predators on the island themselves. They reside in smaller groups of 2–18 individuals.

The Margarita Island capuchin population has been decreasing over time, with the population being about 200–350 in 1994 (Sans and Marquez,1994). This ongoing decrease in population is mostly due to habitat fragmentation, illegal trade, and hunting. Projects are underway to conserve this species.

== Taxonomy history ==
Sapajus apella margaritae was originally described under the name Cebus apella margaritae. In the 1700s, studies proved there were enough behavioral, genetic, and ecological differences within the capuchin species that they could bit split into two genera, the robust tufted (Sapajus) capuchins and gracile (Cebus) capuchins. Around the 2000s, studies had argued that the categories were so morphologically different they could be considered separate subgenera, it was then that Cebus apella margaritae was changed to the current Sapajus apella margaritae.

== Physical description ==
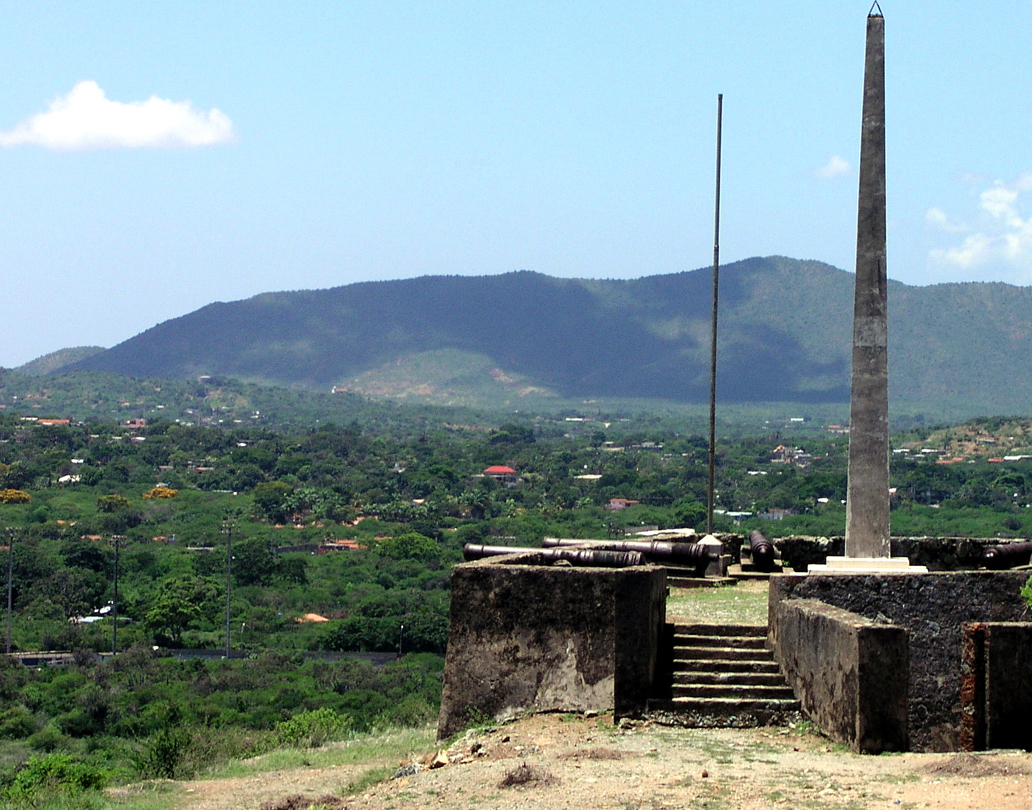
Margarita Island, Venezuela

The Margarita Island capuchin consists of a black head and neck with side burns that extend from the top of the head to their throat. They also have a black tail, hands, legs, and upper legs. The shoulder and upper arm is beige while their back is light brown with a dark stripe from their neck to their tail. They also have black hair around their ears that can form tufts. Infant and Juvenile Margarita Island Capuchins look the same as adults with lighter-colored forehead. Females have a head and trunk on average of 38 cm and a weight of 2.5 kg. Males head and trunk are about 41 cm with a weight of 3.7 kg. Both males and females have a tail length of about 40 cm.

== Distribution and habitat ==
The Margarita Island capuchin has a limited distribution on the East side of Margarita Island. Margarita Island spans about 394 square miles and is the only location this species of monkey is found. They live in mountain forests with low altitudes, usually around 300 to 500 m above sea level but can also be found 40 to 830 m above sea. This species tends to reside in the trees 5–10 m above ground but also use the ground often. The also reside in protected forests in Margarita Islands national parks- Cerro el Copey and national monument- Cerro Matasiete y Guayamuri. The species distribution across the island may be due to the fragmented habitat they reside on.

== Conservation status ==
At one time the Margarita Island capuchin was the only primate on Margarita Island in Venezuela, playing an important role in seed dispersal and being the main predator on the island. Although over the years the species population has been decreasing, landing the Margarita Island Capuchin on the IUCN red List as a critically endangered species since 1996 and on the Venezuelan red list. Mainly due to habitat fragmentation, hunting, and illegal trade.

In 2005 a multidisciplinary team put together the "Margarita Island Capuchin Project" in order to research the species population, conduct studies, educate others, and provide conservation efforts. Two national parks and three natural monuments have been declared protected areas.
