= Crested-tailed deer mouse =

Conservation status
- Near Threatened (IUCN 3.1)

Scientific classification
- Kingdom: Animalia
- Phylum: Chordata
- Class: Mammalia
- Order: Rodentia
- Family: Cricetidae
- Subfamily: Neotominae
- Genus: Habromys
- Species: H. lophurus

Binomial name
- Habromys lophurus (Osgood, 1904)

Species of rodent

The crested-tailed deer mouse (Habromys lophurus) is a species of rodent in the family Cricetidae found in El Salvador, Guatemala, and Mexico.
