= Darién small-eared shrew =

Conservation status
- Endangered (IUCN 3.1)

Scientific classification
- Kingdom: Animalia
- Phylum: Chordata
- Class: Mammalia
- Order: Eulipotyphla
- Family: Soricidae
- Genus: Cryptotis
- Species: C. merus

Binomial name
- Cryptotis merus Goldman Benso, 1912
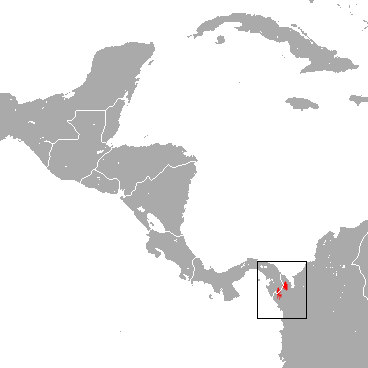
- Darién small-eared shrew range

Synonyms
- Cryptotis mera

Species of mammal

The Darién small-eared shrew (Cryptotis merus) is a species of mammal in the family Soricidae. It is known only from montane regions along the border between Colombia and Darién Province, Panama, where it has been found in rainforest at elevations from 1400 to 1500 m. It has terrestrial habits.
