= Chinanteco deer mouse =

Conservation status
- Critically Endangered (IUCN 3.1)

Scientific classification
- Kingdom: Animalia
- Phylum: Chordata
- Class: Mammalia
- Order: Rodentia
- Family: Cricetidae
- Subfamily: Neotominae
- Genus: Habromys
- Species: H. chinanteco

Binomial name
- Habromys chinanteco (Robertson & Musser, 1976)

Species of rodent

The Chinanteco deer mouse (Habromys chinanteco) is a species of rodent in the family Cricetidae. It is endemic to Mexico.

This species is known to live in only one location, on Cerro Pelón in the Sierra Juarez, Oaxaca, between 2,080 and 2,650 meters elevation.
