= Delicate deer mouse =

Conservation status
- Endangered (IUCN 3.1)

Scientific classification
- Kingdom: Animalia
- Phylum: Chordata
- Class: Mammalia
- Order: Rodentia
- Family: Cricetidae
- Subfamily: Neotominae
- Genus: Habromys
- Species: H. delicatulus

Binomial name
- Habromys delicatulus Carleton, Sánchez & Urbano Vidales, 2002

Species of rodent

The delicate deer mouse (Habromys delicatulus) is a species of rodent in the family Cricetidae. It was first described by Michael Carlton, Oscar Sanchez and Guillermina Urbano-Vidales after being discovered in a patch of cloud forest on the Trans-Mexican Volcanic Belt. The species gets its name from its small size and delicate features compared to the other species within the genus Habromys.
