= Habromys schmidlyi =

Schmidly's deer mouse

Conservation status
- Critically Endangered (IUCN 3.1)

Scientific classification
- Kingdom: Animalia
- Phylum: Chordata
- Class: Mammalia
- Order: Rodentia
- Family: Cricetidae
- Subfamily: Neotominae
- Genus: Habromys
- Species: H. schmidlyi

Binomial name
- Habromys schmidlyi Romo-Vázquez, León-Paniagua & Sánchez, 2005

Species of rodent

Habromys schmidlyi, sometimes known as Schmidly's deer mouse, is a species of rodent in the family Cricetidae found only in Mexico. Its natural habitat is cloud forest in the Sierra de Taxco, on the border of Guerrero and Mexico states, at elevations between 1,800 and 2,400 metres (5,900 and 7,900 feet). It is a nocturnal species, and is thought to be omnivorous.

H. schmidlyi is a small species within its genus, measuring 72 to 78 mm (2.8 to 3.1 in) in length with a 72 to 89 mm (2.8 to 3.5 in) tail. Adults weigh 10 to 15 grams (0.35 to 0.53 ounces). It is a cinnamon to reddish brown coloured rodent with black ears, a dark, hairy tail, white underparts and brownish hindfeet.

The name "Schmidly's deer mouse" is ambiguous, as it is shared by another species, Peromyscus schmidlyi.
