= Jico deer mouse =

Conservation status
- Critically Endangered (IUCN 3.1)

Scientific classification
- Kingdom: Animalia
- Phylum: Chordata
- Class: Mammalia
- Order: Rodentia
- Family: Cricetidae
- Subfamily: Neotominae
- Genus: Habromys
- Species: H. simulatus

Binomial name
- Habromys simulatus (Osgood, 1904)

Species of rodent

The Jico deer mouse (Habromys simulatus), also known as the xico deermouse, is a species of rodent in the family Cricetidae found only in Mexico. Its natural habitat is subtropical or tropical moist forests at altitudes between 1,830 and 2,000 metres (6,000 and 6,560 feet). It is a nocturnal, omnivorous, medium-sized species, measuring roughly 90 millimetres (3.5 inches) in length with a tail 78–111 mm (3.1–4.4 in) long. The fur on its belly is white, and on its back is dark brown. Around the metatarsal region of its feet, there are noticeable spots. The ears and tail are dark, though the latter may have a thin white line underneath, as well as a haired, brushy tip.

It is severely threatened by deforestation and human settlements within its range. Two populations of the Jico deer mouse were known, though one was thought to be extinct as of 2018, placing the total population of this species at 50 individuals. It resides in the Sierra Madre Oriental mountain range, which has been described as "one of the most restricted habitats in [Mexico]".
