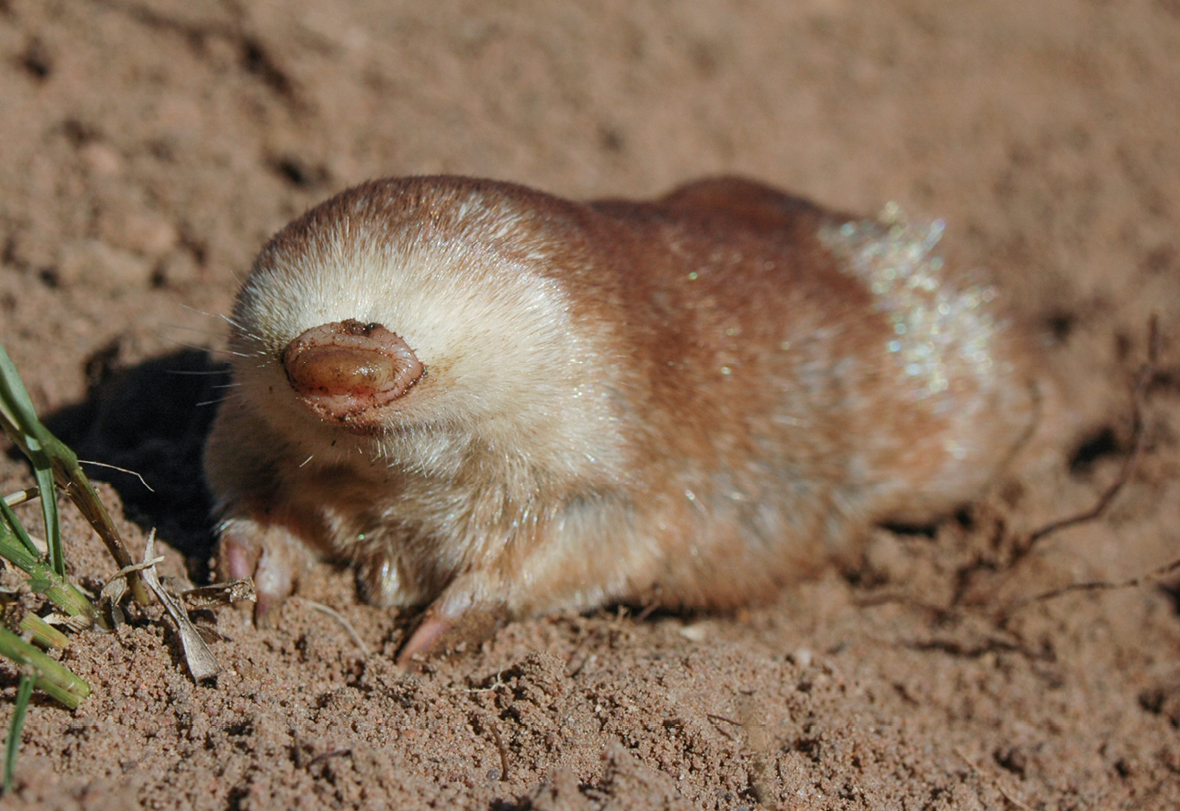

Conservation status
- Endangered (IUCN 3.1)

Scientific classification
- Kingdom: Animalia
- Phylum: Chordata
- Class: Mammalia
- Order: Afrosoricida
- Family: Chrysochloridae
- Genus: Neamblysomus
- Species: N. julianae

Binomial name
- Neamblysomus julianae (Meester, 1972)
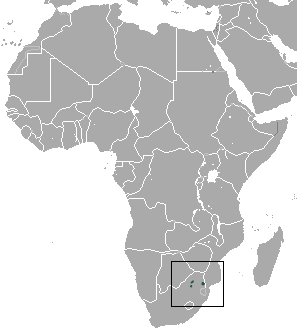
- Juliana's golden mole range

Synonyms
- Amblysomus julianae

= Juliana's golden mole =

Species of mammal

Juliana's golden mole (Neamblysomus julianae) is a golden mole endemic to South Africa. It is listed as an endangered species due to habitat loss and a restricted range. Golden moles are an ancient group of mammals that live mostly below ground. The eponymous Juliana is Juliana Meester, the wife of the South African zoologist who named this species.

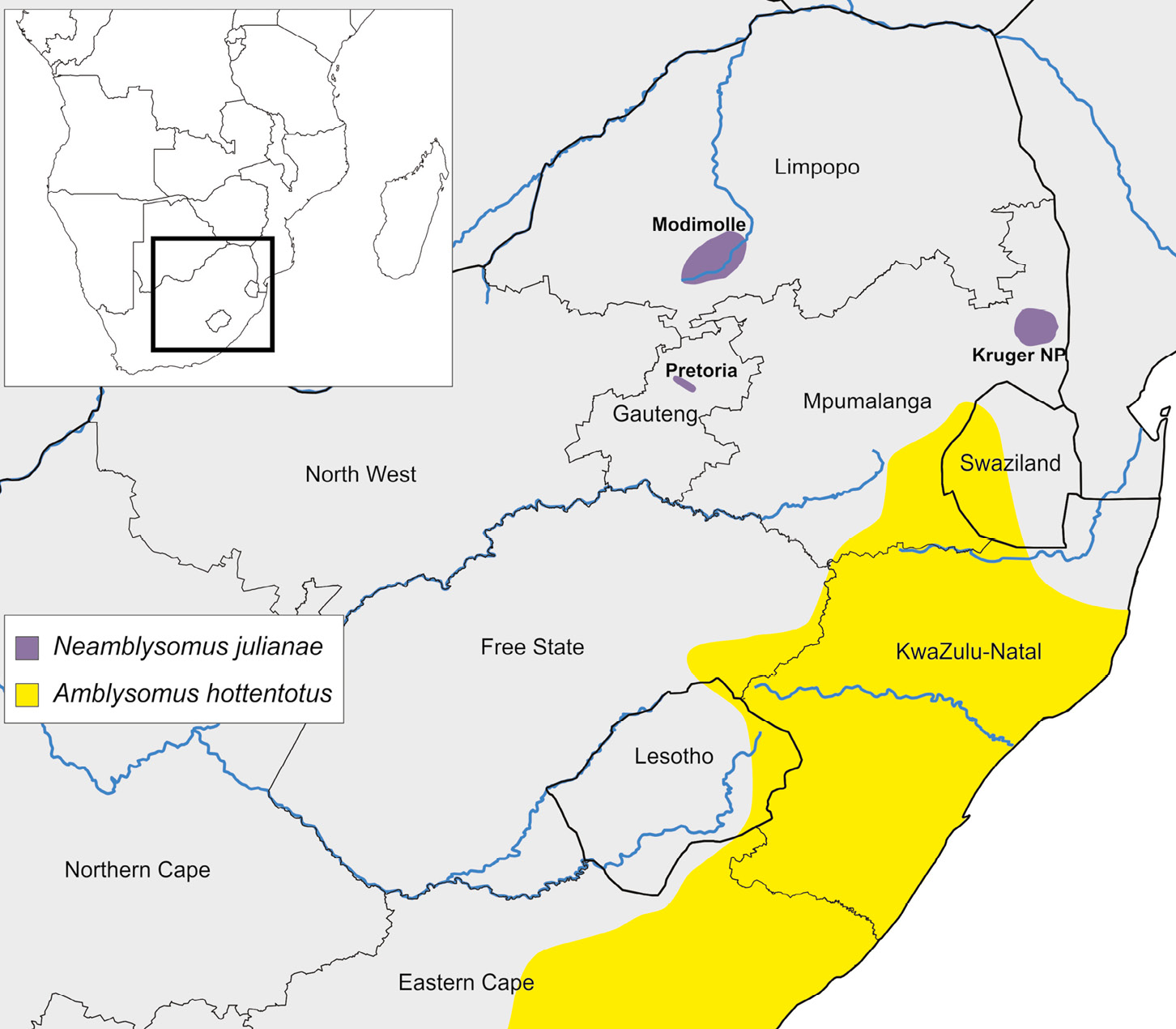
The regions in which Juliana's golden mole has been located

== Description ==
They have shiny golden coats of dense fur and a streamlined, formless appearance. They have no visible eyes or ears; in fact, they are blind – the small eyes are covered with hairy skin. The ears are small and are hidden in the animal's fur. Juliana's golden mole weighs 21–75 g (0.74–2.65 oz). This type of mole shares many physical characteristics with a typical golden mole, but they differ in size, tend to be smaller than other moles, and do not possess an as exaggeratedly sized middle ear bone. The Juliana's golden mole is well adapted for burrowing, they have strong hardened noses and smooth rounded bodies along with large front claws best suited for digging through the ground and webbed feet that help push soil out of the way as it makes its way through the substrate.

== Ecology ==
The Juliana's golden mole are solitary animals that live just under the soils surface, along weathered rocky ridges of quartzite or granite. It is also common in well-irrigated gardens. Usually two young are born, sometimes one. Golden moles eat invertebrates such as insects, earthworms and snails. Their young are born in a grass-lined cavity in the ground. Golden moles usually dig their tunnels just below the surface of the ground. The main feeding activity is in the late afternoon and at night. They exhibit torpor daily during the morning and early afternoon. This type of mole has very specific requirements for its habitat and it tends to need areas that have good tree cover along with hard grainy/sandy soil that is well draining. Since it requires very particular habitat regions this contributes to the vast separation between populations and the need for conservation of this species. Juliana's golden mole is very hard to locate since it spends most of its time underground and their tunnels are not easily visible apart from the few openings they create during the summer rainy seasons. This makes it difficult to gather necessary information about this species and currently little is still known about Juliana's golden mole.

== Status ==
Juliana's golden mole is found in Pretoria (Gauteng), Nylstroom (Limpopo Province) and Kruger National Park (Mpumalanga), South Africa. Where it occurs, Juliana's golden mole can be locally common. However, its occurrence is extremely patchy within its limited geographic range. Most other golden moles are considered wide spread but Juliana's golden mole lives in more isolated populations that can be separated by hundreds of kilometers. There are no data on population size. The population on Bronberg Ridge, Pretoria East, is severely affected by ongoing intensive urbanization and a mining operation, and it is considered to be critically endangered. The Nylsvley population in Limpopo occurs in farmlands (adjoining the Nylsvley Nature Reserve) that are subject to habitat alteration and potential degradation. Another threat is habitat fragmentation which causes obstruction to animal movement; this results in in-breeding which increases the possible risk of extinction. The International Union for Conservation of Nature now rates this species as "endangered". Conservation efforts of this species are limited and not well managed, this is mainly due to a lack of information on the Juliana's golden mole and their habitat regions. This species has not been studied extensively since it is hard to locate and gather information on. In order for more protection and conservation efforts to take place more studies needs to be conducted on this animal. Currently, this species of mole is being monitored when possible and some educational efforts are taking place to spread more awareness of the threats to and existence of this specific mole. Two out of the three populations are on protected land but more effort towards habitat protection is an important step in conserving Juliana's golden mole population.
