= Zempoaltepec deer mouse =

Conservation status
- Critically Endangered (IUCN 3.1)

Scientific classification
- Kingdom: Animalia
- Phylum: Chordata
- Class: Mammalia
- Order: Rodentia
- Family: Cricetidae
- Subfamily: Neotominae
- Genus: Habromys
- Species: H. lepturus

Binomial name
- Habromys lepturus (Merriam, 1898)

Species of rodent

The Zempoaltepec deer mouse (Habromys lepturus) also known as the slender-tailed deer mouse, is a species of rodent in the family Cricetidae.

It is endemic to southeastern Mexico, at one locality on Cerro Zempoaltepec above 2,500 metres (8,200 ft), in the Sierra Madre de Oaxaca in Oaxaca state.
