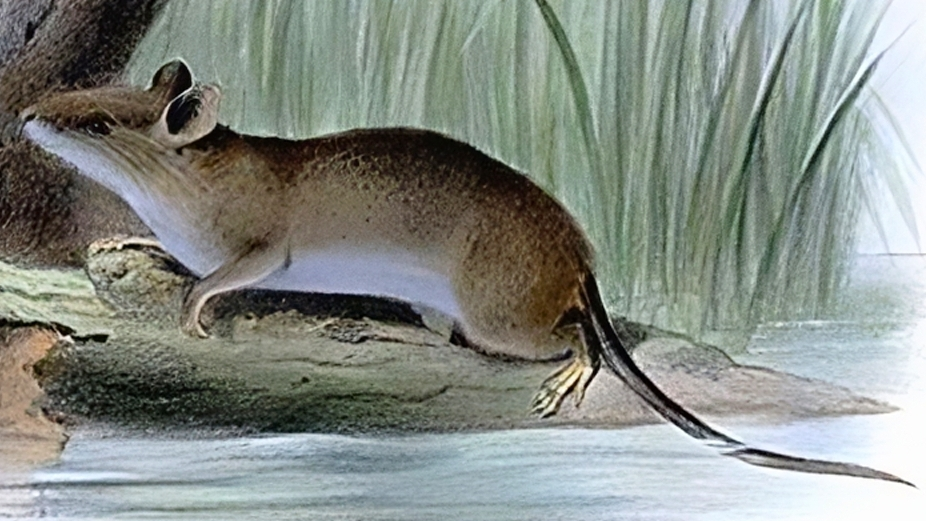
- Northern Luzon shrew-rat (Crunomys fallax)

Scientific classification
- Kingdom: Animalia
- Phylum: Chordata
- Class: Mammalia
- Order: Rodentia
- Family: Muridae
- Subfamily: Murinae
- Tribe: Rattini
- Genus: Crunomys; Thomas, 1897

Type species
- Crunomys fallax

Species
- Crunomys celebensis Crunomys fallax Crunomys melanius Crunomys suncoides

= Crunomys =

Genus of rodents

Crunomys is a genus of rodent in the family Muridae widespread to the Southeast Asian. They are mid-sized rodents, similar to rats, that live on the ground of tropical rainforests. There they build nests, padded with fallen leaves from trees. They feed on roots, fallen fruit, and other plants, as well as insects. All species are shy and avoid food from humans.

== Taxonomy ==
This genus previously contained only four species, namely C. celebensis, C. fallax, C. melanius,C. suncoides, and C tompotika. Then in 2025 through mitochondrial and nuclear differentiation, the genus Maxomys which was considered a separate species was synonymized to the genus Crunomys and now 24 species have been identified.

- Celebes shrew-rat (Crunomys celebensis)
- Northern Luzon shrew-rat (Crunomys fallax)
- Mindanao shrew-rat (Crunomys melanius)
- Katanglad shrew-mouse (Crunomys suncoides)
- Mount Tompotika spiny-rat (Crunomys tompotika)

Previously Maxomys

- Mountain spiny rat, Crunomys alticola Thomas, 1888, Borneo
- Small spiny rat, Crunomys baeodon Thomas, 1894, Borneo
- Bartels's spiny rat, Crunomys bartelsii Jentink, 1910, Java
- Dollman's spiny rat, Crunomys dollmani Ellerman, 1941, Sulawesi
- Hellwald's spiny rat, Crunomys hellwaldii Jentink, 1878, Sulawesi
- Sumatran spiny rat, Crunomys hylomyoides Robinson and Kloss, 1916, Sumatra
- Malayan mountain spiny rat, Crunomys inas Bonhote, 1906, Malayan Peninsula
- Fat-nosed spiny rat, Crunomys inflatus Robinson and Kloss, 1916, Sumatra
- Mo's spiny rat, Crunomys moi Robinson and Kloss, 1922, Vietnam, Laos
- Musschenbroek's spiny rat, Crunomys musschenbroekii Jentink, 1878, Sulawesi
- Chestnut-bellied spiny rat, Crunomys ochraceiventer Thomas, 1894, Borneo
- Pagai spiny rat, Crunomys pagensis Miller, 1903, Mentawai Islands
- Palawan spiny rat, Crunomys panglima Robinson, 1921, Palawan and neighboring islands
- Rajah spiny rat, Crunomys rajah Thomas, 1894, Malayan Peninsula, Sumatra, Borneo
- Red spiny rat, Crunomys surifer Miller, 1900, Sumatra, Java, Borneo
- Crunomys tajuddinii Achmadi, Maryanto & Maharadatunkamsi, 2012, Malay Peninsula, Sumatra, Borneo
- Watts's spiny rat, Crunomys wattsi Musser, 1991, Sulawesi
- Whitehead's spiny rat, Crunomys whiteheadi Thomas, 1894, Malayan Peninsula, Sumatra, Borneo
