= List of mammals of Borneo =

The mammal species of Borneo include 288 species of terrestrial and 91 species of marine mammals recorded within the territorial boundaries of Brunei, Indonesia and Malaysia. The terrestrial mammals are dominated by the chiroptera (102 species of bats) and rodents (61 species of rats and mice).

== Introduction ==
The high diversity and endemicity of mammals is related to the many niches found in the tropical rain forest of Borneo and past Pleistocene events within the Sundaland region. During interglacial and post-glacial periods, there was migration of animal from the Asian mainland into Borneo and into Sulawesi via the Philippines. Due to lack of favourable habitats and small founder population, some species of animals have become extinct and others have radiated into endemic species. Of the 57 mammal species that were identified from archaeological remains in the Niah Caves, Sarawak, 13 were bats. Four of these were megachiropterans, Pteropus vampyrus, Rousettus amplexicaudatus, Rousettus sp and Eonycteris spelaea, all of which remain extant species in Borneo and Peninsular Malaysia. The provisional list of mammals of Borneo (sensu Lord Medway, Payne et al., Corbet and Hill, Koopman, and Wilson and Reeder) are listed below. There are various conflicts in the taxonomic lists by previous authors, which need further field research for validation.

== Taxonomic list ==
The following list gives the scientific name followed by the common names, description, ecology, conservation and distribution information.

=== Order: Erinaceomorpha ===
- Echinosorex gymnura, moonrat. Thailand, Malay Peninsula, Sabah, Sarawak, Brunei and Kalimantan.
- Hylomys dorsalis, Bornean short-tailed gymnure. Restricted to Bornean mountains.

=== Order: Soricomorpha ===
- Suncus murinus, house shrew. Africa, Asia, Thailand, Malay Peninsula, Sabah, Sarawak, Brunei and Kalimantan.
- Suncus ater, black shrew. Endemic to Borneo; known only from Gunung Kinabalu
- Suncus etruscus, Savi's pigmy shrew. Europe, Africa, Asia; Thailand, Malay Peninsula, Sabah and Sarawak.
- Crocidura monticola, Sunda shrew. Java, Lombok, Sumba and Flores; Malay Peninsula, Sabah, Sarawak, Brunei and Kalimantan.
- Crocidura fuliginosa, south-east Asia white-toothed shrew. India, Indochina, Thailand, Malay Peninsula, Sabah, Sarawak, Brunei and Kalimantan.
- Chimarrogale himalayica, Himalayan water shrew. Himalaya, south China, Southeast Asia, Japan, Sumatra and Sabah.

=== Order: Scandentia ===
- Ptilocercus lowii, pentail treeshrew.
- Tupaia glis, common treeshrew.
- Tupaia splendidula, ruddy treeshrew.
- Tupaia montana, mountain tree shrew.
- Tupaia minor, lesser treeshrew.
- Tupaia gracilis, slender treeshrew.
- Tupaia picta, painted treeshrew.
- Tupaia dorsalis, striped treeshrew.
- Tupaia tana, large treeshrew.
- Dendrogale melanura, smooth-tailed treeshrew.

=== Order: Dermoptera ===
- Galeopterus variegatus, Sunda flying lemur

=== Order: Chiroptera ===
- Rousettus amplexicaudatus, Geoffroy's rousette
- Rousettus spinalatus, bare-backed rousette
- Pteropus vampyrus, large flying fox
- Pteropus hypomelanus, island flying fox

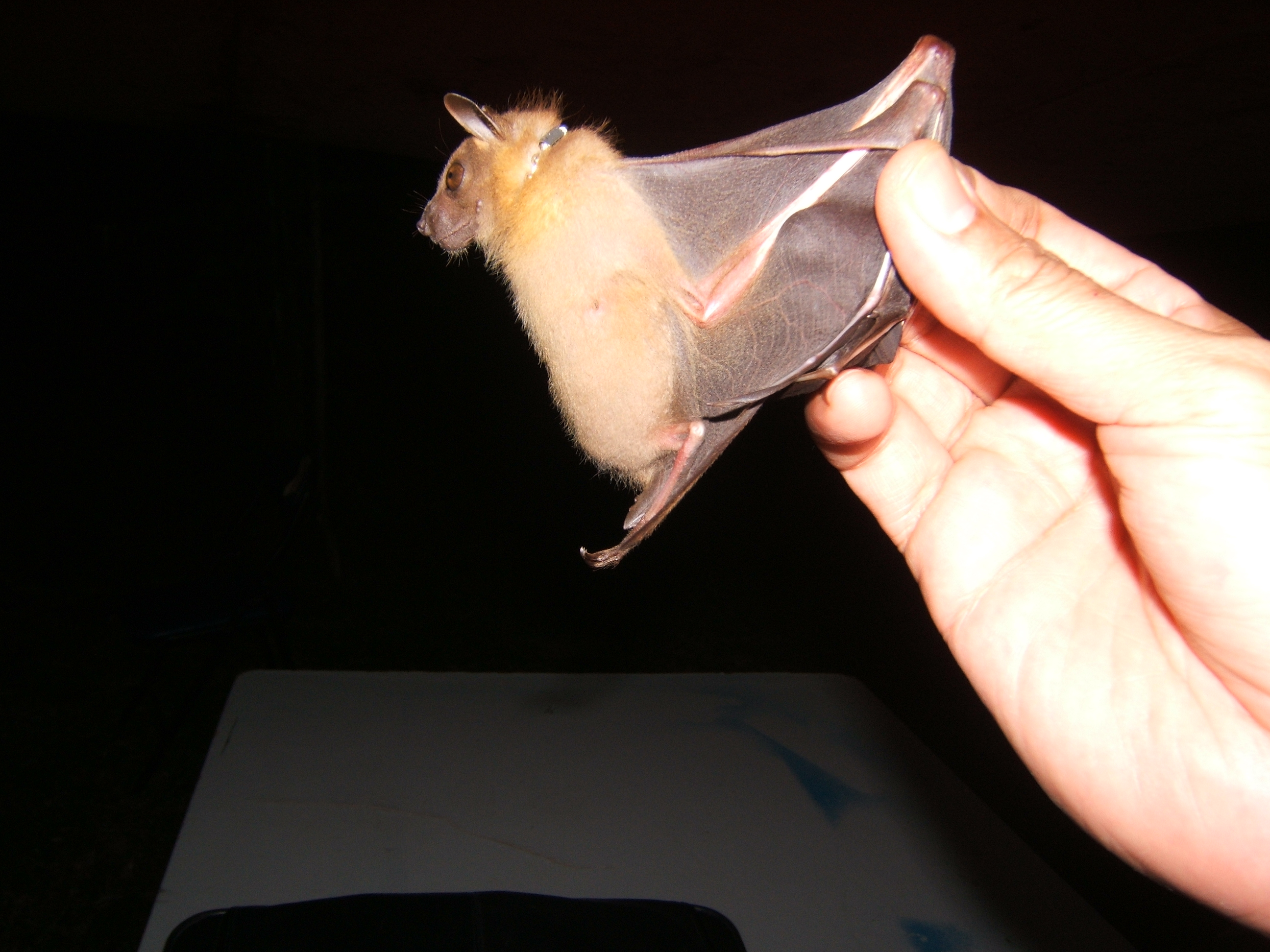
Large-sized Cynopterus brachyotis

- Cynopterus brachyotis, lesser short-nosed fruit bat
- Cynopterus sphinx, greater short-nosed fruit bat
- Cynopterus horsfieldi, Horsfield's fruit bat
- Penthetor lucasi, dusky fruit bat
- Megaerops ecaudatus, tailless fruit bat
- Megaerops wetmorei, white-collared fruit bat
- Dyacopterus spadiceus, Dayak fruit bat
- Chironax melanocephalus, black-capped fruit bat
- Balionycteris maculata, spotted-winged fruit bat
- Aethalops aequalis, grey fruit bat
- Eonycteris spelaea, cave nectar bat
- Eonycteris major, greater nectar bat
- Macroglossus minimus, long-tongued nectar bat
- Emballonura alecto, greater sheath-tailed bat
- Emballonura monticola, lesser sheath-tailed bat
- Saccolaimus saccolaimus, pouched tomb bat
- Taphozous melanopogon, black-bearded tomb bat
- Taphozous longimanus, long-winged tomb bat
- Megaderma spasma, lesser false vampire
- Nycteris tragata, hollow-faced bat
- Rhinolophus borneensis, Bornean horseshoe bat
- Rhinolophus pusillus, least horseshoe
- Rhinolophus arcuatus, arcuatus horseshoe bat

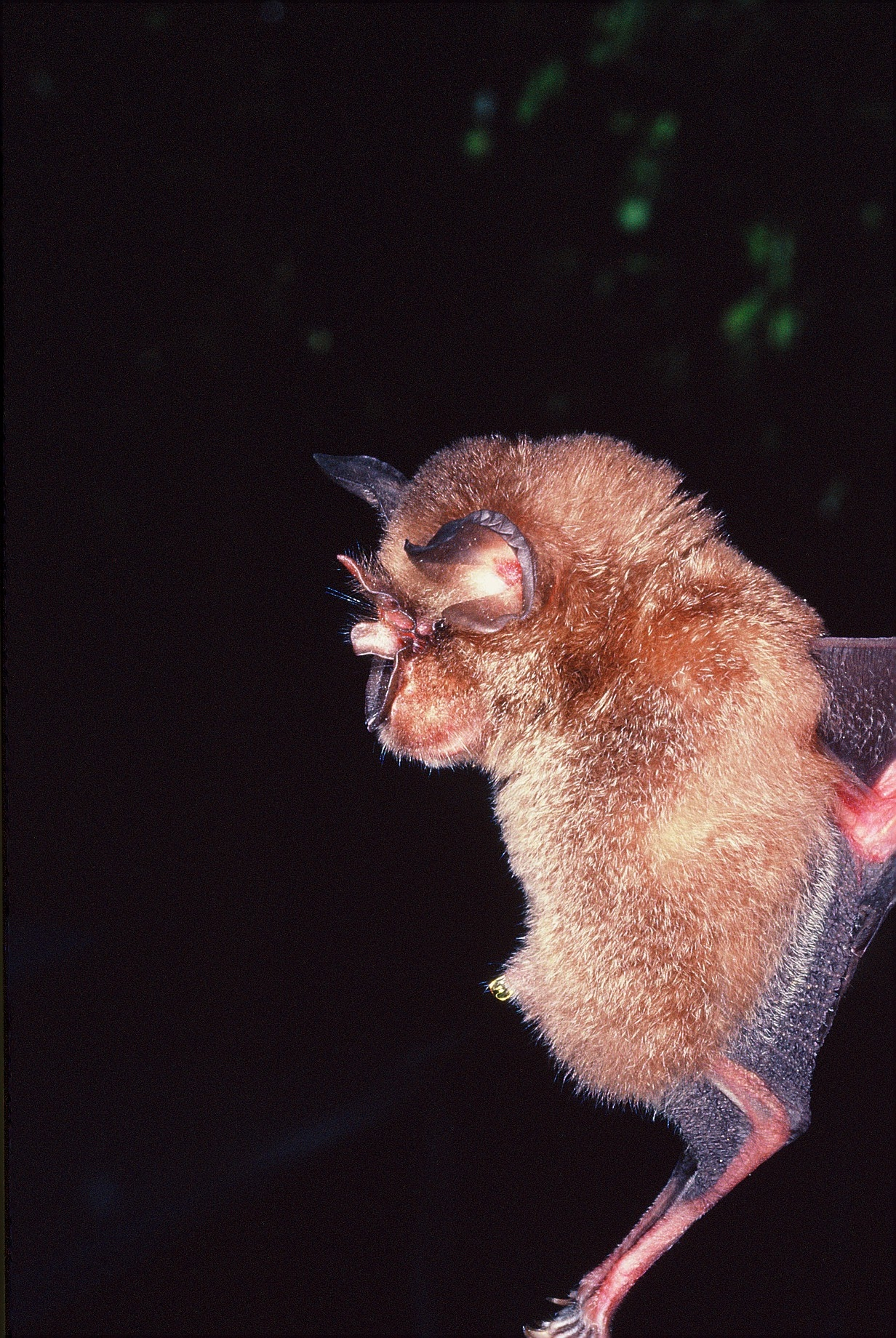
Rhinolophus arcuatus is rare in Borneo

- Rhinolophus acuminatus, acuminate horseshoe bat
- Rhinolophus affinis, intermediate horseshoe bat
- Rhinolophus creaghi, Creagh's horseshoe bat
- Rhinolophus philippinensis, Philippine horseshoe bat
- Rhinolophus trifoliatus, trefoil horseshoe bat
- Rhinolophus sedulus, lesser woolly horseshoe bat
- Hipposideros ater, dusky roundleaf bat
- Hipposideros bicolor, bicolor roundleaf bat
- Hipposideros cineraceus, ashy roundleaf bat
- Hipposideros dyacorum, Dayak roundleaf bat
- Hipposideros doriae, least roundleaf

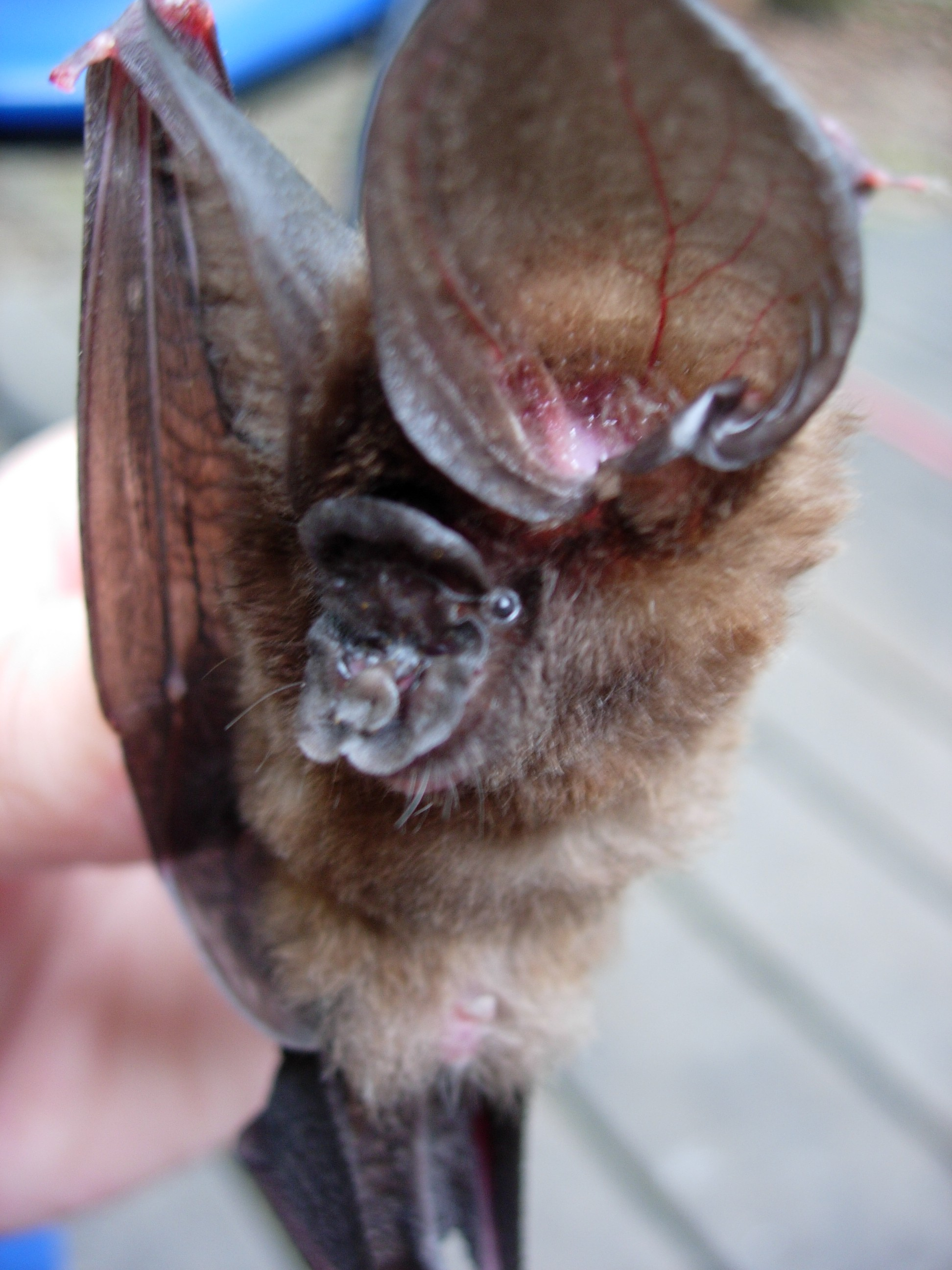
Hipposideros ridleyi, also known as Ridley's roundleaf

- Hipposideros ridleyi, Ridley's roundleaf bat
- Hipposideros cervinus, fawn roundleaf bat
- Hipposideros galeritus, Cantor's roundleaf bat
- Hipposideros coxi, Cox's roundleaf bat
- Hipposideros larvatus, intermediate roundleaf bat
- Hipposideros diadema, diadem roundleaf bat
- Coelops robinsoni, lesser tailless roundleaf bat
- Myotis muricola, whiskered myotis
- Myotis ater, black myotis
- Myotis montivagus, large brown myotis
- Myotis siligorensis, small-toothed myotis
- Myotis ridleyi, Ridley's myotis
- Myotis horsfieldii, Horsfield's myotis
- Myotis hasseltii, Hasselt's large-footed myotis
- Myotis adversus, grey large-footed myotis
- Myotis macrotarsus, pallid large-footed myotis
- Pipistrellus javanicus, Javan pistrelle
- Pipistrellus tenuis, least pipistrelle
- Pipistrellus ceylonicus, dark brown pipistrelle
- Hypsugo kitcheneri, red-brown pipistrelle
- Falsistrellus petersi, wooly pipistrelle
- Arielulus cuprosus, coppery pipistrelle
- Hypsugo imbricatus, brown pipistrelle
- Hypsugo macrotis, big-eared pipistrelle
- Pipistrellus vordermanni, white-winged pipistrelle
- Glischropus tylopus, thick-thumb pipistrelle
- Philetor brachypterus, narrow-winged brown bat
- Hesperoptenus doriae, false serotine
- Hesperoptenus blanfordi, least false serotine
- Hesperoptenus tomesi, Tomes' false serotine
- Tylonycteris robustula, greater bamboo bat
- Tylonycteris pachypus, lesser bamboo bat
- Scotophilus kuhlii, yellow house bat
- Murina cyclotis, orange tube-nosed bat
- Murina aenea, bronzed tube-nosed bat
- Murina rozendaali, gilded tube-nosed bat
- Murina suilla, lesser tube-nosed bat
- Harpiocephalus harpia, hairy-winged bat
- Kerivoula papillosa, papillose woolly bat
- Kerivoula hardwickii, Hardwicke's woolly bat
- Kerivoula pellucida, clear-winged woolly bat
- Kerivoula intermedia, small woolly bat
- Kerivoula minuta, least woolly bat
- Kerivoula whiteheadi, Whitehead's woolly bat
- Kerivoula lenis, lenis woolly bat
- Phoniscus jagorii, frosted groove-toothed bat
- Phoniscus atrox, gilded groove-thoothed bat
- Miniopterus magnater, large bent-winged bat
- Miniopterus schreibersi, common bent-winged bat
- Miniopterus pusillus, small bent-winged bat
- Miniopterus medius, medium bent-winged bat
- Miniopterus australis, lesser bent-winged bat
- Cheiromeles torquatus, naked bat
- Mops mops, free-tailed bat
- Chaerephon plicata, wrinkle-lipped bat

=== Order: Primates ===
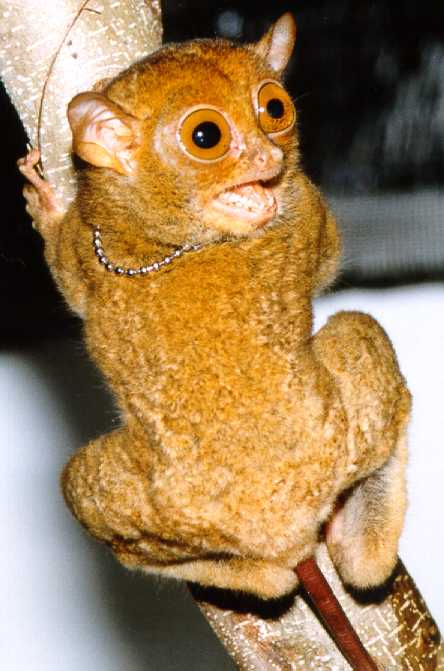
The Horsfield's tarsier in Sarawak is a protected species

- Nycticebus coucang, Sunda slow loris
- Tarsius bancanus, Horsfield's tarsier
- Presbytis hosei, Hose's langur
- Presbytis rubicunda, maroon langur
- Presbytis chrysomelas, Sarawak surili
- Presbytis frontata, white-fronted langur
- Trachypithecus cristatus, silvered langur
- Nasalis larvatus, proboscis monkey
- Macaca fascicularis, long-tailed macaque
- Macaca nemestrina, pig-tailed macaque
- Hylobates muelleri, Müller's Bornean gibbon
- Hylobates albibarbis, Bornean white-bearded gibbon
- Pongo pygmaeus, Bornean orangutan

=== Order: Pholidota ===
- Manis javanica, pangolin

=== Order: Rodentia ===
- Ratufa affinis, giant squirrel
- Callosciurus prevostii, Prevost's squirrel
- Callosciurus baluensis, Kinabalu squirrel
- Callosciurus notatus, plantain squirrel
- Callosciurus adamsi, ear-spot squirrel
- Callosciurus orestes, Bornean black-banded squirrel
- Sundasciurus hippurus, horse-tailed squirrel
- Sundasciurus lowii, Low's squirrel
- Sundasciurus tenuis, slender squirrel
- Sundasciurus jentinki, Jentink's squirrel
- Sundasciurus brookei, Brooke's squirrel
- Glyphotes simus, red-bellied sculptor squirrel
- Lariscus insignis, three-striped ground squirrel
- Lariscus hosei, four-striped ground squirrel
- Dremomys everetti, Bornean mountain ground squirrel
- Rhinosciurus laticaudatus, shrew-faced ground squirrel
- Nannosciurus melanotis, black-eared pigmy squirrel
- Exilisciurus exilis, plain pigmy squirrel
- Exilisciurus whiteheadi, Whitehead's pigmy squirrel
- Rheithrosciurus macrotis, tufted ground squirrel
- Petaurillus hosei, Hose's pigmy flying squirrel
- Petaurillus emiliae, lesser pigmy flying squirrel
- Iomys horsfieldii, Horsfield's flying squirrel
- Aeromys tephromelas, black flying squirrel
- Aeromys thomasi, Thomas's flying squirrel
- Petinomys hageni, Hagen's flying squirrel
- Petinomys genibarbis, whiskered flying squirrel
- Petinomys setosus, Temminck's flying squirrel
- Petinomys vordermanni, Vordermann's flying squirrel
- Hylopetes lepidus, grey-cheeked flying squirrel
- Hylopetes spadiceus, red-cheeked flying squirrel
- Pteromyscus pulverulentus, smoky flying squirrel
- Petaurista petaurista, red giant flying squirrel
- Petaurista elegans, spotted giant flying squirrel
- Rattus rattus, house rat
- Rattus tiomanicus, Malaysian field rat
- Rattus argentiventer, ricefield rat
- Rattus baluensis, summit rat
- Rattus exulans, Polynesia rat
- Rattus norvegicus, Norway rat
- Sundamys muelleri, Muller's rat
- Sundamys infraluteus, mountain giant rat

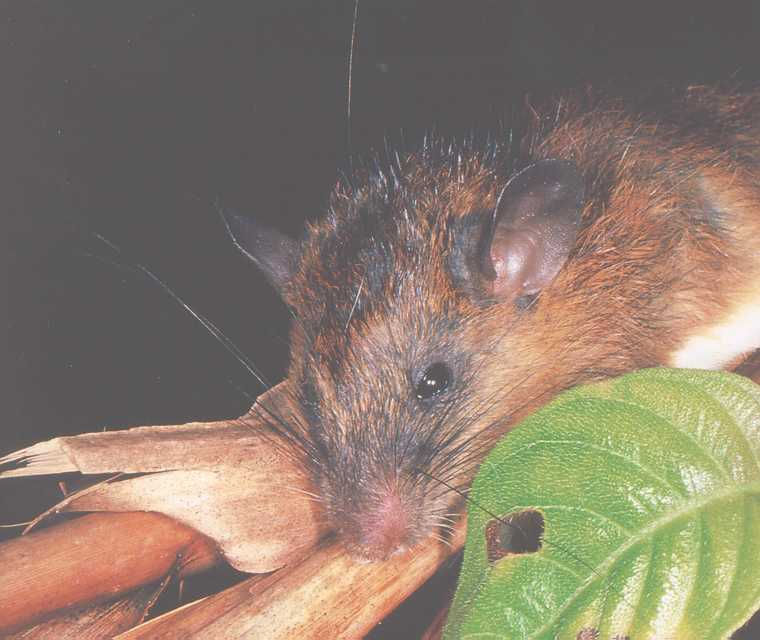
Niviventer cremoriventer in Borneo

- Niviventer cremoriventer, dark-tailed rat
- Niviventer rapit, long-tailed mountain rat
- Maxomys rajah, brown spiny rat

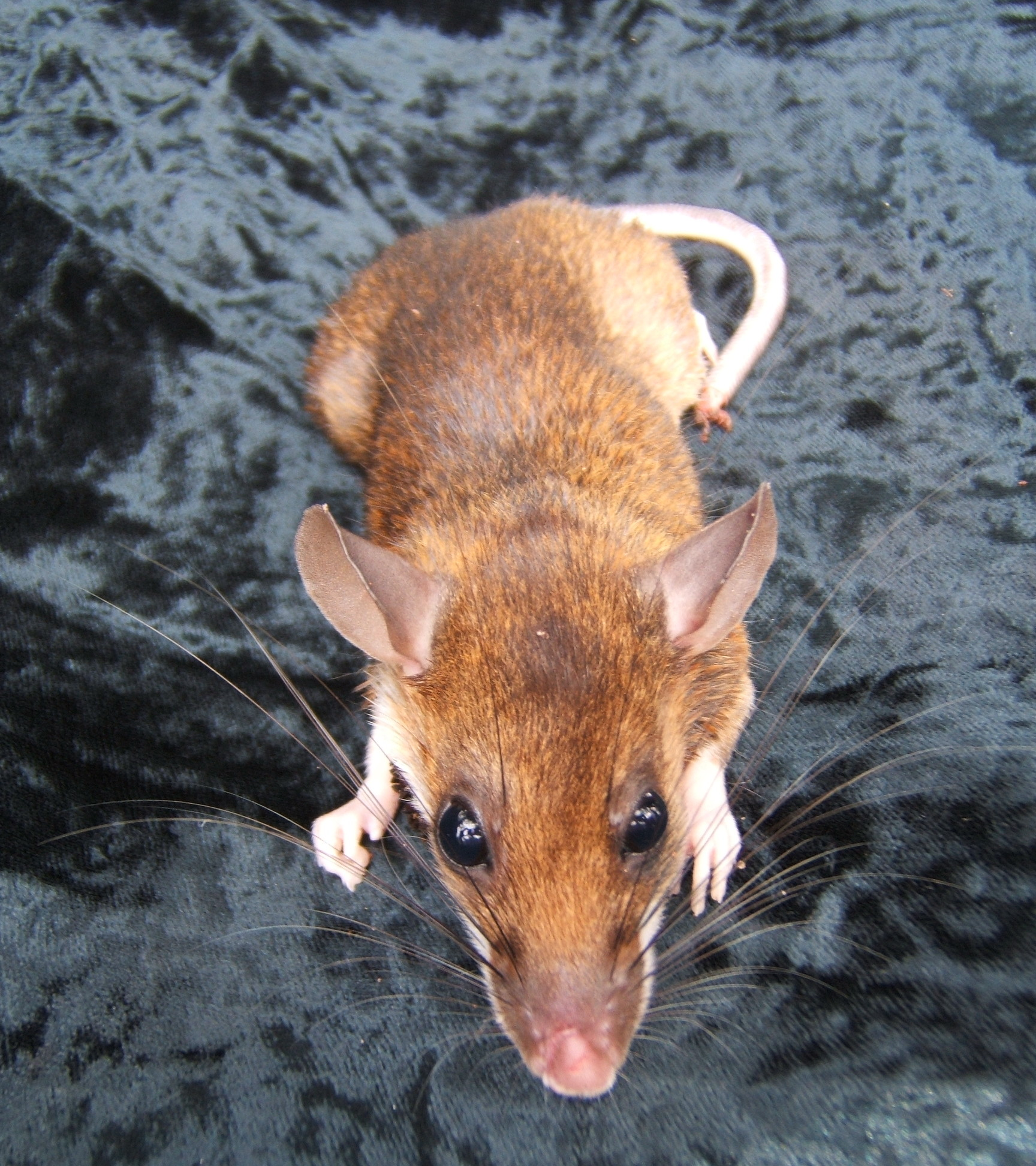
Maxomys surifer

- Maxomys surifer, red spiny rat
- Maxomys alticola, mountain spiny rat
- Maxomys ochraceiventer, chestnut-bellied spiny rat
- Maxomys baeodon, small spiny rat
- Maxomys whiteheadi, Whitehead's rat
- Leopoldamys sabanus, long-tailed giant rat
- Lenothrix canus, grey tree rat
- Mus musculus castaneus, Asian house rat
- Mus caroli, ricefield mouse
- Chiropodomys gliroides, common pencil-tailed tree-mouse
- Chiropodomys major, large pencil-tailed tree-mouse
- Chiropodomys muroides, grey-bellied pencil-tailed tree-mouse
- Haeromys margarettae, ranee mouse
- Trichys fasciculata, long-tailed porcupine
- Hystrix brachyura, common porcupine
- Hystrix crassispinis, thick-spined porcupine

=== Order: Cetacea ===
- Balaenoptera musculus, blue whale
- Balaenoptera physalus, fin whale
- Balaenoptera borealis, sei whale
- Balaenoptera edeni, Bryde's whale
- Balaenoptera acutorostrata, minke whale
- Megaptera novaeangliae, humpback whale
- Physeter macrocephalus, sperm whale
- Kogia breviceps, pigmy sperm whale
- Kogia simus, dwarf sperm whale
- Ziphius cavirostris, Cuvier's beak whale
- Mesoplodon sp., beaked whale
- Orcaella brevirostris, Irrawaddy dolphin
- Peponocephala electra, melon-headed whale
- Feresa attenuata, pigmy killer whale
- Pseudorca crassidens, false killer whale
- Orcinus orca, killer whale
- Globicephala macrorhynchus, short-finned pilot whale
- Steno bredanensis, rough-toothed dolphin
- Sousa chinensis, Indo-Pacific hump-backed dolphin
- Lagenodelphis hosei, Fraser's dolphin
- Delphinus delphis, common dolphin
- Tursiops truncatus, bottlenose dolphin
- Grampus griseus, Risso's dolphin
- Stenella attenuata, spotted dolphin
- Stenella coeruleoalba, striped dolphin
- Stenella longirostris, long-snouted spinner dolphin
- Neophocaena phocaenoides, finless porpoise

=== Order: Carnivora ===
- Bay cat, Catopuma badia EN
- Sunda clouded leopard, Neofelis diardi VU
- Marbled cat, Pardofelis marmorata NT
- Flat-headed cat, Prionailurus planiceps EN
- Sunda leopard cat, Prionailurus javanensis
- Helarctos malayanus, sun bear
- Martes flavigula, yellow-throated marten
- Mustela nudipes, Malay weasel
- Melogale everetti, Bornean ferret-badger
- Mydaus javanensis, Malay badger
- Lutra sumatrana, hairy-nosed otter
- Lutra lutra, Eurasian otter
- Lutrogale perspicillata, smooth-coated otter
- Aonyx cinereus, oriental small-clawed otter
- Viverra tangalunga, Malay civet
- Prionodon linsang, banded linsang
- Paradoxurus hermaphroditus, common palm civet
- Paguma larvata, masked palm civet
- Arctictis binturong, bearcat
- Arctogalidia trivirgata, small-toothed palm civet
- Hemigalus derbyanus, banded palm civet
- Diplogale hosei, Hose's civet
- Cynogale bennettii, otter-civet
- Herpestes brachyurus, short-tailed mongoose
- Herpestes semitorquatus, collared mongoose

=== Order: Sirenia ===
- Dugong dugon, dugong

=== Order: Proboscidea ===
- Elephas maximus borneensis, Borneo elephant

=== Order: Perissodactyla ===
- Bornean rhinoceros, Dicerorhinus sumatrensis harrissoni. One individual found in eastern Kalimantan in 2016.

=== Order: Artiodactyla ===
- Sus barbatus, bearded pig
- Tragulus javanicus, lesser mouse-deer
- Tragulus napu, greater mouse-deer
- Muntiacus atherodes, Bornean yellow muntjac
- Muntiacus muntjak, red muntjac
- Rusa timorensis, Javan rusa
- Rusa unicolor, sambar deer
- Bos javanicus, banteng or tembadau. Present in Kalimantan, Sabah, and possibly Sarawak; believed extinct in Brunei.

== Extinct ==
- Bornean tiger, possibly EX

== See also ==
- Biodiversity of Borneo
- Fauna of Borneo
- Flora of Borneo
- Malaysian Wildlife Law
- Mammals of Australia
