= Small spiny rat =

Small spiny rat may refer to several different rat species:

- Maxomys baeodon from Borneo
- Rattus steini from New Guinea
