= Poso horseshoe bat =

Conservation status
- Endangered (IUCN 3.1)

Scientific classification
- Domain: Eukaryota
- Kingdom: Animalia
- Phylum: Chordata
- Class: Mammalia
- Order: Chiroptera
- Family: Rhinolophidae
- Genus: Rhinolophus
- Species: R. belligerator

Binomial name
- Rhinolophus belligerator Patrick, McCulloch, Ruedas, 2013

Species of bat

The Poso horseshoe bat or belligerent horseshoe bat (Rhinolophus belligerator) is an endangered species of horseshoe bat found only on Sulawesi Island, which is part of Indonesia.

== Taxonomy and etymology ==
The single known specimen was described in 1988 by British bat specialist John Edwards Hill and identified as the arcuate horseshoe bat (Rhinolophus arcuatus). Hill wrote that the bat was most similar to the subspecies Rhinolophus arcuatus proconsulis, which is otherwise known only from Borneo. A 2013 review of the R. arcuatus group identified the Sulawesi specimen as representing a new species, which they named Rhinolophus belligerator. The new species name belligerator is from the Latin word belligerans, meaning "belligerent combatant". This unusual species name for a bat was suggested because "the specimen originates in an area where a long-running and senseless Muslim–Christian civil war has been going on for many years" (see Poso riots).

== Range and habitat ==
The single known specimen was discovered in Permana Cave, which is near Poso, Central Sulawesi.

== Conservation ==
It is currently evaluated as endangered by the IUCN. It meets the criteria for this designation because its extent of occurrence is estimated at 1,742 km^{2} (673 sq mi), it is found at only one location, and only one individual has ever been documented.
