= Bornean woolly horseshoe bat =

Conservation status
- Endangered (IUCN 3.1)

Scientific classification
- Kingdom: Animalia
- Phylum: Chordata
- Class: Mammalia
- Order: Chiroptera
- Family: Rhinolophidae
- Genus: Rhinolophus
- Species: R. proconsulis

Binomial name
- Rhinolophus proconsulis Hill, 1959

Synonyms
- R. arcuatus proconsulis Hill, 1959

Species of bat

The Bornean woolly horseshoe bat or Proconsul's horseshoe bat (Rhinolophus proconsulis) is an endangered species of horseshoe bat found on Borneo. Though it was discovered in 1959, it was not recognized as a distinct species until 2013.

== Taxonomy and etymology ==
This bat was initially described in 1959 from specimens in Borneo as a subspecies of the arcuate horseshoe bat and given the name Rhinolophus arcuatus proconsulis. The author of the 1959 paper, British mammalogist John Edwards Hill, stated that the subspecies was similar in appearance to R. arcuatus, with the exception of its larger body and skull size. Hill later published that a population of R. a. proconsulis was on Sulawesi as well. Authors of a 2013 paper determined that the two populations of R. a. proconsulis on Borneo and Sulawesi were each cryptic species.

They elevated the Borneo population to species rank, R. proconsulis, on the basis of morphological data. The Sulawesi "R. a. procunsulis" was also elevated to species rank in the 2013 paper; it is now called Rhinolophus belligerator. Like the arcuate horseshoe bat, R. proconsulis is placed in the euryotis species group of the horseshoe bat genus.

Its species name proconsulis is derived from Latin "proconsul", meaning "a man who became governor of a province or a military commander following a term as consul." Hill chose this species name "in honour of the Office of H.M. Governor of the Colony of Sarawak, which, having succeeded the hereditary Rajahs, often honoured in this way, has not as far as I am aware yet inspired such a name."

== Description ==
The fur on its back is dark brown; the bases of the hairs on the back are grayish. Fur on the ventral surface is pale brown. Its forearm is 46.8–48.3 mm (1.84–1.90 in) long. Its horseshoe is 9.3–9.7 mm (0.37–0.38 in) long.

== Range and habitat ==
It is known from nine localities in three locations. It has been documented in six caves in Sarawak, Malaysia, two sites in Central Kalimantan, Indonesia, and one site in East Kalimantan, Indonesia. During the day, it roosts in limestone caves. As a cave dweller, it differs ecologically from its relative Rhinolophus arcuatus, which lives in forests.

== Conservation ==
It is currently evaluated as endangered by the IUCN. Caves in Borneo are threatened by disturbance via guano mining, ecotourism, and collecting nests of edible-nest swiftlets. Palm oil plantations and cocoa plantations are resulting in the loss of foraging habitat for insectivorous bats.
