= Bornean whiskered myotis =

Conservation status
- Data Deficient (IUCN 3.1)

Scientific classification
- Kingdom: Animalia
- Phylum: Chordata
- Class: Mammalia
- Order: Chiroptera
- Family: Vespertilionidae
- Genus: Myotis
- Species: M. borneoensis

Binomial name
- Myotis borneoensis Hill and Francis, 1984
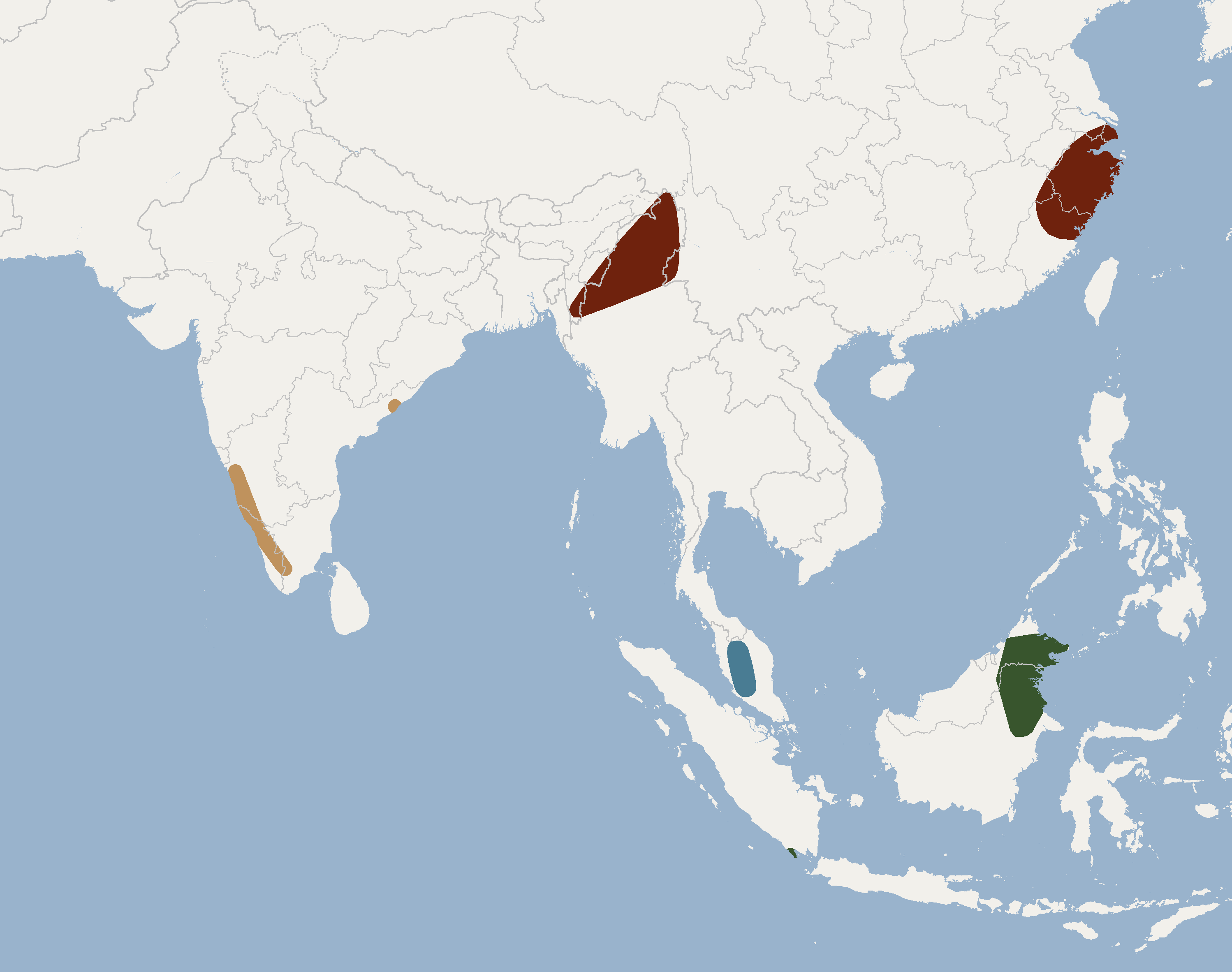
- Bornean whiskered myotis range in green

Species of vesper bat

The Bornean whiskered myotis (Myotis borneoensis) is a species of vesper bat endemic to Borneo.

== Taxonomy ==
It was described in 1984 by John Edwards Hill and Charles M. Francis as a subspecies of the Burmese whiskered bat (M. montivagus). However, a 2013 study reclassified it as a distinct species on morphological grounds, using cranial and dental features. This has also been followed by the American Society of Mammalogists, the IUCN Red List, and the ITIS.

== Distribution ==
It is only known from northeastern Borneo, where it is found in both the Indonesian state of Kalimantan and the Malaysian states of Sabah and Sarawak.

== Status ==
This species may be a cave-dweller, and thus may be at risk of disturbance from caving. As it is known to inhabit tall forests, it may also be at risk from deforestation. However, very little information is known about this species, and it is thus classified as Data Deficient on the IUCN Red List.
