= Peyton's myotis =

Conservation status
- Data Deficient (IUCN 3.1)

Scientific classification
- Kingdom: Animalia
- Phylum: Chordata
- Class: Mammalia
- Infraclass: Placentalia
- Order: Chiroptera
- Family: Vespertilionidae
- Genus: Myotis
- Species: M. peytoni

Binomial name
- Myotis peytoni Wroughton & Ryley, 1913
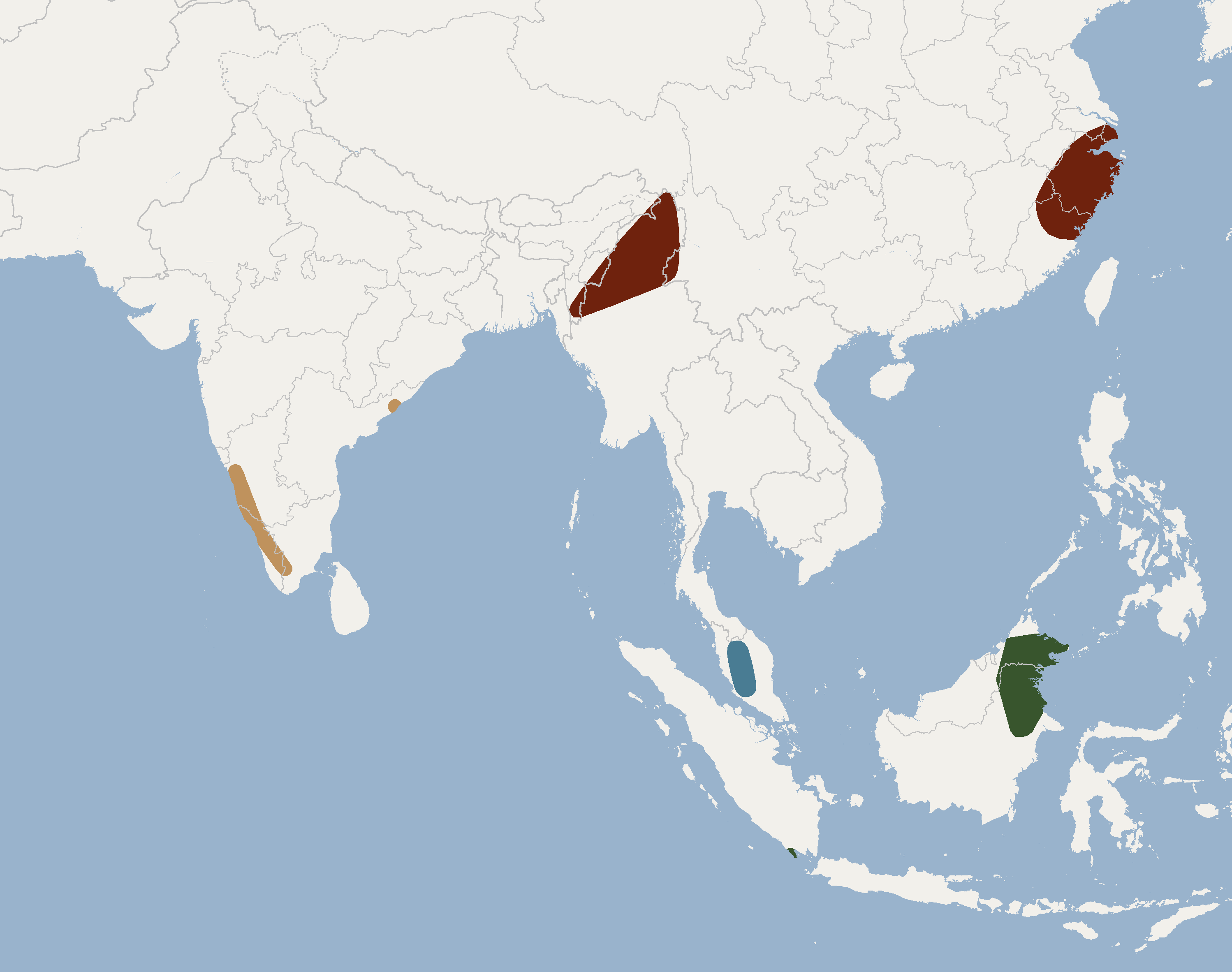
- Peyton's myotis range in yellow (underestimation of the actual range extent)

Synonyms
- Myotis montivagus peytoni

Species of vesper bat

Peyton's myotis (Myotis peytoni), also known as Peyton's whiskered bat, is a species of vesper bat endemic to India.

== Taxonomy ==
It was described in 1913, and was generally considered a subspecies of the Burmese whiskered bat (M. montivagus) for about a century. However, a 2013 study reclassified it as a distinct species on morphological grounds, using cranial and dental features. This has also been followed by the American Society of Mammalogists, the IUCN Red List, and the ITIS.

== Distribution and habitat ==
It is restricted to peninsular India, where it ranges from the vicinity of Vishakhapatnam west to the Karnataka coast, and as far south as inland Tamil Nadu. It has also been recorded in Bangladesh, around 2,000 km north of its previously known range. It is thought to inhabit lowland tropical forests. In 1913, individuals of M. peytoni were recorded swarming among the rocky crevices of Jog Falls, and this was also the type locality of the species.

== Status ==
This species may potentially be a cave-dweller, so it may be threatened by caving. In addition, as it is known to inhabit tall forests, it may be threatened by deforestation. However, very little information is known about this species, and it is thus classified as Data Deficient on the IUCN Red List.
