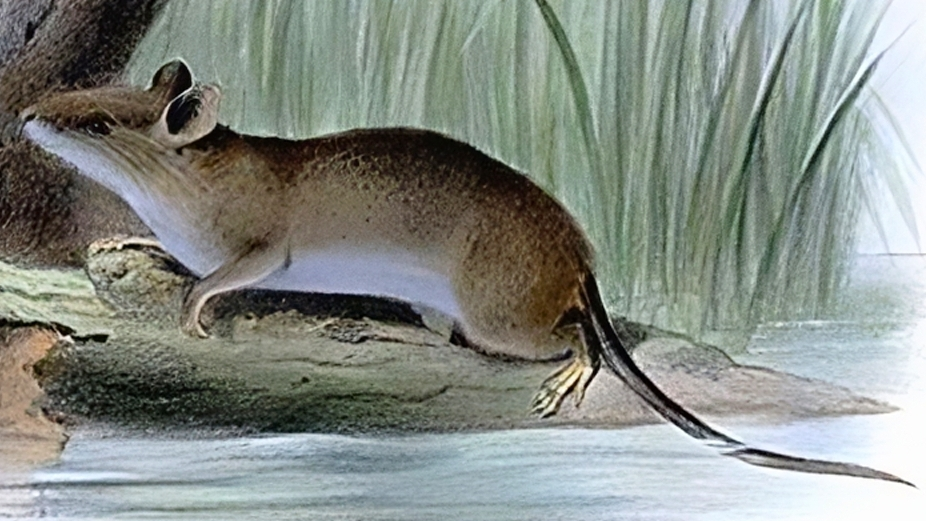

Conservation status
- Data Deficient (IUCN 3.1)

Scientific classification
- Kingdom: Animalia
- Phylum: Chordata
- Class: Mammalia
- Order: Rodentia
- Family: Muridae
- Genus: Crunomys
- Species: C. fallax

Binomial name
- Crunomys fallax Thomas, 1897
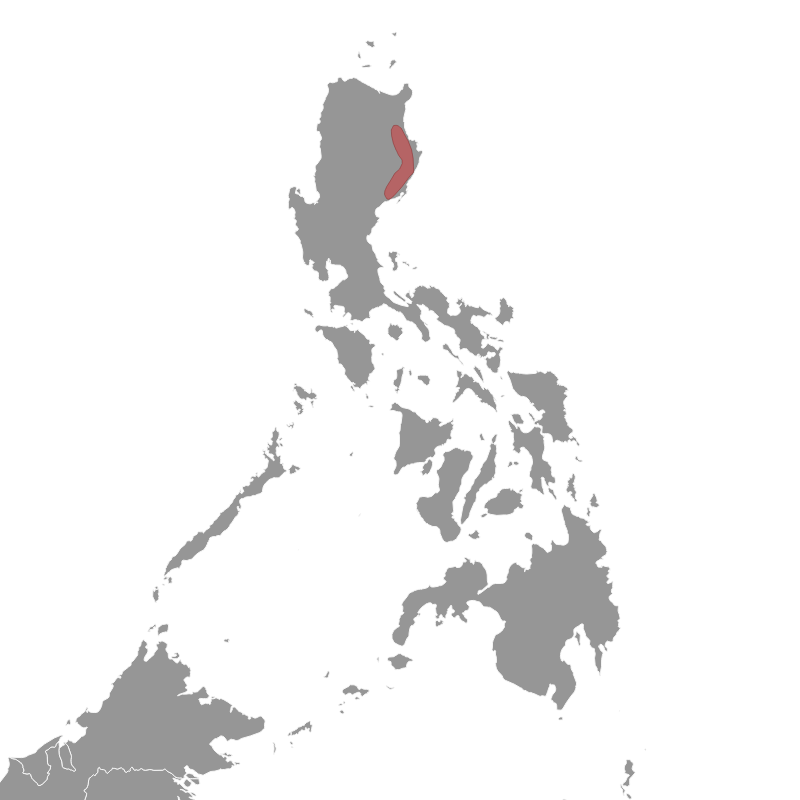

= Northern Luzon shrew-rat =

Species of rodent

The Northern Luzon shrew-rat (Crunomys fallax) is a species of rodent in the family Muridae. It is found only in the Philippines. Its natural habitat is subtropical or tropical dry forest. It is threatened by habitat loss.
