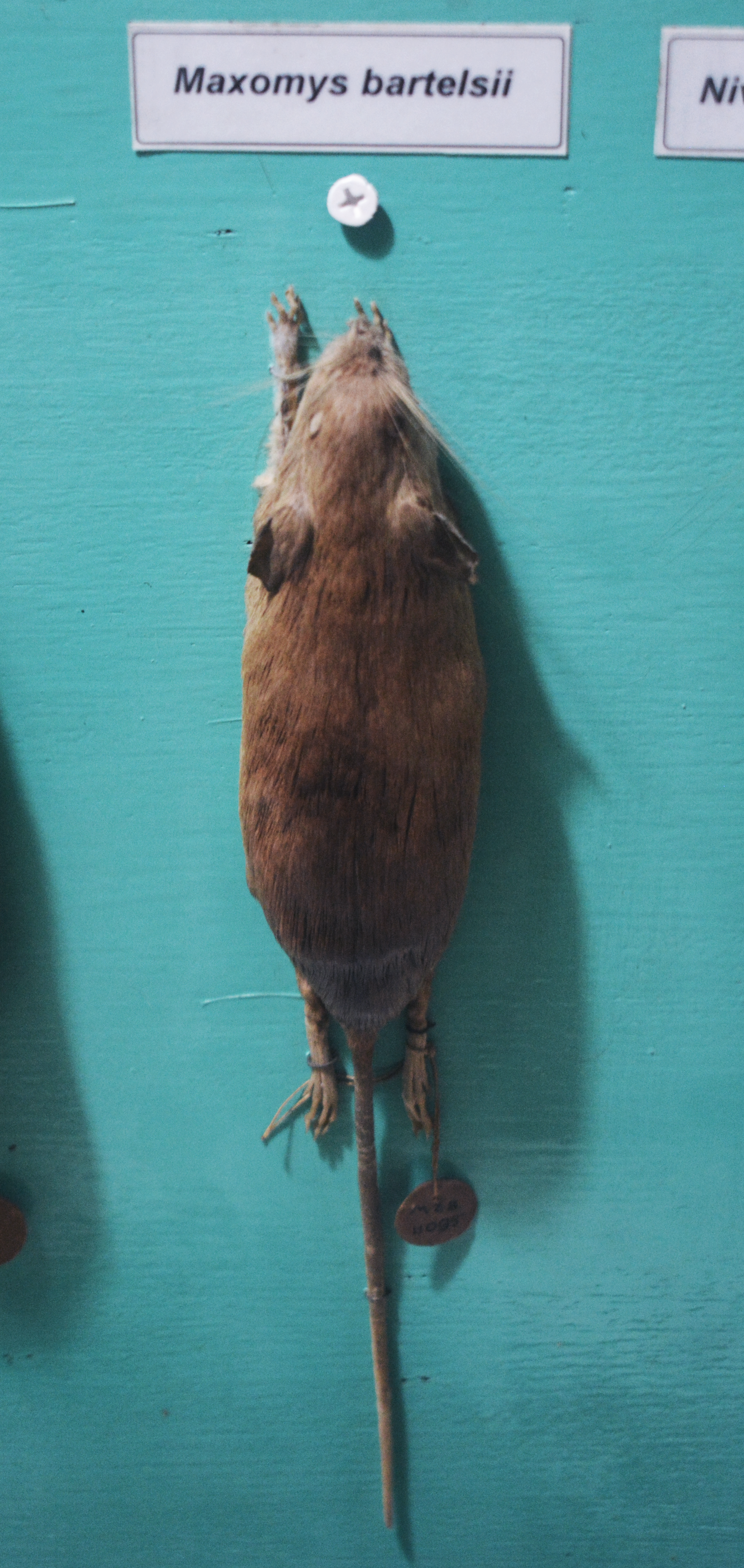
- Specimen at the Bogor Zoology Museum

Conservation status
- Least Concern (IUCN 3.1)

Scientific classification
- Kingdom: Animalia
- Phylum: Chordata
- Class: Mammalia
- Order: Rodentia
- Family: Muridae
- Genus: Maxomys
- Species: M. bartelsii

Binomial name
- Maxomys bartelsii (Jentink, 1910)

= Bartels's spiny rat =

Species of rodent

Bartels's spiny rat (Maxomys bartelsii) is a species of rodent in the family Muridae. It is found only in Indonesia. This species is indigenous to the volcano forests of west and central Java, the main island of Indonesia. The species is able to tolerate moderate disturbance and can be found at the edge of the forests as well.
