= Maxomys tajuddinii =

Conservation status
- Least Concern (IUCN 3.1)

Scientific classification
- Kingdom: Animalia
- Phylum: Chordata
- Class: Mammalia
- Order: Rodentia
- Family: Muridae
- Genus: Maxomys
- Species: M. tajuddinii

Binomial name
- Maxomys tajuddinii Achmadi, Maryanto & Maharadatunkamsi, 2012

Species of rodent

Maxomys tajuddinii is a species of rodent in the genus Maxomys. It is found in Indonesia and Malaysia. It is a rodent of medium size, with a tail length of 106.9-122.3 mm, feet of 27.62-30.04 mm and a weight of up to 70 g.
