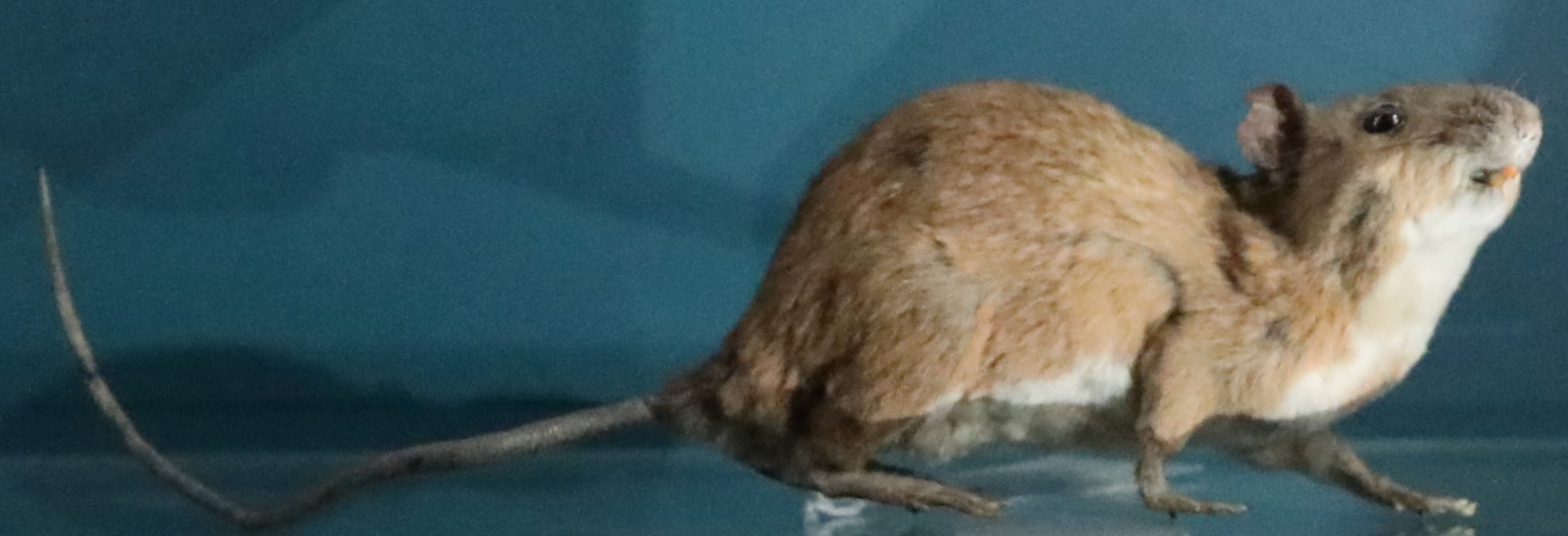
- A taxidermied Maxomys hellwaldii at the Natural History Museum at Tring

Conservation status
- Least Concern (IUCN 3.1)

Scientific classification
- Kingdom: Animalia
- Phylum: Chordata
- Class: Mammalia
- Order: Rodentia
- Family: Muridae
- Genus: Maxomys
- Species: M. hellwaldii

Binomial name
- Maxomys hellwaldii (Jentink, 1878)

= Hellwald's spiny rat =

Species of rodent

Hellwald's spiny rat (Maxomys hellwaldii) is a species of rodent in the family Muridae. It is found only on Sulawesi in Indonesia.
