= Malaysian whiskered myotis =

Conservation status
- Data Deficient (IUCN 3.1)

Scientific classification
- Kingdom: Animalia
- Phylum: Chordata
- Class: Mammalia
- Order: Chiroptera
- Family: Vespertilionidae
- Genus: Myotis
- Species: M. federatus

Binomial name
- Myotis federatus Thomas, 1916
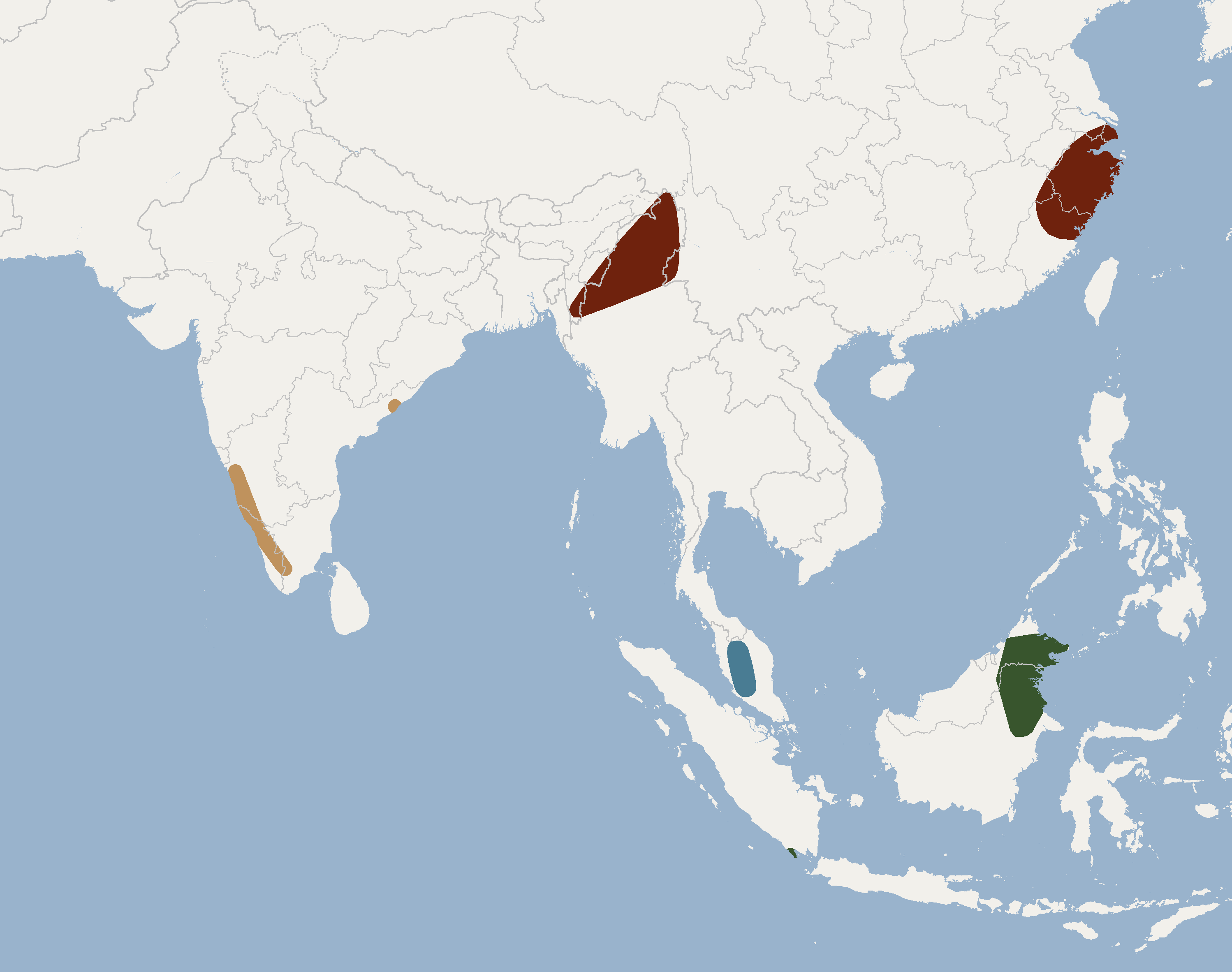
- Malaysian whiskered myotis range in blue

Species of vesper bat

The Malaysian whiskered myotis or Malayan whiskered myotis (Myotis federatus) is a species of vesper bat endemic to Malaysia, although it may possibly also occur in Indonesia.

== Taxonomy ==
It was described in 1916 by Oldfield Thomas as a subspecies of the Burmese whiskered bat (M. montivagus). However, a 2013 study reclassified it as a distinct species on morphological grounds, using cranial and dental features. This has also been followed by the American Society of Mammalogists, the IUCN Red List, and the ITIS.

== Distribution ==
It is only known from Peninsular Malaysia. It is known from a few localities, including the border of Selangor and Pahang, the Genting Highlands, Belum-Temengor, and the Batu Caves. The American Society of Mammalogists also lists it as potentially occurring in Indonesia, although this is yet to be confirmed.

== Status ==
This species may be a cave-dweller, and thus may be at risk of disturbance from caving. As it is known to inhabit tall forests, it may also be at risk from deforestation. However, very little information is known about this species, and it is thus classified as Data Deficient on the IUCN Red List.
