= Musschenbroek's spiny rat =

Conservation status
- Least Concern (IUCN 3.1)

Scientific classification
- Kingdom: Animalia
- Phylum: Chordata
- Class: Mammalia
- Order: Rodentia
- Family: Muridae
- Genus: Maxomys
- Species: M. musschenbroekii

Binomial name
- Maxomys musschenbroekii (Jentink, 1878)

Species of rodent

Musschenbroek's spiny rat (Maxomys musschenbroekii) is a species of rodent in the family Muridae. It is found only in Indonesia.
