= Celebes shrew-rat =

Conservation status
- Data Deficient (IUCN 3.1)

Scientific classification
- Kingdom: Animalia
- Phylum: Chordata
- Class: Mammalia
- Order: Rodentia
- Family: Muridae
- Genus: Crunomys
- Species: C. celebensis

Binomial name
- Crunomys celebensis Musser, 1982

Species of rodent

The Celebes shrew-rat (Crunomys celebensis) is a species of rodent in the family Muridae. It is found only in Sulawesi, Indonesia. Its natural habitat is subtropical or tropical dry forests. It is threatened by habitat loss.
