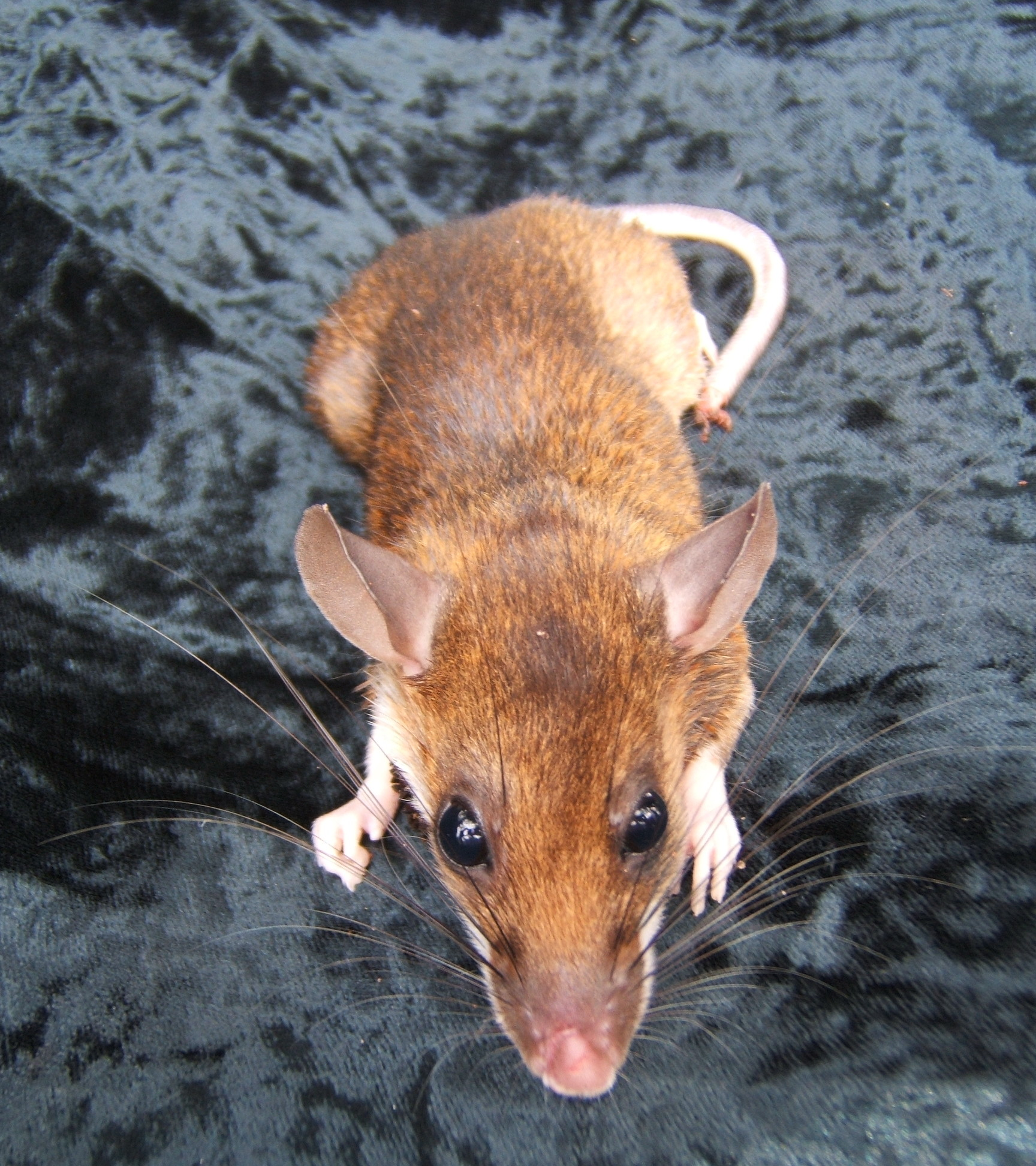
- Red spiny rat (Maxomys surifer)

Scientific classification
- Domain: Eukaryota
- Kingdom: Animalia
- Phylum: Chordata
- Class: Mammalia
- Order: Rodentia
- Family: Muridae
- Tribe: Rattini
- Genus: Maxomys; Sody, 1936

Type species
- Rattus bartelsii Jentink, 1910

Species
- Maxomys alticola Maxomys baeodon Maxomys bartelsii Maxomys dollmani Maxomys hellwaldii Maxomys hylomyoides Maxomys inas Maxomys inflatus Maxomys moi Maxomys musschenbroekii Maxomys ochraceiventer Maxomys pagensis Maxomys panglima Maxomys rajah Maxomys surifer Maxomys tajuddinii Maxomys wattsi Maxomys whiteheadi

= Maxomys =

Maxomys Temporal range: Pleistocene - Recent

Genus of rodents

Maxomys is a genus of rodents, widespread in Southeast Asia. They are mid-sized rodents, similar to rats, that live on the ground of tropical rainforests. There they build nests, padded with fallen leaves from trees. They feed on roots, fallen fruit, and other plants, as well as insects. All species are shy and avoid food from humans.

The genus Maxomys was originally considered a subgenus of Rattus, the rat genus. When it became established as its own genus in the 1960s, Maxomys was often combined with the genera Niviventer and Leopoldamys. In the currently accepted taxonomy, Musser, Marshall, and Boeadi established Maxomys in 1979.

== List of species ==
Genus Maxomys - rajah rats:

- Mountain spiny rat, Maxomys alticola Thomas, 1888, Borneo
- Small spiny rat, Maxomys baeodon Thomas, 1894, Borneo
- Bartels's spiny rat, Maxomys bartelsii Jentink, 1910, Java
- Dollman's spiny rat, Maxomys dollmani Ellerman, 1941, Sulawesi
- Hellwald's spiny rat, Maxomys hellwaldii Jentink, 1878, Sulawesi
- Sumatran spiny rat, Maxomys hylomyoides Robinson and Kloss, 1916, Sumatra
- Malayan mountain spiny rat, Maxomys inas Bonhote, 1906, Malayan Peninsula
- Fat-nosed spiny rat, Maxomys inflatus Robinson and Kloss, 1916, Sumatra
- Mo's spiny rat, Maxomys moi Robinson and Kloss, 1922, Vietnam, Laos
- Musschenbroek's spiny rat, Maxomys musschenbroekii Jentink, 1878, Sulawesi
- Chestnut-bellied spiny rat, Maxomys ochraceiventer Thomas, 1894, Borneo
- Pagai spiny rat, Maxomys pagensis Miller, 1903, Mentawai Islands
- Palawan spiny rat, Maxomys panglima Robinson, 1921, Palawan and neighboring islands
- Rajah spiny rat, Maxomys rajah Thomas, 1894, Malayan Peninsula, Sumatra, Borneo
- Red spiny rat, Maxomys surifer Miller, 1900, Sumatra, Java, Borneo
- Maxomys tajuddinii Achmadi, Maryanto & Maharadatunkamsi, 2012, Malay Peninsula, Sumatra, Borneo
- Watts's spiny rat, Maxomys wattsi Musser, 1991, Sulawesi
- Whitehead's spiny rat, Maxomys whiteheadi Thomas, 1894, Malayan Peninsula, Sumatra, Borneo
