= Mindanao shrew-rat =

Conservation status
- Least Concern (IUCN 3.1)

Scientific classification
- Kingdom: Animalia
- Phylum: Chordata
- Class: Mammalia
- Order: Rodentia
- Family: Muridae
- Genus: Crunomys
- Species: C. melanius

Binomial name
- Crunomys melanius Thomas, 1907
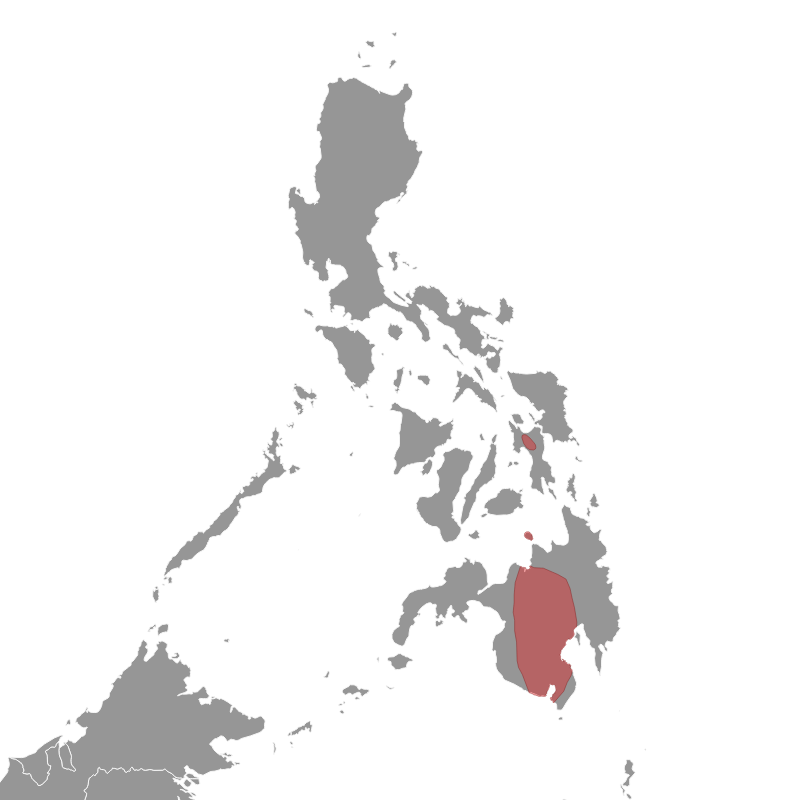

Species of rodent

The Mindanao shrew-rat (Crunomys melanius) is a species of rodent in the family Muridae. It is found only in the Philippines.
