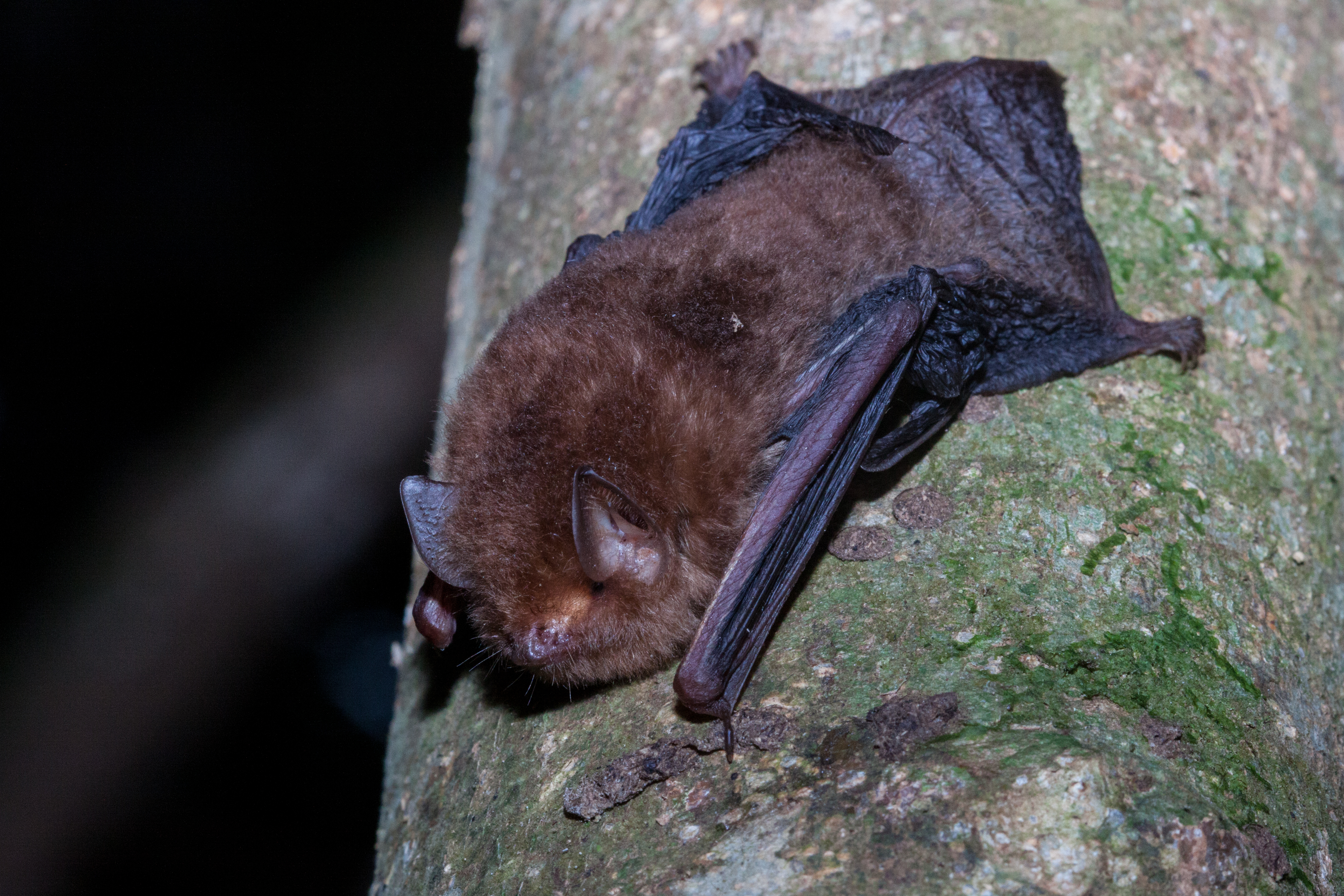

Conservation status
- Near Threatened (IUCN 3.1)

Scientific classification
- Kingdom: Animalia
- Phylum: Chordata
- Class: Mammalia
- Order: Chiroptera
- Family: Vespertilionidae
- Genus: Kerivoula
- Species: K. intermedia

Binomial name
- Kerivoula intermedia Hill & Francis, 1984

= Small woolly bat =

Species of bat

The small woolly bat (Kerivoula intermedia) is a species of vesper bat in the family Vespertilionidae. It is found only in Malaysia and is little known. It is only slightly larger than the Kitti's hog-nosed bat, one of the smallest mammals in the world. The small woolly bat weighs 2.5 to 4 g (0.088 to 0.141 oz).

== Description ==
The head-and-body length is 30–40 mm (1.2–1.6 in), the tail length is 24–42 mm (0.94–1.65 in) and the forearm length is 27–31 cm (11–12 in). The fur is orange-brown on the dorsal side, and a paler brown color on the ventral side of the bat. Both the base of the fur hairs as well as the wing membrane are dark in color. This bat is very similar in appearance to Kerivoula minuta, with the two species only being able to be distinguished morphologically by their weight, as their forearms overlap. Kerivoula intermedia is thought to always weigh over 2.5g, with Kerivoula minuta weighing 1.9-2.5g.

== Biology ==
Breeding usually occurs from February to May, with a shorter breeding season happening between August and October.
