= Palawan spiny rat =

Conservation status
- Least Concern (IUCN 3.1)

Scientific classification
- Kingdom: Animalia
- Phylum: Chordata
- Class: Mammalia
- Order: Rodentia
- Family: Muridae
- Genus: Maxomys
- Species: M. panglima

Binomial name
- Maxomys panglima (Robinson, 1921)
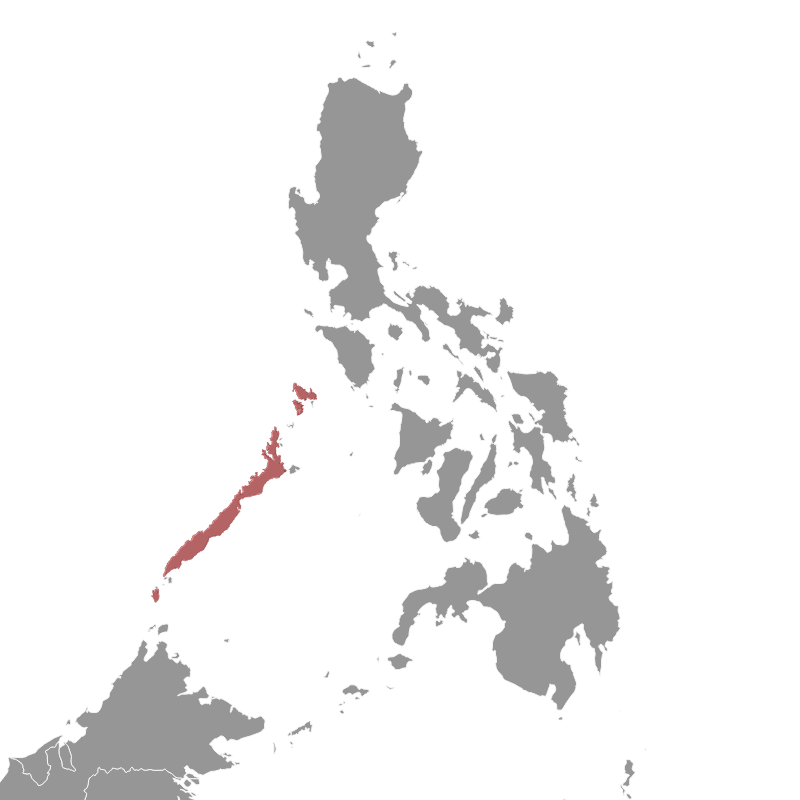

Species of rodent

The Palawan spiny rat (Maxomys panglima) is a species of rodent in the family Muridae. It is found only in the Philippines.
