= Dollman's spiny rat =

Conservation status
- Data Deficient (IUCN 3.1)

Scientific classification
- Kingdom: Animalia
- Phylum: Chordata
- Class: Mammalia
- Order: Rodentia
- Family: Muridae
- Genus: Maxomys
- Species: M. dollmani

Binomial name
- Maxomys dollmani (Ellerman, 1941)

Species of rodent

Dollman's spiny rat or Dollman's Sulawesi Maxomys (Maxomys dollmani) is a species of rodent in the family Muridae. It is found only on Sulawesi.
