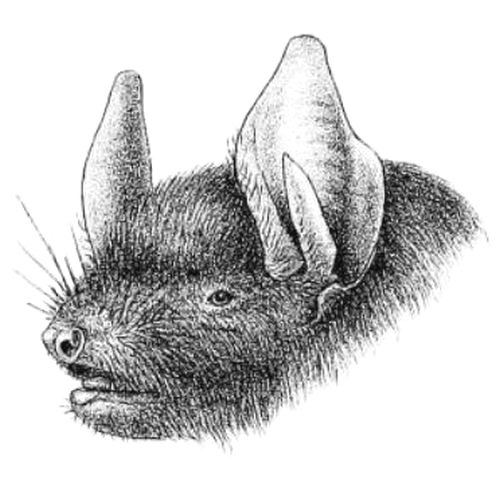

Conservation status
- Data Deficient (IUCN 3.1)

Scientific classification
- Kingdom: Animalia
- Phylum: Chordata
- Class: Mammalia
- Order: Chiroptera
- Family: Vespertilionidae
- Genus: Myotis
- Species: M. montivagus

Binomial name
- Myotis montivagus (Dobson, 1874)
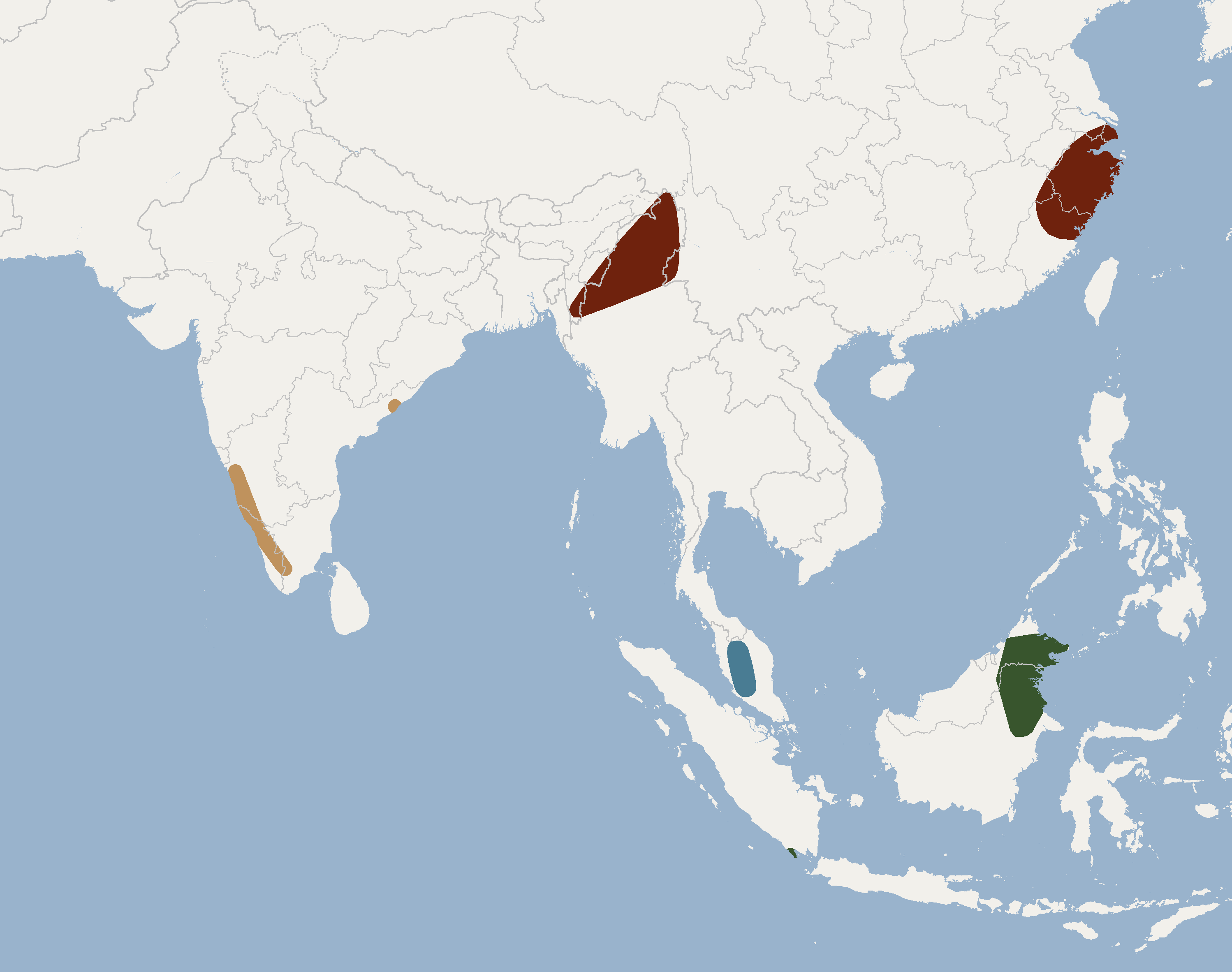
- Burmese whiskered myotis range in red (eastern Chinese range likely erroneous)

= Burmese whiskered myotis =

Species of bat

The Burmese whiskered myotis or Burmese whiskered bat (Myotis montivagus) is a species of vesper bat. It is found in China, India, Myanmar, Laos, and Vietnam.

== Taxonomy ==
It was previously thought to have a wider range across Asia, ranging west into peninsular India and as far east as Borneo. However, a 2013 study found significant cranial and dental differences between different populations of the species, and thus split it into several distinct species: the Burmese whiskered myotis (M. montivagus sensu stricto), Peyton's myotis (M. peytoni, endemic to India), the Malaysian whiskered myotis (M. federatus, endemic to Peninsular Malaysia), and the Bornean whiskered myotis (M. borneoensis, endemic to Borneo). This has also been followed by the American Society of Mammalogists, the IUCN Red List, and the ITIS.

== Distribution and habitat ==
It ranges from northeastern India north to southern China and south to northern Myanmar. An isolated population (not considered part of M. montivagus by the American Society of Mammalogists) is known from Laos and Vietnam. It is thought to inhabit tropical montane forest for most of its range, although in Vietnam it is also known from lowland habitats, including agricultural fields.

== Status ==
Very little information is known about this species, and it is thus classified as Data Deficient on the IUCN Red List. It may be threatened by the loss or degradation of cave and forest habitats.
