= Mo's spiny rat =

Conservation status
- Least Concern (IUCN 3.1)

Scientific classification
- Kingdom: Animalia
- Phylum: Chordata
- Class: Mammalia
- Order: Rodentia
- Family: Muridae
- Genus: Maxomys
- Species: M. moi

Binomial name
- Maxomys moi (Robinson & Kloss, 1922)
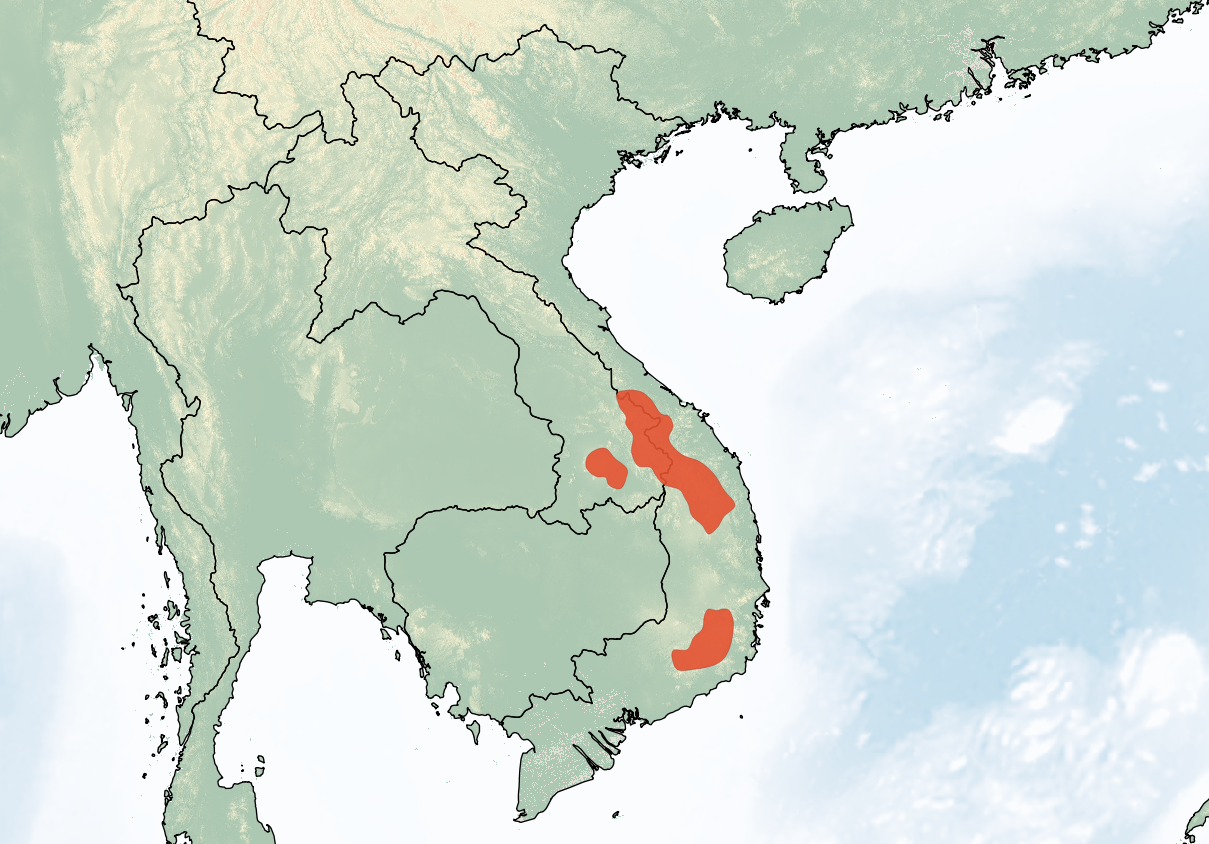

Species of rodent

Mo's spiny rat (Maxomys moi) is a species of rodent in the family Muridae. It is found in Laos and Vietnam.
