= Watts's spiny rat =

Conservation status
- Endangered (IUCN 3.1)

Scientific classification
- Kingdom: Animalia
- Phylum: Chordata
- Class: Mammalia
- Order: Rodentia
- Family: Muridae
- Genus: Maxomys
- Species: M. wattsi

Binomial name
- Maxomys wattsi Musser, 1991

Species of rodent

Watts's spiny rat (Maxomys wattsi) is a species of rodent in the family Muridae.

It is endemic to Sulawesi, Indonesia.
