= Malayan mountain spiny rat =

Conservation status
- Least Concern (IUCN 3.1)

Scientific classification
- Kingdom: Animalia
- Phylum: Chordata
- Class: Mammalia
- Order: Rodentia
- Family: Muridae
- Genus: Maxomys
- Species: M. inas

Binomial name
- Maxomys inas (Bonhote, 1906)

Species of rodent

The Malayan mountain spiny rat (Maxomys inas) is a species of rodent in the family Muridae. It is found only in Malaysia.
