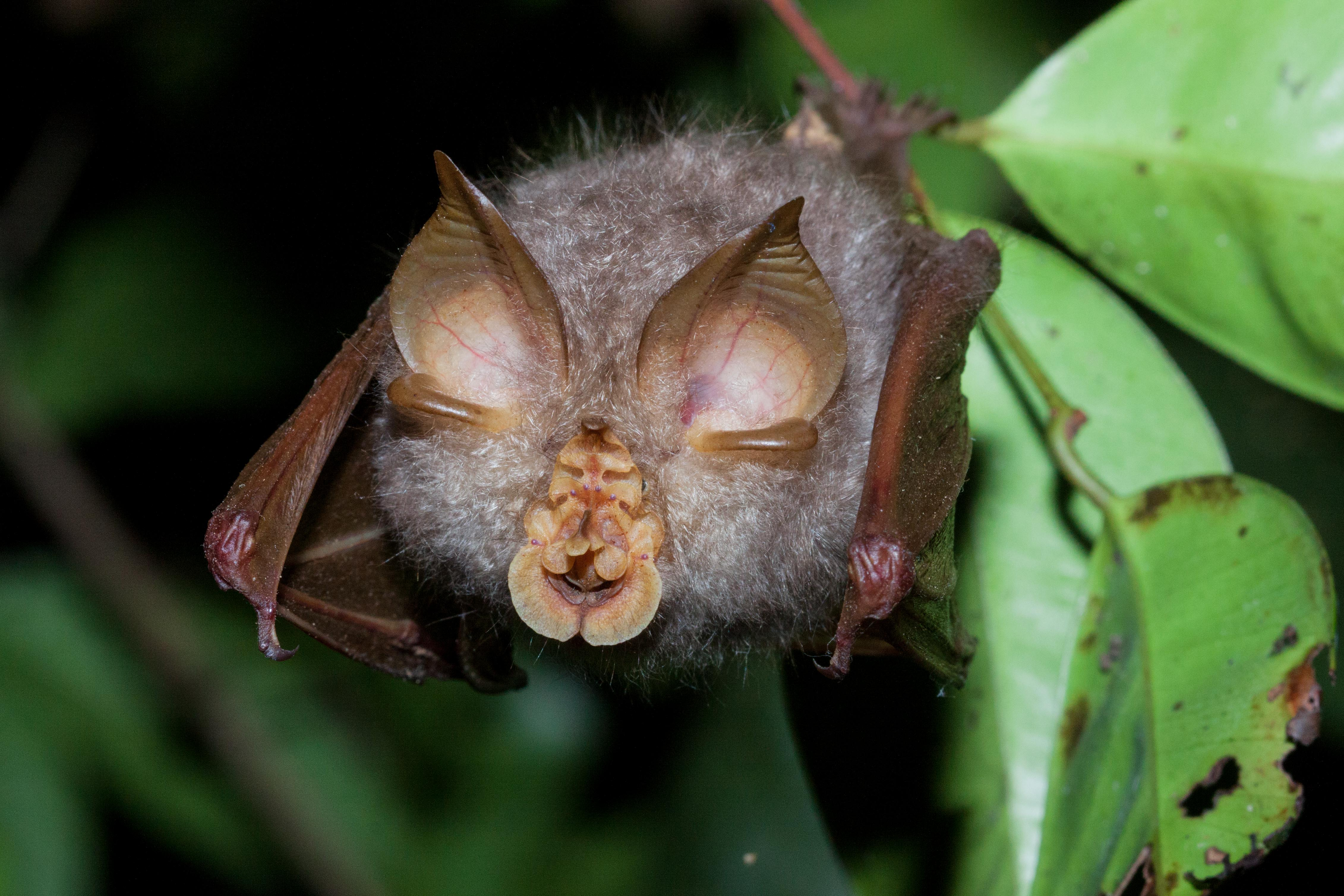

Conservation status
- Near Threatened (IUCN 3.1)

Scientific classification
- Kingdom: Animalia
- Phylum: Chordata
- Class: Mammalia
- Order: Chiroptera
- Family: Rhinolophidae
- Genus: Rhinolophus
- Species: R. trifoliatus

Binomial name
- Rhinolophus trifoliatus Temminck, 1834
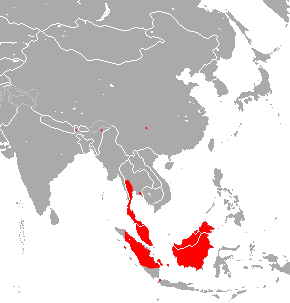
- Trefoil horseshoe bat range

= Trefoil horseshoe bat =

Species of bat

The trefoil horseshoe bat (Rhinolophus trifoliatus) is a species of bat in the family Rhinolophidae. It is found in Brunei, India, Indonesia, Malaysia, Myanmar, Singapore, and Thailand. In Borneo locally common up to 1,800m, including mangroves.

== Description ==
Rhinolophus trifoliatus is a medium-sized horseshoe bat with a forearm length of 47–52 mm (1.9–2.0 in) and weight of 10.5–18 g (0.37–0.63 oz). This bat has fluffy, pale grey fur, with a yellow nose-leaf and ear membranes.

== Ecology and behaviour ==
R. trifoliatus is caught in the understory of primary and secondary rainforest. This species is thought to be solitary, with individuals observed roosting underneath exposed leaves. As with the neotropical Honduran white bat it is thought that their pale fur may be an adaptation to make them camouflaged when roosting, as sunlight filtering through the leaf will make them appear green.
