= Ridley's bat =

Conservation status
- Near Threatened (IUCN 3.1)

Scientific classification
- Kingdom: Animalia
- Phylum: Chordata
- Class: Mammalia
- Order: Chiroptera
- Family: Vespertilionidae
- Genus: Myotis
- Species: M. ridleyi

Binomial name
- Myotis ridleyi Thomas, 1898
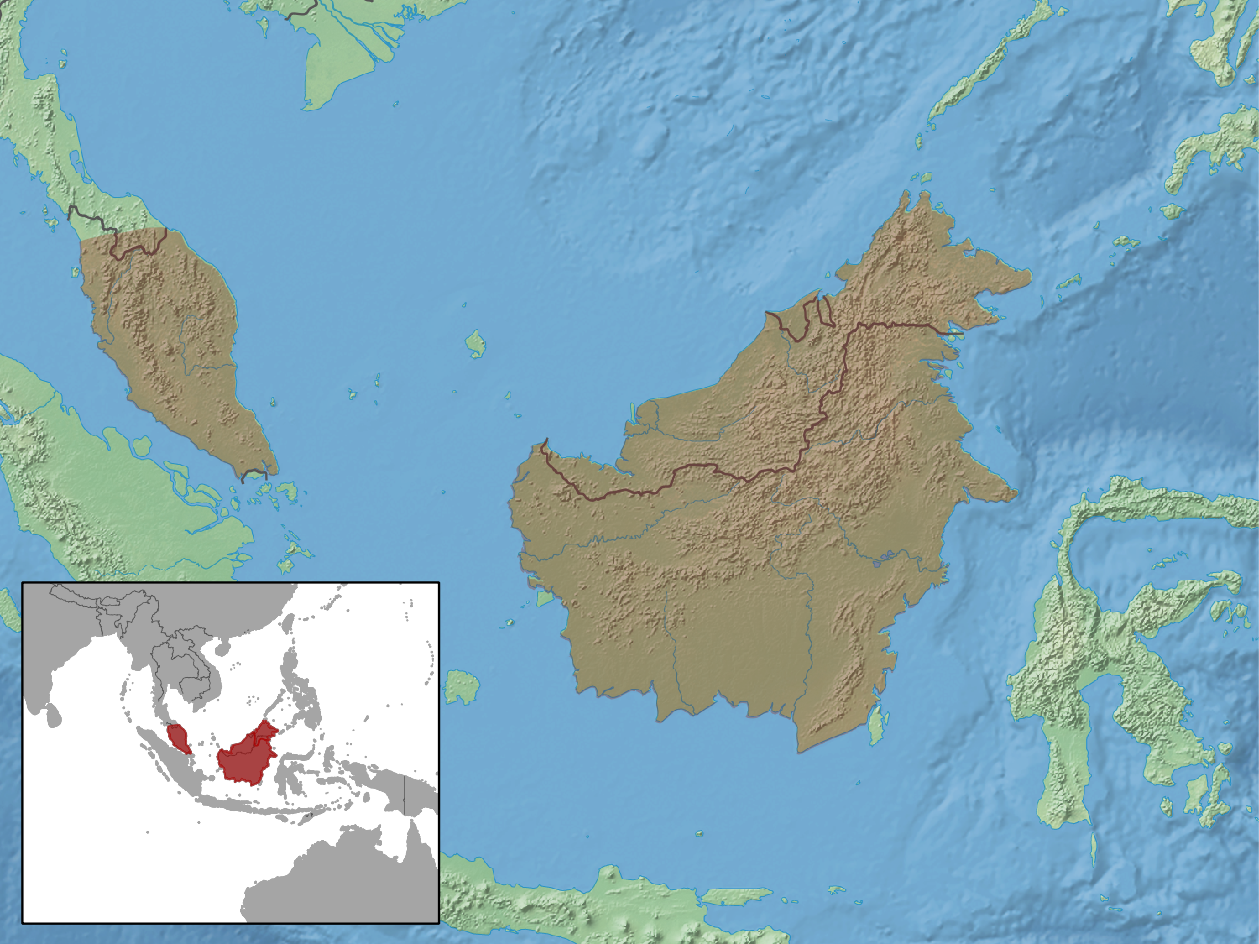

Species of bat

Ridley's bat (Myotis ridleyi) is a species of vesper bat. It is found in Indonesia and Malaysia.
