= Lesser large-footed bat =

Conservation status
- Least Concern (IUCN 3.1)

Scientific classification
- Kingdom: Animalia
- Phylum: Chordata
- Class: Mammalia
- Order: Chiroptera
- Family: Vespertilionidae
- Genus: Myotis
- Species: M. hasseltii

Binomial name
- Myotis hasseltii Temminck, 1840
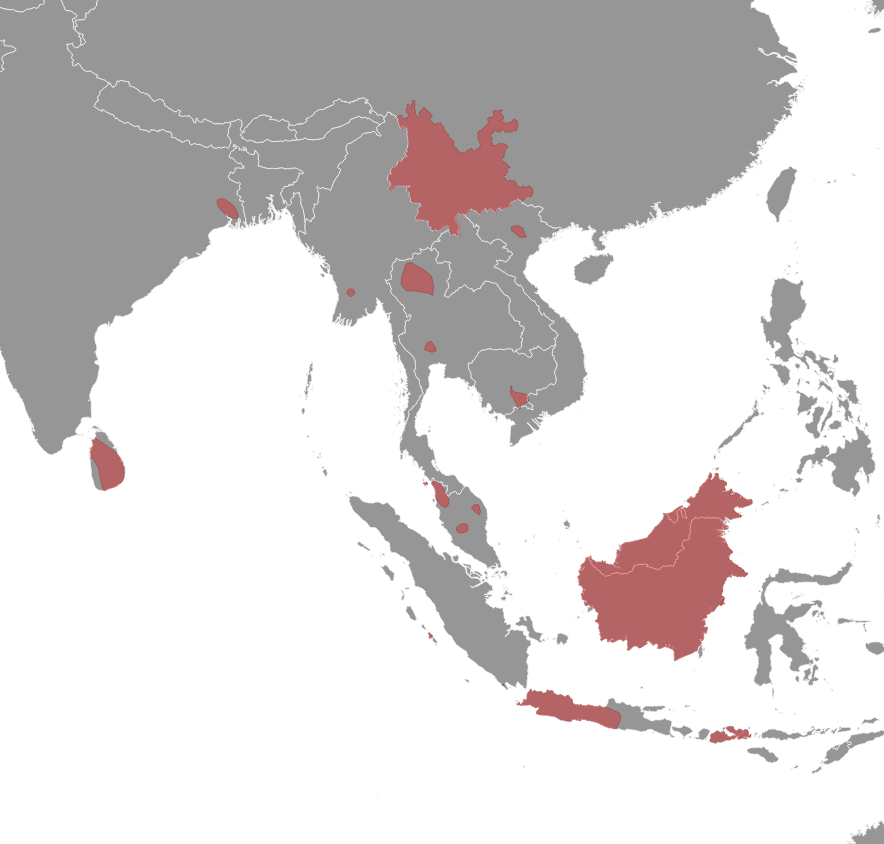

Species of bat

The lesser large-footed bat (Myotis hasseltii) is a species of vesper bat. It can be found in Cambodia, India, Indonesia, Malaysia, Myanmar, Sri Lanka, Thailand, and Vietnam.
