= Pagai spiny rat =

Conservation status
- Vulnerable (IUCN 3.1)

Scientific classification
- Kingdom: Animalia
- Phylum: Chordata
- Class: Mammalia
- Order: Rodentia
- Family: Muridae
- Genus: Maxomys
- Species: M. pagensis

Binomial name
- Maxomys pagensis (Miller, 1903)

Species of rodent

The Pagai spiny rat (Maxomys pagensis) is a species of rodent in the family Muridae. It is found only in the Mentawai Islands of Indonesia, on South Pagai, North Pagai, Sipora, and Siberut islands.
