= Sumatran spiny rat =

Conservation status
- Data Deficient (IUCN 3.1)

Scientific classification
- Kingdom: Animalia
- Phylum: Chordata
- Class: Mammalia
- Order: Rodentia
- Family: Muridae
- Genus: Maxomys
- Species: M. hylomyoides

Binomial name
- Maxomys hylomyoides (Robinson & Kloss, 1916)

Species of rodent

The Sumatran spiny rat (Maxomys hylomyoides) is a species of rodent in the family Muridae. It is only found on the island of Sumatra in Indonesia.
