= Fat-nosed spiny rat =

Conservation status
- Vulnerable (IUCN 3.1)

Scientific classification
- Kingdom: Animalia
- Phylum: Chordata
- Class: Mammalia
- Order: Rodentia
- Family: Muridae
- Genus: Maxomys
- Species: M. inflatus

Binomial name
- Maxomys inflatus (Robinson & Kloss, 1916)

Species of rodent

The fat-nosed spiny rat (Maxomys inflatus) is a species of rodent in the family Muridae. It is found only in Indonesia.
