= Rajah spiny rat =

Conservation status
- Vulnerable (IUCN 3.1)

Scientific classification
- Kingdom: Animalia
- Phylum: Chordata
- Class: Mammalia
- Infraclass: Placentalia
- Order: Rodentia
- Family: Muridae
- Genus: Maxomys
- Species: M. rajah

Binomial name
- Maxomys rajah (Thomas, 1894)
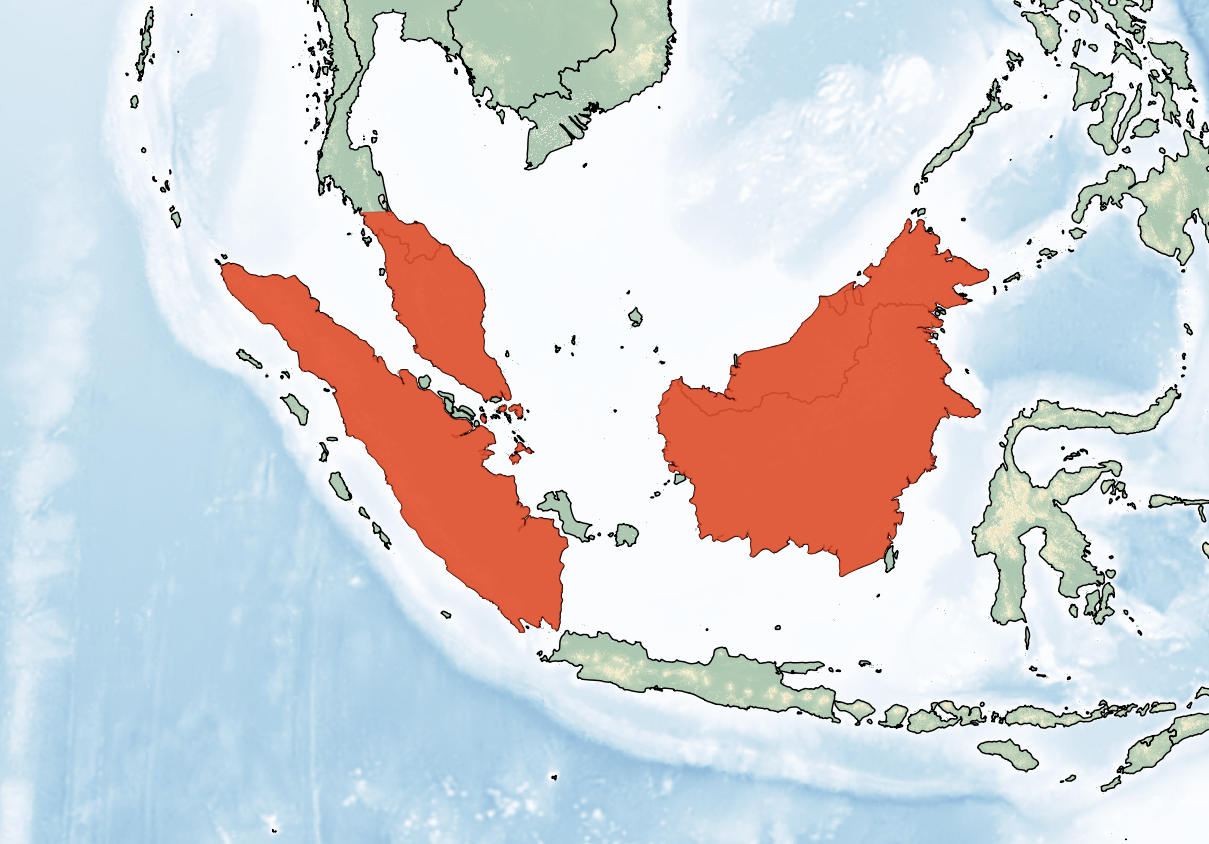

Species of rodent

The Rajah spiny rat (Maxomys rajah), also known as the brown spiny rat, is endemic to Thailand and Malaysia, Sumatra, Borneo, and adjacent islands (Payne et al., 1985).

== Distribution and ecology ==
Corbet and Hill (1992) mention that Maxomys rats are often the most common rodent in the Southeast Asian tropical forest, from most of the Malay Archipelago to Sulawesi, Palawan and Borneo. This species can be found in primary forest and logged-over forest. According to Payne et al. (1985) this species lives in primary or secondary forest and tends to favour sandy and lowland sites. This terrestrial species is mostly active on the ground but occasionally climbs into the upper canopy. Its tend to live separately from other rats.

M.rajah is a common species but Yasuda et al. (2000) reported that very little is known about the ecological features of Maxomys rats.

== Morphology ==
M. rajah is medium in size where the upperparts are brown, darker in the midline, with numerous stiff gray-brown spines. The underparts are white with many short, white spines, and usually with a dark brown streak along the middle in adults, but never with an orange throat patch. The white color of the underparts extend down in a narrow line to the feet. Above the tail is brown, pale below and thinly haired. Usually, the range of the measurement of M. rajah are HB 138.1-218, T 142–210, T/HB = 102.9-109.3%, HF 33.8-43, E 21.9-22.3, Wt 71-218 g, D 1003/1003=16, M 2+2=8. Skull: gl 40.9-48.6, iob 6.6-7.4, mt 6.9-8.1. The immature Red Spiny Rats, M. surifer is similar M. rajah and quite difficult to distinguish. (Payne et al., 1985).
