= Least woolly bat =

Conservation status
- Near Threatened (IUCN 3.1)

Scientific classification
- Kingdom: Animalia
- Phylum: Chordata
- Class: Mammalia
- Order: Chiroptera
- Family: Vespertilionidae
- Genus: Kerivoula
- Species: K. minuta

Binomial name
- Kerivoula minuta Miller, 1898
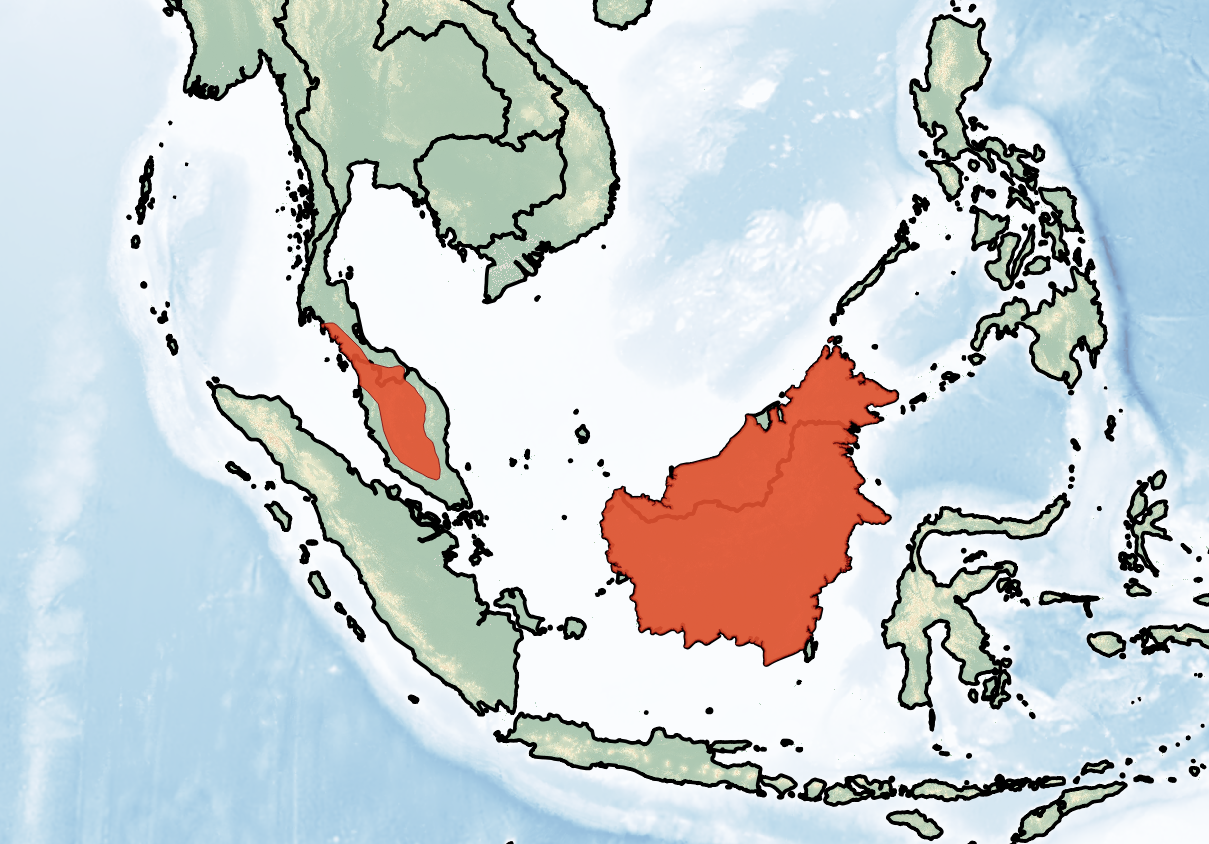

Species of bat

The least woolly bat (Kerivoula minuta) is a species of vesper bat in the family Vespertilionidae. It is found in Indonesia, Malaysia, and possibly Thailand. Its size is 2–3 cm (1 in), plus 2–5 cm (1–2 in) tail and 3–4 cm (1–2 in) forearm length.
