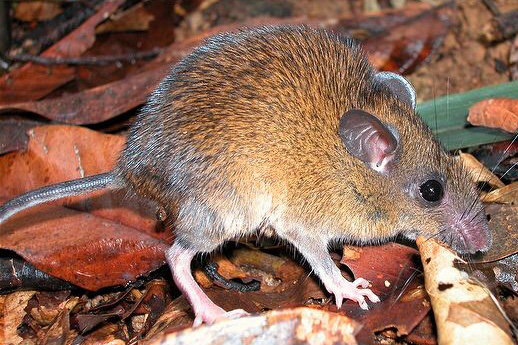

Conservation status
- Vulnerable (IUCN 3.1)

Scientific classification
- Kingdom: Animalia
- Phylum: Chordata
- Class: Mammalia
- Infraclass: Placentalia
- Order: Rodentia
- Family: Muridae
- Genus: Maxomys
- Species: M. whiteheadi

Binomial name
- Maxomys whiteheadi (Thomas, 1894)
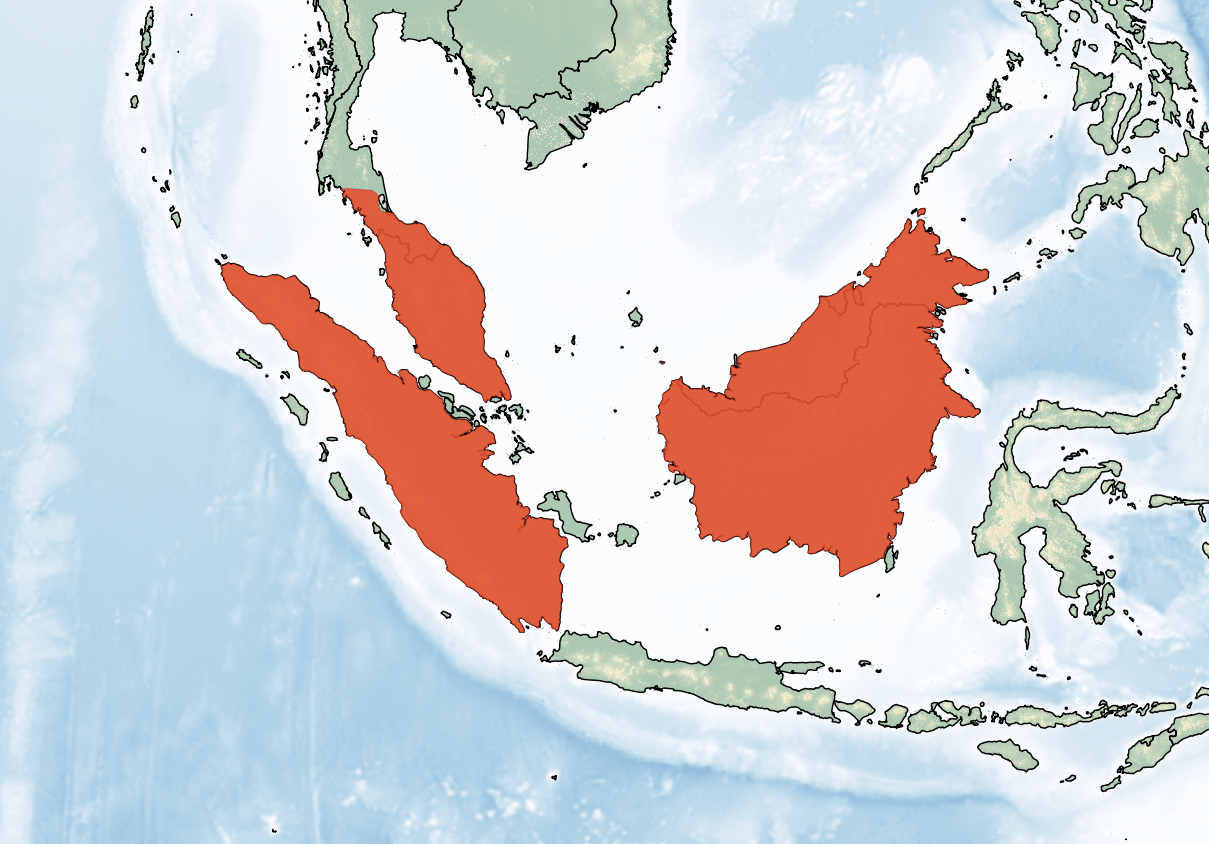

= Whitehead's spiny rat =

Species of rodent

Whitehead's spiny rat (Maxomys whiteheadi) is a species of rodent in the family Muridae. It is found in Indonesia, Malaysia, and Thailand.
