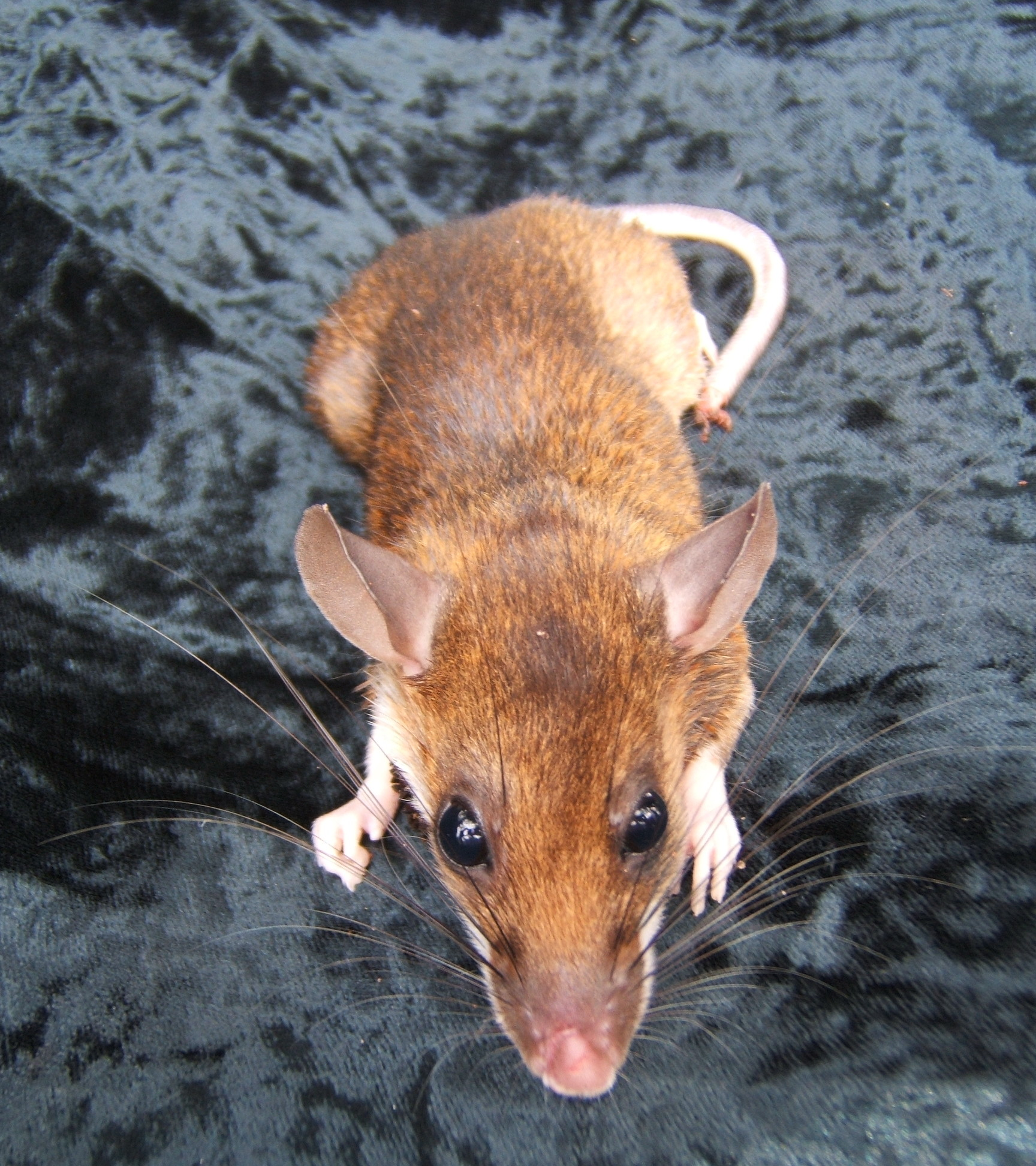

Conservation status
- Least Concern (IUCN 3.1)

Scientific classification
- Kingdom: Animalia
- Phylum: Chordata
- Class: Mammalia
- Order: Rodentia
- Family: Muridae
- Genus: Maxomys
- Species: M. surifer

Binomial name
- Maxomys surifer (Miller, 1900)
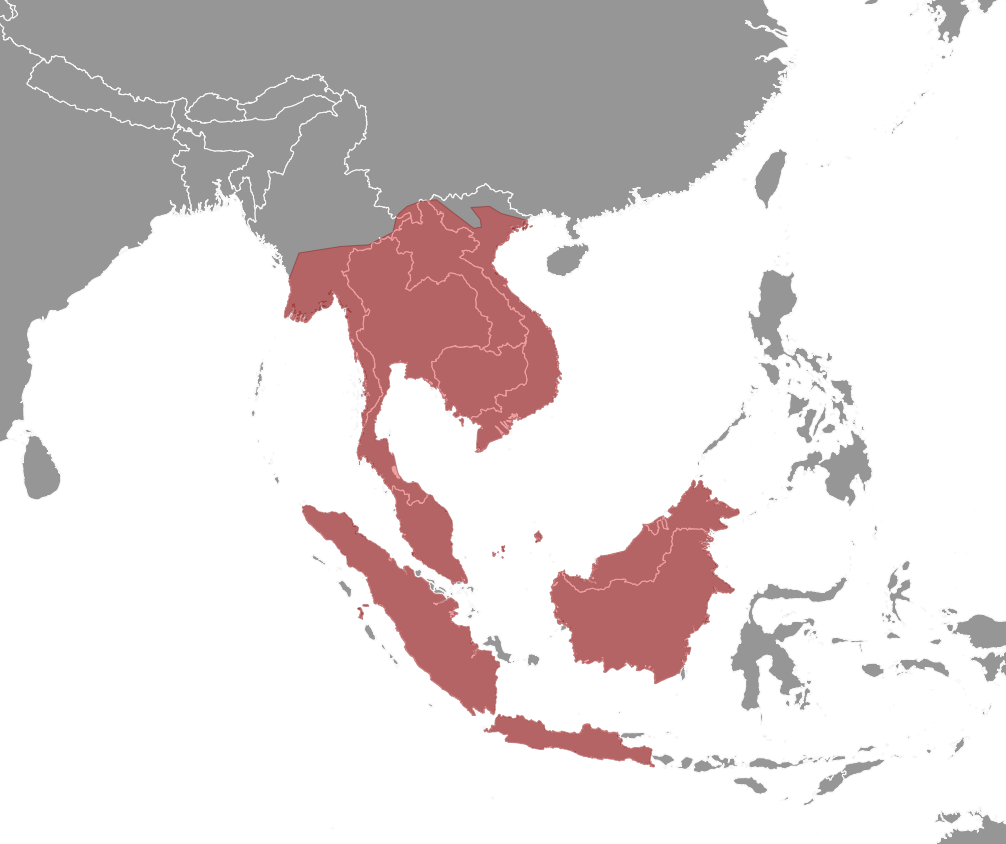

= Red spiny rat =

Species of rodent

The red spiny rat (Maxomys surifer), also known as the Indomalayan maxomys, is a rodent species in the family Muridae that inhabits forests in Myanmar, Thailand, Malaysia, Cambodia, Laos, Vietnam and on the islands of Java, Borneo and Sumatra. In China, it has been recorded only in southernmost Yunnan.
