= Maxomys baeodon =

Conservation status
- Data Deficient (IUCN 3.1)

Scientific classification
- Kingdom: Animalia
- Phylum: Chordata
- Class: Mammalia
- Order: Rodentia
- Family: Muridae
- Genus: Maxomys
- Species: M. baeodon

Binomial name
- Maxomys baeodon (Thomas, 1894)

Species of rodent

Maxomys baeodon, also known as the small Bornean maxomys or small spiny rat, is a species of rodent in the family Muridae. It is known only from Sarawak and Sabah in the Malaysian part of Borneo.
