= Chestnut-bellied spiny rat =

Conservation status
- Data Deficient (IUCN 3.1)

Scientific classification
- Kingdom: Animalia
- Phylum: Chordata
- Class: Mammalia
- Order: Rodentia
- Family: Muridae
- Genus: Maxomys
- Species: M. ochraceiventer

Binomial name
- Maxomys ochraceiventer (Thomas, 1894)

Species of rodent

The chestnut-bellied spiny rat (Maxomys ochraceiventer) is a species of rodent in the family Muridae. It is found in Indonesia and Malaysia.
