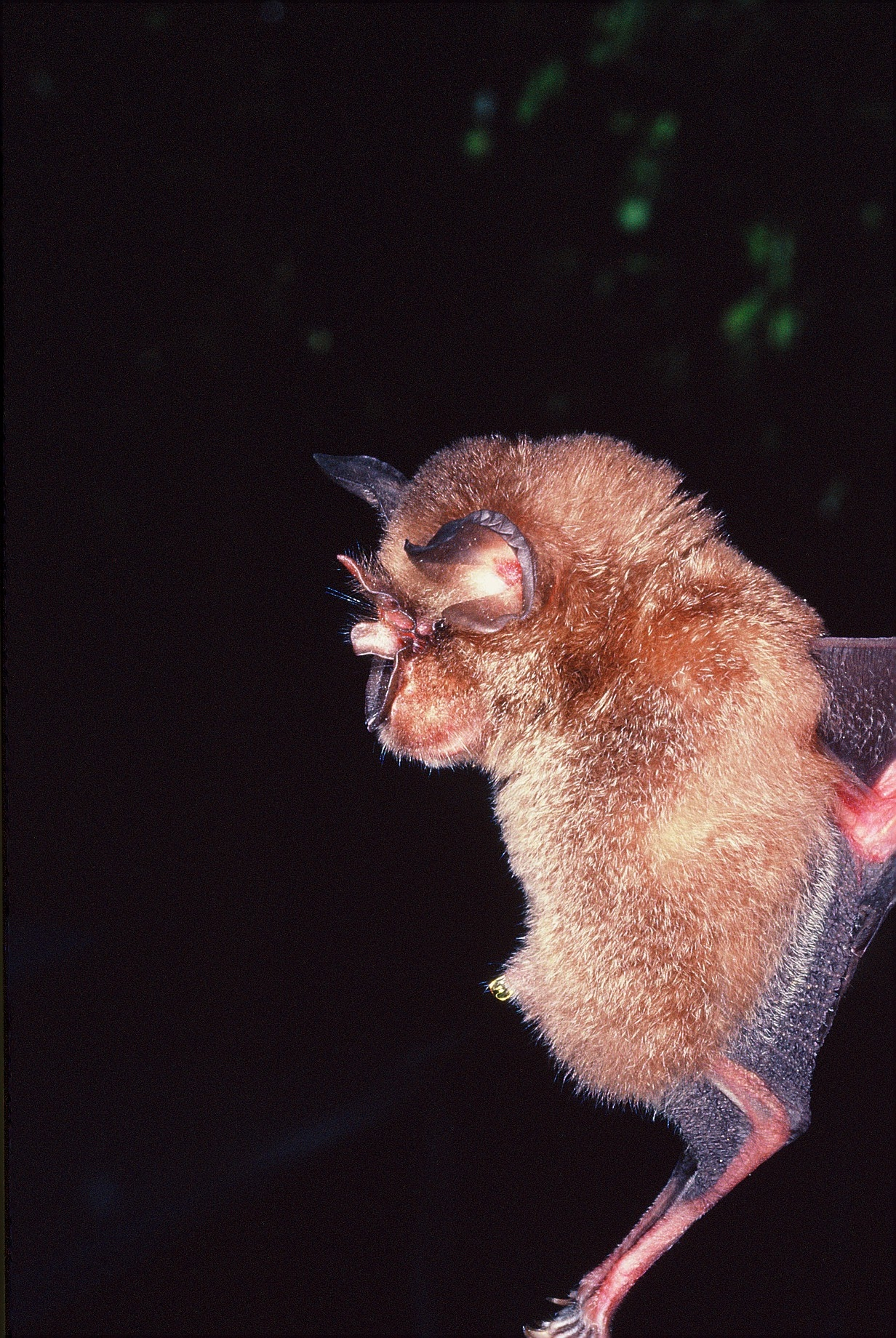

Conservation status
- Data Deficient (IUCN 3.1)

Scientific classification
- Kingdom: Animalia
- Phylum: Chordata
- Class: Mammalia
- Order: Chiroptera
- Family: Rhinolophidae
- Genus: Rhinolophus
- Species: R. arcuatus

Binomial name
- Rhinolophus arcuatus Peters, 1871
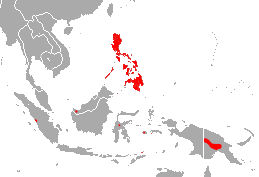
- Arcuate horseshoe bat range

= Arcuate horseshoe bat =

Species of bat

The arcuate horseshoe bat (Rhinolophus arcuatus) is a species of bat in the family Rhinolophidae. It is found in Indonesia, Malaysia, Papua New Guinea, and the Philippines.

== Taxonomy and etymology ==
It was described as a new species in 1871 by German zoologist Wilhelm Peters. Its species name "arcuatus" is Latin for "curved," though Peters gave no explanation as to why he named it thus. Strahan and Conder hypothesized that it was a reference to the appearance of its nose-leaf.

== Biology and ecology ==
It is nocturnal, roosting in sheltered places during the day such as limestone caves. At night it forages for its insect prey by gleaning them off substrates and aerial hawking.

== Range and habitat ==
Its range includes several countries in Southeast Asia, including Malaysia, the Philippines, and Indonesia. It is also found in Papua New Guinea in Oceania. It has been documented at elevations from sea level to 1,600 m (5,200 ft) above sea level.

== Conservation ==
As of 2021, it is evaluated as data deficient by the IUCN.
