= Fredericus Anna Jentink =

Dutch zoologist

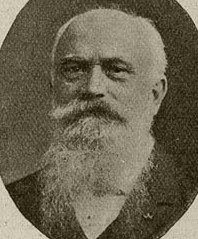
Fredericus Anna Jentink

Fredericus Anna Jentink (20 August 1844, Wymbritseradeel – 4 November 1913, Leiden) was a Dutch zoologist.

== Biography ==
In 1875, he became curator at the Rijksmuseum van Natuurlijke Historie (today Naturalis) in Leiden. In 1884 he followed Hermann Schlegel as director of the museum and as editor of the journal Notes from the Leyden Museum. In 1895 he was president of the 3rd International Congress of Zoology in Leiden and he was among the founding members of the International Commission on Zoological Nomenclature besides Philip Lutley Sclater, Raphaël Blanchard, Julius Victor Carus, and Charles Wardell Stiles. Jentink's main research field was the taxonomy of mammals, where he described several marsupial, bat, and rodent taxa. In 1886, he described the guenon species Cercopithecus signatus (sometimes known as Jentink's guenon) on the basis of one deceased specimen which was obtained by the Rijksmuseum van Natuurlijke Historie from the Diergaarde Blijdorp in Rotterdam in 1877. The original provenance of this species is still unknown but alternatively it might be possible that it is a hybrid between the greater spot-nosed monkey and the moustached guenon. Jentink published the Catalogue ostéologique des mammifères (1887), the Catalogue systématique des mammifères (1892) and Mammals Collected by the Members of the Humboldt Bay and the Merauke River Expeditions:Nova Guinea (1907). Oldfield Thomas named the Jentink's duiker (1892) and the Jentink's squirrel (1887) in honor of Fredericus Anna Jentink.
