= Knee Deep in Hits =

Compilation album by Rip Rig + Panic
- Released: 1990
- Recorded: 1981 – 1983
- Genre: Post-punk
- Length: 48:04
- Label: Virgin
- Producer: Adam Kidron, Sean Oliver, Gareth Sager, Bruce Smith

Rip Rig + Panic chronology
| Kill Me in the Morning (1985) | Knee Deep in Hits (1990) |

Professional ratings
Review scores
| Source | Rating |
|---|---|
| Allmusic | 4.5/5 stars |

Knee Deep in Hits is a compilation album by Rip Rig + Panic, released in 1990 by Virgin Records. The title of the album references a song from their debut album God, "Knee Deep in Shit". This song does not appear on the album itself.

== Track listing ==
| No. | Title | From album (date) | Length |
|---|---|---|---|
| 1. | "You're My Kind of Climate" | You're My Kind of Climate 7" (1982) | 2:48 |
| 2. | "Storm the Reality Asylum" | I Am Cold (1982) | 3:45 |
| 3. | "Sunken Love" | Attitude (1983) | 2:57 |
| 4. | "Warm; To the If in Life" | I Am Cold (1982) | 4:48 |
| 5. | "Go, Go, Go! (This Is It)" | Go, Go, Go! (This Is It) 7" (1981) | 2:17 |
| 6. | "Keep the Sharks From Your Heart" | Attitude (1983) | 3:25 |
| 7. | "Miss Pib" | God (1981) | 1:37 |
| 8. | "Thru' Nomad Eyeballs" | God (1981) | 3:25 |
| 9. | "Do the Tightrope" | Attitude (1983) | 5:53 |
| 10. | "Beat the Beast" | Attitude (1983) | 2:09 |
| 11. | "The Ultimate in Fun (Is Going to the Disco With My Baby)" | Go, Go, Go! This Is It 7" (1981) | 2:30 |
| 12. | "Alchemy in This Cemetry" | Attitude (1983) | 3:20 |
| 13. | "Bob Hope Takes Risks" | Bob Hope Takes Risks 7" (1981) | 3:52 |
| 14. | "Blue Blue Third" | God (1981) | 5:18 |

== Personnel ==
Adapted from the Knee Deep in Hits liner notes.

Rip Rig + Panic

- Neneh Cherry – vocals
- Don Cherry – trumpet (4)
- David Defries – trumpet
- Derek Hanam – Groovebox
- Steve Noble – drums (9, 10)
- Andrea Oliver – vocals (9)
- Sean Oliver – bass guitar, vocals, production
- Jez Parfitt – baritone saxophone
- Gareth Sager – saxophone, guitar, piano, keyboards, vocals, design
- Sarah Sarahandi – viola
- Bruce Smith – drums, percussion, production
- Mark Springer – piano, saxophone, vocals
- Dave Flash Wright – saxophone

Production and additional personnel

- Adam Kidron – production (3, 6, 9, 10, 12)
- Jill Mumford – design
- Renegade – design

== Release history ==
| Region | Date | Label | Format | Catalog |
|---|---|---|---|---|
| United Kingdom | 1990 | Virgin | CD, CS, LP | OVED 329 |
