= Rip Rig + Panic discography =

- Studio albums: 4
- Compilation albums: 1
- Singles: 7

The discography of English post-punk band Rip Rig + Panic consists of four studio albums, one compilation album and seven singles.

== Albums ==
=== Studio albums ===
Title	Album details	UK Indie
God	Released: 3 September 1981 (UK); Label: Virgin; Formats: LP	—
I Am Cold	Released: 18 June 1982 (UK); Label: Virgin; Formats: LP	—
Attitude	Released: 1982; Label: Virgin; Formats: LP	—
Kill Me in the Morning (as Float Up CP)	Released: 1985; Label: Rough Trade; Formats: LP	21
"—" denotes a recording that did not chart or was not released in that territory.

=== Compilation albums ===
Title	Album details
Knee Deep in Hits	Released: 1990; Label: Virgin; Formats: CD, CS, LP

== Singles ==
Title	Year	UK Indie	Album
"Go, Go, Go! (This Is It)"	1981	—	Non-album singles
"Bob Hope Takes Risks"	1981	—	Non-album singles
"You're My Kind of Climate"	1982	—	Non-album singles
"Storm the Reality Asylum"	1982	—	I Am Cold
"Beat the Beast"	1983	—	Attitude
"Do the Tightrope"	1983	—	Attitude
"Joy's Address" (as Float Up CP)	1984	16	Kill Me in the Morning
"—" denotes a recording that did not chart or was not released in that territory.
