= Vorderman =

Vorderman is a surname of Dutch origin. People with the name include:

- Adolphe Vorderman (1844–1902), Dutch physician and scientist
  - Vordermann's flying squirrel
  - Vordermann's pipistrelle
- Carol Vorderman (born 1960), Welsh media personality and writer, great-granddaughter of Adolphe
