= Joy's Address =

Single by Float Up CP

from the album Kill Me in the Morning
- B-side: "Desert Heart"
- Released: 1984
- Genre: Post-punk
- Length: 3:39
- Label: Rough Trade
- Songwriter: Gareth Sager
- Producers: Sean Oliver, Gareth Sager

Rip Rig + Panic singles chronology
"You're My Kind of Climate" (1982)	"Joy's Address" (1984)

"Joy's Address" is a song by the English post-punk band Float Up CP. It is the only single released in support of their 1985 album Kill Me in the Morning.

== Formats and track listing ==
All songs written by Gareth Sager.

UK 7" single (RT 150)

1. "Joy's Address" – 3:39
2. "Desert Heart" – 2:52

UK 12" single (RTT 150)

1. "Joy's Address" – 5:29
2. "Desert Heart" – 2:52

== Accolades ==
Year	Publication	Country	Accolade	Rank
1984	Rockerilla	Italy	Singles of the Year	18

== Personnel ==
Adapted from the Joy's Address liner notes.

Float Up CP

- Neneh Cherry – vocals
- Ollie Moore – saxophone
- Sean Oliver – bass guitar, backing vocals, production
- Gareth Sager – guitar, keyboards, vocals, production, design
- Bruce Smith – drums

Additional musicians

- David Defries – trumpet
- Derek Goddard – drums

Production and additional personnel

- Neville Brody – design
- Ben Rogan – engineering

== Charts ==
Chart (1984)	Peak position
UK Indie Chart	16

== Release history ==
Region	Date	Label	Format	Catalog
United Kingdom	1984	Rough Trade	7", 12"	RT 150
