= I Am Cold =

Studio album by Rip Rig + Panic
- Released: 18 June 1982
- Genre: Post-punk
- Length: 60:11
- Label: Virgin
- Producer: Rip Rig + Panic

Rip Rig + Panic chronology
God (1981)	I Am Cold (1982)	Attitude (1983)

Professional ratings
Review scores
Source	Rating
AllMusic	3/5 stars
PopMatters	6/10
Q	3/5 stars

I Am Cold is the second studio album by post-punk band Rip Rig + Panic, released on 18 June 1982 by Virgin Records. Like the group's first album God, it was released as two 12" 45 rpm discs; the group's subsequent album Attitude would be a conventional 12" 33 rpm release. In 2013, the album was reissued by Cherry Red Records on CD with an additional tracks taken from singles.

== Track listing ==
All music is composed by Sean Oliver, Gareth Sager, Bruce Smith and Mark Springer.

North Side
No.	Title	Length
1.	"Hunger (The Ocean Roars It Bites)"	3:47
2.	"Epi Epi Arp Woosh!"	4:36
3.	"Another Tampon Up the Arse of Humanity"	4:20
4.	"Misa Luba (Lone Wolf)"	2:10

East Side
No.	Title	Length
1.	"Storm the Reality Asylum"	7:17
2.	"Here Gathers Nameless Energy (Volcanoes Covered by Snow)"	4:55
3.	"A Dog's Secret"	3:53
4.	"Liars Shape Up or Ship Out"	2:06

South Side
No.	Title	Length
1.	"Warm; To the If in Life"	4:46
2.	"Nurse Increase the Sedatives (The Torment's No Better)"	4:29
3.	"Take a Don Key to Mystery"	3:23

West Side
No.	Title	Length
1.	"Tax Sex"	5:51
2.	"Subversive Wisdom"	5:27
3.	"Fire Eyes Joyful Silent Tears"	2:55

2013 CD track listing
No.	Title	Length
1.	"You're My Kind of Climate" (7" version)	2:50
2.	"Hunger (The Ocean Roars It Bites)"	3:47
3.	"Epi Epi Arp Woosh!"	4:36
4.	"Another Tampon Up the Arse of Humanity"	4:20
5.	"Misa Luba (Lone Wolf)"	2:10
6.	"Storm the Reality Asylum"	7:17
7.	"Here Gathers Nameless Energy (Volcanoes Covered by Snow)"	4:55
8.	"A Dog's Secret"	3:53
9.	"Liars Shape Up or Ship Out"	2:06
10.	"Warm; To the If in Life"	4:46
11.	"Nurse Increase the Sedatives (The Torment's No Better)"	4:29
12.	"Take a Don Key to Mystery"	3:23
13.	"Tax Sex"	5:51
14.	"Subversive Wisdom"	5:27
15.	"Fire Eyes Joyful Silent Tears"	2:55
16.	"She Gets So Hungry at Night She Eats Her Jewellery"	5:54
17.	"You're My Kind of Climate" (12" version)	6:05
18.	"Storm the Reality Asylum" (Extended version)	7:20

== Accolades ==
Year	Publication	Country	Accolade	Rank
1982	Rockerilla	Italy	Albums of the Year	10

== Personnel ==
Adapted from the I Am Cold liner notes.

Rip Rig + Panic

- Neneh Cherry – vocals (A2, B1, C3, D1)
- Sean Oliver – bass guitar
- Gareth Sager – piano (A4, B1, B3, C1, D3), guitar (A3, B2, D1), clarinet (B2, B4, C3), alto saxophone (A3, C2), string arrangement (B1, B4), bass clarinet (A3), vocals (C3)
- Bruce Smith – drums, percussion
- Mark Springer – piano (A1-A3, B2, B4, C2, C3, D1, D2), vocals (A1, A2, B1, B2, C1, C2, D2), tenor saxophone (A3, B1), soprano saxophone (B3, C1, D3), bass clarinet (B3), clavinet (C2)

Additional musicians

- Don Cherry – trumpet (A2, B2, B3, C1, C3, D4), melodica (A2, C1), vocals (B2, C3)
- David Defries – trumpet (B1, C2, D1), horn arrangement (B3)
- Debbie Holmes – cello (B1)
- Woo Honeymoon – violin (B1, B4)
- Giles Leaman – additional drums and percussion
- Jez Parfitt – baritone saxophone (D1)
- Steve Noble – additional drums and percussion

Additional musicians (cont.)

- Andrea Oliver – backing vocals (B1, D1)
- Sarah Sarahandi – viola (A1, B1, B4)
- Dave "Flash" Wright – tenor saxophone (B1, B3, C1, C2), flute (B3)

Production and additional personnel

- Anna Arnoe – photography
- David Corrio – photography
- Howard Gray – engineering
- Dave Hunt – engineering
- Lester Johnston – engineering
- Adam Kidron – engineering
- Jill Mumford – design
- Sally Orsono – photography
- Pablo Picasso – cover art
- Sid Rudland – engineering
- Nick Watson – remastering

== Release history ==
Region	Date	Label	Format	Catalog
United Kingdom	1982	Virgin	LP	V 2228
United Kingdom	2013	Cherry Red	CD	CDMRED 573
