= Attitude (Rip Rig + Panic album) =

Studio album by Rip Rig + Panic
- Released: 1983
- Genre: Post-punk
- Length: 41:28
- Label: Virgin
- Producer: Adam Kidron, Gareth Sager

Rip Rig + Panic chronology
I Am Cold (1982)	Attitude (1983)	Kill Me in the Morning (1985)

Attitude is the third and final studio album by the post-punk band Rip Rig + Panic, released in 1983 by Virgin Records.

== Reception ==
Professional ratings
Review scores
Source	Rating
AllMusic	3/5 stars
PopMatters	6/10
Q	3/5 stars

In Melody Maker, Lynden Barker described the album as "marvellous", saying that "(t)hough not as immediately appealing as God ... it possesses a multi-layered makeup that becomes more and more exciting on each successive spin". Douglas Baptie of The Digital Fix wondered "Why wasn't it more popular?" and said that the album "somehow combines the best qualities of the previous two". The List's Neil Cooper called Attitude "the most honed, conventionally focused and 'produced'" of Rip Rig + Panic's three.

== Track listing ==
All tracks are written by Sean Oliver, Gareth Sager and Mark Springer

Side one
No.	Title	Length
1.	"Keep the Sharks From Your Heart"	3:49
2.	"Sunken Love"	2:55
3.	"Rip Open, But Oh So Long Thy Wounds Take to Heal"	3:09
4.	"Do the Tightrope"	3:19
5.	"Intimacy, Just Gently Shimmer"	3:17
6.	"How That Spark Sets Me Aglow"	3:26

Side two
No.	Title	Length
1.	"Alchemy in This Cemetry"	3:19
2.	"Beat the Beast"	2:07
3.	"The Birth Pangs of Spring"	3:24
4.	"Eros; What Brings Colour Up the Stem?"	4:07
5.	"Push Your Tiny Body as High as Your Desire Can Take You"	1:27
6.	"Viva X Dreams"	7:02

2013 CD issue bonus tracks
No.	Title	Length
13.	"Do the Tightrope" (12" version)	5:53
14.	"1619 A Dutch Vessel Docks in the U.S.A. With 20 Humans for Sale"	7:21
15.	"Blip This Jig It's Shamanic"	0:47
16.	"Beat the Beast (Sob Sob I'm Gonna Jail This Hell Hole Itch)"	3:40
17.	"Leave Your Spittle in the Pot"	4:42
18.	"It's Always Tit for Tac You Foolish Brats"	1:44
19.	"Do the Tightrope" (Instrumental version)	5:56
20.	"You're My Kind of Climate" (Dance mix)	6:06

== Personnel ==
Adapted from the Attitude liner notes.

Rip Rig + Panic

- Neneh Cherry – vocals (A1, A2, A6, B1, B2, B4)
- Sean Oliver – bass guitar
- Gareth Sager – guitar (A4, A6, B1, B3), vocals (B1, B2, B6), alto saxophone (B3, B6), clarinet (A1, A2), piano (A5), horn and string arrangement (A1, A2, A4, A6, B4, B5), production, design
- Bruce Smith – drums (A1-A3, B1, B3, B4)
- Mark Springer – piano (A1-A3, A6, B1, B4-B6), vocals (A4, B4, B6), soprano saxophone (B2), harmonica (B4)

Additional musicians

- David Defries – trumpet (A1, A4, B1, B2, B4)
- Woo Honeymoon – violin (A2, A4, A6, B1, B4)
- Giles Leaman – additional drums and percussion
- Steve Noble – drums (A4, A6, B2, B6)

Additional musicians (cont.)

- Andrea Oliver – vocals (A4, B6)
- Sarah Sarahandi – viola (A2, A4-A6, B1, B2, B4, B5)
- Dave "Flash" Wright – tenor saxophone (A1, A3, A4, A5, B1, B2, B4-B6)

Production and additional personnel

- T. Charrington – photography
- Tim Hunt – engineering
- Adam Kidron – production
- Jill Mumford – design
- Mark Stewart – engineering
- Ken Thomas – engineering
- Nick Watson – remastering

== Release history ==
Region	Date	Label	Format	Catalog
United Kingdom	1983	Virgin	LP	V 2268
United Kingdom	2013	Cherry Red	CD	CDMRED 574
