= Kill Me in the Morning =

Studio album by Float Up CP
- Released: December 1985
- Studio: Terminal 24 Studios, Almeida Street, London SE17
- Genre: Post-punk
- Length: 37:23
- Label: Rough Trade
- Producer: Sean Oliver, Gareth Sager

Rip Rig + Panic chronology
Attitude (1983)	Kill Me in the Morning (1985)	Knee Deep in Hits (1990)

Kill Me in the Morning is the only studio album by the post-punk band Float Up CP, whose members had previously been in the group Rip Rig + Panic. The album was released in December 1985 by Rough Trade Records.

== Track listing ==
All tracks are written by Gareth Sager.

Side one
No.	Title	Length
1.	"Chemically Wet"	4:30
2.	"He Loves Me (No, No, No)"	4:19
3.	"The Loneliest Girl"	3:54
4.	"Forever Party"	3:20
5.	"M.A.D."	4:09

Side two
No.	Title	Length
1.	"Ghost Train Dive"	3:41
2.	"My Memory"	2:07
3.	"Assassins"	3:03
4.	"Secret Desire"	2:49
5.	"Joy's Address"	3:34
6.	"Sexy Bushes"	1:57

== Personnel ==
Adapted from the Kill Me in the Morning liner notes.

Float Up CP

- Neneh Cherry – vocals
- Ollie Moore – saxophone
- Sean Oliver – bass guitar, backing vocals, production
- Gareth Sager – guitar, keyboards, vocals, production
- Bruce Smith – drums

Additional musicians

- David Defries – trumpet (B5)
- Derek Goddard – drums (B5)
- Sarah Sarahandi – violin

Production and additional personnel

- Dennis Bovell – co-producer (A2)
- Francis DeSouza – mastering
- Martin Rex – engineering

== Charts ==
Chart (1985)	Peak position
UK Indie Chart	21

== Release history ==
Region	Date	Label	Format	Catalog
United Kingdom	1985	Rough Trade	LP	ROUGH 77
