= You're My Kind of Climate =

Single by Rip Rig + Panic
- B-side: "She Gets So Hungry at Night She Eats Her Jewellery"
- Released: 4 June 1982
- Genre: Post-punk
- Length: 2:50
- Label: Virgin
- Songwriters: Sean Oliver, Gareth Sager, Bruce Smith and Mark Springer
- Producer: Rip Rig + Panic

Rip Rig + Panic singles chronology
"Bob Hope Takes Risks" (1981)	"You're My Kind of Climate" (1982)	"Joy's Address" (1984)

"You're My Kind of Climate" is a song by the English post-punk band Rip Rig + Panic. It was released as a single on 4 June 1982.

== Formats and track listing ==
All lyrics by Gareth Sager, all music by Sean Oliver, Gareth Sager, Bruce Smith and Mark Springer.

UK 7" single (VS 507)

1. "You're My Kind of Climate" – 2:50
2. "She Gets So Hungry at Night She Eats Her Jewellery" – 5:54

UK 12" single (VS 507(12))

1. "You're My Kind of Climate" – 6:05
2. "She Gets So Hungry at Night She Eats Her Jewellery" – 5:54

== Accolades ==
Year	Publication	Country	Accolade	Rank
1982	Rockerilla	Italy	Singles of the Year	16

== Personnel ==
Adapted from the You're My Kind of Climate liner notes.

Rip Rig + Panic

- Neneh Cherry – lead vocals
- Sean Oliver – bass guitar
- Gareth Sager – guitar, piano
- Bruce Smith – drums, percussion
- Mark Springer – piano

Additional musicians

- David Defries – trumpet
- Giles Leaman – additional drums and percussion
- Jez Parfitt – baritone saxophone
- Steve Noble – additional drums and percussion
- Sarah Sarahandi – viola

Additional musicians (cont.)

- Alf Waite – trombone
- Dave "Flash" Wright – tenor saxophone

Production and additional personnel

- Jean Cocteau – photography
- Howard Gray – engineering
- Dave Hunt – engineering
- Lester Johnston – engineering
- Adam Kidron – engineering
- Jill Mumford – design
- Rip Rig + Panic – production, design
- Sid Rudland – engineering

== Release history ==
Region	Date	Label	Format	Catalog
United Kingdom	1982	Virgin	7", 12"	VS 507
