= Miquita Oliver =

British television presenter

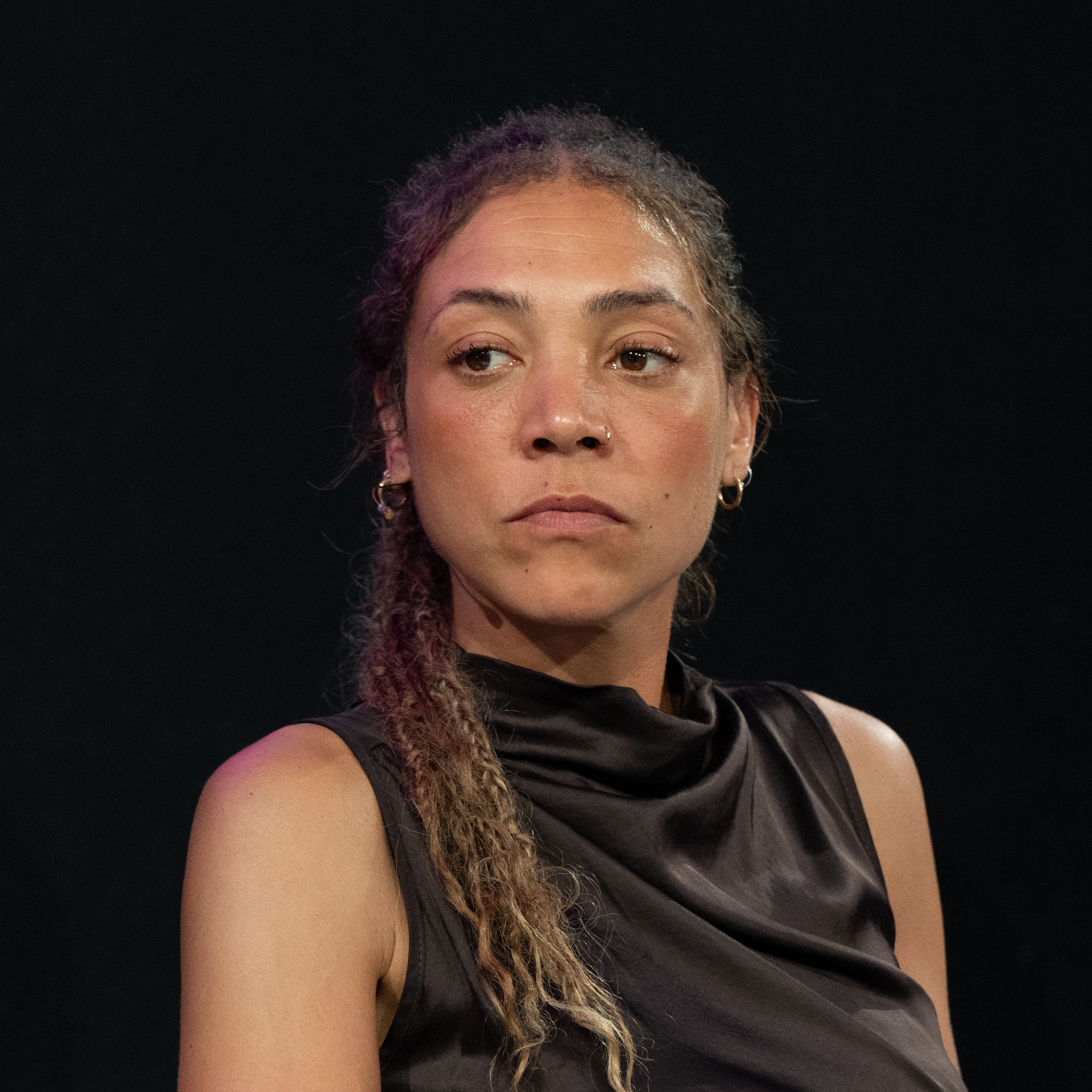
- At SXSW London, June 2026
- Born: Miquita Billie Alexandra Oliver; 25 April 1984 (age 42); Paddington, London, England
- Occupation: Television presenter
- Parent: Andi Oliver (mother)

Miquita Billie Alexandra Oliver (born 25 April 1984) is a British television presenter and radio personality. With Simon Amstell, she co-hosted Channel 4's Popworld from 2001 to 2006. She went on to present on T4 from 2006 to 2010, as well as having her own show, The Month with Miquita, on 4Music. Oliver has also worked in radio, hosting shows on BBC Radio 1 and BBC Radio 1Xtra. In April/May 2015, she took part in a four-part series, 24 Hours in the Past, as herself.

== Early and personal life ==
Miquita Oliver was born in Paddington, London and grew up in Ladbroke Grove. Her mother is the former Rip Rig + Panic singer and television presenter Andi Oliver, of Antiguan descent; her father Robin Baillie is a Scottish art history teacher. Oliver's godmother is Casualty actress Amanda Mealing.

Miquita Oliver attended Holland Park School. She left school early with no GCSE qualifications.

== Career ==
In 2001, aged 16, Oliver became presenter of the Channel 4 music show Popworld, co-presenting with Simon Amstell. The pair were known for employing a great deal of humour in interviews. They left the show in 2006, but Oliver continued to present the T4 strand.

Oliver and Amstell survived the 2004 Indian Ocean tsunami while on holiday together in Thailand. She has since participated in disaster relief charity events.

Oliver appeared on panel game Never Mind the Buzzcocks, hosted by Amstell, in 2007.

After an incident in mid-2010 in which she was overheard insulting singer Kesha behind her back by Kesha's management, Oliver was suspended from T4 for six weeks and subsequently her contract was not renewed. She recorded her last T4 in December 2010.

Oliver sang on The Slits' 2006 EP Revenge of the Killer Slits.

She has hosted shows on both BBC Radio 1 and BBC Radio 1Xtra, notably covering for Sara Cox and Spoony. She left her early morning show Oneclick to concentrate on TV projects. In an interview with Heat magazine, Oliver said that she was sacked from BBC Radio 1 following a comment she made in an interview with NME magazine about Fearne Cotton, calling her a "devil woman".

Oliver made a brief appearance in May 2007 on the BBC programme Neneh & Andi Dish It Up – presented by her mother Andi and Neneh Cherry – and has also made appearances on political talk show This Week, on 25 June 2009 and 17 December 2009. In March 2010, Oliver made a programme for Channel 4's T4 called Miquita's Oliver. She was set the challenge of starting a one-off urban production of the classic musical Oliver! from scratch. She had to cast it, script it and then direct it. The finished product was performed at the Hackney Empire to surprising critical acclaim.

In 2009, Oliver hosted a Miquita Does series:

1. "Miquita Does American Boys"
2. "Miquita Does All-Time Floorfillers"
3. "Miquita Does Number 1s"
4. "Miquita Does Movies"
5. "Miquita Does Pop"
6. "Miquita Does Power Ballads"
7. "Miquita Does Urban Anthems"

She then went on to have her own television show, called The Month With Miquita, which she hosted on the 4Music channel. She continued to present programmes for T4, such as T4 Movie Special in August 2011.

In November 2011, Oliver filed for bankruptcy after non-payment of a tax bill. In December 2011 she made an appearance on the BBC Three programme Mongrels as a guest presenter in the final episode, titled "Miquita and the Obligatory Clips Show". The episode is a faux behind-the-scenes retrospective of the show. In December 2013 she presented the programme Young, British and Broke: The Truth about Payday Loans on BBC Three. She said that her own experiences of bankruptcy made her passionate about making the show.

Oliver was a part of the four-part BBC TV series 24 Hours in the Past, along with Colin Jackson, Alistair McGowan, Ann Widdecombe, Tyger Drew-Honey and Zoe Lucker which went out between 28 April and 19 May 2015 on BBC One.

Miquita has appeared with her mother Andi Oliver on Celebrity Gogglebox in 2021, 2022 and 2023.

Starting on 23 January 2022, BBC television began broadcasting the series The Caribbean with Andi and Miquita. Oliver and her mother started the series by visiting Antigua. Here they met members of their extended family, reconnected with their Antiguan heritage, and illuminated the island's history and culture.

In 2024, Oliver began hosting a twice-weekly BBC Sounds podcast, Miss Me?, with her lifelong friend Lily Allen. In response to Allen admitting to having multiple abortions on the podcast, Oliver added that she’d had about five abortions as well.

=== Fashion ===
In 2008, Oliver, along with vinspired, helped launch Fashion Favours, a collection of reworked fashion items, customised by volunteers from around the UK. On 25 September 2008, to promote Fashion Favours, Miquita modelled Prime Minister Gordon Brown's shirt.

On 25 June 2009, Oliver appeared on the political talk show This Week to discuss issues relating to fashion and also Speaker John Bercow's decision not to wear the traditional robes, and French President Nicolas Sarkozy's decision to ban the burqa in France.
