= Basilan flying squirrel =

Conservation status
- Least Concern (IUCN 3.1)

Scientific classification
- Kingdom: Animalia
- Phylum: Chordata
- Class: Mammalia
- Order: Rodentia
- Family: Sciuridae
- Genus: Petinomys
- Species: P. crinitus

Binomial name
- Petinomys crinitus (Hollister, 1911)
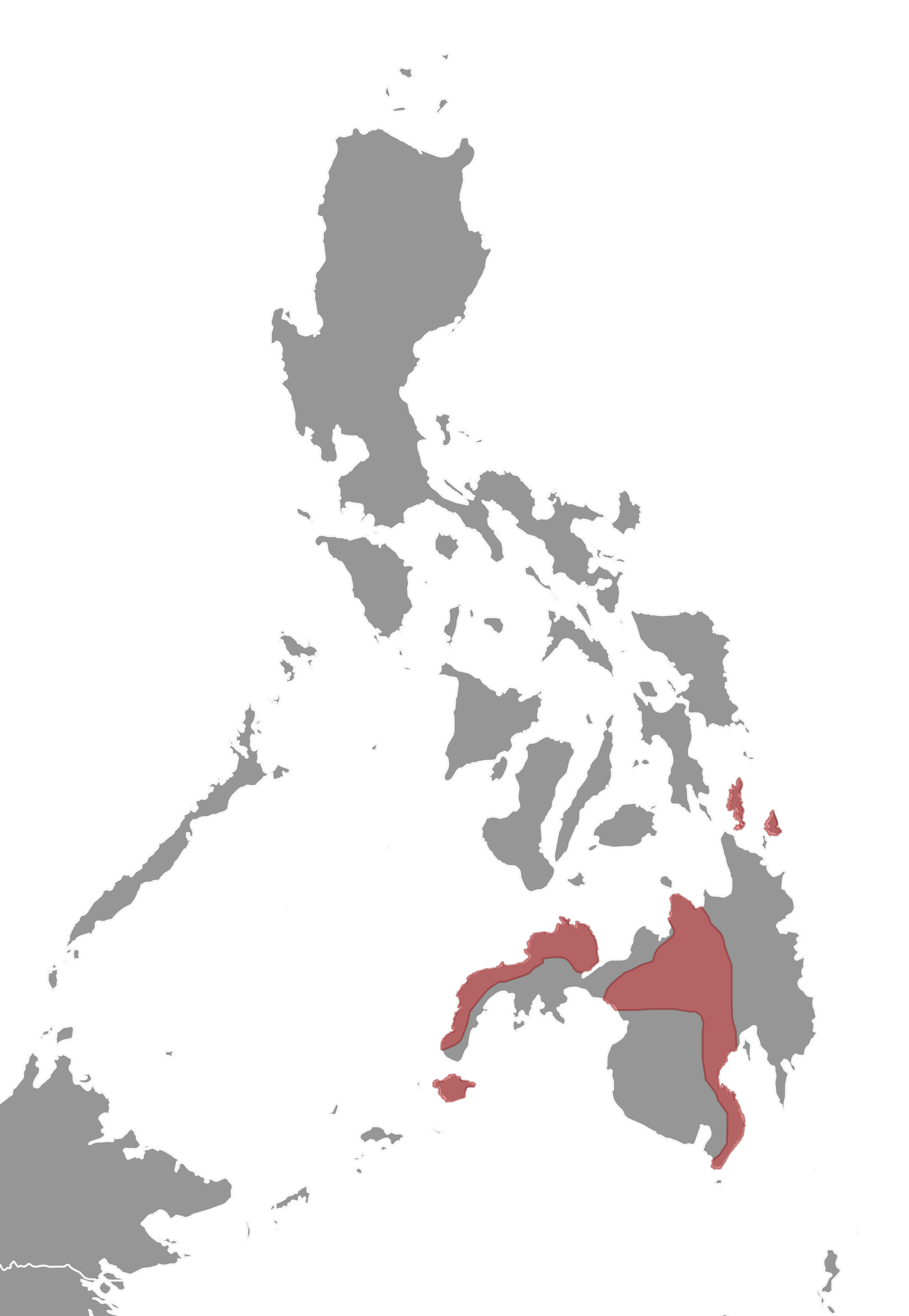
- Basilan flying squirrel range

Species of rodent

The Basilan flying squirrel (Philippines flying squirrel or Mindanao flying squirrel) (Petinomys crinitus) is a species of rodent in the family Sciuridae. It is endemic to the Philippines. It is often confused with the mindanao flying squirrel (Petinomys mindanensis).
