= Popworld =

- Created by: Robert Dodds; Simon Fuller
- Presented by: Miquita Oliver; Simon Amstell; Alex Zane; Alexa Chung
- Country of origin: United Kingdom
- Original language: English

Production
- Running time: 45 minutes
- Production company: At It Productions

Original release
- Network: Channel 4
- Release: 21 January 2001 – 14 July 2007

Popworld is a British television programme that was broadcast on Channel 4 as part of the T4 strand, featuring pop news, trivia, gossip, interviews and music videos, as well as musical performances from contemporary artists.

The show began on 21 January 2001 and was initially presented by Miquita Oliver and Simon Amstell. Alex Zane and Alexa Chung took over the hosting role in 2006. Popworld was broadcast every Sunday morning on Channel 4 at 10:30am, and repeated on E4 at 2:00pm the following day.

On 27 April 2007, Channel 4 announced they would not be recommissioning the show, and after six years on air, Popworld ended on 14 July 2007.

== History ==
Popworld began in 2000 as a website founded by pop mogul Simon Fuller, and the accompanying show (first transmitted daily at teatime on E4) was originally intended for a pre-adolescent audience. The show's original hosts were Nickelodeon presenter Simon Amstell and 16-year-old Miquita Oliver. The original ratings for the programme were dismal, but as Amstell and Oliver gradually warmed to each other (their relationship was strained in the early days) and had greater control of what they could say, the ratings improved. Popworld finally made it on to T4 (Channel 4's youth strand) in the spring of 2001. In the early series, the show featured Leigh Francis as the character Barry Gibson.

During Amstell and Oliver's tenure on the show, it often used surreal humour and small references to Jewish culture in the United Kingdom; for example, Amstell had been shown reading The Jewish Chronicle, as well as making references to festivals and customs. Since its inception, the show gradually grew more and more dry and sarcastic, with singers and bands being subtly, and by 2004 more overtly, mocked. By the end of Amstell and Oliver's tenure on the show, it had gained a cult following as the alternative to limitlessly enthusiastic programmes such as Top of the Pops. Notable events that occurred during their tenure included openly gay Amstell coming on to homophobic reggae star Beenie Man, and Britney Spears walking out of an interview in tears. The Kooks refused to do an interview on their second appearance on the show, after Amstell's repeated references to the singer's ex-girlfriend Katie Melua during their first interview.

In February 2006, Amstell and Oliver announced they would be leaving the show. Following their departure episode, Alex Zane and Alexa Chung took over presenting until its series finale in July 2007.

== Magazine ==
Popworld launched a magazine of the same name in 2003, but production was stopped after just one year.

In late 2006, it was announced that Popworld was launching a weekly magazine called Popworld Pulp. 130,000 copies were produced for launch, which took place in April 2007. After only a week, it was axed due to selling only 7% of its newsagent allocation, despite a £1.49 cover price and a wide promotional campaign. Two weeks later, the show, too, announced it was ending.

== See also ==
- Popworld Promotes
