= God (Rip Rig + Panic album) =

Album by Rip Rig + Panic

Studio album by Rip Rig + Panic
- Released: 3 September 1981
- Genre: Post-punk
- Length: 41:45
- Label: Virgin
- Producer: Rip Rig + Panic

Rip Rig + Panic chronology
God (1981)	I Am Cold (1982)

Professional ratings
Review scores
Source	Rating
Allmusic	4.5/5 stars
PopMatters	(6/10)
Q	3/5 stars

God is the debut studio album of post-punk band Rip Rig + Panic, released on 3 September 1981 by Virgin Records. It took the unusual form of two 12" 45 rpm discs, a format which would be repeated with the group's second album, I Am Cold. In 2013, the album was reissued by Cherry Red Records on CD with an additional tracks taken from singles.

== Track listing ==
All tracks composed by Rip Rig + Panic; except where indicated

Red Side
No.	Title	Writer(s)	Lead Vocals	Length
1.	"Constant Drudgery Is Harmful to SOUL, SPIRIT & HEALTH"	Rip Rig + Panic, Dave "Flash" Wright	Neneh Cherry	3:24
2.	"WILHELM Show Me the Diagram (Function of the Orgasm)"			1:10
3.	"Through Nomad Eyeballs"		Mark Springer	3:28
4.	"Change Your Life"		Ari Up	3:01

Yellow Side
No.	Title	Writer(s)	Lead Vocals	Length
1.	"Knee Deep in Shit"		Gareth Sager	3:29
2.	"Totally Naked (Without Lock or Key)"			1:53
3.	"Try Box Out of This Box"	Rip Rig + Panic, Dave "Flash" Wright	Dave "Flash" Wright	2:33
4.	"Need (De School You)"	lyrics: Neneh Cherry	Neneh Cherry	1:32

Green Side
No.	Title	Writer(s)	Lead Vocals	Length
1.	"HOWL! Caged Bird"			3:30
2.	"Those Eskimo Women Speak Frankly"	lyrics: Neneh Cherry	Neneh Cherry	3:13
3.	"The Blue Blue Third"			5:25

Blue Side
No.	Title	Writer(s)	Lead Vocals	Length
1.	"Shadows Only There Because of the Sun"	lyrics: Ari Up	Ari Up	3:00
2.	"BEWARE (Our Leaders Love the Smell of Napalm)"			1:50
3.	"Miss Pib"		Gareth Sager	1:34
4.	"It Don't Mean a Thing If It Ain't Got That Brrod"		Mark Springer	2:57

2013 CD issue bonus tracks
No.	Title	Writer(s)	Lead Vocals	Length
16.	"Bob Hope Takes Risks" (7" version)	lyrics: Gareth Sager	Gareth Sager, Neneh Cherry	3:53
17.	"Go, Go, Go!"	lyrics: Gareth Sager	Gareth Sager, Mark Springer, Neneh Cherry	2:18
18.	"The Ultimate in Fun (Is Going to the Disco with My Baby)"		Ari Up	2:31
19.	"Hey Mr E! A Gran Grin With a Shake of Smile"		Don Cherry, Mark Springer	5:11
20.	"Billy Eckstein's Shirt Collar"		Ari Up	3:21
21.	"Bob Hope Takes Risks" (12" version)	lyrics: Gareth Sager	Gareth Sager, Neneh Cherry	7:01

== Accolades ==
Year	Publication	Country	Accolade	Rank
1981	Rockerilla	Italy	Albums of the Year	6

== Personnel ==
Adapted from the God liner notes.

Rip Rig + Panic

- Sean Oliver – bass guitar, backing vocals (A1)
- Gareth Sager – guitar (A1, B1, B2, B4, D1, D2), clarinet (A1, A3, C1, D2), alto saxophone (D1, D4, 17), keyboards (B1, B3, C1), organ (B1, B3, C1), lead vocals (B1, D3), backing vocals (A1), Japanese marimba (C3), violin (C2)
- Bruce Smith – drums, percussion
- Mark Springer – piano (A1-A4, B1-B4, C2, D2, D4), lead vocals (A3, D4), bass clarinet (C1, D2), trumpet (B4), soprano saxophone (C1), tenor saxophone (C2), backing vocals (C2, D3)

Additional musicians

- Neneh Cherry – lead vocals (A1, B4, C2)
- Ari Up – backing vocals (A3, B1), lead vocals (A4, D1),
- Dave "Flash" Wright – tenor saxophone (A1, B2, B3), lead vocals (B3)
- Don Cherry – trumpet (19)
- Susan Woo Honeymoon – violin (16, 21)
- Sarah Sarhandi – viola (16, 21)
- Alf Waite – trombone (16, 21)
- Debbie Holmes – cello (16, 21)

Production and additional personnel

- John Dominis – photography
- Howard Gray – engineering
- Dave Hunt – engineering
- Adam Kidron – engineering
- Jill Mumford – sleeve design
- Rip Rig + Panic – production, sleeve design
- John Walker – engineering
- Nick Watson – remastering

== Release history ==
Region	Date	Label	Format	Catalog
United Kingdom	1981	Virgin	LP	V 2213
United Kingdom	2013	Cherry Red	CD	CDMRED 572
