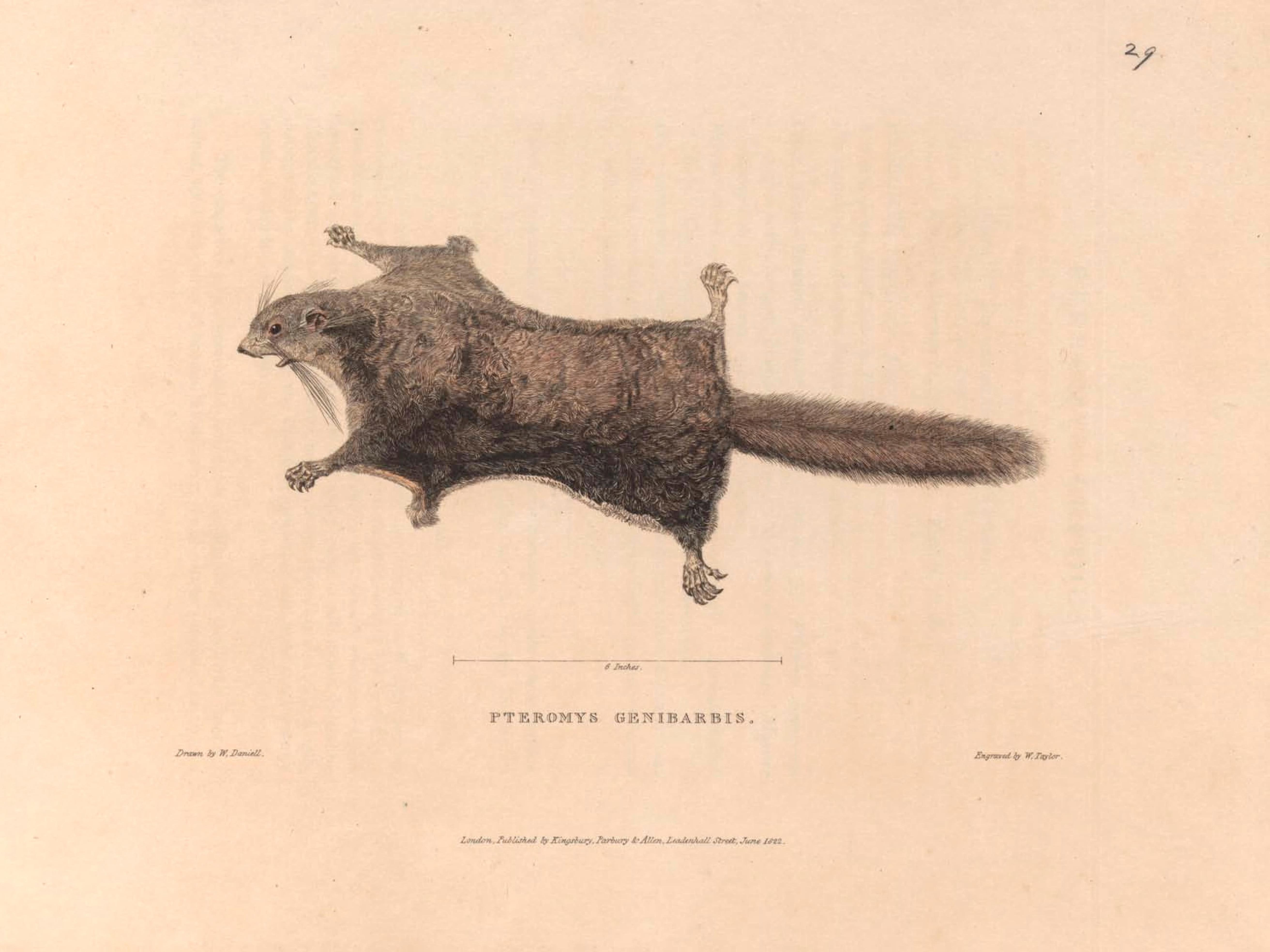
- Whiskered flying squirrel (P. genibarbis)

Scientific classification
- Domain: Eukaryota
- Kingdom: Animalia
- Phylum: Chordata
- Class: Mammalia
- Order: Rodentia
- Family: Sciuridae
- Tribe: Pteromyini
- Genus: Petinomys; Thomas, 1908

Type species
- Sciuropterus lugens Thomas, 1895

Species
- See text

= Petinomys =

Petinomys Temporal range: Late Miocene - Recent

Genus of rodents

Petinomys is a genus of flying squirrels. They are known commonly as the dwarf flying squirrels.

There are approximately 8 species. They are native to Asia.

Species include:

- Basilan flying squirrel (Petinomys crinitus)
- Travancore flying squirrel (Petinomys fuscocapillus)
- Whiskered flying squirrel (Petinomys genibarbis)
- Hagen's flying squirrel (Petinomys hageni)
- Siberut flying squirrel (Petinomys lugens)
- Mindanao flying squirrel (Petinomys mindanensis)
- Temminck's flying squirrel (Petinomys setosus)
- Vordermann's flying squirrel (Petinomys vordermanni)
