= Better Homes =

- Also known as: Better Gardens (2000)
- Genre: Lifestyle
- Presented by: Carol Vorderman
- Starring: Adrian and Neil Rayment (Better Homes); Kim Wilde (Better Gardens)
- Country of origin: United Kingdom
- Original language: English
- No. of series: 6 (Better Homes); 1 (Better Gardens)
- No. of episodes: 53 (inc. 2 specials) (Better Homes); 8 (Better Gardens)

Production
- Running time: 30 minutes (inc. adverts)
- Production company: Granada Television

Original release
- Network: ITV
- Release: 4 January 1999 – 8 July 2003

Better Homes is a lifestyle game show that was broadcast on ITV from 4 January 1999 to 8 July 2003 and was presented by Carol Vorderman.

== Format ==
Two houses were renovated for their owners. The one that increased in value after the televised renovation won for the owners an additional £5,000 (or, in the last series, a family holiday).

== Transmissions ==
=== Better Homes ===
| Series | Start date | End date | Episodes |
|---|---|---|---|
| 1 | 4 January 1999 | 12 March 1999 | 10 |
| 2 | 17 September 1999 | 29 October 1999 | 7 |
| 3 | 10 April 2000 | 3 July 2000 | 9 |
| 4 | 28 May 2001 | 14 August 2001 | 12 |
| 5 | 18 June 2002 | 1 August 2002 | 8 |
| 6 | 20 May 2003 | 8 July 2003 | 8 |

==== Specials ====
| Date | Entitle |
|---|---|
| 3 September 1999 | Revisited |
| 29 December 1999 | Christmas Special |

=== Better Gardens ===
| Series | Start date | End date | Episodes |
|---|---|---|---|
| 1 | 6 January 2000 | 13 February 2000 | 8 |
