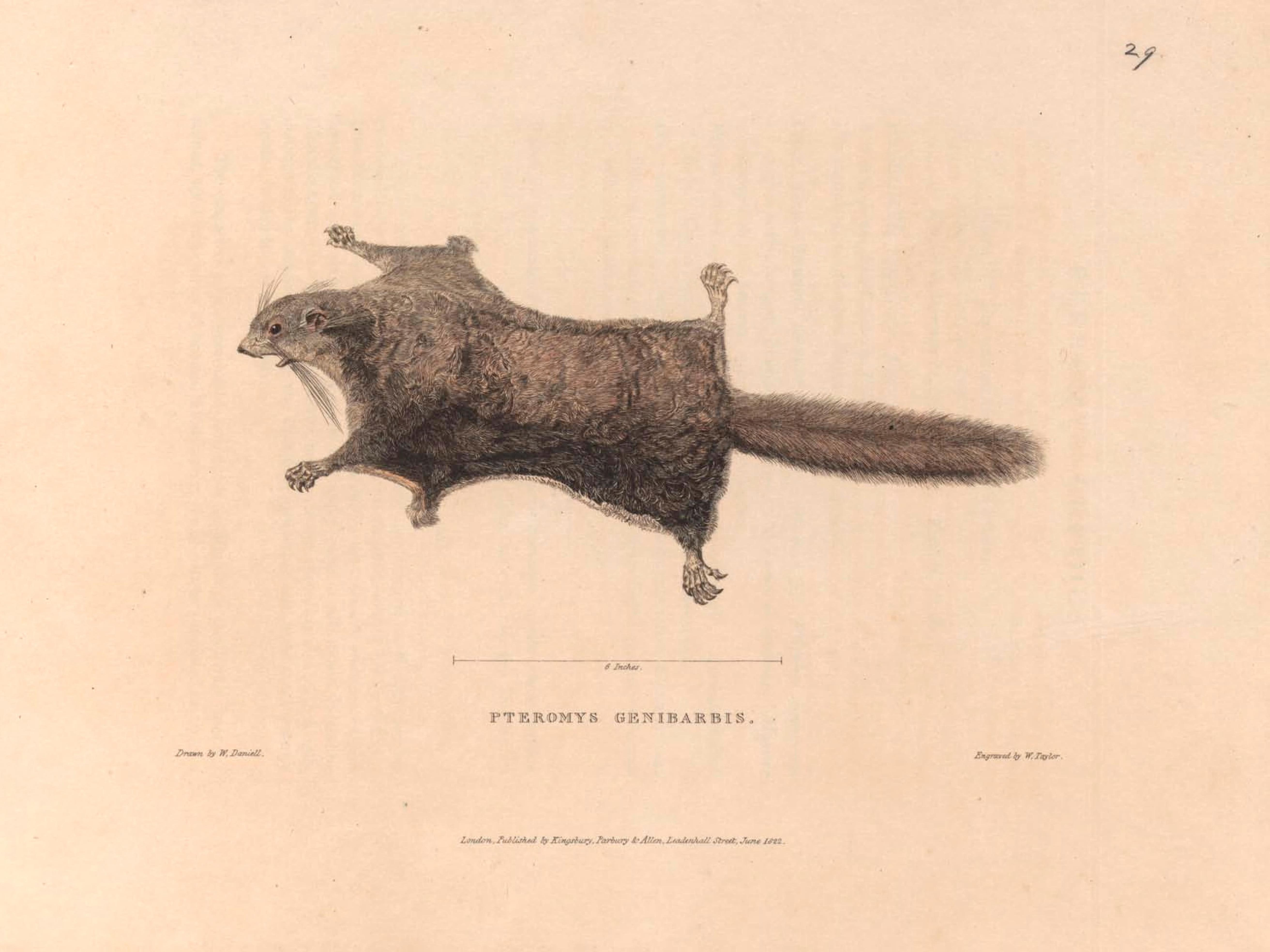

Conservation status
- Vulnerable (IUCN 3.1)

Scientific classification
- Kingdom: Animalia
- Phylum: Chordata
- Class: Mammalia
- Order: Rodentia
- Family: Sciuridae
- Genus: Petinomys
- Species: P. genibarbis

Binomial name
- Petinomys genibarbis (Horsfield, 1824)

= Whiskered flying squirrel =

Species of rodent

The whiskered flying squirrel (Petinomys genibarbis) is a species of flying squirrel. It is found in Indonesia and Malaysia.
