= Vordermann's flying squirrel =

Conservation status
- Vulnerable (IUCN 3.1)

Scientific classification
- Kingdom: Animalia
- Phylum: Chordata
- Class: Mammalia
- Order: Rodentia
- Family: Sciuridae
- Genus: Petinomys
- Species: P. vordermanni

Binomial name
- Petinomys vordermanni (Jentink, 1890)

Species of rodent

Vordermann's flying squirrel (Petinomys vordermanni) is a species of rodent in the family Sciuridae. It is found in Indonesia, Malaysia, and Myanmar. It was described in 1890 by the Dutch zoologist Fredericus Anna Jentink, who named it after its discoverer, the Dutch physician Adolphe Vorderman. (Note: [sic]. There is a discepancy between "Vorderman" and "Vordermann".)

== See also ==
- Vordermann's pipistrelle
