= Siberut flying squirrel =

Conservation status
- Vulnerable (IUCN 3.1)

Scientific classification
- Kingdom: Animalia
- Phylum: Chordata
- Class: Mammalia
- Order: Rodentia
- Family: Sciuridae
- Genus: Petinomys
- Species: P. lugens

Binomial name
- Petinomys lugens (Thomas, 1895)

Species of rodent

The Siberut flying squirrel (Petinomys lugens) is a species of rodent in the family Sciuridae. It is endemic to Indonesia. Its natural habitat is subtropical or tropical dry forests. It is threatened by habitat loss.
