= Food Glorious Food (TV series) =

British cooking competition show

- Genre: Cooking
- Presented by: Carol Vorderman
- Judges: Tom Parker Bowles; Loyd Grossman; Anne Harrison; Stacie Stewart; Andi Oliver (guest judge)
- Theme music composer: Banks & Wag
- Country of origin: United Kingdom
- Original language: English
- No. of series: 1
- No. of episodes: 9

Production
- Executive producers: Simon Cowell; Becky Clarke
- Running time: 60 minutes (inc. adverts)
- Production companies: Optomen; Syco Entertainment

Original release
- Network: ITV
- Release: 27 February – 24 April 2013

Related
- ITV Food

Food Glorious Food is a British cooking competition show that aired on ITV from 27 February to 24 April 2013, hosted by Carol Vorderman with judges Tom Parker Bowles, Loyd Grossman, Anne Harrison, Stacie Stewart and Andi Oliver who was a guest judge for the Harrogate heats. The competition, in which anyone of any age could enter, searched the country looking for the best home cooked dish, with the winner receiving £20,000 and their dish made and sold by Marks & Spencer.

An official Food Glorious Food cookery book was published by The Octopus Publishing Group on 25 February 2013 and is available to purchase online and from major book retailers. The book contains over 100 recipes, including all the regional heat winners and the overall series winner. The winning recipes from the heats and overall winning recipe will also be made available on the ITV website after appearing on the show.

== Format ==
Locations in which the regional heats were held.

The food competition searches the country looking for the best home cooked dish. Hosted by Carol Vorderman, the judging panel consists of Tom Parker Bowles, Loyd Grossman, Anne Harrison and Stacie Stewart, although Andi Oliver was a guest judge for the Harrogate heats. The winner received £20,000. Their dish also appeared on the shelves in Marks & Spencer stores nationwide with 40p from each dish sold going to Great Ormond Street Hospital.

=== Heats ===
In the regional heats, contestants served their dish to one of the four judges, who decided whether they liked it, if so the judge awards the contestant a rosette. After the judges have tried every dish they must then choose their favourite out of the dishes they've tasted. These four contestants make it through to Judges HQ, which is filmed in The Cotswolds, where all four judges taste each of the contestants dishes and vote on which one to send through to the Semi-Final stages.

=== Semi-finals ===
The semi-final stages were split between two shows, three contestants who previously made it through from the regional heats competed against each other on each of the two shows. They had to cook their dish for 150 people from the Women's Institute. Only one contestant from each show went on to compete in the final.

=== Final ===
In the Grand Final, both finalists made their way to London, where presenter Carol Vorderman revealed the news that their dishes were going to be trialed in stores across the country, thousands of tasters, thousands of votes, but only one winner. The two finalists worked with M&S to turn their recipes into a final product.

With dishes ready, thousands of samples were to be distributed around the country, each potential customer that tries the dish voted on whether or not they would buy the dish.

As the results from the trial runs were counted, the finalists headed back to London, surrounded by their family and friends. Rahila Hussain, a teacher from Huddersfield, was declared the winner with a chicken korma dish.

== Sponsorship ==
The show was sponsored by Anchor Butter, produced by Arla Foods UK.

== Reception ==
The show received generally negative reviews from critics after its premiere, who described it as "twee, wholesome fare styled like a summer fete" another described it as a "TV turkey". Many people have said that the programme should air in the daytime slot rather than the primetime.
