= Popworld Promotes =

Popworld Promotes is a competition run by Channel 4's Popworld television programme, searching for potentially talented unsigned bands in the UK. The competition runs a cycle every month, with the winner gaining the prize of an appearance on Saturday morning television on Channel 4. Bands upload a song, pictures and a biography, and members of the public are able to vote on the internet site, by texting in a vote or paying to download their favourite songs to award the bands with points.

The Superkings from Burnley were the last winners, however it needed pressure from the Sunday Mirror to ensure the band appeared on the show, This story developed further when the people running the Popworld website actually disappeared without fulfilling their obligations to award prize monies to The Superkings, when contacted a channel 4 director offered to help the band by introducing them to "the right sort of people" however as of 17 September 2009 the band have not had any further contact with channel 4.

On 27 April 2007 Channel 4 announced that they would not be recommissioning the show, and after 6 years on air, popworld ended on 14 July 2007.[2]

Previous winners of the Popworld Promotes competition include:

- The Superkings
- Trafficker
- The Tuckers
- Say
- Midair 91
- Bluebird Kid Clark
- Jo Harrop
- Fallen From View
- Bashphelt
- Page 44
- Area15
- Clear Blue Skies
- Chairmen Of The Bored
- Heist

Often, there are celebrity reviews of unsigned bands, and previous reviewers have included Gym Class Heroes and Boy Kill Boy; these reviewers are able to randomly select 10 acts from the chart and award points to them as well as writing a short review on their song.
