= Bob Hope Takes Risks =

Single by Rip Rig + Panic
- B-side: "Hey Mr E! A Gran Grin With a Shake of Smile"
- Released: 27 November 1981
- Genre: Post-punk
- Length: 3:53
- Label: Virgin
- Songwriter(s): Sean Oliver, Gareth Sager, Bruce Smith and Mark Springer
- Producer(s): Rip Rig + Panic

Rip Rig + Panic singles chronology
"Bob Hope Takes Risks" (1981)	"You're My Kind of Climate" (1982)

"Bob Hope Takes Risks" is a song by the English post-punk band Rip Rig + Panic. It was released as a single on 27 November 1981.

== Formats and track listing ==
All lyrics by Gareth Sager, all music by Sean Oliver, Gareth Sager, Bruce Smith and Mark Springer.

UK 7" single (VS 468)

1. "Bob Hope Takes Risks" – 3:53
2. "Hey Mr E! A Gran Grin With a Shake of Smile" – 5:11

UK 12" single (VS 468(12))

1. "Bob Hope Takes Risks" – 7:01
2. "Hey Mr E! A Gran Grin With a Shake of Smile" – 5:11

== Accolades ==
Year	Publication	Country	Accolade	Rank
1981	Rockerilla	Italy	Singles of the Year	13

== Personnel ==
Adapted from the Bob Hope Takes Risks liner notes.

Rip Rig + Panic

- Neneh Cherry – lead vocals
- Sean Oliver – bass guitar
- Gareth Sager – vocals, string arrangement, horn arrangement
- Bruce Smith – drums, percussion
- Mark Springer – piano

Additional musicians

- Woo Honeymoon – violin
- Debbie Holmes – cello
- Sarah Sarahandi – viola
- Alf Waite – trombone
- Dave "Flash" Wright – tenor saxophone

Production and additional personnel

- Dave Hunt – engineering
- Jill Mumford – design
- Rip Rig + Panic – production, design

== Release history ==
Region	Date	Label	Format	Catalog
United Kingdom	1981	Virgin	7", 12"	VS 468
