= Andi Oliver =

British cook, television and radio broadcaster, singer (born 1963)

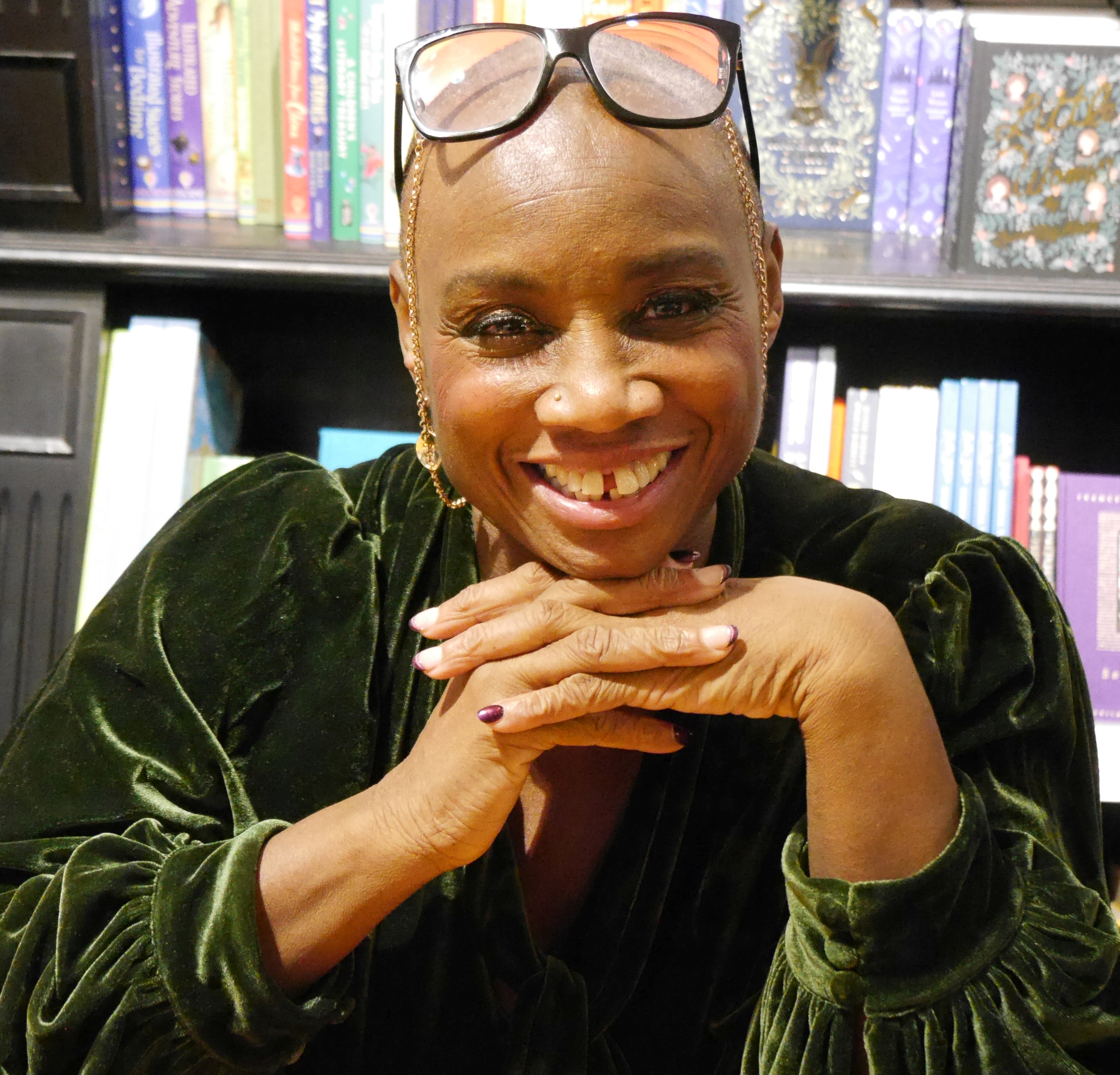
- Andi Oliver, Hatchards, London, 2023
- Born: Andrea Oliver; 26 May 1963 (age 62); Paddington, London, England
- Occupations: Chef; television broadcaster; radio broadcaster; singer
- Children: Miquita Oliver

Andrea Oliver (born 26 May 1963) is a British chef, television and radio broadcaster, and singer. She is notable for her appearances on the BBC TV cooking show Great British Menu.

== Early life ==
Oliver was born born 26 May 1963, in Paddington, London to Antiguan parents, spent a few years in Kent and Cyprus and was brought up in Bury St Edmunds, Suffolk, from the age of 10. Her father served in the Royal Air Force and was based at RAF Honington; her mother taught at a primary school in the town.

== Early career ==
Oliver is a former member of the band Rip Rig + Panic who appeared in an episode of Series 1 of The Young Ones. She used to co-host alongside Ice-T, the Channel 4 television show Baadasss TV, and for a time worked at BBC Radio London. She has also participated in the BBC's coverage of the Glastonbury Festival.

For four years she ran a successful ephemeral restaurant, The Moveable Feast. After being creative director of The Birdcage pub on London's Colombia Road, she launched her own restaurant at The Jackdaw and Star, a renovated pub in the heart of Homerton. She opened her award-winning restaurant, Andi's, in 2016, and in 2020 created her newest food project entitled Wadadli Kitchen.

She is best known for her appearances on the BBC TV cooking show Great British Menu. She is the author of the book The Pepperpot Diaries: Stories From My Caribbean Table, published in 2023.

== Other music projects ==
After 1983, Andi became involved in Kalimba, an African-inspired band. In 1990 she joined forces with her brother, forming the Mighty Hog.

In April 2007, she began presenting a six-part cookery show, Neneh and Andi Dish it Up, with her friend Neneh Cherry for BBC2.

== Projects ==
- Host of Truth About Food
- Host of The Selector, a radio show for the British Council
- Host of BBC Four first-ever Radio 3 World Music Awards
- Took part in the charity performance of The Vagina Monologues at the Royal Albert Hall
- Took part in the Changing Cityscapes series for the BBC.
- In 2009 Oliver took part in BBC flagship drama No. 1 Ladies Detective Agency, set in Botswana.
- In summer 2012, she was a guest judge on the TV show Food Glorious Food, presented by Carol Vorderman during the Harrogate Regional Heats, first broadcast on 27 February 2013.
- In summer 2014, she opened her own kitchen, Sugarshack.
- Regular panelist on The Kitchen Cabinet on BBC Radio 4 alongside Jay Rayner, Henry Dimbleby and Angela Hartnett
- Co-hosts Food Networks The Big Eat alongside Andy Bates and Ching He Huang
- Co-host of BBC's Christmas Kitchen with Matt Tebbutt – December 2016
- Took part in Eight Go Rallying: The Road To Saigon in 2018 with her daughter Miquita Oliver. They drove a 1959 Morris Minor.
- Replaced Prue Leith as permanent judge on Great British Menu with Matthew Fort and Oliver Peyton, but then stepped away from the judge role and replaced Susan Calman as presenter
- 2022, documentary, The Caribbean with Andi and Miquita.
- 2024, host of culinary series, Andi Oliver's Fabulous Feast.

== Personal life ==
Oliver has a daughter, television presenter Miquita Oliver, from a previous relationship with Robin Baillie, a Scottish art history teacher. Her brother Sean died in 1990 of sickle cell anaemia aged 27. She lives in Wanstead, East London with her partner Garfield Hackett.

Andi is allergic to shellfish.

== Book ==
- The Pepperpot Diaries: Stories From My Caribbean Table, photography by Robert Billington (DK, 27 April 2023), ISBN 9780241560211
