= The Big Eat =

British television documentary

The Big Eat is a one-hour factual entertainment documentary shown on Channel 4 and produced by Twofour which follows the search for and training of a British Champion to compete in the Competitive Eating World Championships in New York City.

The competition was won by Rob "Baby-Face" Burns, a 34-year-old from Wolverhampton. He ate 18 mini-pork pies in 12 minutes, but came in last at the 2005 IFOCE/Nathan's Famous competition at Coney Island, where he consumed 10 hot-dogs. Andy Kocen (a stockbroker known as, "The Doctor" on account of his medical degree) finished second by only one pork pie, soundly beating Jimmy "Oyster" Glackin, one-time holder of the Guinness world record for oyster consumption (a pint and a dozen oysters in 13 seconds).
