= Mindanao flying squirrel =

Conservation status
- Least Concern (IUCN 3.1)

Scientific classification
- Kingdom: Animalia
- Phylum: Chordata
- Class: Mammalia
- Order: Rodentia
- Family: Sciuridae
- Genus: Petinomys
- Species: P. mindanensis

Binomial name
- Petinomys mindanensis Rabor, 1939
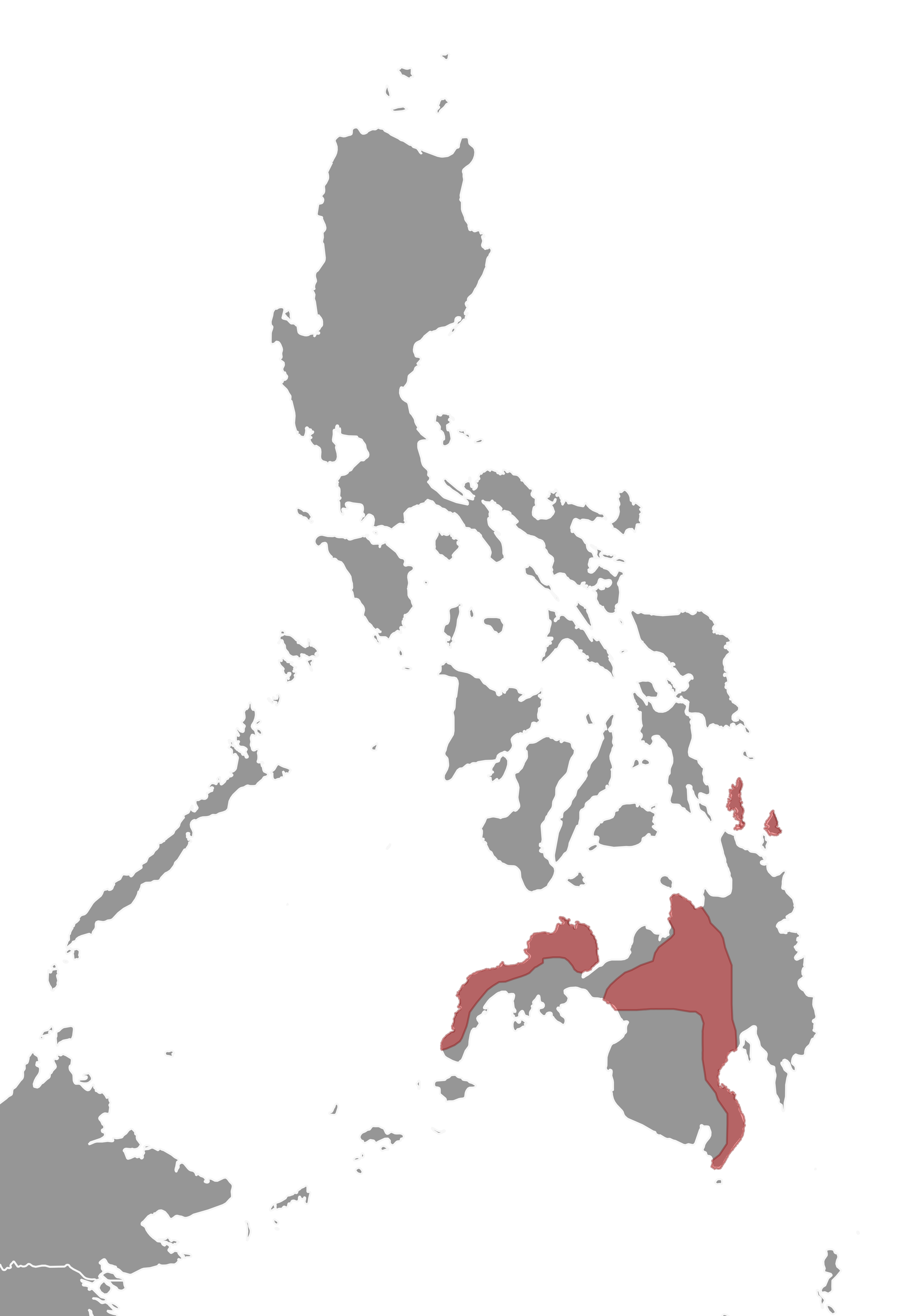

Species of rodent

The Mindanao flying squirrel (Petinomys mindanensis) is a common species of flying squirrel that is endemic to the Philippines.
