= T4 (Channel 4) =

Teen programme block on Channel 4

- Logo used from 2005
- Network: Channel 4 E4 (2001, 2012)
- Launched: 25 October 1998; 27 years ago
- Closed: 29 December 2012; 13 years ago
- Country of origin: United Kingdom
- Owner: Channel Four Television Corporation
- Key people: Henrietta Conrad; Sebastian Grant; Cath Lovesey; Sangeeta Bhaskar
- Headquarters: Channel 4 Headquarters (1998–2006); Riverside Studios (2006–2009); Princess Productions Studios (2009–2012)
- Major broadcasting contracts: At It Productions (2002–2007); Eyeworks (2007–2009); Princess Productions (2009–2012)
- Format: Youth programming
- Running time: 350 minutes (T4 Saturday); 480 minutes (T4 Sunday)
- Original language: English

T4 was a programming block on Channel 4 (T4 Saturday usually 9 am until 2 pm) and E4 (T4 Sunday usually 9 am until 5 pm) that was targeted at the 16–24 age group. It also aired on weekdays in the school holidays and often featured studio segments such as interviews with celebrity guests, live music and phone-in competitions interwoven by in-vision continuity presenters linking to a selection of both British and imported shows.

On 12 October 2012, Channel 4 announced that it would be axing T4 as part of a move to refresh the network's youth programming at the end of December 2012. The show ended on 29 December 2012.

== Early history ==
T4's original logo

Early on in T4's run, programmes aimed at children often aired in addition to the content aimed at older viewers, with shows such as CatDog and 2 Stupid Dogs appearing in the early schedule of the strand. Around 2001, this was dropped and the strand refocused entirely towards the teen/youth market.

T4 had a separate station identification on screen graphic from Channel 4 and E4. Channel 4 originally produced the strand in-house until 2002, when production was passed onto independent companies At It Productions (which later merged with Eyeworks UK in 2007) before the contract was awarded to Princess Productions. For the first few months of T4's life, its idents consisted of an animated spaceman like character. In 1999, this character instead appeared on the idents during the early morning pre-school shows, in addition to the weekend children's programmes that fell outside the T4 strand. These idents continued in use until 2004.

=== T4 on E4, 2001 ===
After E4's launch in 2001, T4 initially also had a slot on the channel, however this was short lived. It also had an equally short lived Friday evening slot on Channel 4. Following the sale of Quiz Call by Channel 4, it was rumoured that a T4 channel was one of the proposals to fill the vacant slot on Freeview (and subsequently on satellite and cable). However, the plan is also thought to have been rejected by director of television Kevin Lygo, as the slot was filled by Film4 +1 (now replaced, in turn, by Channel 4 +1).

== Later years ==
Initially broadcast only on Sundays, the success of T4 saw the strand subsequently extended to include a Saturday block.

In more recent years, T4 had provided Channel 4 a broadcast window of programmes that are also broadcast in primetime slots on E4, such as The Big Bang Theory. In addition, following Channel 4's acquisition of terrestrial broadcast rights to The Simpsons, the series began to feature regularly within T4. Friends featured regularly within T4 until Channel 4 relinquished the rights to the sitcom in 2011.

Until 25 March 2012, T4 aired on Channel 4 both Saturday and Sunday. To make way for the introduction of Sunday Brunch in March 2012, T4 Sunday was later moved to run on E4. T4 Saturday remained on Channel 4 and some programmes that previously appeared within the T4 block, such as The Simpsons, remained on Channel 4 on Sunday afternoons.

== Closure of T4 ==
Vernon Kay, Dermot O'Leary, Miquita Oliver and Alexa Chung returned for the last show on 29 December 2012 alongside current presenters Matt Edmondson, Nick Grimshaw, Jameela Jamil, Georgie Okell and Will Best.

== T4 on the Beach ==
T4 also staged an annual summer concert, T4 on the Beach, in the resort of Weston-super-Mare (for its first two years in 2003 and 2004, it was held in Great Yarmouth under the name Pop Beach), and previous musical acts that have appeared include McFly, Calvin Harris, Little Boots, and The Zutons. The concert in July 2010 was the sixth year running that the event had taken place in Weston-super-Mare which featured Dizzee Rascal and Florence and the Machine, among others. After the strand's cancellation, there was going to be a replacement titled Summer Sets on the Beach which would air live on ITV2 on 31 August 2013, but it was axed due to a lack of ticket sales.

== T4 Stars Of... ==
Normally bookended at the tail end of the year, the T4 Stars Of... concert was broadcast live from Earls Court. The event was first held in 2009 and since then had become an annual fixture in the T4 events calendar. The Stars Of... title usually preceded the year in which it was being held e.g. Stars of 2010, as it was widely regarded as the replacement show for the now defunct Smash Hits Poll Winners Party that T4 broadcast from 2001 to 2005.

2009 line-up

- Kasabian
- JLS
- Sugababes
- La Roux
- Calvin Harris
- N-Dubz
- Alexandra Burke
- Florence and the Machine
- Example
- Ke$ha
- Paloma Faith
- The Saturdays
- Chipmunk
- Tinchy Stryder

2010 line-up

- Alexandra Burke
- Tinie Tempah
- Pixie Lott
- Professor Green
- Example
- Ellie Goulding
- N-Dubz
- Olly Murs
- JLS
- The Wanted
- Mark Ronson
- Jason Derulo
- The Saturdays
- Roll Deep
- Devlin

2011 line-up

- Labrinth
- Matt Cardle
- Emeli Sandé
- Cher Lloyd
- Rizzle Kicks
- Tinchy Stryder
- Dappy
- Example
- Pixie Lott
- Ed Sheeran
- Wretch 32
- The Wanted
- Professor Green
- DJ Fresh

== Presenters ==
| Presenter | Tenure | 1998 | 1999 | 2000 | 2001 | 2002 | 2003 | 2004 | 2005 | 2006 | 2007 | 2008 | 2009 | 2010 | 2011 | 2012 |
|---|---|---|---|---|---|---|---|---|---|---|---|---|---|---|---|---|
| Dermot O'Leary | 1998–2001 | | | | | —N/a | —N/a | —N/a | —N/a | —N/a | —N/a | —N/a | —N/a | —N/a | —N/a | —N/a |
| Omar Gurnah | 1998–1999 | | | —N/a | —N/a | —N/a | —N/a | —N/a | —N/a | —N/a | —N/a | —N/a | —N/a | —N/a | —N/a | —N/a |
| Fran Lee | 1998–1999 | | | —N/a | —N/a | —N/a | —N/a | —N/a | —N/a | —N/a | —N/a | —N/a | —N/a | —N/a | —N/a | —N/a |
| Margherita Taylor | 1999–2001 | —N/a | | | | —N/a | —N/a | —N/a | —N/a | —N/a | —N/a | —N/a | —N/a | —N/a | —N/a | —N/a |
| Ben Shephard | 1999–2000 | —N/a | | | —N/a | —N/a | —N/a | —N/a | —N/a | —N/a | —N/a | —N/a | —N/a | —N/a | —N/a | —N/a |
| June Sarpong | 2000–2007 | —N/a | —N/a | | | | | | | | | —N/a | —N/a | —N/a | —N/a | —N/a |
| Vernon Kay | 2000–2005 | —N/a | —N/a | | | | | | | —N/a | —N/a | —N/a | —N/a | —N/a | —N/a | —N/a |
| Steve Jones | 2003–2010 | —N/a | —N/a | —N/a | —N/a | —N/a | | | | | | | | | —N/a | —N/a |
| Simon Amstell | 2003–2006 | —N/a | —N/a | —N/a | —N/a | —N/a | | | | | —N/a | —N/a | —N/a | —N/a | —N/a | —N/a |
| MC Harvey | 2003–2004 | —N/a | —N/a | —N/a | —N/a | —N/a | | | —N/a | —N/a | —N/a | —N/a | —N/a | —N/a | —N/a | —N/a |
| Anthony Crank | 2004–2005 | —N/a | —N/a | —N/a | —N/a | —N/a | —N/a | | | —N/a | —N/a | —N/a | —N/a | —N/a | —N/a | —N/a |
| Miquita Oliver | 2006–2010 | —N/a | —N/a | —N/a | —N/a | —N/a | —N/a | —N/a | —N/a | | | | | | —N/a | —N/a |
| Dave Berry | 2006–2007 | —N/a | —N/a | —N/a | —N/a | —N/a | —N/a | —N/a | —N/a | | | —N/a | —N/a | —N/a | —N/a | —N/a |
| Mark Boardman | 2006–2007 | —N/a | —N/a | —N/a | —N/a | —N/a | —N/a | —N/a | —N/a | | | —N/a | —N/a | —N/a | —N/a | —N/a |
| Rick Edwards | 2007–2011 | —N/a | —N/a | —N/a | —N/a | —N/a | —N/a | —N/a | —N/a | —N/a | | | | | | —N/a |
| Alex Zane | 2007–2008 | —N/a | —N/a | —N/a | —N/a | —N/a | —N/a | —N/a | —N/a | —N/a | | | —N/a | —N/a | —N/a | —N/a |
| Alexa Chung | 2008–2009 | —N/a | —N/a | —N/a | —N/a | —N/a | —N/a | —N/a | —N/a | —N/a | —N/a | | | —N/a | —N/a | —N/a |
| Jameela Jamil | 2009–2012 | —N/a | —N/a | —N/a | —N/a | —N/a | —N/a | —N/a | —N/a | —N/a | —N/a | —N/a | | | | |
| Nick Grimshaw | 2010–2012 | —N/a | —N/a | —N/a | —N/a | —N/a | —N/a | —N/a | —N/a | —N/a | —N/a | —N/a | —N/a | | | |
| Georgie Okell | 2010–2012 | —N/a | —N/a | —N/a | —N/a | —N/a | —N/a | —N/a | —N/a | —N/a | —N/a | —N/a | —N/a | | | |
| Will Best | 2011–2012 | —N/a | —N/a | —N/a | —N/a | —N/a | —N/a | —N/a | —N/a | —N/a | —N/a | —N/a | —N/a | —N/a | | |
| Matt Edmondson | 2011–2012 | —N/a | —N/a | —N/a | —N/a | —N/a | —N/a | —N/a | —N/a | —N/a | —N/a | —N/a | —N/a | —N/a | | |

== Executive staff ==
T4's executives were Henrietta Conrad (executive producer) and Sebastian Grant (series producer) for Princess Productions, and Cath Lovesey (series editor) and Sangeeta Bhaskar (Channel 4 executive) for Channel 4.
