= Mark Springer =

British pianist and composer

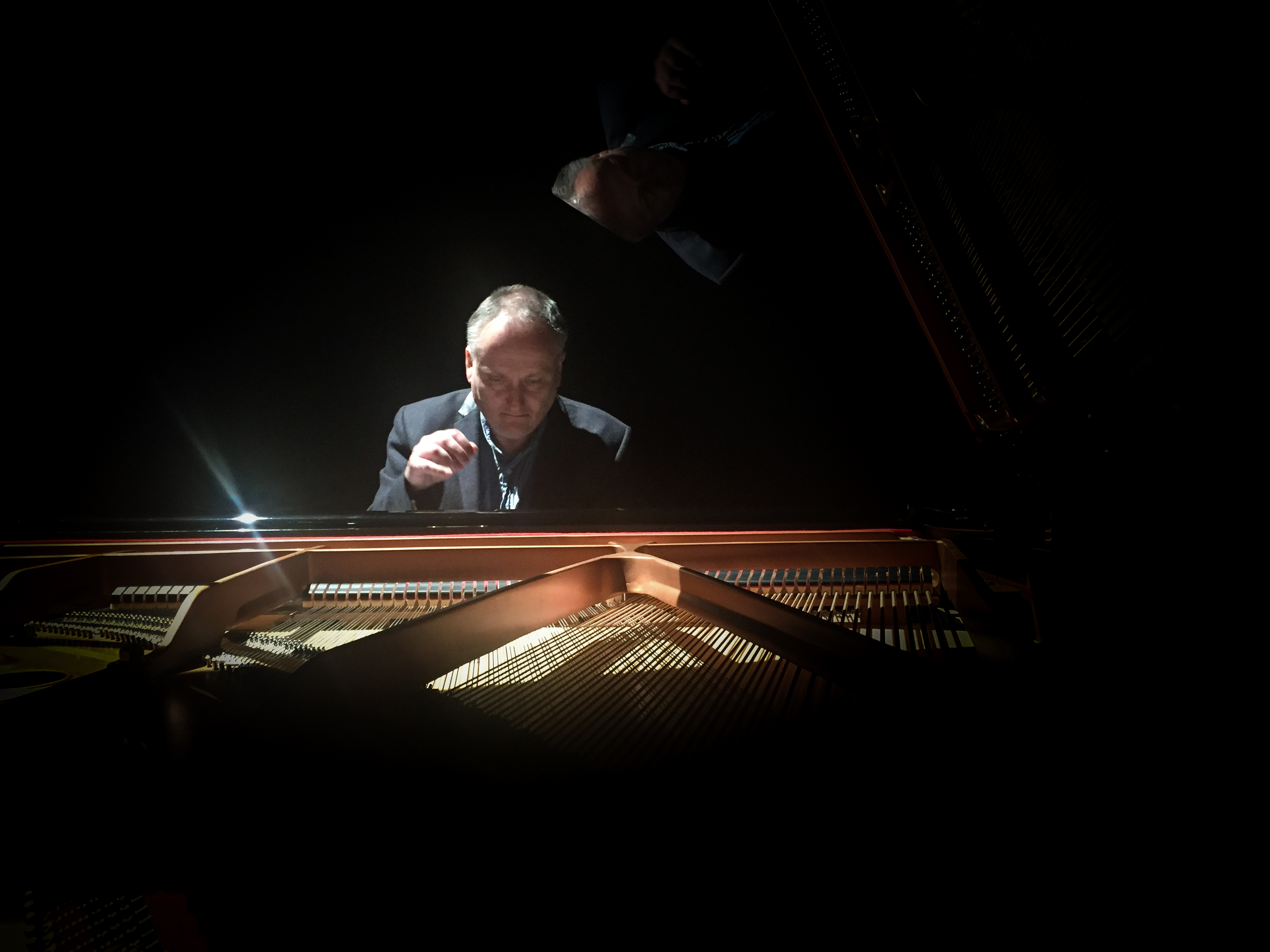
- Springer in 2017

Background information
- Genres: Post-punk; jazz; classical
- Occupations: Musician; painter
- Instrument: Piano
- Years active: 1980–present
- Labels: Exit; Virgin
- Formerly of: Rip Rig + Panic
- Website: markspringer.net

Mark Springer is a British pianist and composer. Springer first came to public attention in the group Rip Rig + Panic. This group also featured the singer Neneh Cherry, Sean Oliver, Gareth Sager, and Bruce Smith. During his time with the group, started his exploration of piano performances and compositions. Springer has composed for piano, string quartets, opera, and other ensembles, and owns his own record label.

== Biography ==
Mark Springer first began playing gigs with the experimental rock band The Pop Group. The group's members had been Springer's schoolmates. In 1981, Springer formed Rip Rig + Panic with Gareth Sager and Bruce Smith, two former members of Pop Group. After Rip Rig + Panic disbanded in 1983, Springer began recording as a solo artist. His debut album titled Piano was released in 1984 and consisted of numerous solo piano recordings.

== Discography ==
with Rip Rig + Panic

- God (1981)
- I Am Cold (1982)
- Attitude (1983)
- Circa Rip Rig + Panic (2017) – Recorded by Mark Springer and members of Rip Rig + Panic with singer from Velvet Underground, Nico.

Solo

- Piano (1984)
- Swans And Turtles – with Sarah Sarhandi (1990)
- Menu (1991)
- Eye (1998)
- Capture (1999)
- Nature/Music/Food/The Stars and The Planets – featuring drummer Clive Deamer (2000)
- Metonic: Music for Solo Piano & Piano Quartet (2002)
- Solo Situation (2004)
- E.T.A. N.Y.C.: Jazz Standards and Original Compositions (2005)
- Diving (2018)
- Menu 2 (2016)
- The Watching Bird (2017)
- The Rip Rig + Panic Piano Solos (2018)

Collaborations

- Triptych by the Pax Trio with Mark Springer, David Wright and Sirish Kumar (2006)
- First Light by the Pax Trio with Mark Springer, David Wright and Sirish Kumar (2009)
- Aparat – duo with Mark Springer and Arthur Jeffes of Penguin Cafe (2016)
- Sleep of Reason – with Neil Tennant and the Sacconi Quartet (2025)

Scores

- Weekend – feature film by Barnaby Southcombe
- London Kills Me – with Sarah Sarhandi; feature film by Hanif Kureishi (1991)
- The Fortunes and Misfortunes of Moll Flanders – with Jim Parker; Granada Television series (1996)
- The Fallout Guy – BBC drama, directed by Paul Tickell (1991)
- The House – film short by Sam Hodgkin
- ITV Documentary on the surrealist painter Leonora Carrington
- BBC documentary film on Mark Springer and his father, the artist, Michael Springer
- Das Erde – documentary for German TV
- Fatto a Mano – film short by S. Killery
- L'Amour Fou – French art house documentary
- The Potentino Concerto – film short by Agnieszka Biolik
