= Carol Vorderman =

Welsh media personality (born 1960)

Carol Vorderman MBE HonFIET
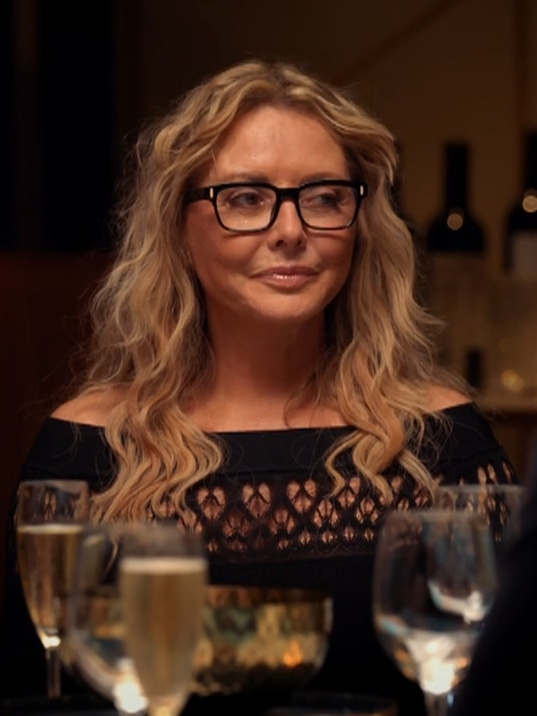
- Vorderman in 2018
- Born: Carol Jean Vorderman; 24 December 1960 (age 65); Bedford, Bedfordshire, England
- Education: Sidney Sussex College, Cambridge (BA)
- Occupations: Broadcaster; media personality; writer
- Years active: 1982–present
- Spouses: Christopher Mather (m. 1985; div. 1986) Patrick King (m. 1990; div. 2000)
- Partner: Des Kelly (2001–2006)
- Children: 2
- Relatives: Adolphe Vorderman (great-grandfather)

Carol Jean Vorderman (born 24 December 1960) is a Welsh broadcaster, media personality, and writer. Her media career began when she joined the Channel 4 game show Countdown, appearing with Richard Whiteley from 1982 until his death in 2005, and subsequently with Des Lynam and Des O'Connor, before leaving in 2008.

While appearing on Countdown, Vorderman began presenting shows for ITV, including How 2 (1990–1996), Better Homes (1999–2003) and The Pride of Britain Awards (1999–present), as well as guest hosting shows, such as Have I Got News for You (2004–2006) and The Sunday Night Project (2006). She was a presenter on the ITV talk show Loose Women from 2011 until 2014. She has also appeared as a contestant on reality shows, including Strictly Come Dancing (2004), I'm a Celebrity...Get Me Out of Here! (2016) and The Great Celebrity Bake-Off (2020), winning the last. From 2022 to 2023, Vorderman was a news-reviewer for This Morning.

Vorderman was honoured as a Member of the Order of the British Empire (MBE) for services to broadcasting in the Queen's Birthday Honours in June 2000. She has also worked as a newspaper columnist and nominal author of educational and diet books. From 2023 to 2024, Vorderman presented her own show for the talk radio station LBC.

== Early life and education ==
Vorderman was born on 24 December 1960 in Bedford, Bedfordshire, the youngest of three children of a Dutch father, Anton Vorderman (1920–2007), and a Welsh mother, Edwina Jean Davies (1928–2017). Her parents separated three weeks after her birth, and her mother took the family back to her home town of Prestatyn, Flintshire (now in Denbighshire), North Wales, where Vorderman and her brother and sister grew up. Vorderman did not see her father again until she was 42. In 1970, her mother remarried, separating ten years later. Vorderman's father remarried; his wife died in the early 1990s.

Vorderman was educated at Blessed Edward Jones Catholic High School in nearby Rhyl. In 1978, aged 17, she began studying engineering at Sidney Sussex College, Cambridge. She left with a third-class degree, a result which she has described as having been "disappointing". Vorderman did not trace the Dutch side of her family until 2007 (as part of the BBC genealogy programme Who Do You Think You Are?). It was only then that she discovered that her father had been an active member of the Dutch resistance during the Nazi occupation. He died while the programme was being filmed. Her great-grandfather Adolphe Vorderman played a key role in the discovery of vitamins.

== Early career ==
Vorderman initially found employment as a junior civil engineer at Dinorwig Power Station in Llanberis, Wales, and later as a graduate management trainee in Leeds. In her spare time, she was briefly a backing singer with friend Lindsay Forrest in the Leeds-based pop group Dawn Chorus and the Blue Tits, fronted by radio DJ Liz Kershaw during the early 1980s. The group recorded, among other songs, a version of The Undertones' hit "Teenage Kicks" (one of the tracks Vorderman had to identify during the "intros round" when she appeared on Never Mind the Buzzcocks in December 2009; the series often includes questions from contestants' pasts).

During 1984–85, Vorderman made regular appearances on the Peter Levy show on Radio Aire, appearing mid-morning to read a story for pre-school children. In the mid-1980s, Vorderman worked part-time in the Information Services Department of the UK Atomic Energy Authority, principally in the production of in-house video programmes.

== Television career ==
=== Countdown ===
==== 1982–2008 ====
Vorderman's mother noticed an advertisement in The Yorkshire Post asking for "a woman with good mathematical skills" to appear as co-host on a quiz show for the fledgling fourth terrestrial channel. She submitted an application on behalf of her daughter, then aged 21. Vorderman appeared on Countdown from the show's inception in 1982 until 2008.

Initially, Vorderman's only contribution to the show was the numbers game, and she formed part of a five-person presentation team, billed as one of the "vital statisticians" along with Linda Barrett. However, over the following years, the team was pared down, and Vorderman began handling tiles for both the letters and numbers games. Vorderman thus became a new type of game show hostess, revealing her intellectual ability by carrying out fast and accurate arithmetic calculations during the numbers game to reach an exact solution if neither contestant was able to do so. Her lasting success on the show led to her becoming one of the highest-paid women in Britain, ultimately earning her an estimated £1 million per year.

==== After Richard Whiteley ====
In June 2005, the producers of Countdown asked Vorderman if she wanted to fill the role of main presenter vacated by the recently deceased Richard Whiteley. Vorderman declined, and a search for a new presenter began while the show went into a four-month hiatus. In October 2005, Des Lynam replaced Whiteley and co-hosted with Vorderman. In January 2007, Des O'Connor replaced Lynam while Vorderman continued to co-host the show. On 25 July 2008, after 26 unbroken years with the show, it was announced that Vorderman was stepping down from Countdown. She later said she had resigned after failing to agree terms for a new contract, and it was reported that she had been asked to take a cut of 90% from her previous salary, estimated as £900,000. She had considered leaving the show when the show's original host Richard Whiteley died in 2005, but remained on the show when Lynam took over, and until 2008 when his eventual replacement O'Connor announced he was also to step down as the show's host. Vorderman and O'Connor both left the show in December 2008.

Vorderman recorded her last Countdown show on 13 November 2008 which was broadcast on 12 December 2008. Both of her children were in the audience, together with many of the previous guests from "Dictionary Corner". After the prizegiving at the end of the show, Des O'Connor was presented with a bouquet of flowers by the show's lexicographer Susie Dent, and Vorderman received one from Gyles Brandreth. She was too moved to complete her farewells. A special show, One Last Consonant, Please Carol, hosted by Brandreth and featuring Vorderman's highs and lows during the 26 years of the show, was also filmed and transmitted just before her final Countdown appearance.

After leaving Countdown, Vorderman continued to contribute her column to the British magazine Reveal. Channel 4 admitted in 2009 that all Countdown presenters had always worn earpieces, and that producers would "sometimes supply extra ideas as there are often multiple options to ensure viewers are given the best possible answers." A source close to Vorderman denied that she had worn an earpiece or cheated in her mental arithmetic answers.

=== Loose Women ===
In July 2011, Vorderman and Sally Lindsay were tipped for roles on Loose Women following ITV's decision to axe Kate Thornton and Zoë Tyler from the programme. This was later confirmed, with Vorderman presenting her first live show on 5 September 2011. From September 2011 to June 2013, Vorderman and fellow Loose Women host Andrea McLean hosted two to three shows per week. However, after the show returned from its summer break in September 2013, she began to host one episode per week, with McLean anchoring the remaining four. On 3 October 2013, it was announced that former Loose Women presenter Kaye Adams would be returning to the show later in the year and Ruth Langsford would join the panel in January 2014. Adams, Langsford and Andrea McLean hosted the show in rotation, with Vorderman remaining as an occasional presenter on the programme, usually presenting one episode a fortnight.

On 14 July 2014, Vorderman announced her departure as a presenter on Loose Women. Vorderman explained:

I am getting into the hard work for my planning and training to go round the world next year. In the first two years on Loose I did over 100 days a year but in the last year I have only managed just over 20 days because I kept having to cancel days due to other work commitments. I tried appearing just once a week up until Christmas and I just couldn't do it. I write a lot of educational books and have a big maths website so my time is spent with those too. I like to do things properly and it's unfair to commit to something half-heartedly.

=== Other television work ===
Vorderman is the presenter of the annual Pride of Britain Awards, which are televised by ITV. She began hosting the awards when they were introduced in 1999. In 2004, Vorderman took part in the second series of Strictly Come Dancing, partnered with professional dancer Paul Killick. She was the second celebrity to be eliminated from the show. She guest presented Have I Got News for You in 2004 and 2006 and also presented an episode of The Sunday Night Project. Vorderman guest presented 15 episodes of Lorraine in 2011. She presented the ITV Food show Food Glorious Food in 2013. In March 2013, Vorderman recorded an ITV gameshow pilot called Revolution. On 29 June 2013, it was announced that the show had been "scrapped" by ITV.

In 2016, Vorderman finished in eighth place in the sixteenth series of I'm a Celebrity...Get Me Out of Here! On 7 April 2020, Vorderman appeared on The Great Stand Up to Cancer Bake Off and won. Broadcast on S4C on 19 April 2020, Vorderman took part in the show Iaith ar Daith ('Language Road Trip') and, with the help of Owain Wyn Evans, learned Welsh and completed various challenges in the language. An extra episode, Iaith ar Daith 'Dolig ('Language Road Trip: Christmas') was broadcast at the end of 2020, interviewing each of the celebrities about whether they were still making use of their Welsh and the opportunities they had had to use Welsh during lockdown.

In 2023, Vorderman appeared in I'm a Celebrity... South Africa. On 16 June 2023, she appeared as herself in Episode 1 of the BBC One comedy Queen of Oz. Vorderman is seen and heard on her radio programme questioning the outrageous antics of spoiled spare to the British crown, Princess Georgiana, played by Catherine Tate.

=== Filmography ===
==== Television ====
Year	Title	Role	Channel
1982–2008	Countdown	Vital statistician Co-presenter (4,832 episodes)	Channel 4
1987–1989	Take Nobody's Word for It	Co-presenter	BBC1
1990–1996, 1998	How 2	Co-presenter	CITV (ITV)
1993	World Chess Championship	Co-presenter	Channel 4
1994	Tomorrow's World	Co-presenter	BBC1
1994	Arthur C. Clarke's Mysterious Universe	Narrator	ITV
1996	Entertainment Today	Presenter	ITV
1996	Out of this World	Presenter	BBC1
1997	Hot Gadgets	Presenter	BBC1
1997	The Antiques Inspectors	Presenter	BBC1
1997	This is Your Life	Herself, Guest of Honour	BBC1
1998	Points of View	Presenter	
1998	What Will They Think of Next	Presenter	ITV
1999	Dream House	Main presenter	BBC One
1999–2003	Better Homes	Presenter	ITV
1999–present	Pride of Britain Awards	Presenter	ITV
2000	Star Lives	Presenter	ITV
2001–2002	Britain's Brainiest Kid	Presenter	ITV
2004	Strictly Come Dancing	Contestant	BBC One
2004, 2006, 2023, 2024	Have I Got News for You	Guest host, guest panellist	BBC One
2005–2006	Carol's Big Brain Game	Co-presenter	Sky One
2006	The Sunday Night Project	Guest presenter	Channel 4
2008	One Last Consonant, Please Carol	Subject	Channel 4
2009	Would I Lie To You	Contestant	BBC One
2011, 2018–2019, 2022	Lorraine	Guest presenter (26 episodes)	ITV
2011–2014	Loose Women	Presenter	ITV
2013	Food Glorious Food	Presenter	ITV
2016	I'm a Celebrity...Get Me Out of Here!	Participant	ITV
2020	Iaith ar Daith	Participant	S4C
2020–present	The Wheel	Expert (multiple episodes)	BBC One
2021	Carol Vorderman: Closer to Home	Presenter	BBC One Wales
2021	Great British Menu	Guest judge; Series 16 – The Finals: Main Course	BBC Two
2021	Pride of Britain Awards	Co-host	ITV
2022	Beat the Chasers	Contestant	ITV
2022–2023	This Morning	News Reviewer (2022–2023)	ITV
2023	Taskmaster's New Year Treat	Contestant	Channel 4
2023	I'm a Celebrity... South Africa	Contestant	ITV
2023	Queen of Oz	Herself	BBC One
2023	RuPaul's Drag Race UK	Herself; Guest judge (Series 5)	BBC Three
2023	Steph's Packed Lunch	Herself; Guest host (one episode)	Channel 4
2023	The Masked Singer	Contestant / Reindeer (one episode)	ITV 1
2024	Cooking with the Stars	Contestant	ITV
2025	Celebrity Puzzling	Team captain	5

== Radio ==
After leaving the BBC in 2023, Vorderman was an occasional guest host on LBC. In January 2024, two months after her BBC departure, she was to present her own show from 4pm to 7pm on Sunday afternoons. She said "I'll be using my voice – as you might expect – to cause a commotion. I won't be shy to say things that others won't and I'll hold the corrupt to account without fear or favour." Vorderman announced on 11 October 2024 that she would leave LBC following a "health scare".

== Other work ==
=== Journalism ===
Vorderman has had newspaper columns in The Daily Telegraph, and in the Daily Mirror on Internet topics. She has written books on Detox diets. Her No. 1 bestseller was Detox For Life, produced in collaboration with Ko Chohan and Anita Bean and published by Virgin Books, which sold over a million copies. Many school textbooks have been published under her name, chiefly by Dorling Kindersley in series such as English Made Easy, Maths Made Easy, Science Made Easy and How to Pass National Curriculum Maths.

=== Commercial ventures ===
Vorderman expanded her business ventures, launching a number of Sudoku products. In March 2007, she launched a brain-training game called Carol Vorderman's Mind Aerobics together with BSkyB. Also in 2007, she released a video game for PlayStation 2 and PlayStation Portable in the United States entitled Carol Vorderman's Sudoku. In 2007, Vorderman did TV commercials for the frozen food chain Farmfoods – advertising "Chippy Chips for £1" and "Cadbury's Cones for 99p".

In the autumn of 2008, soon after she completed her final regular Countdown show, Vorderman announced a new commercial venture, her own property development and sales company that would specialise in overseas holiday and retirement homes in the Caribbean, including the Bahamas, and Spain. It was called Carol Vorderman Overseas Homes Limited. She saw the company as a natural extension of her own experiences in buying and selling properties over recent years and was aiming at a target market of "families aged 35 plus". However, due to the 2008 financial crisis, the venture proved short-lived. During March 2009, Vorderman publicly withdrew her name from the firm, which suspended trading soon afterwards. On 2 March 2010, Vorderman publicly launched her new commercial venture of an online mathematics coaching system for 4- to 12-year-old children under the name of the MathsFactor.

=== Endorsement controversy ===
Vorderman had maintained a long-standing endorsement of the debt consolidation company FirstPlus, an association that ceased in 2007. In 2006, the charity Credit Action attempted to highlight the potential dangers of debt consolidation, calling on Vorderman to stop giving First Plus credibility. Her agent responded that Vorderman had no intention of curtailing the contract for a service which was perfectly legal and offered by an excellent company. When interviewed by The Daily Telegraph in November 2008 Vorderman herself responded with:

The secured loans market was criticised and it was pertinent to pick me out, because I was a face. I advertised FirstPlus for 10 years. We had something like £1.5billion out on loan and until a matter of months ago there were no repossessions. When that programme [BBC's Real Story] was made, [there were] no repossessions. Did they say that? Funnily enough, no.

=== Other activities ===
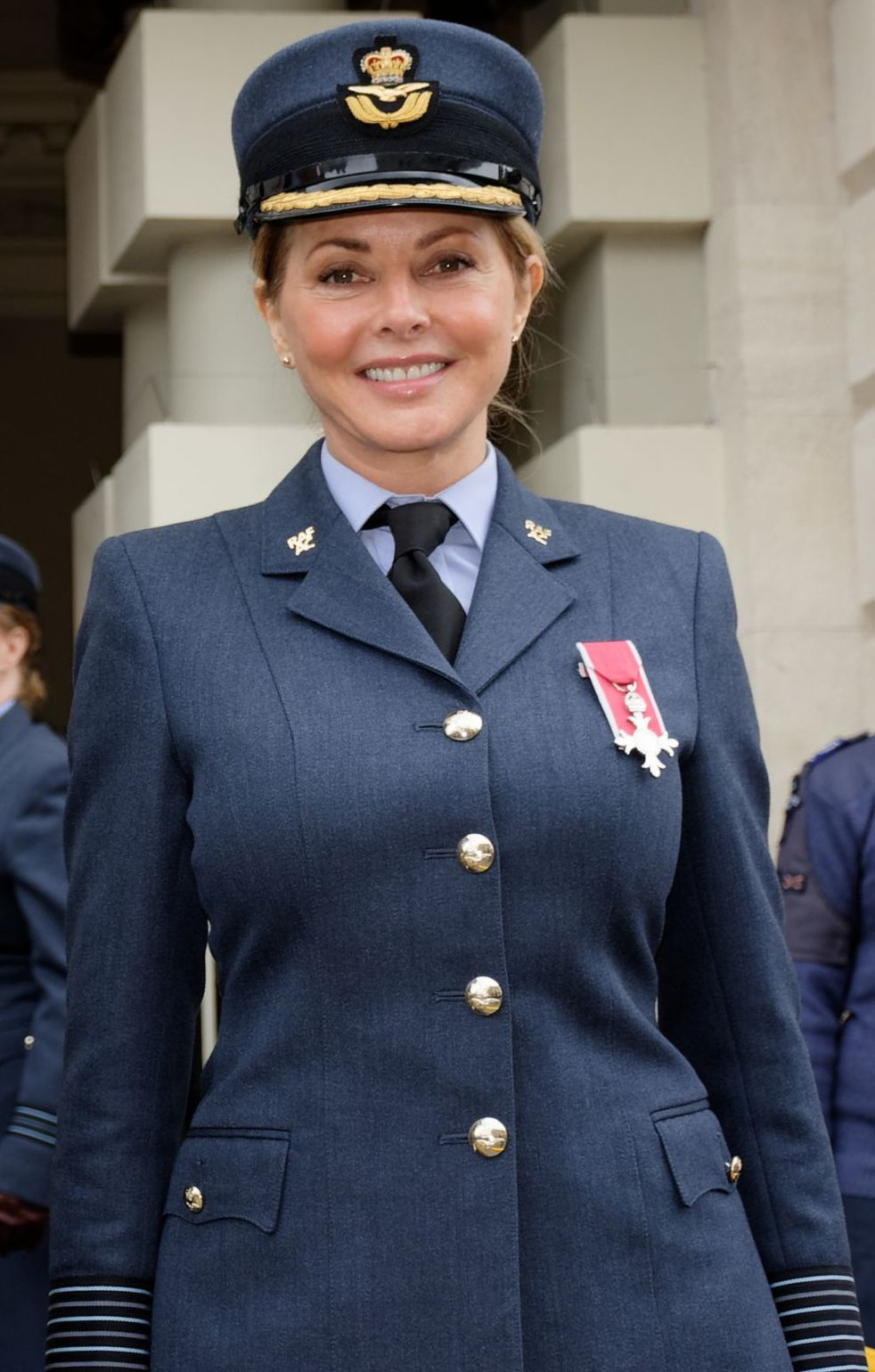
Honorary Group Captain Carol Vorderman

On 18 September 2010, Vorderman, a Catholic, co-presented events leading up to the Papal Vigil in Hyde Park, alongside author Frank Cottrell Boyce. On 2 June 2012, Vorderman named a Class 91 (91110) "Battle of Britain Memorial Flight" at the National Railway Museum as part of the Railfest 2012 Event. In 2014, Vorderman qualified for a private pilot's licence and announced that she planned to fly solo around the world. She named her plane Mildred after Mildred, Mrs Victor Bruce, a British record-breaking racing motorist, speedboat racer and aviatrix in the 1920s and 1930s, who Vorderman has described as "my heroine. She's one of the most incredible women of the last century".

On 20 November 2014, Vorderman accepted the appointment of ambassador to the Royal Air Force Air Cadets, and was granted the honorary rank of group captain in the Royal Air Force Volunteer Reserve (Training Branch). In 2017, her honorary commission was extended to 19 November 2020. Vorderman has also taken up learning the Welsh language and has been using the Say Something in Welsh online course. In early 2020, she said "I've been learning Welsh ... and I love it. It's taken me back to my roots".

== Personal life ==
Vorderman is a Catholic. She was first married in 1985 at age 24 to Christopher Mather, a Royal Navy officer, but the marriage lasted only twelve months. Her second marriage was to management consultant Patrick King in 1990 at the age of 30. Vorderman had two children with King, Katie (b. 1992) and Cameron (born 1997); the couple separated in 2000.

After meeting at a Christmas party in 1999, Vorderman and Des Kelly lived together in London from 2001, also using their other house in Glandore in County Cork, Ireland. After five years together, Vorderman and Kelly separated in December 2006, publicly announcing the amicable split in January 2007, and after a brief reconciliation in Bristol, according to reports.

Vorderman shares her Bristol home with her two children. Vorderman has lived with or very near to her mother all her life, until her mother's death in 2017. On 6 June 2020, she complained in a number of UK newspapers of being harassed by photographers in the road outside her home. Vorderman in 2022 declared a lack of interest in traditional monogamy, preferring to have "special friends" with benefits.

=== Political views ===
In 2009, Vorderman mocked the Labour Party's education policies, as part of her work heading a task force established by the Conservative Party to look at the teaching of mathematics. David Cameron commented, "Carol has got a passion for maths. We have all seen that on Countdown with her brilliant mental arithmetic and she is going to lead this task force so we can get the answers right." In an appearance on Question Time in March 2010, Vorderman was critical of all three major parties for hypocrisy in taking donations from non-domiciled taxpayers.

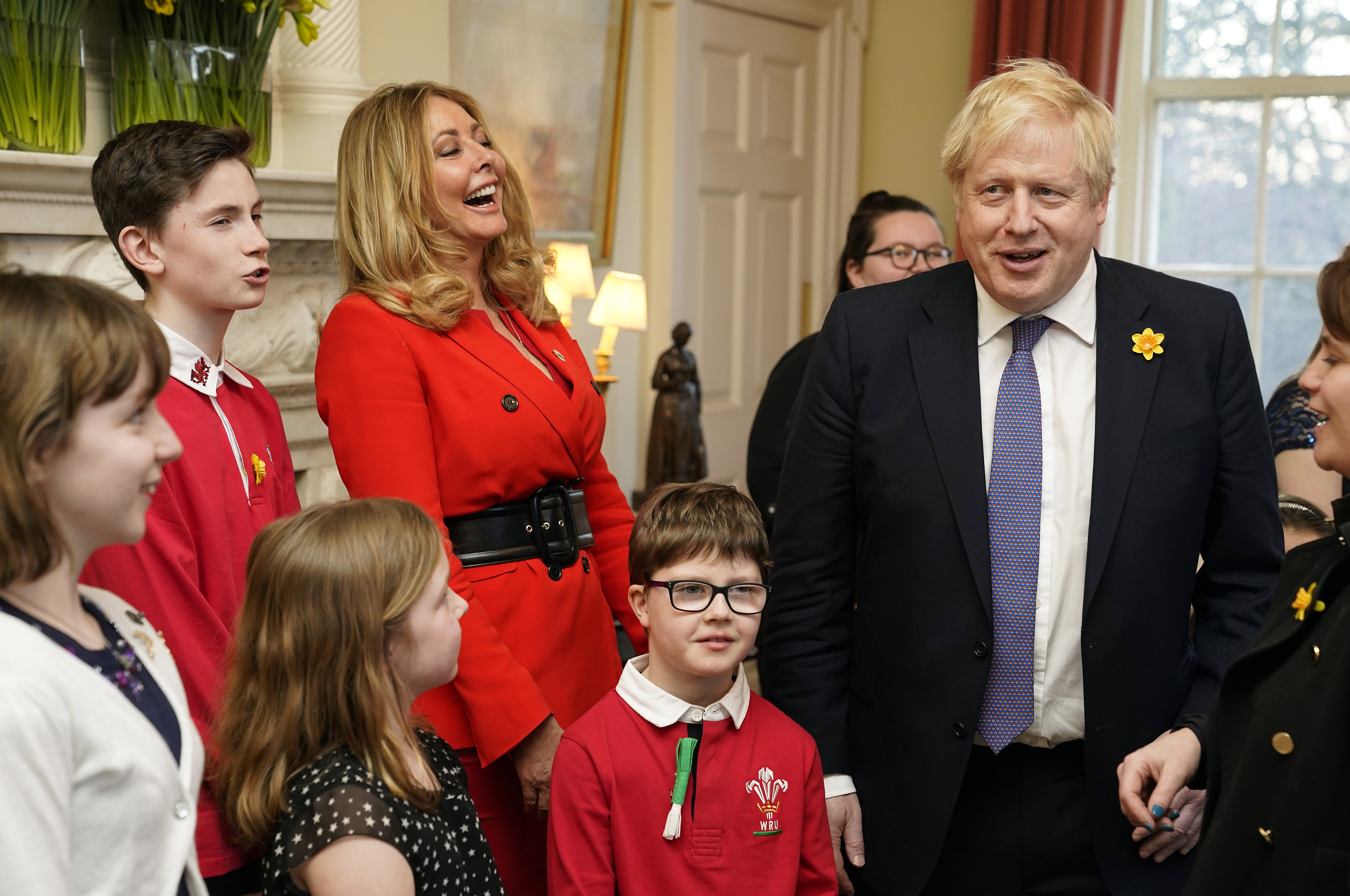
Vorderman (middle left) with Boris Johnson in February 2020

In 2023, Vorderman was critical of the Conservative administration, labelling it a "despicable government", and described herself as being politically independent. In 2022, Vorderman was praised by The Herald as the "real leader of the opposition" after criticising members of the government for exploiting their positions for personal gain.

In November 2023, the BBC objected to Vorderman's social media postings reflecting her personal opinions; she said that she would "not be silenced" by the BBC's new social media guidelines, and resigned from her weekly BBC Radio Wales show. She immediately made several posts criticising several people and policies of the Conservative government in power at the time. She referred to the then government as "a lying bunch of greedy, corrupt, destructive, hateful, divisive, gaslighting crooks". In late 2023, she became the face of tactical voting initiative StopTheTories.vote.

In August 2024 she delivered the Alternative MacTaggart Lecture at the Edinburgh Television Festival, saying "Our industry is [full] of snobbery – regional snobbery, class snobbery and educational snobbery – and don't even get me started on the political issues...Working class people feel they are not represented, their situation is not represented, the lack of opportunities and lack of money and jobs is not represented...What [social media] gives everyone, in towns and cities outside the wealthy south-east, the opportunity to do, is to see and hear views they recognise, in language they recognise."

In May 2026, Vorderman demanded an apology from Robert Kenyon, the Reform UK candidate in the Makerfield by-election, for misogynistic comments he had made against her on social media. Kenyon later refused to apologise.

== Honours and awards ==
Vorderman was appointed Member of the Order of the British Empire (MBE) for services to broadcasting in the 2000 Birthday Honours. She was elected an Honorary Fellow of Bangor University in North Wales and, in 2000, received an Honorary MA from the University of Bath.

Vorderman was voted UK Female Rear of the Year in 2011. In 2014, she became the first celebrity to win the award twice.

In November 2021, Vorderman was awarded an Honorary Fellowship of the Institution of Engineering and Technology in recognition of her outstanding contribution to the engineering profession.

== Charity work ==
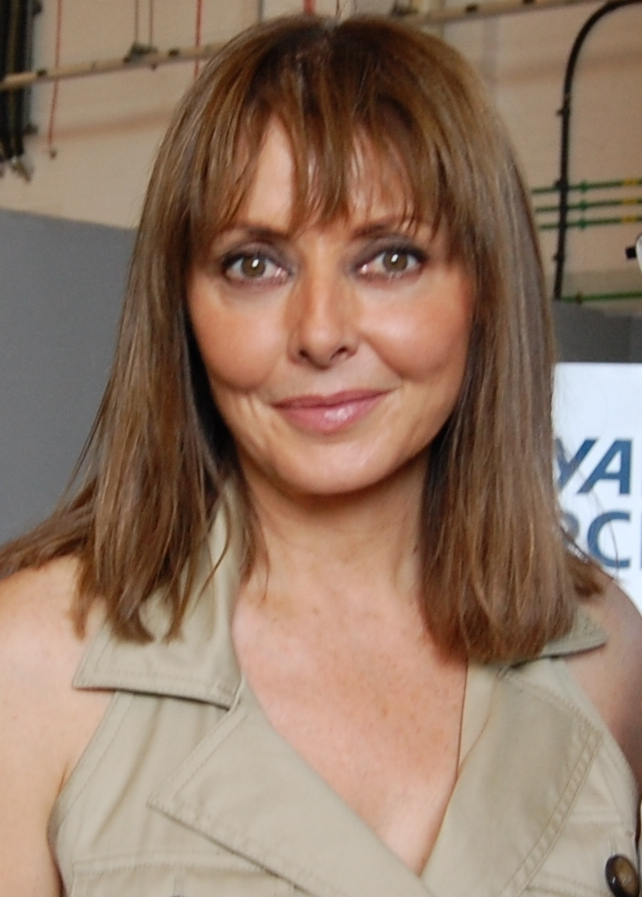
Vorderman at Waddington Airshow in 2011

Vorderman is a patron of the Cleft Lip and Palate Association (CLAPA) (her older brother, Anton, was born with a cleft lip and palate). In 2005, she was the winner of Ant and Dec's Gameshow Marathon. As part of its 50th anniversary celebrations ITV ran a series of the nation's favourite game shows featuring celebrities competing to become Gameshow Marathon winner and raise money for the charity of their choice. As series winner Vorderman won £60,000 for CLAPA. In November 2011, she appeared in the music video in aid of CLAPA for New Vorder's Carol O Carol, a song written by Jim Salveson in 1999 about his love for Vorderman, and directed by Tim Cocker.

Vorderman appeared in a short film, Run for the future, promoting prostate cancer awareness, and took part in a charity run held every year on the Bristol Downs to raise funds for the BUI prostate appeal. She also took part in the Great North Run on several occasions, to raise money for Marie Curie Cancer Care in memory of Richard Whiteley's sister Helen, who died of cancer. Vorderman is an active supporter and advocate of the RAF Association charity, appearing at airshows and taking part in other fundraising events.

== Videos and published writings ==
- Dirty, Loud and Brilliant, 1988 ISBN 0340426195
- Carol Vorderman's Pop Music Times Tables, 1990
- Carol Vorderman's How to Write a Perfect Letter, 1991
- How Mathematics Works, 1996
- Carol Vorderman's Guide to the Internet (written with Rob Young), 1998
- 30-Day Cellulite Plan, 2004 ISBN 978-0753509173
- Carol Vorderman's How to Do Sudoku, 2005
- Carol Vorderman's Massive Book of Sudoku, 2005
- Eat Yourself Clever, 2008
- Carol Vorderman's Guide to Maths
- Carol Vorderman's Detox Diet, 2009 ISBN 978-0753516812
- It All Counts, 2010 ISBN 978-0755360079
- Now What? On a Mission to Fix Broken Britain, 2024 ISBN 9781035421244

== See also ==
- List of I'm a Celebrity...Get Me Out of Here! (British TV series) contestants
- List of Strictly Come Dancing contestants
