= Adolphe Vorderman =

Dutch physician and scientist (1844–1902)

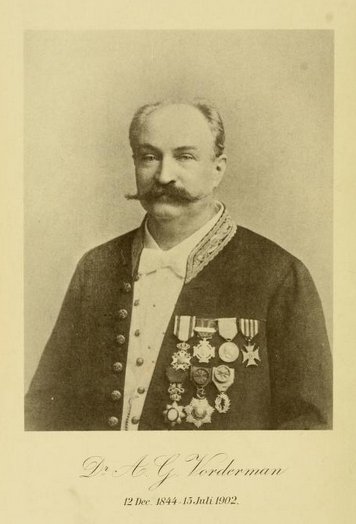
- Born: Adolphe Guillaume Vorderman; 12 December 1844; The Hague, Netherlands
- Died: 15 June 1902 (aged 57); Batavia, Dutch East Indies (now Jakarta, Indonesia)
- Occupation: Physician
- Known for: Research into beriberi
- Relatives: Carol Vorderman (great-granddaughter)

Adolphe Guillaume Vorderman (12 December 1844 – 15 July 1902) was a Dutch physician and scientist whose study of the link between polished rice and beriberi in the Dutch East Indies in 1897 helped lead to the discovery of vitamins. In addition, he was an ornithologist and botanist.

== Biography ==
Vorderman, who was born in The Hague, first travelled to the Dutch East Indies in 1866 as a naval medical officer. In 1871, he joined the Civil Health Department and was stationed at Sumenep on the island of Madura until 1881 when he was transferred to Batavia (now Jakarta). From 1890 until his death in Batavia, he served as chief inspector of the department.

=== Beriberi study ===
In 1883, the Dutch government sent Christiaan Eijkman to the Dutch East Indies (now Indonesia) to try to determine the cause of and find a cure for beriberi. He noticed that chickens fed polished rice—which is rice which has had its bran removed—developed a similar paralysis in their legs. Before he could follow up on this line of enquiry, ill health forced him to return home to the Netherlands. Before leaving he asked his friend Adolphe Vorderman, who was chief medical officer, to continue the research on the link between rice and the disease.

Vorderman, who had already noted that beriberi occurred a lot in some prisons, but very little in others, decided to conduct a preliminary survey of the type of rice served in a sample of prisons. When that initial study seemed to confirm a link, he decided to conduct a complete study of all prisons.

In 1897, Vorderman visited all of the around 100 prisons on the island of Java. He took samples of the prison rice and examined the prison records to determine the number of beriberi cases. He kept the real purpose of his visits secret so that word did not get around the Chinese rice suppliers and lead them to change the type of rice they provided.

Later, he conducted blind testing with rice experts to discover the make-up and origin of the rice varieties he found in the prison samples.

Vorderman found that, in the prisons using mostly brown rice, the incidence of beriberi was less than 1 in 10,000. In the prisons serving mainly polished white rice, the proportion was 1 in 39. In his published report, he concluded that this marked difference could not be explained by any other nutritional or sanitary factor.

Later, others, including Gerrit Grijns, took over the research which ultimately led to the discovery of vitamins. In the case of beriberi, the vitamin that was lost when the bran was removed was thiamin—vitamin B_{1}.

In a 2007 episode of the BBC genealogical documentary series Who Do You Think You Are?, Carol Vorderman researched Adolphe, her great-grandfather. In the episode, the director of the Eijkman Institute stated his opinion that, had he still been alive at the time, Adolphe Vorderman should have shared the Nobel Prize in Medicine with Eijkman and Sir Frederick Hopkins, who were awarded the prize in 1929 for their vitamin-related work.

=== Other work ===
Apart from his nutritional study, Vorderman published papers on local poisons, drugs, foods and birds, and was a collector of botanical specimens. For his work, he was made an honorary Doctor of Science by Utrecht University. The tree species Myristica vordermanni, kinds of nutmeg, were named in his honour by Otto Warburg. Vorderman became a corresponding member of the Royal Netherlands Academy of Arts and Sciences in 1889.

== Selected publications ==
- 1884 'List of the birds from Java'. In: Natuurkundig Tijdschrift voor Nederlandsch Indie (1884)
- 1885 Catalogus van eenige chineesche en inlandsche voedingsmiddelen van Batavia
- 1886 Kritische beschouwingen over Dr. C.L. van der Burg's "Materia medica", tevens eene bijdrage tot de kennis van eenige inlandsche geneesmiddelen
- 1886 Malaria te Tandjong-Priok
- 1888 Het journaal van Albert Colfs: eene bijdrage tot de kennis der kleine Soenda-eilanden (samen met Albert Colfs)
- 1889 Les oiseaux de Sumatra et leur présence dans les îles Avoisinantes)
- 1890 Eurycoma longifolia Jack de moederplant van "kajoe bidara laut"
- 1890 De vogels van Billiton
- 1891 'Bijdrage tot de kennis van het Billiton-Maleisch'. In: Tijdschrift voor Indische taal-, land- en volkenkunde (1891)
- 1891 Naar de Lampongs: verslag van een togt naar dat gewest in September 1883
- 1891 Over eene vogelcollectie afkomstig van Borneo
- 1897 Onderzoek naar het verband tusschen den aard der rijstvoeding in de gevangenissen op Java en Madoera en het voorkomen van beri-beri onder de geïnterneerden
- 1898 Molukken-vogels
- 1899 Inlandsche namen van eenige madoereesche planten en simplicia
