= Rip Rig + Panic =

English post-punk band (1980–1983)

- Origin: Bristol, England
- Genre: Post-punk
- Years active: 1980–1983
- Label: Virgin
- Past members: Neneh Cherry; Andi Oliver; Sean Oliver; Gareth Sager; Bruce Smith; Mark Springer

Rip Rig + Panic were a London-based post-punk band founded in 1980 that disbanded in 1983. The band were named after a jazz album of the same name by Roland Kirk. They were formed by Sean Oliver (bass), Mark Springer (piano, sax, vocals), Gareth Sager (guitar, sax, keyboards, vocals) and Bruce Smith (drums, percussion)—the latter two formerly of The Pop Group)—with singer Neneh Cherry. Other members included saxophonist Flash (David Wright), singer Andi Oliver, trumpeter David De Fries, and viola-player Sarah Sarhandi. Many of the members reformed as Float Up CP before that broke up in turn.

The group used the post-punk Pop Group band’s sound as a stepping off point, mixing avant-garde elements with jazz and led by Cherry's innovative pop/soul singing style. Their second album, I Am Cold, included a number of tracks featuring jazz trumpeter Don Cherry (Neneh Cherry's stepfather). They also appeared with Nico on a BBC Radio session.

== History ==
Rip Rig + Panic were formed in 1980 by drummer Bruce Smith, guitarist and saxophonist Gareth Sager and pianist Mark Springer following the dissolution of Smith and Sager's previous band, The Pop Group, with which Springer had performed live. The group chose to explore free jazz and reggae and to eschew The Pop Group's political lyrics. After vocalist Neneh Cherry and bassist Sean Oliver joined, the group released the single "Go! Go! Go! This Is It"/"The Ultimate in Fun (Is Going to the Disco with My Baby)" on 13 August 1981, prompting Gavin Martin of NME to write "Rip Rig and Panic tread a fine line between undisciplined wasted and ingenious commercial aplomb."

The band's debut album, God, was released on 3 September 1981 by Virgin Records. It fused free jazz and free improvisation with post-punk, funk and reggae music. The group received high marks from NME for virtuoso playing and esoteric sense of humour, a reviewer calling it "an act of faith in tumult." The single "Bob Hope Takes Risks" followed on 27 November. For their second album, I Am Cold, the band adopted a more commercial approach while further embracing jazz and world music influences. The album was recorded with the help of Sean Oliver's sister, vocalist Andi Oliver and jazz trumpeter Don Cherry. The band made a guest appearance in an episode (entitled "Interesting") of the British sitcom The Young Ones performing their 1982 single "You're My Kind of Climate". 1983's Attitude was the band's final album, supported by the singles "Beat the Beast" and "Do the Tightrope".

== Aftermath ==
Most members of Rip Rig and Panic (without Springer) became Float Up CP in 1984 and released a single, "Joy's Address", and the album Kill Me in the Morning, but amicably dissolved shortly thereafter; Neneh Cherry and Bruce Smith then formed the even shorter-lived God Mother & Country in 1985. Cherry commented on the group's end in an interview with Spin: "Everyone needed to go and do their own thing. I don’t remember us splitting up, but there was an overspill into another overspill."

The band's members continued their involvement in music. Mark Springer began to record as a solo artist, debuting with Piano in 1984, followed by many other solo and collaborative projects (including an album, Swans and Turtles, with Sarah Sarhandi) and developing his own record label, Exit. Sean Oliver became a session musician for Terence Trent D'Arby, co-writing his 1987 hit "Wishing Well". He died in 1990 of sickle cell anaemia aged 27. In 2010, Sager and Smith reformed The Pop Group and began touring and recording again. Andi Oliver is currently a chef, television and radio personality in the UK.

== Discography ==
- 1981: God
- 1982: I Am Cold
- 1983: Attitude
- 1985: Kill Me in the Morning (as Float Up CP)
