= Rockerilla =

Italian music and cinema magazine

- Categories: Music magazine
- Frequency: Monthly
- Publisher: Edizioni Rockerilla Snc
- Founded: 1978; 47 years ago
- Country: Italy
- Based in: Cairo Montenotte
- Language: Italian
- Website: www.rockerilla.com

Rockerilla is a monthly Italy-based music and cinema magazine founded in 1978. It has collaborated with, among others, Richard Bertoncelli and Guido Chiesa. According to Federico Guglielmi, Rockerilla was followed by those most passionate about new trends in rock music in the early 1980s.

The headquarters of Rockerilla is in Cairo Montenotte. The magazine covers genres ranging from new wave, hard rock, heavy metal, punk rock, and grunge.

== See also ==
- List of magazines in Italy
