= Dave DeFries =

English jazz musician and composer

David DeFries
- Born: 24 May 1952 (age 73); London, England
- Genres: Jazz
- Occupation: Musician
- Instruments: Trumpet, flugelhorn

David DeFries (born 24 May 1952) is an English jazz trumpeter, flugelhornist, percussionist, composer and arranger, who was born in London, England. He was a member of Chris McGregor's Brotherhood of Breath from 1981 onwards, and continues in both the London, and South African Brotherhoods that perform McGregor's repertoire.

He was also a member of Sunwind, the Penguin Cafe Orchestra, Loose Tubes, and the Breakfast Band, which occasionally recorded sessions for BBC Radio 2's "Night Owls", hosted by Dave Gelly. His one solo album, 1988's The Secret City, is on the same axis as Don Cherry and the Art Ensemble of Chicago, jazz meeting world music, with Harry Beckett on second trumpet on one of the tracks. His earlier work includes providing a trumpet backing to Chris Farlowe on Farlowe's album, Born Again (1986).
