= Gareth Sager =

British musician, composer and songwriter

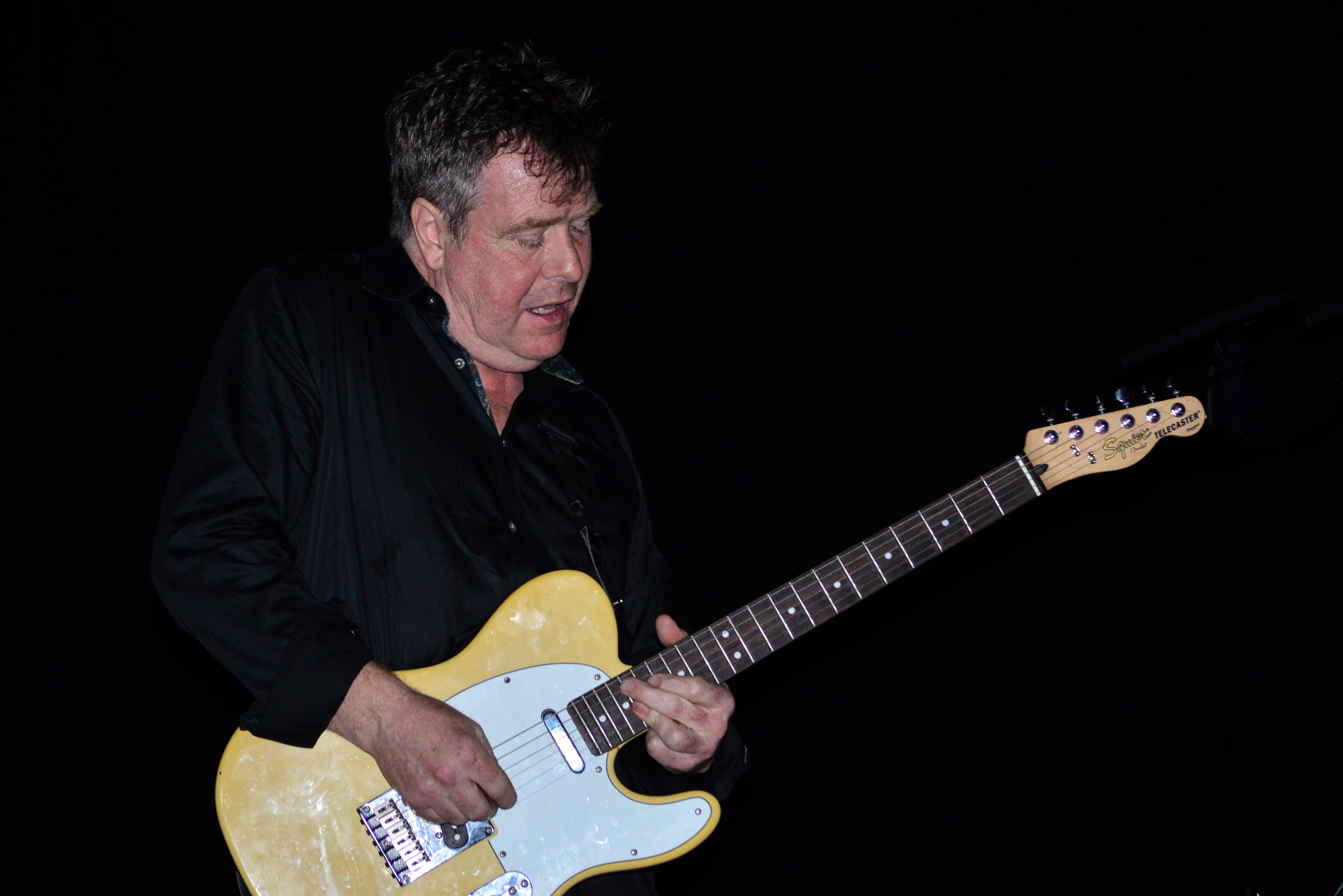
- Sager in 2015

Background information
- Born: 10 August 1960 (age 65); Edinburgh, Scotland
- Origin: Bristol, England
- Occupations: Musician, songwriter
- Instruments: Guitar, keyboards, saxophone

Gareth Sager (born 10 August 1960 in Edinburgh, Scotland) is a Scottish musician, composer and songwriter, and is a founding member of The Pop Group, Rip Rig + Panic (with Neneh Cherry), Float Up CP and Head.

In his early years, Sager became acquainted with the works of Erik Satie, Frédéric Chopin and Claude Debussy, an influential starting point revisited and expanded upon with 2017's solo piano album 88 Tuned Dreams.

After The Pop Group first disbanded in 1980, Sager formed the conceptual collective Rip Rig + Panic, headed by a young Neneh Cherry. They released three albums and a run of singles. During these years Sager also played saxophone on "A-Train", a track featured on The Flying Lizards' Fourth Wall. In 1985 Rip Rig + Panic (with Neneh Cherry) changed their name to Float Up CP releasing one final album and single before amicably disbanding.

Soon after, Sager helped initiate Head, transforming his work once again and pursuing a soused, anthemic pop under the influence of hip-hop, The Pogues, T.Rex and the traditional sea shanties and folk tunes of Sager's.

In a solo capacity, as CC Sager, Pregnant (2 albums, Unusual Lover and Weep Hippies Weep and as Gareth Sager respectively), his work has been championed and comprehensively collated by Glasgow institution and John Peel favourite Creeping Bent. He was also engaged in manifold collaborations with the late Scottish punk poet and 'tragedian' Jock Scot, including regular live performances at Edinburgh Festival Fringe, as well as a record, Caledonian Blues, released by Geoff Barrow's Invada Records.

In the last 15 years Sager has released four albums on Creeping Bent; The Last Second of Normal Time, Slack Slack Music, Juicy Rivers and Maelstrom in the Bare Garden. In 2023 he released a quartet record Ghost Ship Trance Lamentations.
