= List of myotines =

Species in mammal subfamily Myotinae

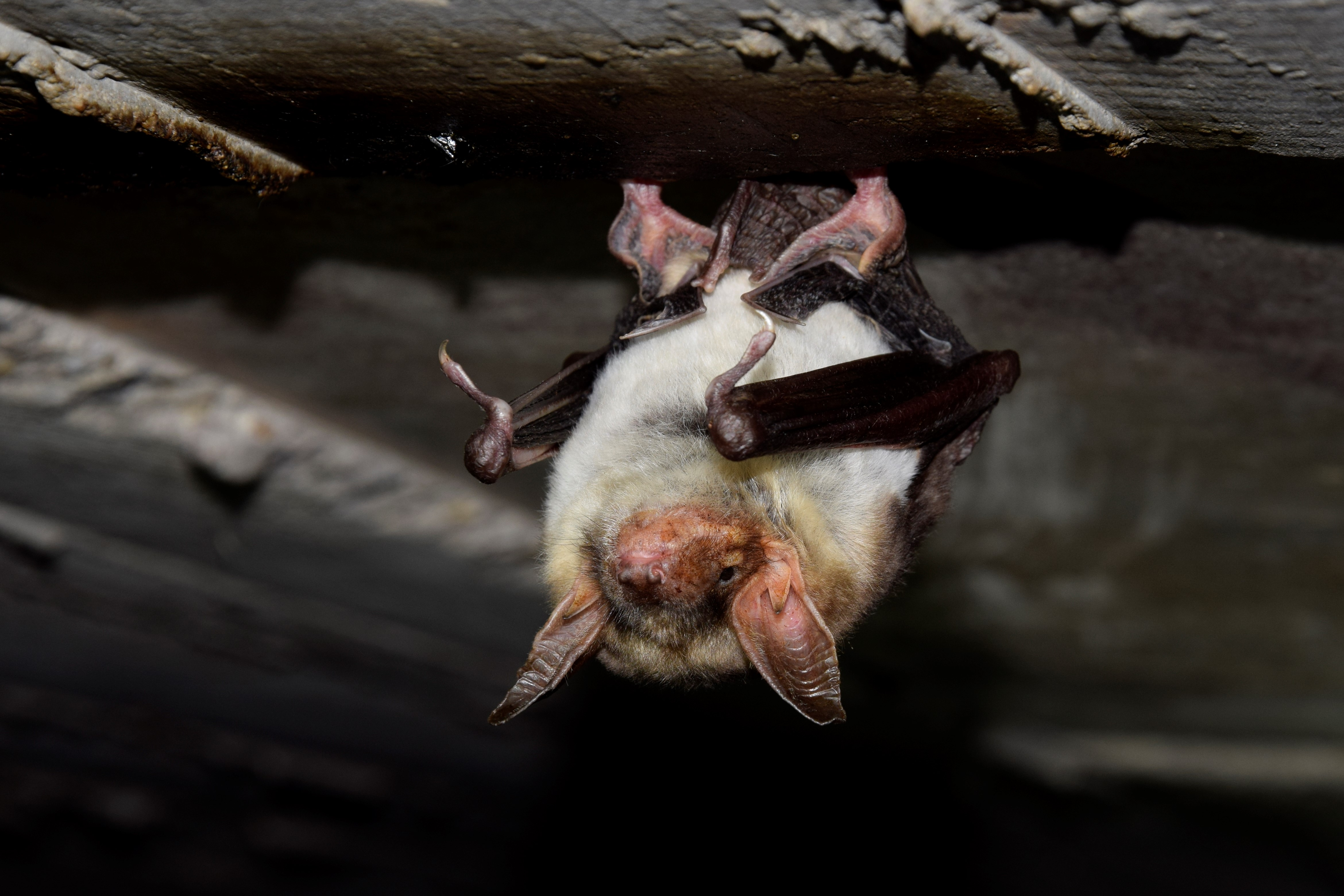
Greater mouse-eared bat (Myotis myotis)

Myotinae is one of the four subfamilies of Vespertilionidae, itself one of twenty families of bats in the mammalian order Chiroptera and part of the microbat suborder. A member of this subfamily is called a myotine, or a mouse-eared bat. They are found in all continents besides Antarctica, primarily in forests and caves, though some species can also be found in shrublands, grasslands, rocky areas, or deserts. They range in size from the Taiwan broad-muzzled bat, at 3 cm (1 in) plus a 3 cm (1 in) tail, to the large myotis, at 10 cm (4 in) plus a 6 cm (2 in) tail. Like all bats, myotines are capable of true and sustained flight, and have forearm lengths ranging from 2 cm (1 in) to 7 cm (3 in). They are all insectivorous and eat a variety of insects and spiders, but some bats with long toes which trawl for insects on top of the water, such as the long-fingered bat Daubenton's bat, Maluku myotis, Rickett's big-footed bat, and pond bat, may sometimes supplement their diet with small fish from still waters. The fish-eating bat also regularly eats fish and crustaceans as well as insects, and is the only bat species that hunts fish in the ocean. Almost no myotines have population estimates, though six species—the Atacama myotis, eastern small-footed myotis, Findley's myotis, flat-headed myotis, frosted myotis, and little brown bat—are categorized as endangered species, and three species—the Corsican myotis, Nimba myotis, and Yanbaru whiskered bat—are categorized as critically endangered.

The 147 extant species of Myotinae are divided between three genera: Eudiscopus with one species, Submyotodon with three, and Myotis, or the mouse-eared bats, with the other 143. A few extinct prehistoric myotine species have been discovered, though due to ongoing research and discoveries the exact number and categorization is not fixed.

== Conventions ==
IUCN Red List categories
Conservation status
- EX: Extinct (0 species)
- EW: Extinct in the wild (0 species)
- CR: Critically endangered (3 species)
- EN: Endangered (6 species)
- VU: Vulnerable (8 species)
- NT: Near threatened (11 species)
- LC: Least concern (63 species)

Other categories
- DD: Data deficient (25 species)
- NE: Not evaluated (31 species)

The author citation for the species or genus is given after the scientific name; parentheses around the author citation indicate that this was not the original taxonomic placement. Conservation status codes listed follow the International Union for Conservation of Nature (IUCN) Red List of Threatened Species. Range maps are provided wherever possible; if a range map is not available, a description of the myotine's range is provided. Ranges are based on the IUCN Red List for that species unless otherwise noted. Population figures are rounded to the nearest hundred.

== Classification ==
Myotinae, one of the four subfamilies of the family Vespertilionidae, contains 147 extant species divided into 3 genera.

Subfamily Myotinae

- Genus Eudiscopus (disk-footed bat): one species
- Genus Myotis (mouse-eared bats): 143 species
- Genus Submyotodon (broad-muzzled bats): three species

== Myotines ==
The following classification is based on the taxonomy described by the reference work Mammal Species of the World (2005), with augmentation by generally accepted proposals made since using molecular phylogenetic analysis, as supported by both the IUCN SSC Bat Specialist Group and the American Society of Mammalogists.

Genus Eudiscopus – Conisbee, 1953 – one species
| Common name | Scientific name and subspecies | Range | Size and ecology | IUCN status and estimated population |
|---|---|---|---|---|
| Disk-footed bat | E. denticulus (Osgood, 1932) | Southeastern Asia | Size: 4–5 cm (2 in), plus 3–5 cm (1–2 in) tail 3–4 cm (1–2 in) forearm length Habitat: Forest | LC Unknown |

Genus Myotis – Kaup, 1829 – 143 species
| Common name | Scientific name and subspecies | Range | Size and ecology | IUCN status and estimated population |
|---|---|---|---|---|
| Alcathoe bat | M. alcathoe von Helversen & Heller, 2001 | Europe and Turkey | Size: 3–5 cm (1–2 in), plus 3–4 cm (1–2 in) tail 3–4 cm (1–2 in) forearm length Habitat: Forest | DD Unknown |
| Anjouan myotis | M. anjouanensis Dorst, 1960 | Madagascar | Size: About 5 cm (2 in), plus about 5 cm (2 in) tail about 4 cm (2 in) forearm length Habitat: Unknown | DD Unknown |
| Anna Tess's bat | M. annatessae Kruskop & Borisenko, 2013 | Vietnam and Laos | Size: 3–5 cm (1–2 in), plus 3–4 cm (1–2 in) tail 3–4 cm (1–2 in) forearm length Habitat: Forest | DD Unknown |
| Arizona myotis | M. occultus Hollister, 1909 | Mexico and southwestern United States | Size: 4–6 cm (2 in), plus 2–5 cm (1–2 in) tail 3–5 cm (1–2 in) forearm length Habitat: Forest, rocky areas, caves, and desert | LC Unknown |
| Armién's myotis | M. armiensis Carrión-Bonilla & Cook, 2020 | Southern Central America and northwestern South America | Size: 7–10 cm (3–4 in), plus 3–5 cm (1–2 in) tail 3–4 cm (1–2 in) forearm length Habitat: Forest | NE Unknown |
| Atacama myotis | M. atacamensis Lataste, 1892 | Chile and Peru | Size: 4–5 cm (2 in), plus 3–4 cm (1–2 in) tail 3–4 cm (1–2 in) forearm length Habitat: Shrubland, rocky areas, and desert | EN Unknown |
| Australian myotis | M. australis Dobson, 1878 | Australia | Size: Unknown Habitat: Unknown | DD Unknown |
| Baker's myotis | M. bakeri Moratelli, Novaes, Carrión-Bonilla, & Wilson, 2019 | Peru | Size: 4–5 cm (2 in), plus 2–4 cm (1–2 in) tail 2–4 cm (1–2 in) forearm length Habitat: Shrubland, rocky areas, and desert | NE Unknown |
| Barbados myotis | M. nyctor LaVal & Schwartz, 1974 | Lesser Antilles in the Caribbean | Size: 4–5 cm (2 in), plus 3–4 cm (1–2 in) tail 3–4 cm (1–2 in) forearm length Habitat: Forest and caves | VU Unknown |
| Barquez's myotis | M. barquezi Novaes, Cláudio, Díaz, Wilson, Weksler, & Moratelli, 2022 | Argentina | Size: 4–5 cm (2 in), plus 2–4 cm (1–2 in) tail 2–4 cm (1–2 in) forearm length Habitat: Forest | NE Unknown |
| Bartel's myotis | M. bartelsii Jentink, 1910 | Indonesia | Size: Unknown length about 5 cm (2 in) forearm length Habitat: Forest, shrubland, grassland, and caves | NE Unknown |
| Bechstein's bat | M. bechsteinii (Kuhl, 1817) | Europe and western Asia | Size: 3–6 cm (1–2 in), plus 3–5 cm (1–2 in) tail 3–5 cm (1–2 in) forearm length Habitat: Forest, shrubland, and caves | NT Unknown |
| Beijing mouse-eared bat | M. pequinius Thomas, 1908 | Eastern China | Size: About 6 cm (2 in), plus about 4 cm (2 in) tail 4–6 cm (2 in) forearm length Habitat: Forest and caves | LC Unknown |
| Black myotis | M. nigricans Schinz, 1821 Two subspecies: M. n. nigricans; M. n. osculatii | Mexico, Central America, and South America | Size: 3–6 cm (1–2 in), plus 2–4 cm (1–2 in) tail 3–4 cm (1–2 in) forearm length Habitat: Forest, savanna, shrubland, and caves | LC Unknown |
| Bocharic myotis | M. bucharensis Kuzyakin, 1950 | Central Asia | Size: 4–6 cm (2 in), plus 4–6 cm (2 in) tail 3–5 cm (1–2 in) forearm length Habitat: Caves | DD Unknown |
| Bornean whiskered myotis | M. borneoensis Hill & Francis, 1984 | Island of Borneo (in green) | Size: Unknown length, plus 4–5 cm (2 in) tail 4–5 cm (2 in) forearm length Habitat: Forest | DD Unknown |
| Brandt's bat | M. brandtii (Eversmann, 1845) Two subspecies: M. b. brandtii; M. b. gracilis | Europe and western Asia (in red) | Size: 3–5 cm (1–2 in), plus 3–5 cm (1–2 in) tail 3–4 cm (1–2 in) forearm length Habitat: Forest, shrubland, grassland, inland wetlands, and caves | LC Unknown |
| Burmese whiskered myotis | M. montivagus (Dobson, 1874) | Southern Asia (in leftmost red) | Size: Unknown length 3–5 cm (1–2 in) forearm length Habitat: Forest and caves | DD Unknown |
| California myotis | M. californicus (Audubon & Bachman, 1842) Four subspecies: M. c. californicus; M. c. caurinus; M. c. mexicanus; M. c. stephensi | Western North America | Size: 3–5 cm (1–2 in), plus 3–5 cm (1–2 in) tail 3–4 cm (1–2 in) forearm length Habitat: Forest, caves, and desert | LC Unknown |
| Cape hairy bat | M. tricolor (Temminck, 1832) | Sub-Saharan Africa | Size: 5–7 cm (2–3 in), plus 3–6 cm (1–2 in) tail 4–6 cm (2 in) forearm length Habitat: Forest, savanna, and shrubland | LC Unknown |
| Carter's myotis | M. carteri LaVal, 1973 | Mexico | Size: 3–6 cm (1–2 in), plus 2–4 cm (1–2 in) tail 3–4 cm (1–2 in) forearm length Habitat: Forest, savanna, shrubland, and caves | NE Unknown |
| Cauca River myotis | M. caucensis Allen, 1914 | Western South America | Size: 4–5 cm (2 in), plus 3–5 cm (1–2 in) tail 3–4 cm (1–2 in) forearm length Habitat: Forest, savanna, shrubland, and caves | NE Unknown |
| Cave myotis | M. velifer (Allen, 1890) Five subspecies: M. v. brevis; M. v. grandis; M. v. incautus; M. v. magnamolaris; M. v. velifer | United States and Mexico | Size: 4–6 cm (2 in), plus 3–6 cm (1–2 in) tail 3–5 cm (1–2 in) forearm length Habitat: Forest and caves | LC Unknown |
| Chestnut myotis | M. badius Tiunov, Kruskop, & Feng, 2011 | China | Size: Unknown length about 3 cm (1 in) forearm length Habitat: Caves | DD Unknown |
| Chilean myotis | M. chiloensis (Waterhouse, 1840) | Southern South America | Size: 4–5 cm (2 in), plus 2–4 cm (1–2 in) tail 3–5 cm (1–2 in) forearm length Habitat: Rocky areas and forest | LC Unknown |
| Chuli myotis | M. tschuliensis Kuzyakin, 1935 | Western Asia | Size: Unknown length 3–5 cm (1–2 in) forearm length Habitat: Forest, shrubland, grassland, inland wetlands, and caves | NE Unknown |
| Chinese water myotis | M. laniger Peters, 1870 | Eastern Asia | Size: 3–5 cm (1–2 in), plus 3–4 cm (1–2 in) tail 3–4 cm (1–2 in) forearm length Habitat: Forest and caves | LC Unknown |
| Cinnamon myotis | M. fortidens Miller & Allen, 1928 Two subspecies: M. f. fortidens; M. f. sonoriensis | Guatemala and Mexico | Size: 4–6 cm (2 in), plus 3–4 cm (1–2 in) tail 3–4 cm (1–2 in) forearm length Habitat: Forest and caves | LC Unknown |
| Clyde Jones' myotis | M. clydejonesi Moratelli, Wilson, Gardner, Fisher, & Gutiérrez, 2016 | Suriname | Size: About 5 cm (2 in), plus about 4 cm (2 in) tail about 4 cm (2 in) forearm length Habitat: Forest, savanna, shrubland, and caves | NE Unknown |
| Corsican myotis | M. nustrale Puechmaille, Beuneux, & Ruedi, 2023 | France | Size: 4–5 cm (2 in), plus 3–5 cm (1–2 in) tail 3–5 cm (1–2 in) forearm length Habitat: Forest, shrubland, and rocky areas | CR 500–2000 |
| Cryptic myotis | M. crypticus Ruedi, Ibáñez, Salicini, Juste, & Puechmaille, 2019 | Southern Europe | Size: 4–5 cm (2 in), plus 3–5 cm (1–2 in) tail 3–5 cm (1–2 in) forearm length Habitat: Forest, inland wetlands, and caves | NT Unknown |
| Curacao myotis | M. nesopolus Miller, 1900 | Northern South America | Size: About 3 cm (1 in), plus about 4 cm (2 in) tail 2–4 cm (1–2 in) forearm length Habitat: Forest and shrubland | LC Unknown |
| Daubenton's bat | M. daubentonii (Kuhl, 1817) Six subspecies: M. d. chasanensis; M. d. daubentonii; M. d. loukashkini; M. d. nathalinae; M. d. ussuriensis; M. d. volgensis | Europe and Asia | Size: 4–6 cm (2 in), plus 2–5 cm (1–2 in) tail 3–5 cm (1–2 in) forearm length Habitat: Forest, shrubland, inland wetlands, rocky areas, caves, and neritic marine | LC Unknown |
| David's myotis | M. davidii Peters, 1869 | Eastern Asia | Size: 3–5 cm (1–2 in), plus 3–5 cm (1–2 in) tail 3–4 cm (1–2 in) forearm length Habitat: Caves and forest | LC Unknown |
| Diminutive bat | M. diminutus Moratelli & Wilson, 2011 | Ecuador and Colombia | Size: About 4 cm (2 in), plus about 3 cm (1 in) tail about 3 cm (1 in) forearm length Habitat: Forest | DD Unknown |
| Dominican myotis | M. dominicensis Miller, 1902 | Dominica and Guadeloupe in the Caribbean | Size: 4–5 cm (2 in), plus 2–4 cm (1–2 in) tail 3–4 cm (1–2 in) forearm length Habitat: Inland wetlands and caves | VU Unknown |
| Eastern long-fingered bat | M. macrodactylus (Temminck, 1840) Three subspecies: M. m. continentalis; M. m. insularis; M. m. macrodactylus | Eastern Asia | Size: 4–8 cm (2–3 in), plus 2–5 cm (1–2 in) tail 3–5 cm (1–2 in) forearm length Habitat: Forest, inland wetlands, and caves | LC Unknown |
| Eastern small-footed myotis | M. leibii Audubon & Bachman, 1842 | Eastern United States and Canada | Size: 4–5 cm (2 in), plus 3–5 cm (1–2 in) tail 3–4 cm (1–2 in) forearm length Habitat: Caves, rocky areas, and forest | EN Unknown |
| Eastern water bat | M. petax Hollister, 1912 | Eastern Asia | Size: 4–6 cm (2 in), plus 2–5 cm (1–2 in) tail 3–4 cm (1–2 in) forearm length Habitat: Caves, inland wetlands, and forest | LC Unknown |
| Elegant myotis | M. elegans Hall, 1962 | Mexico and Central America | Size: 3–5 cm (1–2 in), plus 3–4 cm (1–2 in) tail 3–4 cm (1–2 in) forearm length Habitat: Forest | LC Unknown |
| Escalera's bat | M. escalerai A. Cabrera, 1904 | Southwestern Europe | Size: 4–5 cm (2 in), plus 4–5 cm (2 in) tail 3–5 cm (1–2 in) forearm length Habitat: Forest, shrubland, and caves | NT Unknown |
| Far Eastern myotis | M. bombinus Thomas, 1906 Two subspecies: M. b. amurensis; M. b. bombinus | Eastern Asia | Size: 4–6 cm (2 in), plus 3–5 cm (1–2 in) tail 3–5 cm (1–2 in) forearm length Habitat: Forest and caves | NT Unknown |
| Felten's myotis | M. punicus Felten, 1977 | Northern Africa and Mediterranean islands | Size: 6–8 cm (2–3 in), plus tail 5–7 cm (2–3 in) forearm length Habitat: Caves, grassland, shrubland, and forest | DD Unknown |
| Fish-eating bat | M. vivesi Ménégaux, 1901 | Western Mexico | Size: 8–9 cm (3–4 in), plus 5–8 cm (2–3 in) tail 5–7 cm (2–3 in) forearm length Habitat: Rocky areas and caves | VU Unknown |
| Findley's myotis | M. findleyi Bogan, 1978 | Tres Marías Islands west of Mexico | Size: 4–5 cm (2 in), plus 2–4 cm (1–2 in) tail 2–4 cm (1–2 in) forearm length Habitat: Unknown | EN Unknown |
| Flat-headed myotis | M. planiceps Baker, 1955 | Central Mexico | Size: 3–6 cm (1–2 in), plus 2–3 cm (1–1 in) tail 2–3 cm (1–1 in) forearm length Habitat: Forest and caves | EN 240 |
| Fraternal myotis | M. frater (Allen, 1923) | Eastern Asia (in red) | Size: 3–5 cm (1–2 in), plus 4–6 cm (2 in) tail 3–5 cm (1–2 in) forearm length Habitat: Forest and caves | LC Unknown |
| Fringed long-footed myotis | M. fimbriatus Peters, 1870 | Eastern Asia | Size: 3–6 cm (1–2 in), plus 3–5 cm (1–2 in) tail 3–5 cm (1–2 in) forearm length Habitat: Caves | LC Unknown |
| Fringed myotis | M. thysanodes Miller, 1897 Four subspecies: M. t. aztecus; M. t. pahasapensis; M. t. thysanodes; M. t. vespertinus | Western North America | Size: 4–6 cm (2 in), plus 3–5 cm (1–2 in) tail 4–5 cm (2 in) forearm length Habitat: Forest, rocky areas, caves, and desert | LC Unknown |
| Frosted myotis | M. pruinosus Yoshiyuki, 1971 | Japan | Size: 3–5 cm (1–2 in), plus 3–4 cm (1–2 in) tail 3–4 cm (1–2 in) forearm length Habitat: Forest and caves | EN Unknown |
| Geoffroy's bat | M. emarginatus (Geoffroy, 1806) Three subspecies: M. e. desertorum; M. e. emarginatus; M. e. turcomanicus | Europe, northern Africa, and western Asia | Size: 4–6 cm (2 in), plus 3–5 cm (1–2 in) tail 3–5 cm (1–2 in) forearm length Habitat: Caves, grassland, and shrubland | LC Unknown |
| Golden myotis | M. midastactus Moratelli & Wilson, 2014 | Bolivia | Size: 5–6 cm (2 in), plus 3–5 cm (1–2 in) tail 3–5 cm (1–2 in) forearm length Habitat: Forest | NE Unknown |
| Gomantong myotis | M. gomantongensis Francis & Hill, 1998 | Island of Borneo in Malaysia | Size: Unknown length, plus 3–5 cm (1–2 in) tail 4–5 cm (2 in) forearm length Habitat: Caves | LC Unknown |
| Gray bat | M. grisescens Howell, 1909 | Eastern United States | Size: 4–6 cm (2 in), plus 3–5 cm (1–2 in) tail 4–5 cm (2 in) forearm length Habitat: Forest and caves | VU Unknown |
| Greater mouse-eared bat | M. myotis (Borkhausen, 1797) Two subspecies: M. m. macrocephalicus; M. m. myotis | Europe and western Asia | Size: 6–9 cm (2–4 in), plus 4–6 cm (2 in) tail 5–7 cm (2–3 in) forearm length Habitat: Forest, shrubland, and caves | LC Unknown |
| Guaraní myotis | M. guarani Novaes, Cláudio, Bertocchi, Oliveira, Semedo, Saldanha, Wilson, & Moratelli, 2025 | Southern South America | Size: 3–6 cm (1–2 in), plus 2–4 cm (1–2 in) tail 3–4 cm (1–2 in) forearm length Habitat: Forest, savanna, shrubland, and caves | NE Unknown |
| Guatemalan myotis | M. cobanensis Goodwin, 1955 | Guatemala | Size: About 4 cm (2 in), plus about 4 cm (2 in) tail about 4 cm (2 in) forearm length Habitat: Unknown | DD Unknown |
| Hairy-faced bat | M. annectans Dobson, 1871 | Southern and southeastern Asia | Size: 5–7 cm (2–3 in), plus 4–5 cm (2 in) tail 4–5 cm (2 in) forearm length Habitat: Forest | LC Unknown |
| Hairy-legged myotis | M. keaysi Allen, 1914 | Mexico, Central America, and northern and western South America | Size: 5–7 cm (2–3 in), plus 2–5 cm (1–2 in) tail Unknown forearm length Habitat: Forest | LC Unknown |
| Handley's myotis | M. handleyi Moratelli, Gardner, Oliveira, & Wilson, 2013 | Venezuela | Size: 4–5 cm (2 in), plus 3–4 cm (1–2 in) tail 3–4 cm (1–2 in) forearm length Habitat: Forest | NE Unknown |
| Hayes' thick-thumbed myotis | M. hayesi Csorba & Furey, 2022 | Cambodia | Size: Unknown length about 3 cm (1 in) forearm length Habitat: Unknown | NE Unknown |
| Herman's myotis | M. hermani Thomas, 1923 | Indonesia | Size: 5–6 cm (2 in), plus 3–6 cm (1–2 in) tail 4–6 cm (2 in) forearm length Habitat: Forest | DD Unknown |
| Himalayan long-tailed myotis | M. himalaicus Saikia, Chakravarty, Csorba, Laskar, & Ruedi, 2025 | Pakistan and India | Size: 3–5 cm (1–2 in), plus 4–6 cm (2 in) tail 3–5 cm (1–2 in) forearm length Habitat: Forest and caves | NE Unknown |
| Himalayan whiskered bat | M. siligorensis Horsfield, 1855 Two subspecies: M. s. siligorensis; M. s. thaianus | Central, eastern, and southeastern Asia | Size: Unknown length about 3 cm (1 in) forearm length Habitat: Forest and caves | LC Unknown |
| Hodgson's bat | M. formosus (Hodgson, 1835) | Central and eastern, and southeastern Asia | Size: 5–6 cm (2 in), plus 3–6 cm (1–2 in) tail 4–6 cm (2 in) forearm length Habitat: Forest, shrubland, grassland, and caves | NT Unknown |
| Horsfield's bat | M. horsfieldii Temminck, 1840 Five subspecies: M. h. deignani; M. h. dryas; M. h. horsfieldii; M. h. jeannei; M. h. peshwa | Southern and southeastern Asia | Size: 4–6 cm (2 in), plus 3–5 cm (1–2 in) tail 3–5 cm (1–2 in) forearm length Habitat: Forest and caves | LC Unknown |
| Hovel's myotis | M. hoveli Harrison, 1964 | Western Asia | Size: 4–5 cm (2 in), plus 3–5 cm (1–2 in) tail 3–5 cm (1–2 in) forearm length Habitat: Forest, shrubland, grassland, inland wetlands, and caves | NE Unknown |
| Huariorum myotis | M. huariorum Díaz, Medina, Arias, López & Carrión Bonilla, 2025 | Peru | Size: 4–6 cm (2 in), plus 4–5 cm (2 in) tail 3–5 cm (1–2 in) forearm length Habitat: Forest | NE Unknown |
| Hyrcanian forest myotis | M. hyrcanicus Benda, Reiter, & Vallo, 2012 | Iran | Size: Unknown length about 3 cm (1 in) forearm length Habitat: Unknown | NE Unknown |
| Ikonnikov's bat | M. ikonnikovi Ogniov, 1912 | Eastern Asia | Size: 3–6 cm (1–2 in), plus 2–5 cm (1–2 in) tail 3–4 cm (1–2 in) forearm length Habitat: Forest, inland wetlands, and caves | LC Unknown |
| Indiana bat | M. sodalis Miller, 1898 | Eastern United States | Size: 4–5 cm (2 in), plus 2–5 cm (1–2 in) tail 3–4 cm (1–2 in) forearm length Habitat: Forest and caves | NT Unknown |
| Indochinese mouse-eared bat | M. indochinensis Son, Motokawa, Estók, Thong, Dang, Oshida, Csorba, Francis, Görföl, & Endō, 2013 | Vietnam and China | Size: Unknown length 4–5 cm (2 in) forearm length Habitat: Forest | DD Unknown |
| Indochinese whiskered myotis | M. alticraniatus Osgood, 1932 | Southeastern Asia | Size: 2–5 cm (1–2 in), plus 2–4 cm (1–2 in) tail 3–4 cm (1–2 in) forearm length Habitat: Forest and caves | NE Unknown |
| Insular myotis | M. insularum Dobson, 1878 | American Samoa | Size: About 4 cm (2 in), plus about 4 cm (2 in) tail about 4 cm (2 in) forearm length Habitat: Unknown | DD Unknown |
| Izecksohn's myotis | M. izecksohni Moratelli, Peracchi, Dias, & de Oliveira, 2011 | Brazil and Argentina | Size: 4–7 cm (2–3 in), plus 3–5 cm (1–2 in) tail 3–4 cm (1–2 in) forearm length Habitat: Forest | DD Unknown |
| Kalko's whiskered myotis | M. kalkoae Tiunov, Jiang, & Liu, 2025 | China | Size: Unknown length about 3 cm (1 in) forearm length Habitat: Forest and caves | NE Unknown |
| Kashmir cave bat | M. longipes Dobson, 1873 | Southern Asia | Size: 3–5 cm (1–2 in), plus 3–5 cm (1–2 in) tail 3–4 cm (1–2 in) forearm length Habitat: Forest and caves | DD Unknown |
| Keen's myotis | M. keenii (Merriam, 1895) | Western Canada and United States | Size: 4–6 cm (2 in), plus 3–5 cm (1–2 in) tail 3–4 cm (1–2 in) forearm length Habitat: Forest and rocky areas | LC Unknown |
| Kei myotis | M. stalkeri Thomas, 1910 | Indonesia | Size: 4–8 cm (2–3 in), plus 5–6 cm (2 in) tail 5–6 cm (2 in) forearm length Habitat: Forest, inland wetlands, and caves | LC 10,000–11,000 |
| Kock's mouse-eared bat | M. dieteri Happold, 2005 | Republic of the Congo | Size: About 5 cm (2 in), plus about 4 cm (2 in) tail about 4 cm (2 in) forearm length Habitat: Forest and caves | DD Unknown |
| Lara myotis | M. larensis LaVal, 1973 | Colombia and Venezuela | Size: Unknown length 3–4 cm (1–2 in) forearm length Habitat: Forest and shrubland | NE Unknown |
| Large myotis | M. chinensis Tomes, 1857 | Eastern and southeastern Asia | Size: 9–10 cm (4 in), plus 5–6 cm (2 in) tail 6–7 cm (2–3 in) forearm length Habitat: Forest, inland wetlands, and caves | LC Unknown |
| Large-footed bat | M. adversus Horsfield, 1824 Six subspecies: M. a. adversus; M. a. carimatae; M. a. orientis; M. a. taiwanensis; M. a. tanimbarensis; M. a. wetarensis | Southeastern Asia | Size: 4–6 cm (2 in), plus 3–5 cm (1–2 in) tail 3–5 cm (1–2 in) forearm length Habitat: Forest, inland wetlands, and caves | LC Unknown |
| Large-footed myotis | M. macropus (Gould, 1854) | Eastern Australia | Size: 3–5 cm (1–2 in), plus 3–5 cm (1–2 in) tail 3–5 cm (1–2 in) forearm length Habitat: Inland wetlands and caves | LC Unknown |
| LaVal's myotis | M. lavali Moratelli, Peracchi, Dias, & de Oliveira, 2011 | Central and eastern South America | Size: 4–5 cm (2 in), plus 3–5 cm (1–2 in) tail 3–4 cm (1–2 in) forearm length Habitat: Forest, savanna, and grassland | LC Unknown |
| Lesser large-footed bat | M. hasseltii Temminck, 1840 Four subspecies: M. h. abboti; M. h. continentis; M. h. hasseltii; M. h. macellus | Southern and southeastern Asia | Size: 4–6 cm (2 in), plus 3–5 cm (1–2 in) tail 3–5 cm (1–2 in) forearm length Habitat: Forest and caves | LC Unknown |
| Lesser mouse-eared bat | M. blythii Tomes, 1857 Four subspecies: M. b. ancilla; M. b. blythii; M. b. lesviacus; M. b. omari | Europe and Asia | Size: 5–8 cm (2–3 in), plus about 6 cm (2 in) tail 5–7 cm (2–3 in) forearm length Habitat: Shrubland, grassland, and caves | LC Unknown |
| Little brown bat | M. lucifugus (Conte, 1831) Five subspecies: M. l. alascensis; M. l. carissima; M. l. lucifugus; M. l. pernox; M. l. relictus | United States and Canada | Size: 3–6 cm (1–2 in), plus 2–5 cm (1–2 in) tail 3–5 cm (1–2 in) forearm length Habitat: Forest and caves | EN Unknown |
| Long-eared myotis | M. evotis (H. Allen, 1864) Six subspecies: M. e. chrysonotus; M. e. evotis; M. e. jonesorum; M. e. micronyx; M. e. milleri; M. e. pacificus | Western North America | Size: 4–6 cm (2 in), plus 3–5 cm (1–2 in) tail 3–4 cm (1–2 in) forearm length Habitat: Caves, rocky areas, and forest | LC Unknown |
| Long-fingered bat | M. capaccinii Bonaparte, 1837 | Southern Europe, northern Africa, and western Asia | Size: 4–6 cm (2 in), plus 3–5 cm (1–2 in) tail 3–5 cm (1–2 in) forearm length Habitat: Shrubland, inland wetlands, and caves | VU Unknown |
| Long-legged myotis | M. volans H. Allen, 1866 Four subspecies: M. v. amotus; M. v. interior; M. v. longicrus; M. v. volans | Western North America | Size: 4–7 cm (2–3 in), plus 4–5 cm (2 in) tail 3–5 cm (1–2 in) forearm length Habitat: Forest, rocky areas, caves, and desert | LC Unknown |
| Long-tailed myotis | M. longicaudatus Ogniov, 1927 Four subspecies: M. l. eniseensis; M. l. kaguyae; M. l. longicaudatus | Eastern Asia (excluding red) | Size: 4–6 cm (2 in), plus 3–5 cm (1–2 in) tail 3–5 cm (1–2 in) forearm length Habitat: Forest, inland wetlands, and caves | LC Unknown |
| Long-toed myotis | M. secundus Ruedi, Csorba, Lin, & Chou, 2015 | Taiwan | Size: 3–5 cm (1–2 in), plus 3–5 cm (1–2 in) tail 3–4 cm (1–2 in) forearm length Habitat: Forest | LC Unknown |
| Malagasy mouse-eared bat | M. goudoti Smith, 1834 | Madagascar | Size: Unknown length 3–4 cm (1–2 in) forearm length Habitat: Forest, rocky areas, and caves | LC Unknown |
| Malaysian whiskered myotis | M. federatus Thomas, 1916 | Malaysia (in blue) | Size: About 5 cm (2 in), plus about 4 cm (2 in) tail 3–5 cm (1–2 in) forearm length Habitat: Forest | DD Unknown |
| Maluku myotis | M. moluccarum Thomas, 1915 Three subspecies: M. m. moluccarum; M. m. richardsi; M. m. solomonis | Indonesia | Size: 4–6 cm (2 in), plus 2–5 cm (1–2 in) tail 3–5 cm (1–2 in) forearm length Habitat: Forest and inland wetlands | LC Unknown |
| Mandelli's mouse-eared bat | M. sicarius Thomas, 1915 | India and Nepal | Size: 5–6 cm (2 in), plus 4–6 cm (2 in) tail 4–6 cm (2 in) forearm length Habitat: Forest and caves | VU Unknown |
| Mexican black myotis | M. extremus Miller & G. M. Allen, 1928 | Mexico and northern Central America | Size: 3–6 cm (1–2 in), plus 2–4 cm (1–2 in) tail 3–4 cm (1–2 in) forearm length Habitat: Forest, savanna, shrubland, and caves | NE Unknown |
| Montane myotis | M. oxyotus Peters, 1867 Two subspecies: M. o. gardneri; M. o. oxyotus | Northern and western South America | Size: 4–6 cm (2 in), plus 4–5 cm (2 in) tail 3–5 cm (1–2 in) forearm length Habitat: Forest | LC Unknown |
| Moratelli's myotis | M. moratellii Novaes, Cláudio, Carrión-Bonilla, Abreu, Wilson, Maldonado, & Weksler, 2021 | Ecuador | Size: Unknown length 3–4 cm (1–2 in) forearm length Habitat: Forest | NE Unknown |
| Morris's bat | M. morrisi Hill, 1971 | Ethiopia and Nigeria | Size: About 5 cm (2 in), plus about 5 cm (2 in) tail 4–5 cm (2 in) forearm length Habitat: Savanna and caves | DD Unknown |
| Natterer's bat | M. nattereri (Kuhl, 1817) | Europe and western Asia | Size: 4–5 cm (2 in), plus 3–5 cm (1–2 in) tail 3–5 cm (1–2 in) forearm length Habitat: Forest, shrubland, grassland, inland wetlands, and caves | LC Unknown |
| Nepal myotis | M. nipalensis Dobson, 1871 Three subspecies: M. n. nipalensis; M. n. przewalskii; M. n. transcaspicus | Central and western Asia | Size: About 4 cm (2 in), plus about 33–5 cm (1–2 in) tail about 3 cm (1 in) forearm length Habitat: Forest, shrubland, grassland, caves, and desert | LC Unknown |
| Nimba myotis | M. nimbaensis Simmons, Flanders, Fils, Parker, Suter, Bamba, Douno, Keita, Morales, & Frick, 2021 | Guinea | Size: 6–8 cm (2–3 in), plus 4–5 cm (2 in) tail 5–6 cm (2 in) forearm length Habitat: Forest, grassland, inland wetlands, caves, and shrubland | CR Unknown |
| Northern hairy-legged myotis | M. pilosatibialis LaVal, 1973 | Mexico, Central America, and northwestern South America | Size: 5–7 cm (2–3 in), plus 2–5 cm (1–2 in) tail Unknown forearm length Habitat: Forest | NE Unknown |
| Northern long-eared bat | M. septentrionalis Trouessart, 1897 | Canada and eastern United States | Size: 4–5 cm (2 in), plus 3–5 cm (1–2 in) tail 3–4 cm (1–2 in) forearm length Habitat: Forest and caves | NT Unknown |
| Orange-fingered myotis | M. rufopictus (Waterhouse, 1845) | Indonesia | Size: About 6 cm (2 in), plus 4–6 cm (2 in) tail 4–6 cm (2 in) forearm length Habitat: Forest | DD Unknown |
| Pampas myotis | M. pampa Novaes, Wilson, & Moratelli, 2021 | Uruguay | Size: Unknown length 3–4 cm (1–2 in) forearm length Habitat: Forest | NE Unknown |
| Pallid large-footed myotis | M. macrotarsus Waterhouse, 1845 Two subspecies: M. m. macrotarsus; M. m. saba | Indonesia | Size: About 6 cm (2 in), plus 4–6 cm (2 in) tail 4–5 cm (2 in) forearm length Habitat: Caves | LC Unknown |
| Peters's myotis | M. ater (Peters, 1866) Two subspecies: M. a. ater; M. a. nugax | Southeastern Asia | Size: 4–6 cm (2 in), plus 3–5 cm (1–2 in) tail 3–5 cm (1–2 in) forearm length Habitat: Forest | LC Unknown |
| Peyton's myotis | M. peytoni Wroughton & Ryley, 1913 | Southern India (in yellow) | Size: 5–7 cm (2–3 in), plus 4–5 cm (2 in) tail 4–5 cm (2 in) forearm length Habitat: Forest | DD Unknown |
| Phan Luong's myotis | M. phanluongi Borisenko, Kruskop, & Ivanova, 2008 | Vietnam | Size: About 4 cm (2 in), plus about 4 cm (2 in) tail 3–4 cm (1–2 in) forearm length Habitat: Forest and caves | NE Unknown |
| Pond bat | M. dasycneme (Boie, 1825) | Europe and northern Asia | Size: 5–7 cm (2–3 in), plus 4–6 cm (2 in) tail 4–5 cm (2 in) forearm length Habitat: Forest, inland wetlands, and caves | NT Unknown |
| Red myotis | M. ruber Geoffroy, 1806 | Southeastern South America | Size: 4–5 cm (2 in), plus 3–5 cm (1–2 in) tail 3–5 cm (1–2 in) forearm length Habitat: Forest | NT Unknown |
| Reddish myotis | M. soror Ruedi, Csorba, Lin, & Chou, 2015 | Taiwan | Size: About 5 cm (2 in), plus about 4 cm (2 in) tail about 4 cm (2 in) forearm length Habitat: Forest | DD Unknown |
| Reddish-black myotis | M. rufoniger (Tomes, 1858) | Eastern Asia | Size: 5–8 cm (2–3 in), plus 4–6 cm (2 in) tail 4–6 cm (2 in) forearm length Habitat: Forest and caves | LC Unknown |
| Rickett's big-footed bat | M. pilosus Peters, 1869 | Eastern Asia | Size: 5–7 cm (2–3 in), plus 3–6 cm (1–2 in) tail 5–7 cm (2–3 in) forearm length Habitat: Forest and inland wetlands | VU Unknown |
| Ridley's bat | M. ridleyi Thomas, 1898 | Southeastern Asia | Size: 3–5 cm (1–2 in), plus 2–4 cm (1–2 in) tail 2–4 cm (1–2 in) forearm length Habitat: Caves, inland wetlands, and forest | NT Unknown |
| Riparian myotis | M. riparius Handley, 1960 | Central America and South America | Size: 4–5 cm (2 in), plus 2–5 cm (1–2 in) tail 3–4 cm (1–2 in) forearm length Habitat: Forest | LC Unknown |
| Rufous mouse-eared bat | M. bocagii Peters, 1870 Three subspecies: M. b. bocagii; M. b. cupreolus; M. b. dogalensis | Scattered sub-Saharan Africa and Yemen | Size: 5–6 cm (2 in), plus 3–5 cm (1–2 in) tail 3–5 cm (1–2 in) forearm length Habitat: Forest and savanna | LC Unknown |
| Schaub's myotis | M. schaubi Kormos, 1934 Two subspecies: M. s. araxenus; M. s. schaubi | Armenia and Iran | Size: 4–6 cm (2 in), plus 4–5 cm (2 in) tail 3–5 cm (1–2 in) forearm length Habitat: Forest, shrubland, and caves | DD Unknown |
| Schwartz's myotis | M. martiniquensis LaVal, 1973 | Barbados and Martinique in the Caribbean | Size: Unknown length 3–4 cm (1–2 in) forearm length Habitat: Caves | NT Unknown |
| Scott's mouse-eared bat | M. scotti Thomas, 1927 | Ethiopia | Size: 4–6 cm (2 in), plus 4–5 cm (2 in) tail 3–5 cm (1–2 in) forearm length Habitat: Forest and shrubland | VU Unknown |
| Siberian bat | M. sibiricus (Kastschenko, 1905) | Northeastern Asia (in green) | Size: 3–6 cm (1–2 in), plus 3–5 cm (1–2 in) tail 3–4 cm (1–2 in) forearm length Habitat: Forest, savanna, rocky areas, and caves | LC Unknown |
| Silver-tipped myotis | M. albescens Geoffroy, 1806 | Central America and South America | Size: 4–5 cm (2 in), plus 3–5 cm (1–2 in) tail 3–4 cm (1–2 in) forearm length Habitat: Forest | LC Unknown |
| Sir David Attenborough's myotis | M. attenboroughi Moratelli, Wilson, Novaes, Helgen, & Gutiérrez, 2017 | Northeastern South America | Size: 3–5 cm (1–2 in), plus 3–4 cm (1–2 in) tail 3–4 cm (1–2 in) forearm length Habitat: Forest, savanna, shrubland, and caves | NE Unknown |
| Southeastern myotis | M. austroriparius (Rhoads, 1897) | Southeastern United States | Size: 4–6 cm (2 in), plus 2–5 cm (1–2 in) tail 3–4 cm (1–2 in) forearm length Habitat: Forest and caves | LC Unknown |
| Southwestern myotis | M. auriculus Baker & Stains, 1955 Two subspecies: M. a. apache; M. a. auriculus | Southern United States and Mexico | Size: 5–6 cm (2 in), plus 3–5 cm (1–2 in) tail 3–4 cm (1–2 in) forearm length Habitat: Forest, caves, and desert | LC Unknown |
| Sowerby's whiskered myotis | M. sowerbyi Howell, 1926 | China | Size: About 4 cm (2 in), about 4 cm (2 in) tail about 3 cm (1 in) forearm length Habitat: Forest and caves | NE Unknown |
| Szechwan myotis | M. altarium Thomas, 1911 | China and Thailand | Size: 4–6 cm (2 in), plus 3–5 cm (1–2 in) tail 4–5 cm (2 in) forearm length Habitat: Caves | LC Unknown |
| Thick-thumbed myotis | M. rosseti Oei, 1951 | Southeastern Asia | Size: 3–5 cm (1–2 in), plus 3–5 cm (1–2 in) tail 2–4 cm (1–2 in) forearm length Habitat: Forest | LC Unknown |
| Valley-dwelling myotis | M. ancricola Kruskop, Borisenko, Dudorova, & Artyushin, 2018 | Vietnam | Size: About 4 cm (2 in), plus about 4 cm (2 in) tail 3–4 cm (1–2 in) forearm length Habitat: Forest | NE Unknown |
| Valparaíso myotis | M. arescens Osgood, 1943 | Chile | Size: 4–5 cm (2 in), plus 2–4 cm (1–2 in) tail 3–5 cm (1–2 in) forearm length Habitat: Rocky areas and forest | NE Unknown |
| Velvety myotis | M. simus Thomas, 1901 | Western, central, and eastern South America | Size: 5–6 cm (2 in), plus 3–4 cm (1–2 in) tail 3–4 cm (1–2 in) forearm length Habitat: Forest | DD Unknown |
| Wall-roosting mouse-eared bat | M. muricola (Gray, 1846) Seven subspecies: M. m. browni; M. m. caliginosus; M. m. herrei; M. m. moupinensis; M. m. muricola; M. m. niasensis; M. m. patriciae | Southeastern Asia | Size: 4–6 cm (2 in), plus 3–5 cm (1–2 in) tail 3–4 cm (1–2 in) forearm length Habitat: Forest and caves | LC Unknown |
| Weber's myotis | M. weberi (Jentink, 1890) | Sulawesi island in Indonesia | Size: About 6 cm (2 in), plus about 4 cm (2 in) tail 4–6 cm (2 in) forearm length Habitat: Forest | DD Unknown |
| Welwitsch's bat | M. welwitschii (Gray, 1866) | Western, eastern, and southern Africa | Size: 5–7 cm (2–3 in), plus 5–7 cm (2–3 in) tail 5–6 cm (2 in) forearm length Habitat: Forest, savanna, shrubland, and grassland | LC Unknown |
| Western small-footed bat | M. ciliolabrum (Merriam, 1842) | Western North America | Size: 3–5 cm (1–2 in), plus 2–5 cm (1–2 in) tail 3–4 cm (1–2 in) forearm length Habitat: Forest, rocky areas, caves, and desert | LC Unknown |
| Whiskered bat | M. mystacinus (Kuhl, 1817) Three subspecies: M. m. caucasicus; M. m. mystacinus; M. m. occidentalis | Europe, northern Africa, and western Asia | Size: 3–5 cm (1–2 in), plus 3–5 cm (1–2 in) tail 3–4 cm (1–2 in) forearm length Habitat: Desert, caves, grassland, shrubland, and forest | LC Unknown |
| Yanbaru whiskered bat | M. yanbarensis Maeda & Matsumura, 1998 | Ryukyu Islands in Japan | Size: 3–5 cm (1–2 in), plus 3–5 cm (1–2 in) tail 3–4 cm (1–2 in) forearm length Habitat: Forest | CR Unknown |
| Yellowish myotis | M. levis Geoffroy, 1806 | Southeastern South America (in red) | Size: 3–6 cm (1–2 in), plus 4–5 cm (2 in) tail 3–5 cm (1–2 in) forearm length Habitat: Forest | LC Unknown |
| Yuma myotis | M. yumanensis H. Allen, 1864 Six subspecies: M. y. lambi; M. y. lutosus; M. y. oxalis; M. y. saturatus; M. y. sociabilis; M. y. yumanensis | Western North America | Size: 4–5 cm (2 in), plus 2–4 cm (1–2 in) tail 3–4 cm (1–2 in) forearm length Habitat: Forest and caves | LC Unknown |
| Zenati myotis | M. zenatius Ibáñez, Juste, Salicini, Puechmaille, & Ruedi, 2019 | Northwestern Africa | Size: 4–5 cm (2 in), plus 3–5 cm (1–2 in) tail 3–4 cm (1–2 in) forearm length Habitat: Forest, shrubland, and caves | NE Unknown |

Genus Submyotodon – Ziegler, 2003 – three species
| Common name | Scientific name and subspecies | Range | Size and ecology | IUCN status and estimated population |
|---|---|---|---|---|
| Himalayan broad-muzzled bat | S. caliginosus Tomes, 1859 | Southern Asia | Size: About 4 cm (2 in), plus about 3 cm (1 in) tail about 3 cm (1 in) forearm length Habitat: Desert, caves, grassland, shrubland, and forest | NE Unknown |
| Taiwan broad-muzzled bat | S. latirostris (Kishida, 1932) | Taiwan | Size: 3–4 cm (1–2 in), plus 3–4 cm (1–2 in) tail 3–4 cm (1–2 in) forearm length Habitat: Forest | LC Unknown |
| Moupin broad-muzzled bat | S. moupinensis Milne-Edwards, 1872 | China and Myanmar | Size: About 4 cm (2 in), plus about 3 cm (1 in) tail about 3 cm (1 in) forearm length Habitat: Desert, caves, grassland, shrubland, and forest | NE Unknown |

== Sources ==
- Chernasky, Amy; Motis, Anna; Burgin, Connor, eds. (2023). All the Mammals of the World. Lynx Nature Books. ISBN 978-84-16728-66-4.
- Simmons, Nancy B. (2005). Wilson, Don E.; Reeder, DeeAnn M. (eds.). Mammal Species of the World. Vol. 1 (3rd ed.). Johns Hopkins University Press. ISBN 978-0-8018-8221-0.
- Nowak, Ronald M. (1994). Walker's Bats of the World. Johns Hopkins University Press. ISBN 978-0-8018-4986-2.
