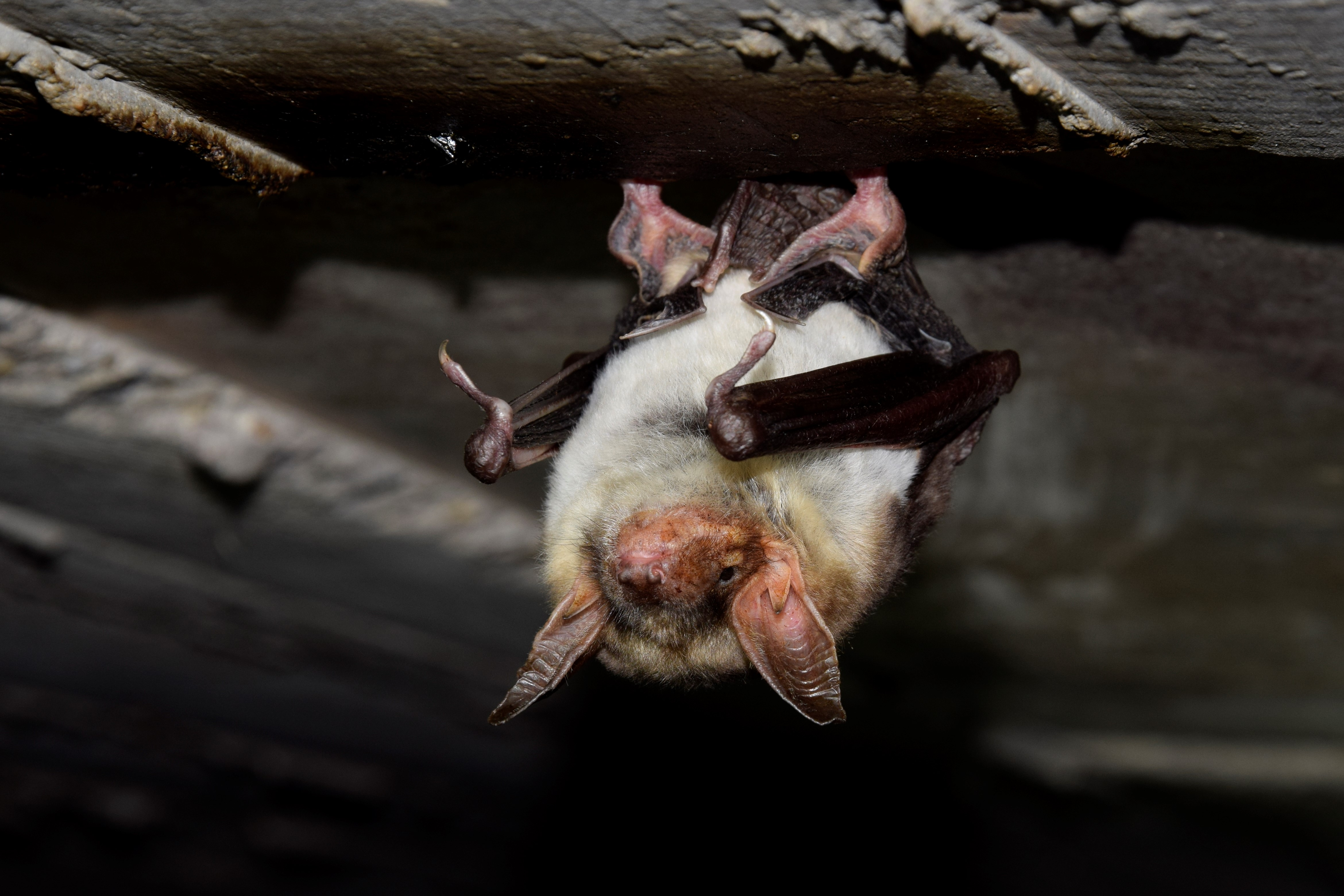
- Greater mouse-eared bat (Myotis myotis)

Scientific classification
- Kingdom: Animalia
- Phylum: Chordata
- Class: Mammalia
- Infraclass: Placentalia
- Order: Chiroptera
- Family: Vespertilionidae
- Subfamily: Myotinae; Tate, 1942

Genera
- Eudiscopus; Myotis; Submyotodon

= Myotinae =

Myotinae Temporal range: Early Oligocene to present 33–0 Ma

Subfamily of bats

Myotinae is a subfamily of vesper bats. It contains three genera: Eudiscopus, Myotis, and Submyotodon. Before the description of Submyotodon and analysis of its phylogenetics, as well as a phylogenetic analysis of Eudiscopus, the only member of Myotinae was Myotis.

== Species ==
- Eudiscopus
  - Eudiscopus denticulus (Osgood, 1932) - disk-footed bat
- Myotis
  - Myotis adversus (Horsfield, 1824) - large-footed bat, large-footed mouse-eared bat, large-footed myotis
  - Myotis aelleni (Baud, 1979) - southern myotis
  - Myotis albescens (E. Geoffroy, 1806) - silver-tipped myotis
  - Myotis alcathoe (von Helversen and Heller, 2001) - Alcathoe bat
  - Myotis altarium (Thomas, 1911) - Szechwan myotis
  - Myotis alticranius Osgood, 1932 - Indochinese whiskered myotis
  - Myotis ancricola Kruskop, Borisenko, Dudorova, & Artyushin, 2018 - valley myotis
  - Myotis anjouanensis (Dorst, 1960) - Anjouan myotis
  - Myotis annamiticus (Kruskop and Tsytsulina, 2001) - Annamit myotis
  - Myotis annatessae Kruskop & Borisenko, 2013 - Anna Tess's myotis
  - Myotis annectans (Dobson, 1871) - hairy-faced bat
  - Myotis armiensis Carrión-Bonilla & Cook, 2020 - Armién's myotis
  - Myotis atacamensis (Lataste, 1892) - Atacama myotis
  - Myotis ater (Peters, 1866) - Peters's myotis, small black myotis
  - Myotis attenboroughi Moratelli et al., 2017 (Note: Split from M. nigricans (Moratelli et al., 2017).) - Sir David Attenborough's myotis
  - Myotis aurascens (Kuzyakin, 1935) (Note: Split from M. mystacinus (Mayer et al., 2007).)
  - Myotis auriculus (Baker and Stains, 1955) - southwestern myotis
  - Myotis australis (Dobson, 1878) - Australian myotis
  - Myotis austroriparius (Rhoads, 1897) - southeastern myotis
  - Myotis badius Tiunov, Kruskop, & Feng Jiang, 2011 - chestnut myotis
  - Myotis bakeri Moratelli, Novaes, Bonilla, & D. E. Wilson, 2019 - Baker's myotis
  - Myotis bartelsii (Jentink, 1910) - Bartels's myotis
  - Myotis bechsteinii (Kuhl, 1817) - Bechstein's bat
  - Myotis blythii (Tomes, 1857) - lesser mouse-eared bat
  - Myotis bocagii (Peters, 1870) - rufous mouse-eared bat
  - Myotis bombinus (Thomas, 1906) - Far Eastern myotis, bombinus bat
  - Myotis borneoensis Hill & Francis, 1984 - Bornean whiskered myotis
  - Myotis brandtii (Eversmann, 1845) - Brandt's bat
  - Myotis browni E. H. Taylor, 1934 - Brown's whiskered myotis
  - Myotis bucharensis (Kuzyakin, 1950) - Bocharic myotis, Bokhara whiskered bat
  - Myotis californicus (Audubon and Bachman, 1842) - California myotis
  - Myotis capaccinii (Bonaparte, 1837) - long-fingered bat
  - Myotis caucensis Allen, 1914 - Colombian black myotis
  - Myotis chiloensis (Waterhouse, 1840) - Chilean myotis
  - Myotis chinensis (Tomes, 1857) - large myotis
  - Myotis ciliolabrum (Merriam, 1886) - western small-footed bat, western small-footed myotis
  - Myotis clydejonesi Moratelli, D. E. Wilson, A. L. Gardner, Fisher, & Gutierrez, 2016 - Clyde Jones's myotis
  - Myotis cobanensis (Goodwin, 1955) - Guatemalan myotis
  - Myotis crypticus Ruedi, Ibáñez, Salicini, Juste & Puechmaille, 2019 - cryptic myotis
  - Myotis csorbai (Topál, 1997) - Csorba's mouse-eared bat
  - Myotis dasycneme (Boie, 1825) - pond bat
  - Myotis daubentonii (Kuhl, 1817) - Daubenton's bat
  - Myotis davidii (Peters, 1869) - David's myotis
  - Myotis dieteri (Happold, 2005) (Note: A new species (Happold, 2005).) - Kock's mouse-eared bat
  - Myotis diminutus Moratelli & Wilson, 2011 - diminutive myotis
  - Myotis dinellii Thomas, 1902 - Dinelli's myotis
  - Myotis dominicensis Miller, 1902 - Dominican myotis
  - Myotis elegans Hall, 1962 - elegant myotis
  - Myotis emarginatus (E. Geoffroy, 1806) - Geoffroy's bat
  - Myotis escalerai Cabrera, 1904 (Note: Split from M. nattereri (Ibáñez et al., 2006).) - Escalera's bat
  - Myotis evotis (H. Allen, 1864) - long-eared myotis
  - Myotis federatus Thomas, 1916 - Malaysian whiskered myotis
  - Myotis fimbriatus (Peters, 1871) - fringed long-footed myotis
  - Myotis findleyi Bogan, 1978 - Findley's myotis
  - Myotis formosus (Hodgson, 1835) - Hodgson's bat, copper-winged bat
  - Myotis fortidens Miller and Allen, 1928 - cinnamon myotis
  - Myotis frater G.M. Allen, 1923 - fraternal myotis
  - Myotis gomantongensis Francis and Hill, 1998 - Gomantong myotis
  - Myotis goudotii (A. Smith, 1834) - Malagasy mouse-eared bat
  - Myotis gracilis Ognev, 1927 (Note: Split from M. brandtii (Ohdachi et al., The Wild Mammals of Japan, 2009).)
  - Myotis grisescens A.H. Howell, 1909 - gray bat
  - Myotis hajastanicus Argyropulo, 1939 - Armenian whiskered bat, Hajastan myotis, Armenian myotis
  - Myotis handleyi Moratelli, A. L. Gardner, J. A. Oliveira, & D. E. Wilson, 2013 - Handley's myotis
  - Myotis hasseltii (Temminck, 1840) - lesser large-footed bat
  - Myotis hermani Thomas, 1923 - Herman's myotis
  - Myotis horsfieldii (Temminck, 1840) - Horsfield's bat
  - Myotis hoveli Harrison, 1964 - Hovel's myotis
  - Myotis hyrcanicus Benda et al., 2012 - Hyrcanian myotis
  - Myotis ikonnikovi Ognev, 1912 - Ikonnikov's bat
  - Myotis indochinensis Son et al., 2013 - Indochinese myotis
  - Myotis insularum (Dobson, 1878) - insular myotis
  - Myotis izecksohni Moratelli, Peracchi, Dias & de Oliveira, 2011 - Izecksohn's myotis
  - Myotis keaysi J.A. Allen, 1914 - hairy-legged myotis
  - Myotis keenii (Merriam, 1895) - Keen's myotis
  - Myotis laniger Peters, 1871 - Chinese water myotis
  - Myotis larensis LaVal, 1973 - Lara myotis
  - Myotis lavali Moratelli, Peracchi, Dias, & Oliveira, 2011 - LaVal's Myotis
  - Myotis leibii (Audubon and Bachman, 1842) - eastern small-footed bat
  - Myotis levis (I. Geoffroy, 1824) - yellowish myotis
  - Myotis longicaudatus Ognev, 1927 - long-tailed myotis
  - Myotis longipes (Dobson, 1873) - Kashmir cave bat
  - Myotis lucifugus (Le Conte, 1831) - little brown bat, eastern little brown myotis
  - Myotis macrodactylus (Temminck, 1840) - eastern long-fingered bat, big-footed myotis
  - Myotis macropus (Gould, 1854) - southern myotis, large-footed myotis
  - Myotis macrotarsus (Waterhouse, 1845) - pallid large-footed myotis, Philippine large-footed myotis
  - Myotis martiniquensis LaVal, 1973 - Schwartz's myotis
  - Myotis melanorhinus Merriam, 1890 - dark-nosed small-footed myotis
  - Myotis midastactus Moratelli & Wilson, 2014 - golden myotis (Note: Split from M. simus (Moratelli & Wilson, 2014).)
  - Myotis moluccarum (Thomas, 1915) - Maluku myotis, Arafura large-footed bat
  - Myotis montivagus (Dobson, 1874) - Burmese whiskered bat
  - Myotis morrisi Hill, 1971 - Morris's bat
  - Myotis muricola (Gray, 1846) - wall-roosting mouse-eared bat, Nepalese whiskered myotis
  - Myotis myotis (Borkhausen, 1797) - greater mouse-eared bat
  - Myotis mystacinus (Kuhl, 1817) - whiskered bat
  - Myotis nattereri (Kuhl, 1817) - Natterer's bat
  - Myotis nesopolus Miller, 1900 - Curaçao myotis
  - Myotis nigricans (Schinz, 1821) - black myotis
  - Myotis nimbaensis (Simmons et al., 2021) - Nimba mountain bat
  - Myotis nipalensis Dobson, 1871 - Nepal myotis
  - Myotis nyctor LaVal & Schwartz, 1974 - Barbados myotis (Note: Split from M. martiniquensis (Larsen et al., 2012).)
  - Myotis occultus Hollister, 1909 - Arizona myotis
  - Myotis oreias (Temminck, 1840) - Singapore whiskered bat
  - Myotis oxyotus (Peters, 1867) - montane myotis
  - Myotis peninsularis Miller, 1898 - peninsular myotis
  - Myotis pequinius Thomas, 1908 - Beijing mouse-eared bat, Peking myotis
  - Myotis petax Hollister, 1912 (Note: Split from M. daubentonii (Matveev et al., 2005). Includes M. abei (Tsytsulina, 2004, as daubentonii).) - eastern water bat, Sakhalin bat
  - Myotis peytoni Wroughton & Ryley, 1913 - Peyton's myotis
  - Myotis phanluongi Borisenko, Kruskop and Ivanova, 2008 - Phan Luong's myotis (Note: A new species (Borisenko et al., 2008).)
  - Myotis pilosatibialis LaVal, 1973 - northern hairy-legged myotis
  - Myotis pilosus Peters, 1869 - Rickett's big-footed bat
  - Myotis planiceps Baker, 1955 - flat-headed myotis
  - Myotis pruinosus Yoshiyuki, 1971 - frosted myotis
  - Myotis punicus Felten, Spitzenberger and Storch, 1977 - Felten's myotis
  - Myotis ricketti (Thomas, 1894)
  - Myotis ridleyi Thomas, 1898 - Ridley's bat
  - Myotis riparius Handley, 1960 - riparian myotis
  - Myotis rosseti (Oey, 1951) - thick-thumbed myotis
  - Myotis ruber (E. Geoffroy, 1806) - red myotis
  - Myotis rufoniger (Tomes, 1858) - reddish-black myotis
  - Myotis rufopictus (Waterhouse, 1845) - orange-fingered myotis
  - Myotis schaubi Kormos, 1934 - Schaub's myotis
  - Myotis scotti Thomas, 1927 - Scott's mouse-eared bat
  - Myotis secundus Ruedi, Csorba, Lin, & Chou, 2015 - long-toed myotis
  - Myotis septentrionalis (Trouessart, 1897) - northern long-eared bat, northern myotis
  - Myotis sibiricus (Kastschenko, 1905) - Siberian whiskered myotis
  - Myotis sicarius Thomas, 1915 - Mandelli's mouse-eared bat
  - Myotis siligorensis (Horsfield, 1855) - Himalayan whiskered bat
  - Myotis simus Thomas, 1901 - velvety myotis
  - Myotis sodalis Miller and Allen, 1928 - Indiana bat
  - Myotis soror Ruedi, Csorba, Lin, & Chou, 2015 - reddish myotis
  - Myotis sowerbyi Howell, 1926 - Sowerby's whiskered myotis
  - Myotis stalkeri Thomas, 1910 - Kei myotis
  - Myotis thysanodes Miller, 1897 - fringed myotis
  - Myotis tricolor (Temminck, 1832) - Cape hairy bat, little brown bat, Temminck's mouse-eared bat, Cape myotis, tricoloured mouse-eared bat, Cape hairy myotis, Temminck's hairy bat, three-coloured bat
  - Myotis tschuliensis Kuzyakin, 1935 - Tschuli myotis
  - Myotis velifer (J.A. Allen, 1890) - cave myotis
  - Myotis vivesi Menegaux, 1901 - fish-eating bat, fish-eating myotis
  - Myotis volans (H. Allen, 1866) - long-legged myotis
  - Myotis weberi (Jentink, 1890) - Weber's myotis
  - Myotis welwitschii (Gray, 1866) - Welwitsch's bat, Welwitsch's mouse-eared bat, Welwitsch's myotis
  - Myotis yanbarensis Maeda and Matsumara, 1998 - Yanbaru whiskered bat
  - Myotis yumanensis (H. Allen, 1864) - Yuma myotis
  - Myotis zenatius Ibáñez, Juste, Salicini, Puechmaille & Ruedi, 2019 - Zenati myotis
- Submyotodon
  - Submyotodon caliginosus (Tomes, 1859) - Himalayan broad-muzzled bat
  - Submyotodon latirostris (Kishida, 1932) - Taiwan broad-muzzled bat
  - Submyotodon moupinensis (Milne-Edwards, 1872) - Moupin broad-muzzled bat

=== Fossil taxa ===
The following fossil genera are also known:

- †Miomyotis Lawrence, 1943 - Early Miocene of Florida, US
- †Oligomyotis Galbreath, 1962 - Oligocene of Colorado, US
- †Suaptenos Lawrence, 1943 - Early Miocene of Florida, US
