= Jiang Feng =

Jiang Feng may refer to:

- Jiang Feng (artist) (1910–1983), Chinese artist
- Jiang Feng (translator) (born 1929), Chinese translator
- Jiang Feng (footballer) (born 1970), Chinese footballer
