= Findley's myotis =

Conservation status
- Endangered (IUCN 3.1)

Scientific classification
- Kingdom: Animalia
- Phylum: Chordata
- Class: Mammalia
- Order: Chiroptera
- Family: Vespertilionidae
- Genus: Myotis
- Species: M. findleyi

Binomial name
- Myotis findleyi Bogan, 1978
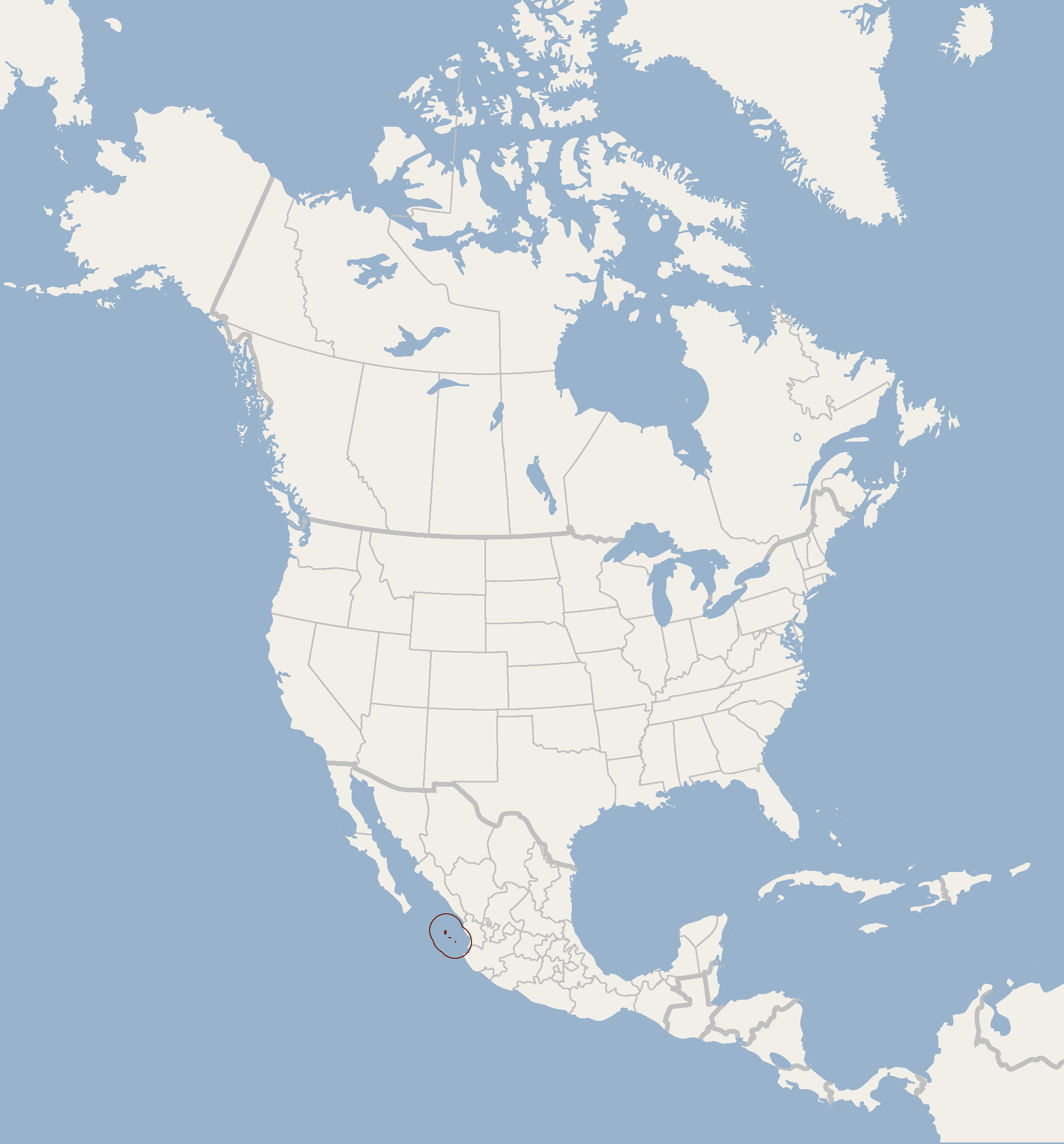

Species of bat

Findley's myotis (Myotis findleyi) is a species of vesper bat. It is found only on the Tres Marías Islands off the west coast of Mexico.

== Taxonomy and etymology ==
This species was first encountered by Alphonse Forrer in the late 19th century. The specimen he collected was described by Oldfield Thomas as a member of the black myotis (Myotis nigricans). In 1928, the specimen collected by Forrer was identified as the California myotis (Myotis californicus). In 1978, the Myotis bats of Tres Marías Islands were elevated to species level, receiving the name Myotis findleyi. It was given the species name findleyi to honor James Smith Findley, a mammalogist and the former Curator of Mammals at the University of New Mexico Museum of Southwestern Biology. Findley was honored "in recognition of his work on bats of the genus Myotis."

== Description ==
It is one of the smallest bats in its genus in the New World. In mass, it is only 2–3 g (0.071–0.106 oz) In total, it is 70–80 mm (2.8–3.1 in) long. Their forearms are 29.5–33.2 mm (1.16–1.31 in) long. Their dorsal fur is dark brown to brownish-black in color. Individual hairs have frosted tips at the distal third of the hair, while the proximal two-thirds of the hairs are dark brown or black. Individual dorsal hairs are 8 mm (0.31 in) long. Their ventral fur is also bicolored; the base of the hair is black, while the tips are buffy. The uropatagium is furred on the ventral surface. Wing membranes are dark brown in color. The keel of the calcar is indistinct. Their feet are relatively large in proportion to their body size at 6.6 mm (0.26 in), and all their toes have sparse hairs. Their ears are relatively small, measuring 11.9 mm (0.47 in) long. Ears have a pronounced notch at the base, and are dark brown in color. The tragus is 5.5 mm (0.22 in) long, and pointed at the tip. Its dental formula is 2.1.3.33.1.3.3, for a total of 38 teeth.

== Biology ==
It is insectivorous. So far, it has only been captured by placing mist nets over streams and pools. It is unknown if it roosts in caves or tree hollows during the day.

== Range and habitat ==
It is only found in the tropical deciduous forests of the Tres Marías Islands. It is found from 0–600 m (0–1,969 ft) above sea level.

== Conservation ==
This species is listed as endangered by the IUCN. It is listed as endangered because its extent of occurrence is approximately 900 km^{2} (350 mi^{2}), and it occurs in fewer than five locations. There is also a projected decline in the extent and quality of their habitat. Threats to this species include urbanization, livestock farming, deforestation, and invasive species. Some of the bat's habitat is protected, as their range includes Islas Marías Biosphere Reserve. Some of its range also occurs on property owned by Islas Marías Federal Prison.
