= Myotis annatessae =

Conservation status
- Data Deficient (IUCN 3.1)

Scientific classification
- Kingdom: Animalia
- Phylum: Chordata
- Class: Mammalia
- Order: Chiroptera
- Family: Vespertilionidae
- Genus: Myotis
- Species: M. annatessae

Binomial name
- Myotis annatessae Kruskop & Borisenko, 2013
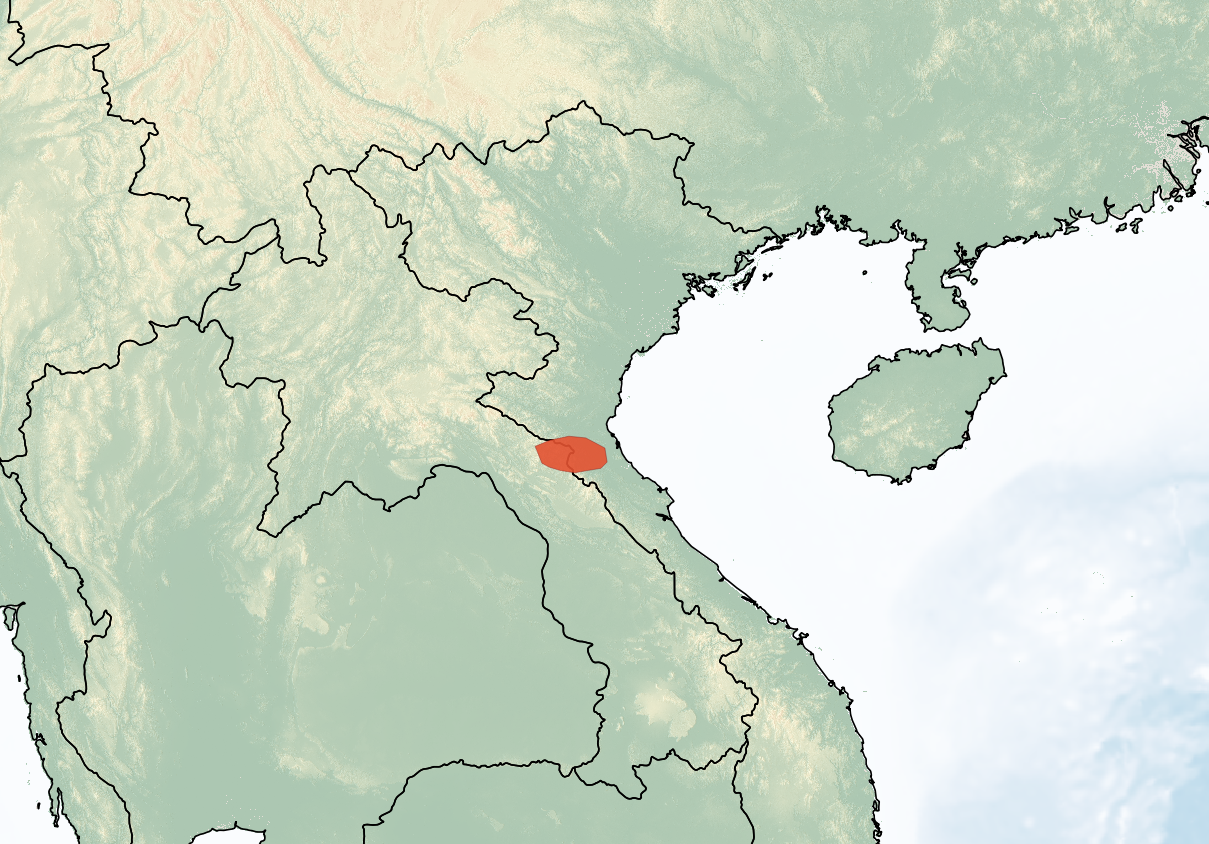

Species of bat

Myotis annatessae is a recently described species of bat in the family Vespertilionidae. It is endemic to Vietnam and Laos.

== Taxonomy ==
The species initial holotype was collected at the Song Con River in Vietnam.

== Description ==
The species resembles smaller specimens of Myotis muricola, but is differentiated by a cranial and external characteristics.

== Distribution and habitat ==
The species is endemic to Southeast Asia. It is only known to occur in only two localities in Vietnam (Ha Tinh province) and Laos (Khammouan province). It is found from 200–1,300 m (660–4,270 ft) above sea level.

== Conservation ==
The bat is considered data-deficient because of the lack of samples and information about the species.
