= Myotis lavali =

Conservation status
- Least Concern (IUCN 3.1)

Scientific classification
- Kingdom: Animalia
- Phylum: Chordata
- Class: Mammalia
- Order: Chiroptera
- Family: Vespertilionidae
- Genus: Myotis
- Species: M. lavali

Binomial name
- Myotis lavali Moratelli, Peracchi, Dias & de Oliveira, 2011
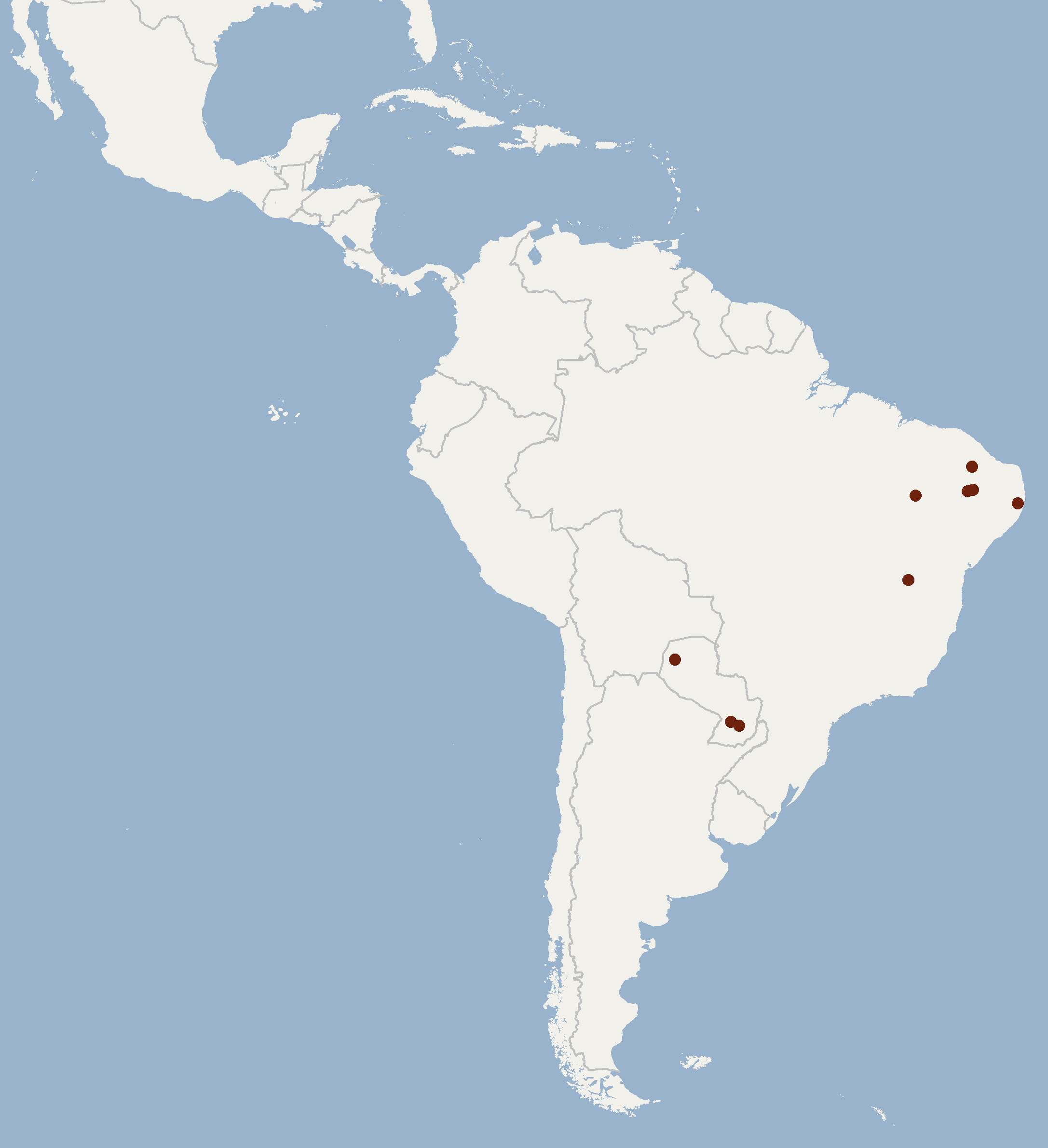
- Distribution of Myotis lavali

Species of mammal

LaVal's myotis (Myotis lavali) is a species of bat found in Brazil and Paraguay.

== Taxonomy ==
This species was described from the Myotis nigricans complex in 2011, based on museum collections from 3 localities in northeastern Brazil. Later on, additional studies confirmed Myotis lavali as a species, and highlight the co-occurrence with M. nigricans in several locations.

== Range and habitat ==
This species was recorded in the Brazilian states of Pernambuco, Bahia, Piauí, Ceará and the north-eastern and south-western parts of Paraguay. Specimens were observed in different ecosystems such as deciduous forests, Cerrado, Caatinga and Gran Chaco, up to 900 meters of altitude.

== Literature cited ==
- Moratelli, R., Peracchi, A. L., Dias, D., & de Oliveira, J. A. 2011.Geographic variation in South American populations of Myotis nigricans (Chiroptera, Vespertilionidae), with the description of two new species. Mammalian Biology - Zeitschrift für Säugetierkunde, 76(5), 592-607.
- Moratelli, R., & Wilson, D. E. 2013. Distribution and natural history of Myotis lavali (Chiroptera, Vespertilionidae). Journal of Mammalogy, 94(3), 650-656.
