= Myotis nustrale =

Conservation status
- Critically Endangered (IUCN 3.1)

Scientific classification
- Kingdom: Animalia
- Phylum: Chordata
- Class: Mammalia
- Order: Chiroptera
- Family: Vespertilionidae
- Genus: Myotis
- Species: M. nustrale

Binomial name
- Myotis nustrale Ruedi, Beuneux & Puechmaille, 2023

Species of bat

Myotis nustrale, the Corsican myotis, is a critically endangered species of vesper bat endemic to the island of Corsica, France.

== Taxonomy ==
The Corsican myotis was described as a new species in 2023. It is part of the Natterer's bat (Myotis natteri) species complex of taxa that appear very similar to one another but are genetically distinct. The holotype was collected in 2006 in Albertacce, Corsica. The species name nustrale is derived from the Corsican word meaning "ours".

== Description ==
The Corsican myotis is a small bat, with a weight of 5.5–9.5 g (0.19–0.34 oz) and a forearm length of 38.4–41.3 mm (1.51–1.63 in). It has a distinctive black spot on the lower lip that differentiates it from other members of the M. natteri species complex.

== Range and habitat ==
The Corsican myotis is endemic to the French island of Corsica where it is found in the mountainous interior, mostly at elevations greater than 500 m (1,600 ft) above sea level. It appears to have a strong preference for roosting in cliffs or rocky areas during the day.

== Conservation ==
As of 2024 the International Union for Conservation of Nature evaluates the Corsican myotis as critically endangered. There are likely only 500-2,000 adult members of the species. Overall few roosts are known and only a single maternity colony has been found. A majority of records of this species are within the Parc naturel régional de Corse. A key conservation priority is protecting the only maternity colony from disturbance. The maternity colony is within a hydroelectric dam gallery, which could be vulnerable to flooding.
