= Jiang Feng (translator) =

Chinese translator and author

- 江枫
- Born: Wu Yunsen (吴云森); July 29, 1929; Shanghai, China
- Died: October 17, 2017 (aged 88); China
- Education: Peking University; Tsinghua University
- Occupations: Translator, author
- Writing career
- Language: Chinese, English
- Period: 1946–2017
- Genre: Poem
- Notable work: The Complete Works of Shelley
- Notable awards: Lu Xun Literary Prize (1997)

Jiang Feng (simplified Chinese: 江枫; traditional Chinese: 江楓; pinyin: Jiāng Fēng; 29 July 1929 – 17 October 2017) was a Chinese literary translator and author who won the Lu Xun Literary Prize (1997), a literary award in China.

He is among the first few in China who translated the works of Percy Bysshe Shelley's into Chinese language.

== Biography ==
Jiang was born Wu Yunsen (吴云森; 吳雲森; Wú Yúnsēn) in Shanghai in July 1929, with his ancestral home in Xi County, Anhui.

Jiang secondary studied at the Southwest United University Attached High School (西南联大附属中学), he graduated from Peking University and Tsinghua University.

In 1946, Jiang served as the chief editor of Chenxing (晨星) and started to publish works.

Jiang joined the People's Liberation Army in 1949.

After the founding of the Communist State, Jiang was appointed a Standing Committee member of the Jiangxi Literature Association.

Jiang served as an associate editor of Honglou (红楼) in 1956.

In 1962, Jiang was transferred to Beijing Edition and Translation Association (北京编译社).

After the Cultural Revolution, Jiang founded Cuncao (寸草) and he served as the chief editor.

Jiang was transferred to Chinese Academy of Social Sciences in 1980 and he joined the China Writers Association in 1983.

In 1996, Jiang became a professor at Tsinghua University.

== Works ==
- Walking in the Frontier Fortress (塞上行)
- The Death of the Carter (车夫之死)

== Translations ==
- The Complete Works of Shelley (Percy Bysshe Shelley) (雪莱全集)
- Poetry of Shelley (Percy Bysshe Shelley) (雪莱抒情诗抄)
- Poetry of Dickinson (Emily Dickinson) (狄金森诗选)
- Contemporary American Poetry (美国现代诗抄)

== Awards ==
- Writing Award (1952)
- Scholastic Award (1954)
- Lu Xun Literary Prize (1997)
- Chinese Translation Association - Lifetime Achievement Award (2012)
