= Myotis phanluongi =

Scientific classification
- Kingdom: Animalia
- Phylum: Chordata
- Class: Mammalia
- Order: Chiroptera
- Family: Vespertilionidae
- Genus: Myotis
- Species: M. phanluongi

Binomial name
- Myotis phanluongi Borisenko, Kruskop and Ivanova, 2008

Species of bat

Myotis phanluongi is a species of mouse-eared bat. It was described by Borisenko et al. in 2008. It is known from Vietnam. Very small Myotis species with forearm length about 34–36 mm, closely related to Myotis siligorensis. Described from the Hon Ba mountain in the Vietnamese province Khanh Hoa; also found on Đà Lạt Plateau.
