= Eastern water bat =

Conservation status
- Least Concern (IUCN 3.1)

Scientific classification
- Kingdom: Animalia
- Phylum: Chordata
- Class: Mammalia
- Order: Chiroptera
- Family: Vespertilionidae
- Genus: Myotis
- Species: M. petax

Binomial name
- Myotis petax Hollister, 1912
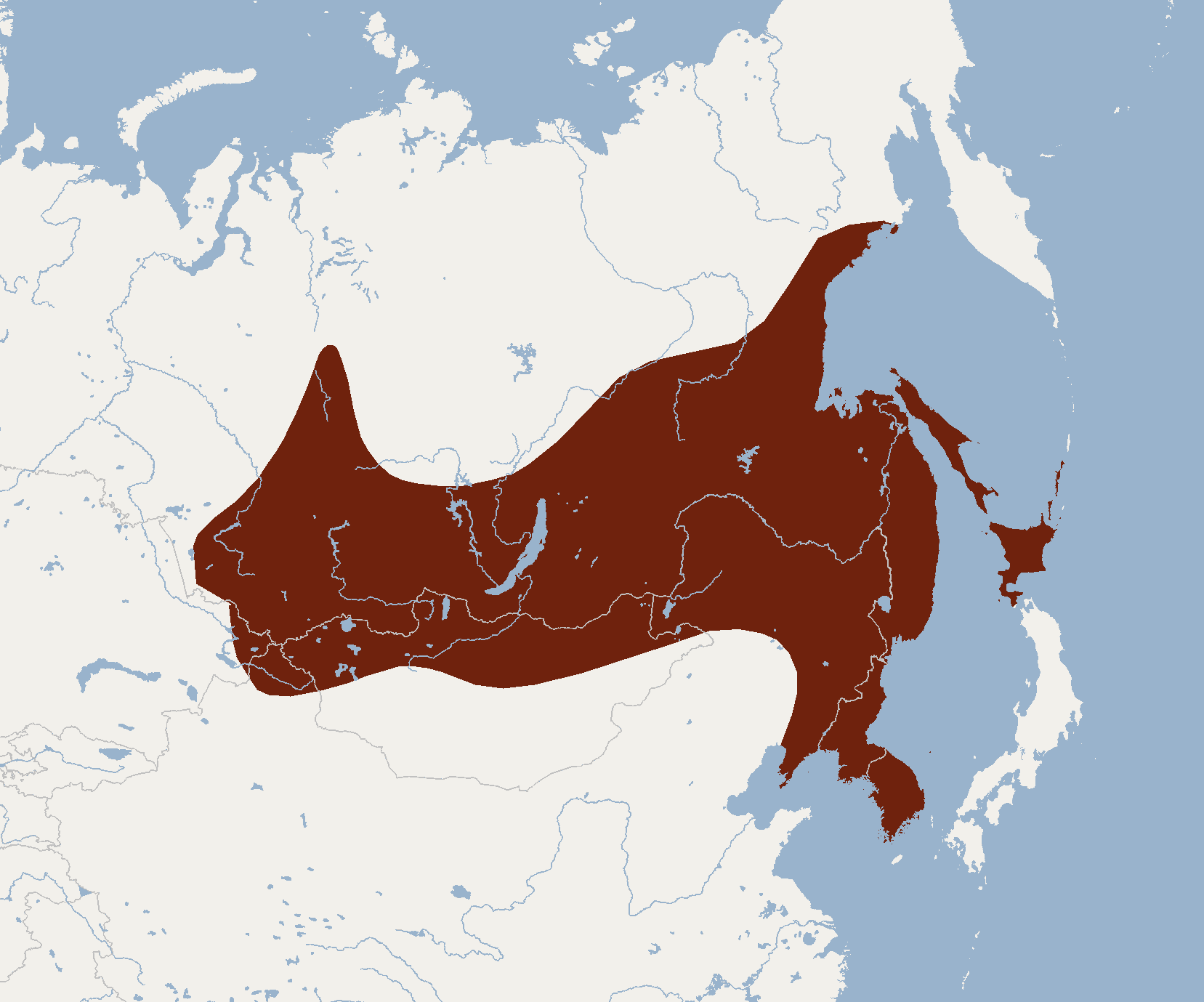

Species of bat

The eastern water bat or Sakhalin bat (Myotis petax) is a species of mouse-eared bat. It was for a long time considered to be a subspecies of Myotis daubentonii.

== Distribution ==
The Eastern water bat is a forest bat found in Russia (south and eastern Siberia, Transbaikalia, Primorye, and Sakhalin), northern China, Mongolia, Korea, and Japan (Hokkaido).
