= Chestnut myotis =

Conservation status
- Data Deficient (IUCN 3.1)

Scientific classification
- Kingdom: Animalia
- Phylum: Chordata
- Class: Mammalia
- Order: Chiroptera
- Family: Vespertilionidae
- Genus: Myotis
- Species: M. badius

Binomial name
- Myotis badius Tiunov, Kruskop and Feng, 2011
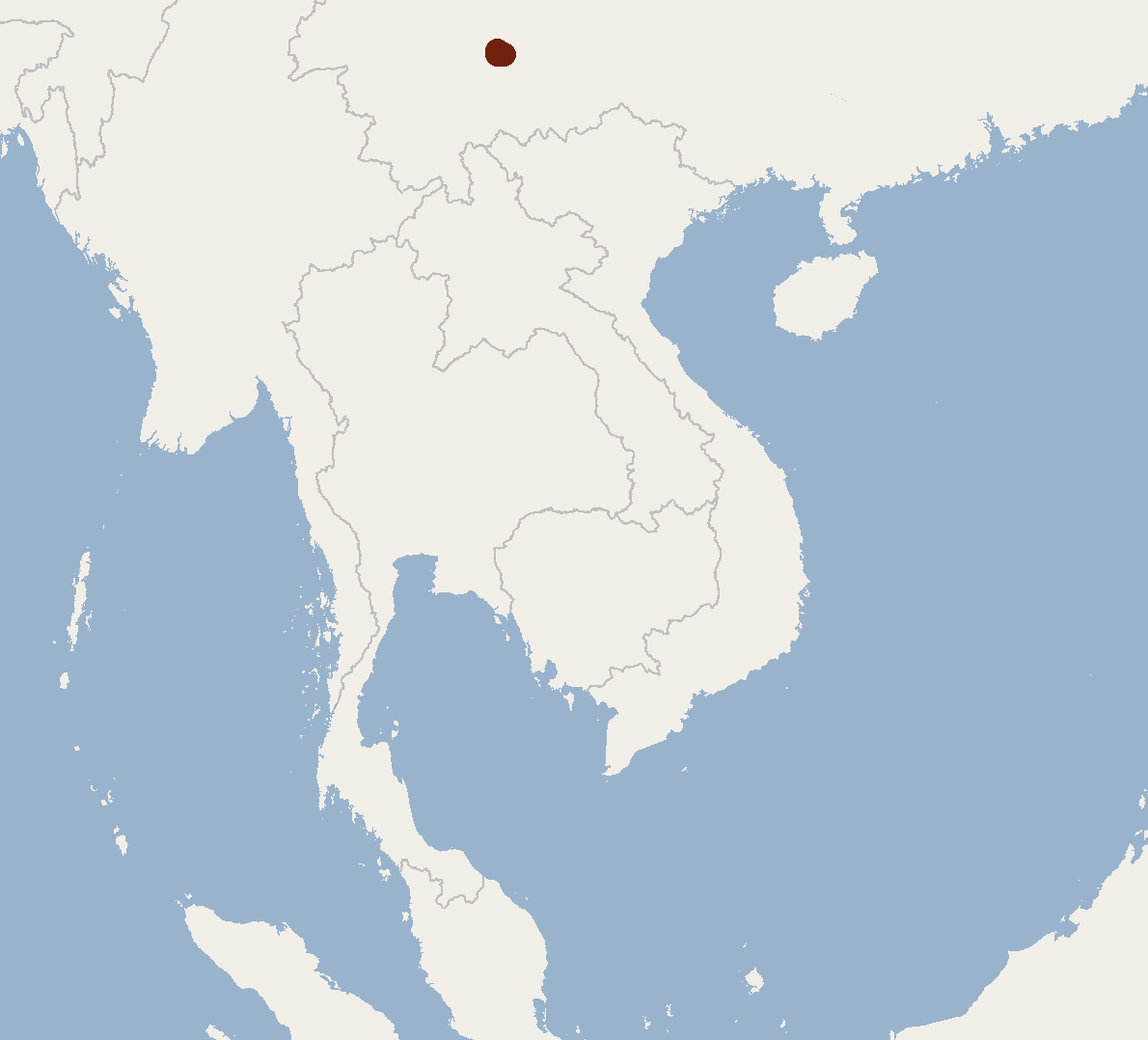
- Distribution of Myotis badius

Species of bat

The chestnut myotis (Myotis badius) is a species of mouse-eared bat in the family Vespertilionidae. It is found in South Asia.

== Taxonomy ==
The bat's initial holotype and paratypes were found in the Longxu, Xianren, Dashi, and Huyan Caves across the Yunnan province in China. Further analysis and comparison of these specimens with other Myotis species suggested that the Yunnan specimens possessed characteristics of baculum morphology and cranial proportions that made them a distinct species.
