= Chinese water myotis =

Conservation status
- Least Concern (IUCN 3.1)]

Scientific classification
- Kingdom: Animalia
- Phylum: Chordata
- Class: Mammalia
- Order: Chiroptera
- Family: Vespertilionidae
- Genus: Myotis
- Species: M. laniger

Binomial name
- Myotis laniger Peters, 1871
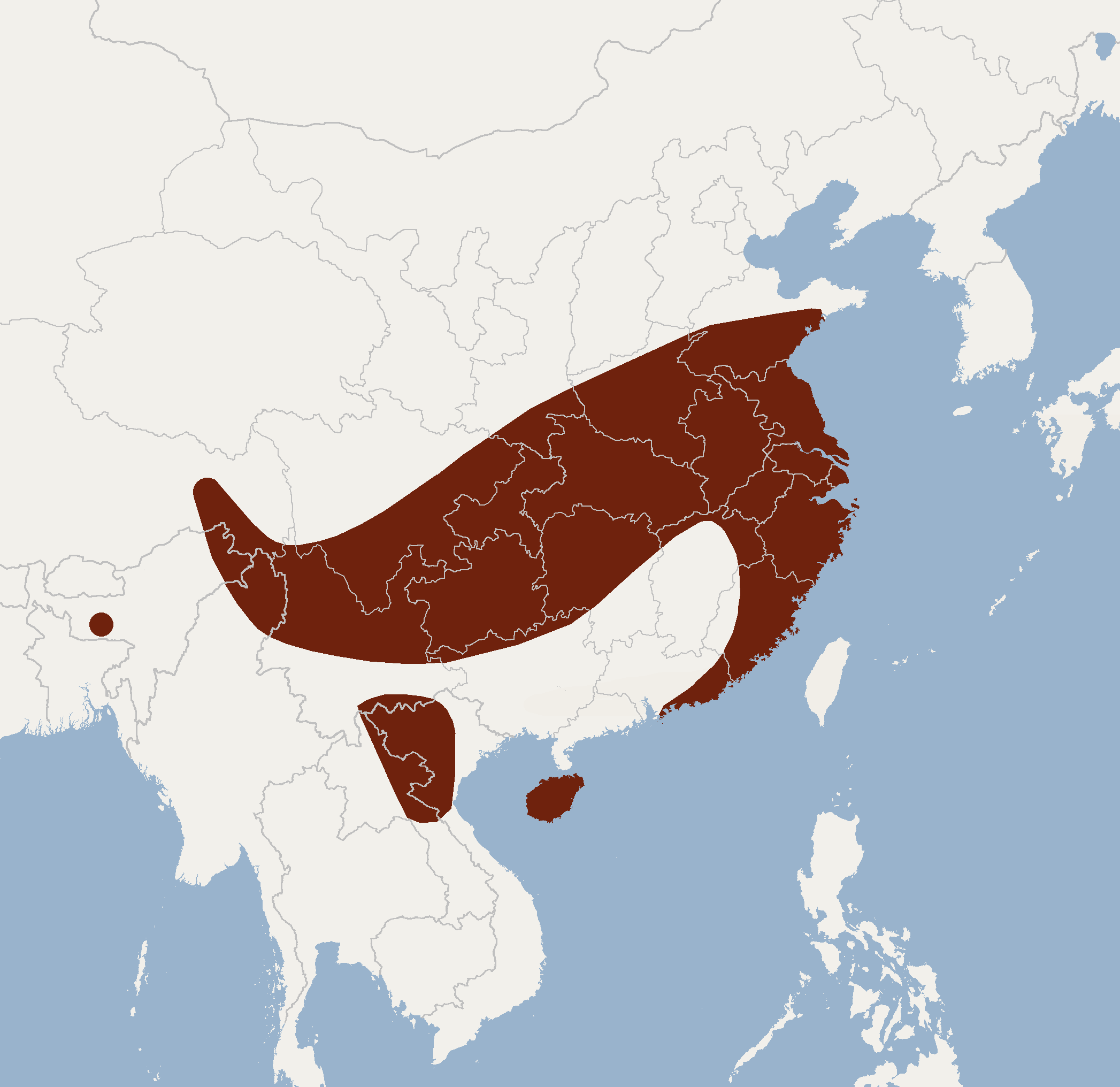

Species of bat

The Chinese water myotis (Myotis laniger) is a species of vesper bat. It is native to eastern India, Vietnam and China where it is found in forest habitats. It is believed to roost in caves and hollow trees.

== Description ==
The Chinese water myotis has grey-brown fur and a whitish underbelly. Its ears are long and pointed, and they can be distinguished by their large hind-feet.

== Echolocation ==
The species uses broadband FM sweeps which last no longer than 7 milliseconds.
