= Himalayan whiskered bat =

Conservation status
- Least Concern (IUCN 3.1)

Scientific classification
- Kingdom: Animalia
- Phylum: Chordata
- Class: Mammalia
- Order: Chiroptera
- Family: Vespertilionidae
- Genus: Myotis
- Species: M. siligorensis

Binomial name
- Myotis siligorensis Horsfield, 1855
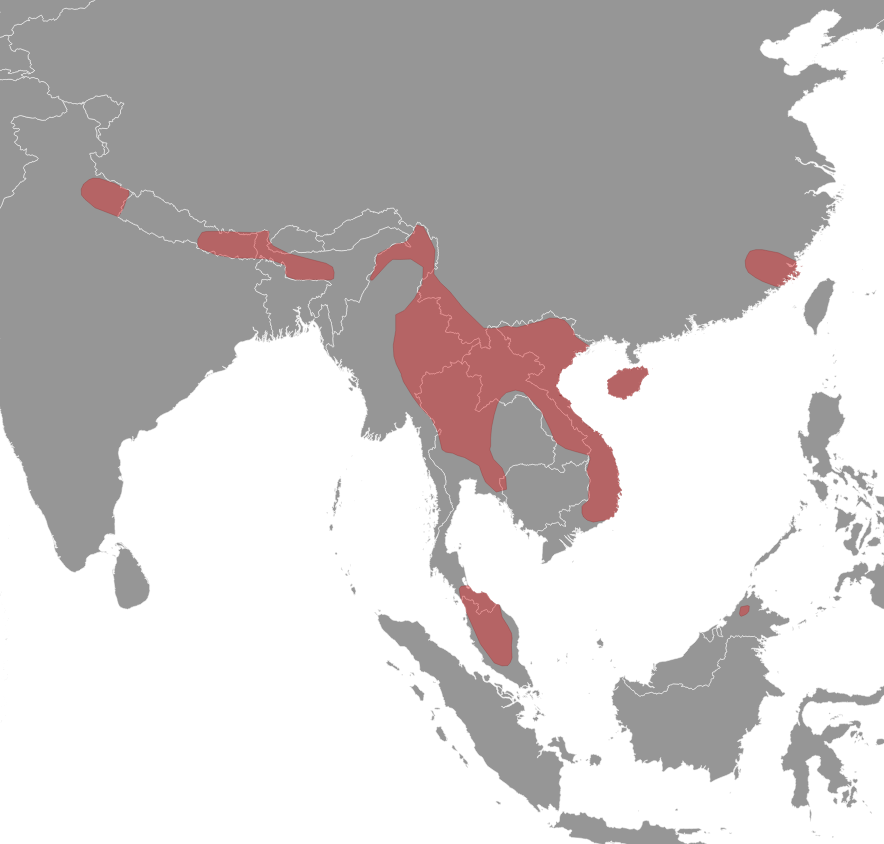

Species of bat

The Himalayan whiskered bat (Myotis siligorensis) is a species of vesper bat. It is found in Bangladesh, Bhutan, Cambodia, China, India, Indonesia, Laos, Malaysia, Nepal, and Vietnam.
