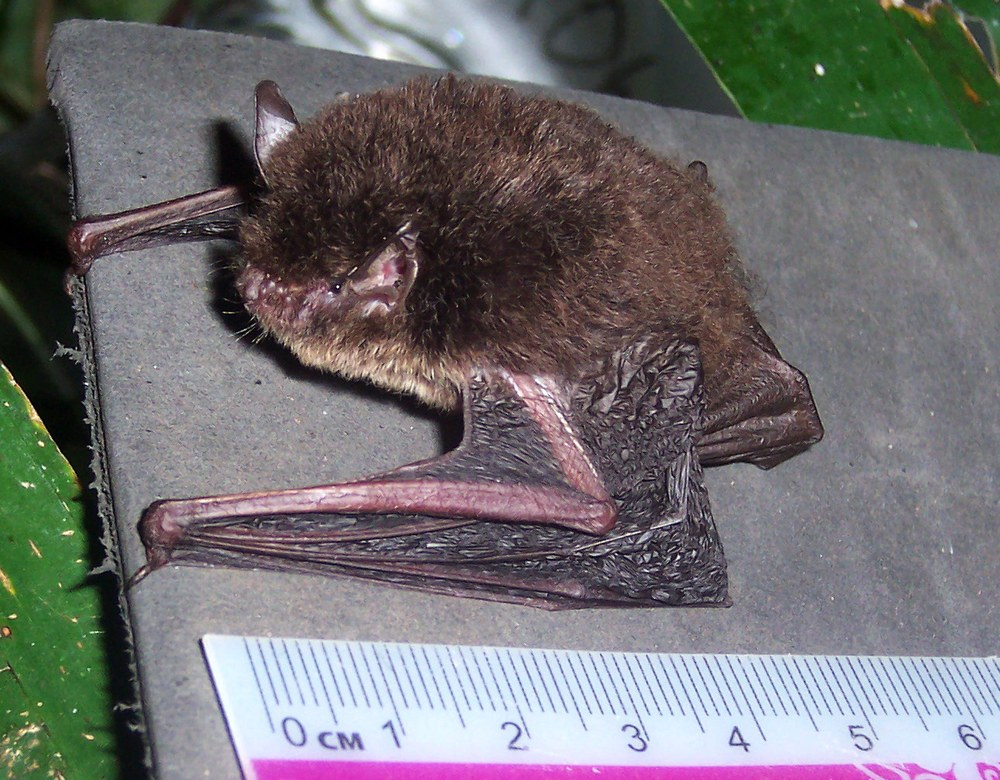
- from Kuningan, West Java

Conservation status
- Least Concern (IUCN 3.1)

Scientific classification
- Kingdom: Animalia
- Phylum: Chordata
- Class: Mammalia
- Order: Chiroptera
- Family: Vespertilionidae
- Genus: Myotis
- Species: M. muricola

Binomial name
- Myotis muricola (Gray, 1846)
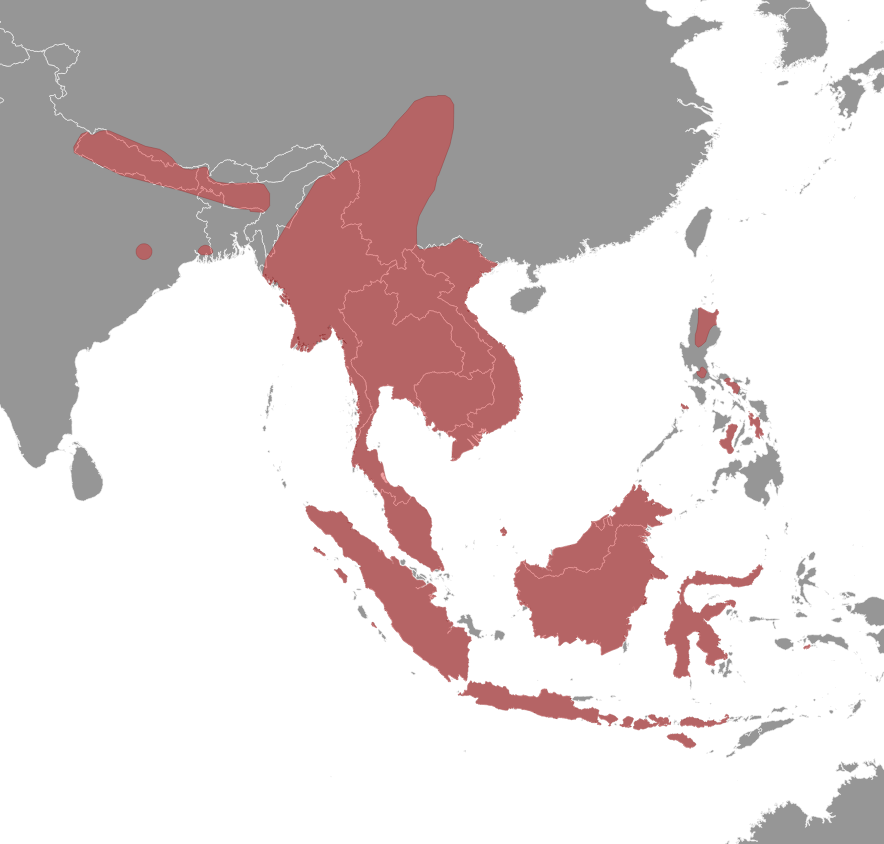

= Wall-roosting mouse-eared bat =

Species of bat

The wall-roosting mouse-eared bat, or Nepalese whiskered myotis (Myotis muricola) is a species of vesper bat whose type locality is Nepal.

== Taxonomic notes ==
Myotis muricola was previously classified as a subspecies of Myotis mystacinus but genetic studies indicate that M. muricola represents a complex of species.

== Morphology ==
The fur on the upper side of M.muricola is coloured brown or grey with dark bases, and the fur on the underside has dark bases and light brown tips. The ears are moderately long, slender, bent forwards and bluntly pointed (Francis, 2008). M.muricola has small feet with wing membranes attached at the base of the toes. The tail is long and completely enclosed in the interfemoral membrane. It has three pairs of premolars, with the upper canine much longer than the third premolar. The second premolar is small and slightly intruded from the tooth row (Yasuma, Andau, Apin, Tuh Yit Yu, & Kimsui, 2003).

== Distributions ==
Myotis muricola is found in Afghanistan, Bangladesh, Bhutan, Cambodia, India, Indonesia, Laos, Malaysia, Myanmar, Nepal, Pakistan, Papua New Guinea, the Philippines, Thailand, and Vietnam (Simmons, 2005).

== Ecology ==
Myotis muricola is a nocturnal and insectivorous bat. It tends to feed during the first two hours after sunset and before dawn, using ultrasonic echolocation (Richardson, 1993). It catches insects in flight or perched on foliage, the ground, or on a water surface. Small insects are usually caught directly in the mouth, while larger ones are scooped out of the air using the tail membrane and flipped into the mouth, or brought to the mouth with the wing tips (Bonaccooso, 1998). It drinks by swooping low over the surface of a body of water, or by collecting droplets of water from the rooves of the tunnels or caves in which it roosts (Richardson, 1993).

== Habitat ==
Myotis muricola roosts in a variety of different sites, including curled-up banana leaves (Francis, 2008), limestone forests (Abdullah, Azlan, & Neuchlos, 2005), hollow trees, rock shelters, artificial caves, mines and tunnels, and old buildings (Richardson, 1993).

== Conservation status ==
According to the 2019 IUCN Red List of Threatened Species, M. muricola is classified as Least Concern.
