= Robert Fisher Tomes =

English farmer and zoologist

Robert Fisher Tomes (4 August 1823 – 10 July 1904) was an English farmer and zoologist.

== Biography ==
Tomes was born in Weston-on-Avon and farmed at Welford, Gloucestershire. He was a specialist in bats, describing a number of new species. His writings included the sections on insectivora and Chiroptera in the second edition of Thomas Bell's History of Quadrupeds.

His interest in ornithology waned, and he resigned from the British Ornithologists Union in 1866. His contributions to the two Victoria County Histories were his only significant ornithological works.

Tomes is buried at South Littleton, Worcestershire. His collection of mammals was sold to the Natural History Museum, and his bird collection was bequeathed to the museum in Worcester.

== Selected bibliography ==
- Occurrence of the Fork-tailed Petrel in Warwickshire Zoologist, 8:2706-2707 (1850)
- On two species of bats inhabiting New Zealand. Proc. Zool. Soc. Lond., pp. 134–42 (1857)
- A monograph of the genus Nyctophilus. Proc. Zool. Soc. Lond., pp. 25–37 (1858)
- Descriptions of six hitherto undescribed species of bats. Proc. Zool. Soc. Lond. pp. 68–79 (1859)
- A monograph of the genus Epomophorus, with a description of a new species. Proc. Zool. Soc. Lond., pp. 42–58 (1860)
- Notes on a third collection of Mammalia, made by Mr. Fraser in the Republic of Ecuador. Proc. Zool. Soc. Lond. pp. 28 (1860)
- Report of a collection of mammals made by Osbert Salvin, Esq., FZS, at Dueñas, Guatemala. Proc. Zool. Soc. Lond. pp. 278 (1861)
- Notice of a new American form of marsupial. Proc. Zool. Soc. Lond., pp. 50–51 (1863)
- On a new genus and species of leaf-nosed bats in the museum at Fort Pitt. Proc. Zool. Soc. Lond., pp. 81–85 (1863)
- On some new or imperfectly known Madreporaria from the Inferior Oolite of Oxfordshire, Gloucestershire, and Dorsetshire. Geol. Mag. 23, 385–98, 443–52. (1886)
- On Heterastraea, a new genus of Madreporaria from the Lower Lias. Geol. Mag. 25, 207–18. (1888)
- Birds. In the Victoria County History of Worcestershire (1901)
- Aves. In the Victoria County History of Warwickshire (1904)

== See also ==
- Osbert Salvin
