= List of data deficient mammals =

- Extinct in the wild (EW): 1 species
- Critically endangered (CR): 236 species
- Endangered (EN): 565 species
- Vulnerable (VU): 571 species
- Near threatened (NT): 405 species
- Least concern (LC): 3,407 species
- Data deficient (DD): 789 species
Mammalian species (IUCN, 2026.1)
- 6,054 extant species have been evaluated
- 5,328 of those are fully assessed (Note: excludes data deficient evaluations.)
- 4,682 are not threatened at present (Note: NT and LC.)
- 1,372 to 2,179 are threatened (Note: Threatened comprises CR, EN and VU. Upper estimate additionally includes DD.)
- 97 to 126 are extinct or extinct in the wild:
  - 96 extinct (EX) species (Note: Chart omits extinct (EX) species)
  - 1 extinct in the wild (EW)
  - 29 possibly extinct [CR(PE)]
  - 0 possibly extinct in the wild [CR(PEW)]

In September 2016, the International Union for Conservation of Nature (IUCN) listed 783 data deficient mammalian species. Of all evaluated mammalian species, 14% are listed as data deficient. The IUCN also lists 31 mammalian subspecies as data deficient.

Of the subpopulations of mammals evaluated by the IUCN, four species and/or subpopulations have been assessed as data deficient.

This is a complete list of data deficient mammalian species and subspecies evaluated by the IUCN. Species and subspecies which have data deficient subpopulations (or stocks) are indicated. Where possible common names for taxa are given while links point to the scientific name used by the IUCN.

== Primates ==
There are 20 species and 26 subspecies of primate evaluated as data deficient.

=== Gibbons ===
Subspecies

- Yunnan lar gibbon

=== Lemurs ===
Species

- Groves' dwarf lemur
- Lesser iron-gray dwarf lemur
- Nosy Boraha mouse lemur

=== Lorisoidea ===
- Makandé squirrel galago

=== Tarsiers ===
- Lariang tarsier

=== Old World monkeys ===
Species

- Osman Hill's mangabey

Subspecies

- Black-nosed red-tailed monkey
- Dodinga Hills guereza
- Djaffa Mountains guereza
- Mau forest guereza
- Dark-crowned long-tailed macaque
- Burmese long-talied macaque
- Simeulue long-tailed macaque
- Kemujan long-tailed macaque
- Lasia long-tailed macaque
- Maratua long-tailed macaque
- East Sumatran banded langur
- Hose's grizzled langur
- Bicolored banded languar
- Miller's maroon langur
- Davis' maroon langur
- Bintan Island pale-thighed langur
- Buff-bellied langur

=== New World monkeys ===
Species

- Hernández-Camacho's night monkey
- Stephen Nash's titi
- Golden-white tassel-ear marmoset
- Vanzolini's bald-faced saki

Subspecies

- Hooded spider monkey
- Lagothrix cana tschudii
- Lako's saddleback tamarin
- Crandall's saddleback tamarin

== Cetartiodactyls ==
Cetartiodactyla includes dolphins, whales and even-toed ungulates. There are 61 species, one subspecies, and three subpopulations of cetartiodactyl evaluated as data deficient.

=== Non-cetacean even-toed ungulates ===
- Silver dik-dik
- Red brocket
- Central American red brocket
- Fea's muntjac
- Gongshan muntjac
- Sumatran muntjac
- Pu Hoat muntjac
- Leaf muntjac
- Roosevelt's muntjac
- Truong Son muntjac
- Walter's duiker
- Java mouse-deer
- Vietnam mouse-deer
- Williamson's mouse-deer

=== Cetaceans ===
There are 45 species, one subspecies, and three subpopulations of cetacean evaluated as data deficient.

==== Oceanic dolphins ====
Species

- Orca

Subpopulations

- Long-finned pilot whale (1 subpopulation)
- Risso's dolphin (1 subpopulation)

==== Beaked whales ====
Species

- Andrews' beaked whale
- Hubbs' beaked whale
- Ginkgo-toothed beaked whale
- Hector's beaked whale
- Spade-toothed whale
- Shepherd's beaked whale

Subpopulations

- Cuvier's beaked whale (1 subpopulation)

==== Baleen whales ====
Species

- Bryde's whale
- Omura's whale

Subspecies

- Pygmy blue whale

== Marsupials ==
- Agricola's gracile opossum
- Guahiba gracile opossum
- Unduavi gracile opossum
- Menzies' echymipera
- Emilia's gracile opossum
- Heavy-browed mouse opossum
- Red mouse opossum
- Tyler's mouse opossum
- Narrow-headed slender opossum
- Creighton's slender opossum
- Dusky slender opossum
- Ihering's three-striped opossum
- Woolley's three-striped dasyure
- Tate's three-striped dasyure
- Olrog's four-eyed opossum
- Chestnut dunnart
- Tate's fat-tailed mouse opossum
- Buff-bellied fat-tailed mouse opossum

== Carnivora ==
Species

=== Mongooses ===
- Pousargues's mongoose

=== Mustelids ===
- Vietnam ferret-badger
- Sichuan weasel
- Tonkin weasel

=== Viverrids ===
- Abyssinian genet
- King genet

Subspecies

- Arctictis binturong kerkhoveni

== Afrosoricida ==
Includes tenrecs and golden moles.

- Somali golden mole
- Visagie's golden mole
- Congo golden mole
- Four-toed rice tenrec

== Pilosa ==
Subpopulations

- Silky anteater (1 subpopulation)

== Eulipotyphla ==
There are 83 species in the order Eulipotyphla evaluated as data deficient.

=== Shrews ===
- Giant mole shrew
- Sumatran water shrew
- Van Sung's shrew
- Pygmy brown-toothed shrew
- Salenski's shrew
- Lesser Taiwanese shrew
- Greater Congo shrew
- Armenian shrew
- Bottego's shrew
- Caspian shrew
- Dhofar shrew
- Heather shrew
- Fischer's shrew
- Flower's shrew
- Peters's musk shrew
- Greater Mindanao shrew
- Hill's shrew
- Horsfield's shrew
- Katinka's shrew
- Savanna swamp shrew
- Mindoro shrew
- Kilimanjaro shrew
- Ugandan musk shrew
- Pale gray shrew
- Phu Hoc shrew
- Pitman's shrew
- Flat-headed shrew
- Polia's shrew
- Kashmir white-toothed shrew
- Chinese white-toothed shrew
- Egyptian pygmy shrew
- Ugandan lowland shrew
- Iranian shrew
- Saharan shrew
- Timor shrew
- Ultimate shrew
- Banka shrew
- Hainan Island shrew
- Zaphir's shrew
- Upemba shrew
- Central Mexican broad-clawed shrew
- Eastern Cordillera small-footed shrew
- Honduran small-eared shrew
- Central American least shrew
- Oaxacan broad-clawed shrew
- Peruvian small-eared shrew
- Tropical small-eared shrew
- Schaller's mouse shrew
- Grauer's large-headed shrew
- Glacier Bay water shrew
- Udine shrew
- Gansu shrew
- Ixtlan shrew
- Kozlov's shrew
- Paramushir shrew
- Ussuri shrew
- New Mexico shrew
- Portenko's shrew
- Chinese shrew
- Tibetan shrew
- Black shrew
- Bornean pygmy shrew
- Mount Kenya mole shrew
- Mount Elgon mole shrew
- Dudu Akaibe's pygmy shrew
- Kongana shrew
- Lesser forest shrew
- Rain forest shrew
- Bamenda pygmy shrew

=== Erinaceids ===
- Long-eared gymnure

=== Talpids ===
- Small-toothed mole
- Père David's mole
- Anderson's shrew mole
- Inquisitive shrew mole

== Lagomorpha ==
Rabbits and relatives

- Sumatran striped rabbit
- Manzano mountain cottontail
- Venezuelan lowland rabbit

== Rodents ==
There are 380 rodent species evaluated as data deficient.

=== Hystricomorpha ===
There are 82 species in Hystricomorpha evaluated as data deficient.

==== Tuco-tucos ====
- Brazilian tuco-tuco
- Budin's tuco-tuco
- Colburn's tuco-tuco
- Puntilla tuco-tuco
- Coyhaique tuco-tuco
- Chacoan tuco-tuco
- Famatina tuco-tuco
- Foch's tuco-tuco
- Lago Blanco tuco-tuco
- San Juan tuco-tuco
- Jujuy tuco-tuco
- Catamarca tuco-tuco
- Tiny tuco-tuco
- San Luis tuco-tuco
- Salta tuco-tuco
- Scaglia's tuco-tuco
- Silky tuco-tuco
- Forest tuco-tuco
- Robust tuco-tuco
- Tucuman tuco-tuco
- Sierra Tontal tuco-tuco
- Strong tuco-tuco
- Vipos tuco-tuco
- Yolanda's tuco-tuco

==== Chinchilla rats ====
- Budin's chinchilla rat
- Famatina chinchilla rat
- Uspallata chinchilla rat
- Punta de Vacas chinchilla rat
- Asháninka arboreal chinchilla rat
- Machu Picchu arboreal chinchilla rat

==== Dasyproctids ====
- Azara's agouti
- Orange agouti
- Iack's agouti
- Kalinowski's agouti
- Brown agouti

==== Neotropical spiny rat species ====
- Owl's spiny rat
- Montane bamboo rat
- Colombian soft-furred spiny rat
- Dark spiny tree-rat
- Vieira's spiny tree-rat
- Barbara Brown's brush-tailed rat
- Orinoco brush-tailed rat (Isothrix orinoci)
- Dusky spiny tree-rat
- Woolly-headed spiny tree-rat
- White-tailed olalla rat
- Greedy olalla rat
- Carriker's speckled tree-rat (Pattonomys carrikeri)
- Yellow speckled tree-rat (Pattonomys flavidus)
- Bare-tailed armored tree-rat
- Orinocan speckled tree-rat (Pattonomys punctatus)
- Kerr's Atlantic tree-rat
- Pallid Atlantic tree-rat
- Southern Atlantic tree rat
- Boyacá spiny rat
- Gardner's spiny rat
- Guyanan spiny rat
- Kulina spiny rat
- Minca spiny rat
- O'Connell's spiny rat
- Trinidad spiny rat
- Thrichomys laurentius
- Peruvian toro
- Dark-caped Atlantic spiny rat
- Spiked Atlantic spiny rat

==== New World porcupines ====
- Baturite porcupine
- Streaked dwarf porcupine
- Black dwarf porcupine
- Andean porcupine
- Roosmalen's dwarf porcupine
- Brown hairy dwarf porcupine

==== Other Hystricomorpha species ====
- Porter's rock rat
- Sage's rock rat
- Sacha Guinea pig
- Val's gundi
- Nigerian mole-rat
- Southern highland yellow-toothed cavy
- Lesser capybara
- Acrobatic cavy
- Ecuadorean viscacha
- Wolffsohn's viscacha
- Kirchner's viscacha rat

=== Myomorpha ===
There are 245 species in Myomorpha evaluated as data deficient.

==== Murids ====
Includes mice, rats, gerbils, and relatives.

- Luzon broad-toothed rat
- Asia Minor spiny mouse
- Crete spiny mouse
- Cyprus spiny mouse
- Selinda veld rat
- Tinfields rock rat
- Ammodile
- Mindoro climbing rat
- Mindanao lowland forest mouse
- Mountain water rat
- Large-toothed hairy-tailed rat
- Kenneth's white-toothed rat
- Manipur white-toothed rat
- Short-footed Luzon tree rat
- Palawan pencil-tailed tree mouse
- Large pencil-tailed tree mouse
- Gray-bellied pencil-tailed tree mouse
- Small pencil-tailed tree mouse
- Sibuyan striped shrew rat
- White-toothed brush mouse
- Dinagat bushy-tailed cloud rat
- Ilin Island cloudrunner
- Celebes shrew rat
- Northern Luzon shrew rat
- Katanglad shrew mouse
- Millard's rat
- Fox's shaggy rat
- Angolan marsh rat
- Crump's mouse
- Berbera gerbil
- Agag gerbil
- Botta's gerbil
- Brockman's gerbil
- Burton's gerbil
- Cosens's gerbil (Gerbillus cosensis)
- Grobben's gerbil
- James's gerbil
- Lowe's gerbil
- Darfur gerbil
- Sudan gerbil
- Occidental gerbil
- Percival's gerbil (Gerbillus percivali)
- Principal gerbil
- Somalian gerbil
- Khartoum gerbil
- Sulawesi root rat
- Arid thicket rat
- Bunting's thicket rat
- Gray-headed thicket rat
- Yunnan bush rat
- Ranee mouse
- Western water rat
- New Britain water rat
- Ziegler's water rat
- Western white-eared giant rat
- Togo mouse
- Hoogstraal's striped grass mouse
- Rosevear's striped grass mouse
- Diwangkara's long-tailed giant rat
- Gray brush-furred rat
- Lesser small-toothed rat
- Little margareta rat
- Dwarf mastomys
- Small Bornean maxomys
- Dollman's spiny rat
- Sumatran spiny rat
- Chestnut-bellied spiny rat
- Sulawesian shrew rat
- Rossel Island melomys
- Bougainville mosaic-tailed rat
- Yamdena mosaic-tailed rat
- Seram long-tailed mosaic-tailed rat
- Riama mosaic-tailed rat
- Pavel's Seram mosaic-tailed rat
- Zarudny's jird
- Northern groove-toothed shrew mouse
- Sumatran shrewlike mouse
- Gounda mouse
- Neave's mouse
- Oubangui mouse
- Ethiopian mylomys
- Limestone rat
- Palawan soft-furred mountain rat
- Short-haired water rat
- Stein's paramelomys
- Hopkins's groove-toothed swamp rat
- Issel's groove-toothed swamp rat
- Malayan tree rat
- Bornean pithecheirops
- Champion's tree-mouse
- Verschuren's swamp rat
- Thin sand rat
- Pseudoberylmys muongbangensis
- German's one-toothed moss mouse
- Musser's shrew mouse
- Western shrew mouse
- White-bellied moss mouse
- Pilliga mouse
- Sunburned rat
- Vogelkop mountain rat
- Aceh rat
- Enggano rat
- Koopman's rat
- Korinch's rat
- Mindoro black rat
- Arianus's rat
- Peleng rat
- Southeastern xanthurus rat
- Tawitawi forest rat
- Timor rat
- Banahao shrew rat
- Tapulao shrew-rat
- Paulina's limestone rat
- Florida naked-tailed rat
- Sommer's Sulawesi rat
- Rupp's mouse
- Salokko rat
- Lovely-haired rat
- Sulawesi montane rat
- Small-eared rat
- Sulawesi forest rat
- Tondano rat
- Long-tailed shrew rat
- Tate's shrew rat
- Shortridge's rat
- Schouteden's thicket rat (Thamnomys schoutedeni)
- Daovantien's limestone rat
- Luzon short-nosed rat
- Great Key Island giant rat

==== Cricetids ====
Includes true hamsters, voles, lemmings, and New World rats and mice.

- Diminutive akodont
- Catamarca akodont
- Lindbergh's grass mouse
- Caparaó grass mouse
- Neuquén grass mouse
- Monte akodont
- Tarija akodont
- Philip Myers' akodont
- São Paulo grass mouse
- Variable grass mouse
- White-tailed mountain vole
- Lake Baikal mountain vole
- Ucayali water rat
- White-nosed akodont
- Gray-bellied akodont
- Guaraní akodont
- Red-bellied akodont
- Misiones akodont
- Arroyo of Paradise brucie
- Soricine brucie
- Anderson's rice rat
- Marinho's rice rat
- Magellanic long-clawed akodont
- Las Cajas water mouse
- Chibchan water mouse
- Unalaska collared lemming
- Wrangel lemming
- Alai mole vole
- Gray rice rat
- Patagonian chinchilla mouse
- Burrowing chinchilla mouse
- Emmons's rice rat
- Garlepp's mouse
- Central leaf-eared mouse
- Edith's leaf-eared mouse
- Hylaeamys acritus
- Hylaeamys tatei
- Stolzmann's crab-eating rat
- Tweedy's crab-eating rat
- Rio Guaporé mouse
- Huanchaca mouse
- Wrangel Island lemming
- Anatolian vole
- Evorsk vole
- Felten's vole
- Persian vole
- Muisk vole
- Nasarov's vole (Microtus nasarovi)
- Painted bristly mouse
- Spotted bolo mouse
- Nectomys magdalenae
- Forrest's mountain vole
- Linzhi mountain vole
- Ferreira's fish-eating rat
- Oyapock's fish-eating rat
- Cleber's arboreal rice rat
- Brazilian arboreal rice rat
- Brenda's colilargo
- Oligoryzomys moojeni
- Oligoryzomys rupestris
- Peruvian rice rat
- Curaçao rice rat
- Argentine hocicudo
- Blackish deer mouse
- Peromyscus sagax
- Anita's leaf-eared mouse
- Osgood's leaf-eared mouse
- Liangshan vole
- Sonoran harvest mouse
- Nicaraguan harvest mouse
- Cariri climbing mouse
- Cauca climbing mouse
- Yellow-bellied climbing mouse
- Delicate salt flat mouse
- Harris's rice water rat
- Silky Oldfield mouse
- Hudson's Oldfield mouse
- Popayán Oldfield mouse
- Cajamarca Oldfield mouse
- Thomas's Oldfield mouse
- Rosalinda's Oldfield mouse
- Pichincha Oldfield mouse
- Fulvous-bellied climbing rat
- Panamanian climbing rat
- Marie's vole
- Cerrado red-nosed mouse

==== Nesomyids ====
- Rupp's African climbing mouse
- Vernay's climbing mouse
- Velvet climbing mouse
- Tsingy tufted-tailed rat
- Ellerman's tufted-tailed rat
- Petter's big-footed mouse
- Dollman's tree mouse
- Jackson's fat mouse

==== Dipodids ====
- Iranian jerboa
- Four-toed jerboa
- Five-toed pygmy jerboa
- Thaler's jerboa
- Baluchistan pygmy jerboa
- Heptner's pygmy jerboa
- Pale pygmy jerboa
- Long-tailed birch mouse
- Gray birch mouse

==== Mouse-like hamsters ====
- Tsolov's mouse-like hamster

=== Castorimorpha ===
- Lined pocket mouse

=== Sciuromorpha ===
There are 50 species in Sciuromorpha evaluated as data deficient.

==== Sciurids ====
Squirrels, chipmunks, marmots, susliks and prairie dogs

- Black flying squirrel
- Hairy-footed flying squirrel
- Kloss's squirrel
- Least pygmy squirrel
- Lunda rope squirrel
- Du Chaillu's rope squirrel
- Kintampo rope squirrel
- Sculptor squirrel
- Small sun squirrel
- Zanj sun squirrel
- Bartel's flying squirrel
- Gray-cheeked flying squirrel
- Jentink's flying squirrel
- Sumatran flying squirrel
- Niobe ground squirrel
- Santander dwarf squirrel
- Cooper's mountain squirrel
- Black and red bush squirrel
- Lesser pygmy flying squirrel
- Hose's pygmy flying squirrel
- Selangor pygmy flying squirrel
- Hagen's flying squirrel
- Arrow flying squirrel
- Secretive dwarf squirrel
- Weber's dwarf squirrel
- Slender-tailed squirrel
- Neotropical pygmy squirrel
- Arizona gray squirrel
- Fiery squirrel
- Yellow-throated squirrel
- Bolivian squirrel
- Andean squirrel
- Junín red squirrel
- Sanborn's squirrel
- Davao squirrel
- Palawan montane squirrel

==== Dormice ====
- Chinese dormouse
- Woolly dormouse
- Angolan African dormouse
- Jentink's dormouse
- Johnston's African dormouse
- Monard's dormouse
- Silent dormouse
- Masked mouse-tailed dormouse
- Setzer's mouse-tailed dormouse
- Desert dormouse

== Cingulata ==
- Greater fairy armadillo
- Pink fairy armadillo
- Hairy long-nosed armadillo
- Yepes's mulita

== Bats ==
There are 191 species and one subspecies of bat evaluated as data deficient.

=== Megabats ===
- Ansell's epauletted fruit bat
- Lesser Angolan epauletted fruit bat
- Hayman's dwarf epauletted fruit bat
- Round-eared tube-nosed fruit bat
- Dragon tube-nosed fruit bat
- Demonic tube-nosed fruit bat
- Nendo tube-nosed fruit bat
- Andersen's flying fox
- Kei flying fox
- Lombok flying fox
- Okinawa flying fox
- Philippine gray flying fox
- Linduan rousette

=== Microbats ===
There are 171 species and one subspecies of microbat evaluated as data deficient.

==== Old World leaf-nosed bats ====
Species

- Boeadi's roundleaf bat
- Short-headed roundleaf bat
- Greater roundleaf bat
- Large Mindanao roundleaf bat
- Timor roundleaf bat
- Crested roundleaf bat
- Big-eared roundleaf bat
- Malayan roundleaf bat

Subspecies

- Philippine tailless leaf-nosed bat

==== Horseshoe bats ====
- Adam's horseshoe bat
- Convex horseshoe bat
- Insular horseshoe bat
- Maendeleo horseshoe bat
- Mitred horseshoe bat
- Neriad horseshoe bat
- Sakeji horseshoe bat
- Forest horseshoe bat
- Small rufous horseshoe bat

==== Vesper bats ====
- Surat serotine
- Kobayashi's bat
- Lagos serotine
- Sombre bat
- Pungent pipistrelle
- Peters's pipistrelle
- Curry's bat
- Bibundi bat
- Glen's wattled bat
- Allen's spotted bat
- Kenyan wattled bat
- Machado's butterfly bat
- Javan thick-thumbed bat
- Peter's tube-nosed bat
- False serotine bat
- Gaskell's false serotine
- Strange big-eared brown bat
- Humboldt big-eared brown bat
- Tropical big-eared brown bat
- Anthony's pipistrelle
- Joffre's pipistrelle
- Red-brown pipistrelle
- Burma pipistrelle
- Big-eared pipistrelle
- Vordermann's pipistrelle
- Copper woolly bat
- Ethiopian woolly bat
- Angolan long-eared bat
- Tacarcuna bat
- Hairy-tailed bat
- Big red bat
- Dusky tube-nosed bat
- Southern myotis
- Alcathoe whiskered bat
- Anjouan myotis
- Annamit myotis
- Australian myotis
- Bocharic myotis
- Guatemalan myotis
- Csorba's mouse-eared bat
- Kock's mouse-eared bat
- Herman's myotis
- Insular myotis
- Kashmir cave bat
- Morris's bat
- Singapore whiskered bat
- Felten's myotis
- Orange-fingered myotis
- Schaub's myotis
- Velvety myotis
- Kei myotis
- Yellow serotine
- Heller's pipistrelle
- Melck's house bat
- Temminck's mysterious bat
- Sunda long-eared bat
- Dubious trumpet-eared bat
- Mount Gargues pipistrelle
- Arabian pipistrelle
- Desert pipistrelle
- Eisentraut's pipistrelle
- Aellen's pipistrelle
- Minahassa pipistrelle
- Mouselike pipistrelle
- Dar es Salaam pipistrelle
- Racey's pipistrelle bat
- Ethiopian big-eared bat
- Christie's big-eared bat
- Husson's yellow bat
- Light-winged lesser house bat
- Lesser yellow bat
- Sulawesi yellow bat
- Robbins's yellow bat
- Malagasy yellow bat

==== Long-fingered bats ====
- Miniopterus griveaudi
- Least long-fingered bat
- Miniopterus newtoni
- Peterson's long-fingered bat

==== Sac-winged bats ====
- Greater ghost bat
- Trinidad dog-like bat
- Amazonian sac-winged bat
- Indonesian tomb bat
- Hamilton's tomb bat

==== Free-tailed bats ====
- Gallagher's free-tailed bat
- Russet free-tailed bat
- Cinnamon dog-faced bat
- Para dog-faced bat
- Guianan bonneted bat
- Rufous dog-faced bat
- Barnes' mastiff bat
- Niangara free-tailed bat
- Sulawesi free-tailed bat
- Trevor's free-tailed bat
- Sumatran mastiff bat
- Daubenton's free-tailed bat
- Javan mastiff bat
- Johnstone's mastiff bat
- Big-eared mastiff bat
- Mantled mastiff bat
- Wroughton's free-tailed bat
- East Asian free-tailed bat
- African giant free-tailed bat

==== Leaf-nosed bats ====
- Tube-lipped nectar bat
- Honduran fruit-eating bat
- Rosenberg's fruit-eating bat
- Behn's bat
- Chocoan long-tongued bat
- Orcés' long-tongued bat
- Northern sword-nosed bat
- Brosset's big-eared bat
- Matses' big-eared bat
- Koepcke's hairy-nosed bat
- Least big-eared bat
- Shadowy broad-nosed bat
- Mistratoan yellow-shouldered bat
- Soriano's yellow-shouldered bat
- Greater round-eared bat
- Southern little yellow-eared bat
- Vieira's long-tongued bat

==== Slit-faced bats ====
- Malagasy slit-faced bat
- Ja slit-faced bat
- Parissi's slit-faced bat
- Vinson's slit-faced bat

==== Mouse-tailed bats ====
- Macinnes's mouse-tailed bat

==== Disc-winged bats ====
- De Vivo's disk-winged bat
- LaVal's disk-winged bat

== Elephant shrews ==
- Dusky-footed elephant shrew
- Dusky elephant shrew
- Karoo rock elephant shrew
- Somali sengi

== Treeshrews ==
- Bornean smooth-tailed treeshrew
- Striped treeshrew

== See also ==
- Lists of IUCN Red List data deficient species
- List of least concern mammals
- List of near threatened mammals
- List of vulnerable mammals
- List of endangered mammals
- List of critically endangered mammals
- List of recently extinct mammals
