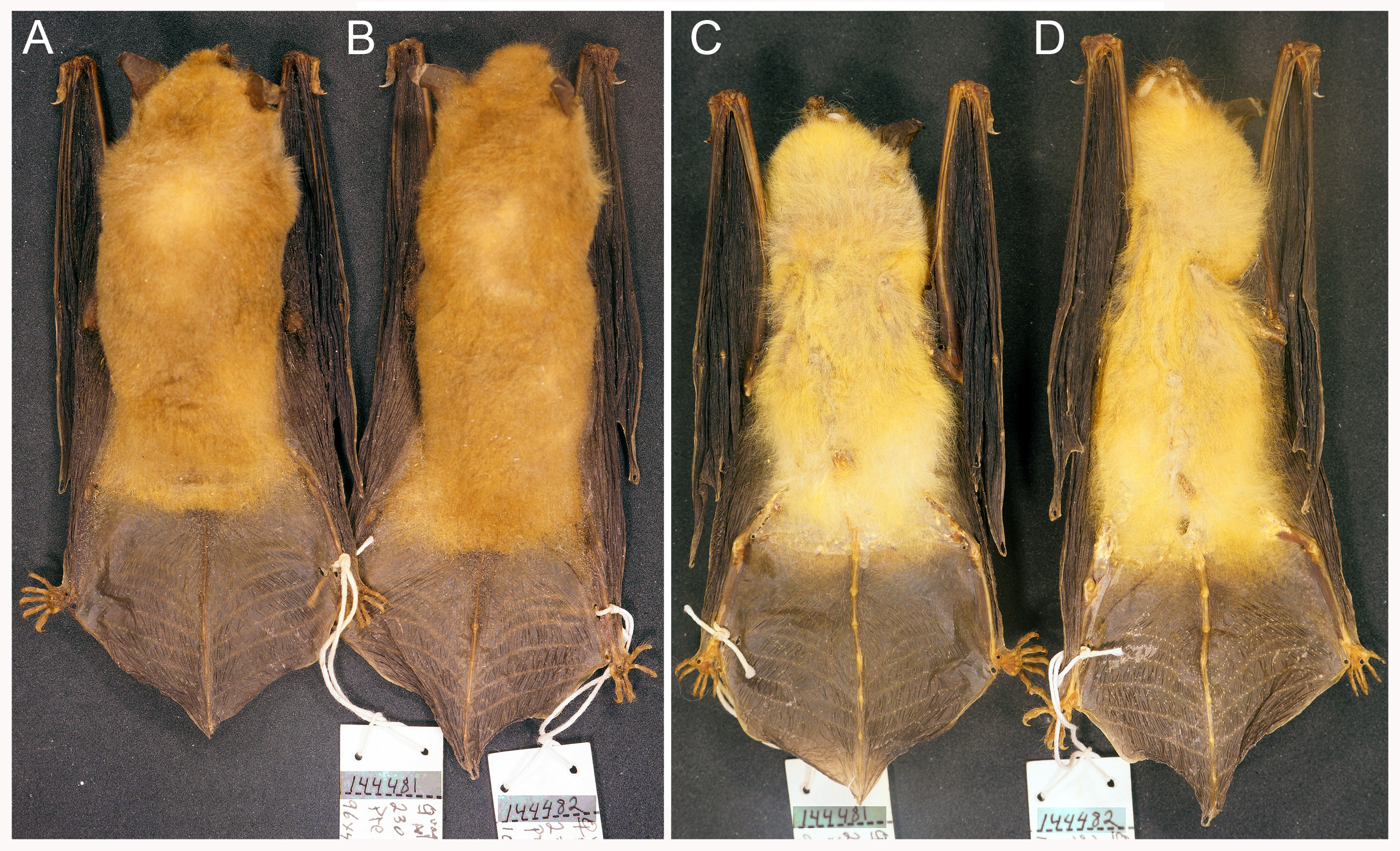
- Specimens in dorsal and ventral view

Scientific classification
- Kingdom: Animalia
- Phylum: Chordata
- Class: Mammalia
- Order: Chiroptera
- Family: Vespertilionidae
- Genus: Myotis
- Species: M. midastactus

Binomial name
- Myotis midastactus Moratelli & Wilson, 2014

Synonyms
- Myotis sima

= Myotis midastactus =

Species of bat

Myotis midastactus is a golden-coloured species of vesper bats from South America, where it occurs in Bolivia and Paraguay. The characteristic golden fur of the bat distinguishes it from other South American bats.
