= Australian myotis =

Conservation status
- Data Deficient (IUCN 3.1)

Scientific classification
- Kingdom: Animalia
- Phylum: Chordata
- Class: Mammalia
- Order: Chiroptera
- Family: Vespertilionidae
- Genus: Myotis
- Species: M. australis

Binomial name
- Myotis australis Dobson, 1878
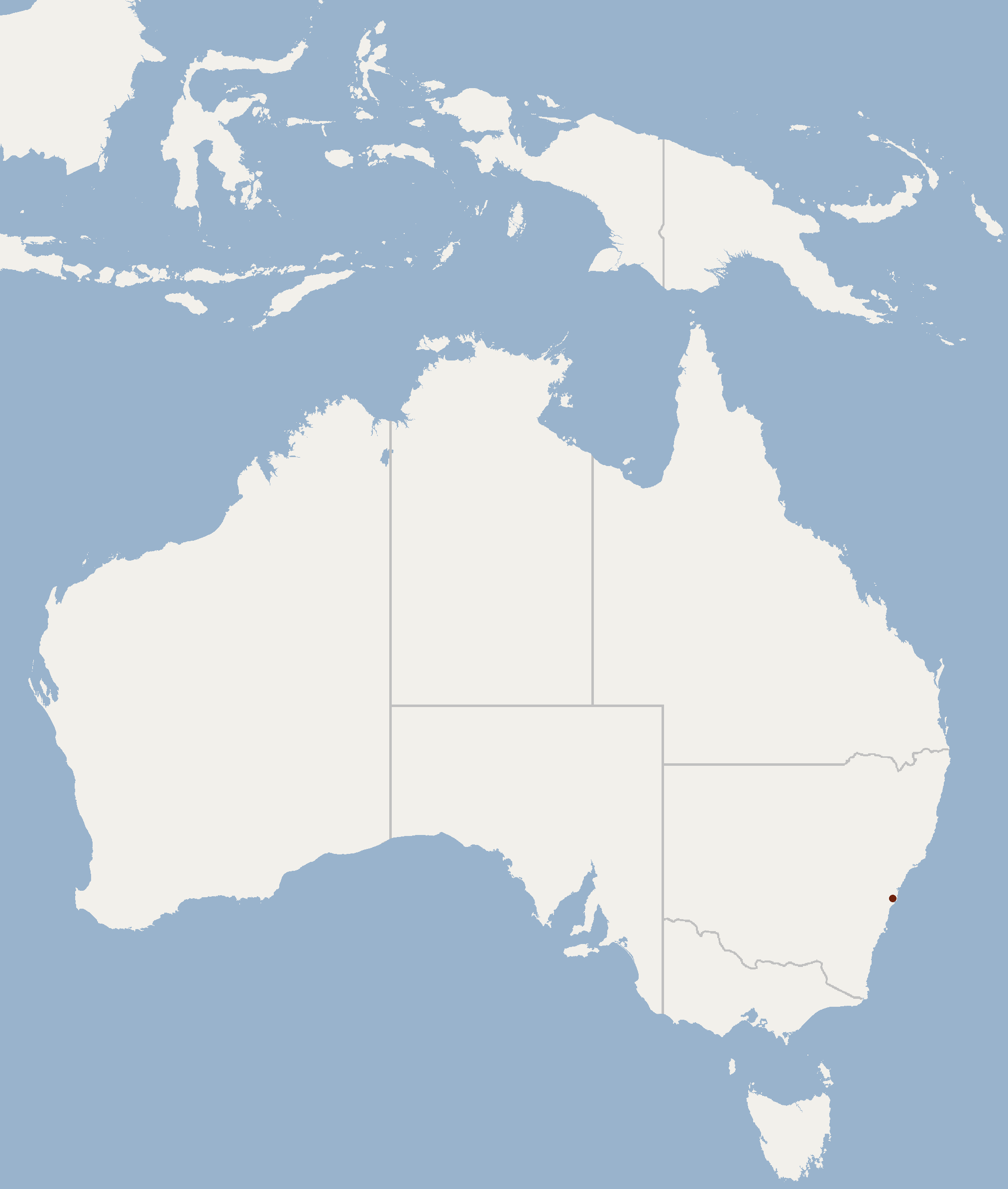

Synonyms
- Vespertilio australis Dobson, 1878

Species of bat

The Australian myotis (Myotis australis) is a species of vesper bat. It is found only in Australia. This taxa may not represent a valid species. Only one specimen has ever been documented, supposedly from Sydney, New South Wales. This specimen may have been mislabelled or a vagrant Myotis muricola or Myotis ater.

== Taxonomy and etymology ==
It was described as a new species in 1878 by Irish zoologist George Edward Dobson after the supposed type specimen was collected from Sydney. Dobson named the species Vespertilio australis. Due to concerns about the accuracy of Dobson's initial record, as well as the fact that the species has not been detected since, the Australian myotis is largely regarded as an erroneous record. The large-footed myotis is generally considered to be the only member of its genus in Australia.

== Description ==
It is a small species of bat with a body length of 1.5 in (3.8 cm). Its fur is brown, short, and dense. The uropatagium has a "narrow but distinct" calcar. Its tragi are slightly curved.

== Conservation ==
As of 2020, it is listed as a data deficient species by the IUCN. It meets the criteria for this classification because of ongoing doubts surrounding its taxonomic validity and a lack of information about its range, biology, and threats it faces.
