= Anjouan myotis =

Conservation status
- Data Deficient (IUCN 3.1)

Scientific classification
- Kingdom: Animalia
- Phylum: Chordata
- Class: Mammalia
- Order: Chiroptera
- Family: Vespertilionidae
- Genus: Myotis
- Species: M. anjouanensis

Binomial name
- Myotis anjouanensis Dorst, 1960
- Anjouan myotis range

Synonyms
- Myotis goudoti anjouanensis Dorst, 1960

Species of bat

The Anjouan myotis (Myotis anjouanensis) is a species of vesper bat. It is found only in Comoros.

== Taxonomy and etymology ==
It was described as a new species in 1960 by French zoologist Jean Dorst. Dorst described the species based on specimens that had been collected by Léon Humblot in 1886. It has variably been considered a subspecies of the Malagasy mouse-eared bat. However, in 1995 and 2005, it was published as a full species. The species name "anjouanensis" means "belonging to Anjouan"—the island where the holotype was collected.

== Range and habitat ==
It is found only on Anjouan island of the Comoros. The individual observed in 2006 was captured flying through a tunnel surrounded by "heavily disturbed forest" and agricultural plots.

== Conservation ==
As of 2019, it is evaluated as a data deficient species by the IUCN. It is a rarely-observed species. A single individual was captured in 2006, representing perhaps the first documentation of this species in over 120 years.
