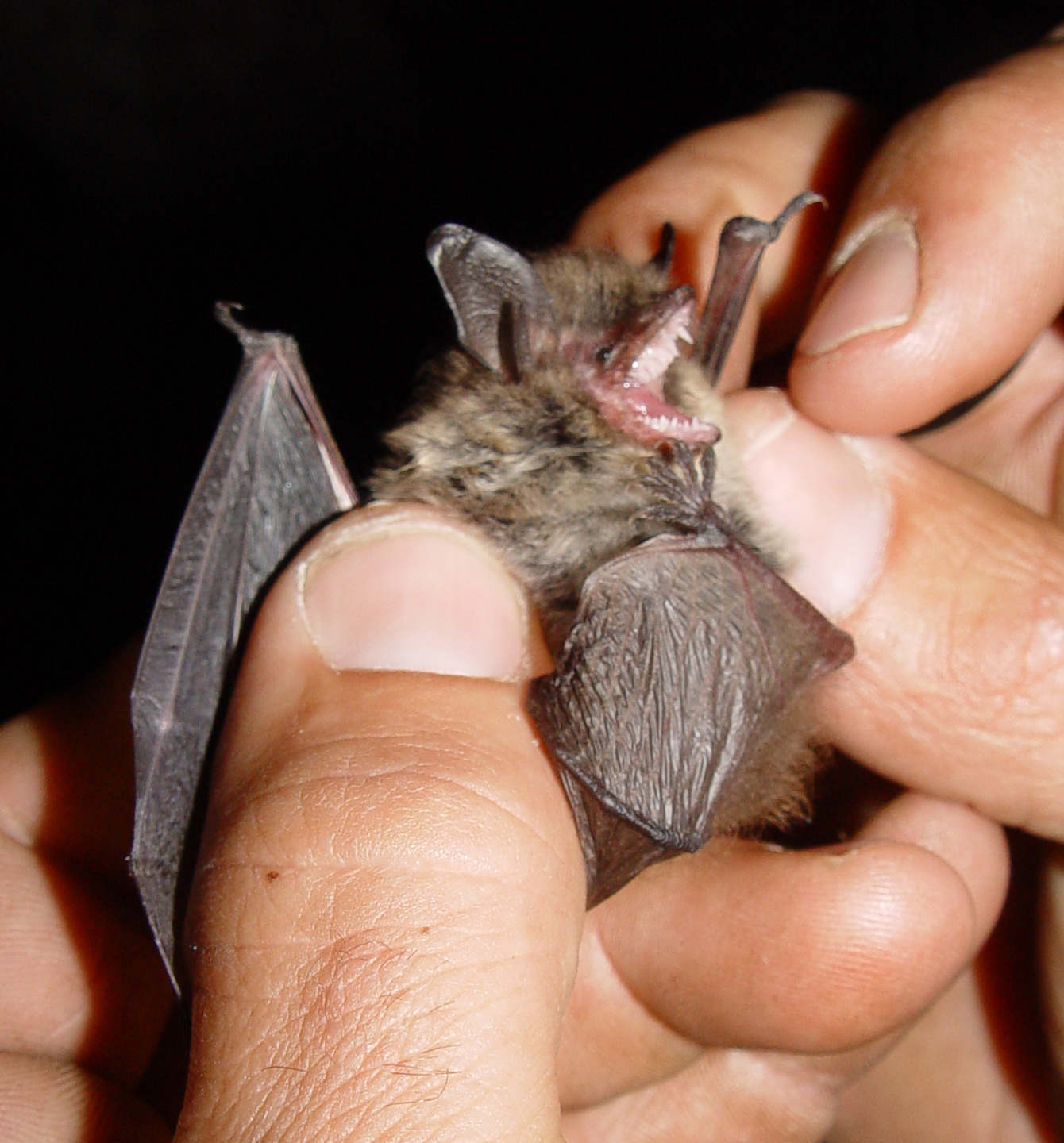
- Whiskered bat (Myotis mystacinus)

Scientific classification
- Kingdom: Animalia
- Phylum: Chordata
- Class: Mammalia
- Order: Chiroptera
- Family: Vespertilionidae
- Subfamily: Myotinae
- Genus: Myotis; Kaup, 1829

Type species
- Vespertilio myotis Borkhausen, 1797

Species
- See text

= Mouse-eared bat =

Mouse-eared bats Temporal range: Early Oligocene to present, 33–0 Ma

Genus of bats

The mouse-eared bats or myotises are a diverse and widespread genus (Myotis) of bats within the family Vespertilionidae. The noun "myotis" itself is a Neo-Latin construction, from the Greek "muós (meaning "mouse") and "oûs" (meaning ear), literally translating to "mouse-eared".

== Relationships ==
Myotis has historically been included in the subfamily Vespertilioninae, but was classified in its own subfamily, Myotinae, by Nancy Simmons in 1998. In her 2005 classification in Mammal Species of the World, Simmons listed the genera Cistugo and Lasionycteris in the Myotinae in addition to Myotis itself. However, molecular data indicate that Cistugo is distantly related to all other Vespertilionidae, so it was reclassified into its own family, the Cistugidae, and that Lasionycteris belongs in the Vespertilioninae. The genus Submyotodon has since been added to the subfamily, making it and Myotis its only members.

== Appearance and behavior ==
Their ears are normally longer than they are wide, with a long and lance-shaped tragus, hence their English and zoological names. The species within this genus vary in size from very large to very small for vesper bats, with a single pair of mammary glands.

Mouse-eared bats are generally insectivores. M. vivesi, and several members of the trawling bat ecomorph Leuconoe, have relatively large feet with long toes, and take small fish from the water surface (they also take insects).

== Longevity ==
Myotis species are remarkably long-lived for their size; in 2018, researchers revealed that a longitudinal study appears to indicate that Myotis telomeres do not shrink with age, and that telomerase does not appear to be present in the Myotis metabolism. 13 species of Myotis bats live longer than 20 years and 4 species live longer than 30 years. The longest-living species of Myotis, and longest-living bat in general, is thought to be the Siberian bat (M. sibiricus); one individual discovered in 2005 was found to be over 41 years old at the time.

== Species ==
- Myotinae
  - Submyotodon
  - Myotis
    - Most Old World species
    - - Most Nearctic species
      - - Myotis brandtii & Myotis sibiricus
        - Neotropical and some Nearctic species

Relationships among Myotis species according to molecular data

Traditionally, Myotis was divided into three large subgenera—Leuconoe, Myotis, and Selysius. However, molecular data indicate that these subgenera are not natural groups, but instead unnatural assemblages of convergently similar species. Instead, Myotis species largely fall in two main clades, one containing Old World and the other New World species. The ITIS presently divides it into three subgenera: Chrysopteron (containing most reddish-colored Old World species), Myotis (containing almost all other Old World species), and Pizonyx (containing all New World species and the Eurasian Myotis brandtii and Myotis sibiricus, which are more closely related to New World species than to other Old World species). The Asian species Myotis latirostris falls outside the clade formed by these main groups, and has since been reclassified into a separate genus, Submyotodon, alongside several others.

The earliest known fossil Myotis is the extinct, large-sized species †Myotis belgicus Gunnel, Smith & Smith, 2017 from the Early Oligocene of Belgium.

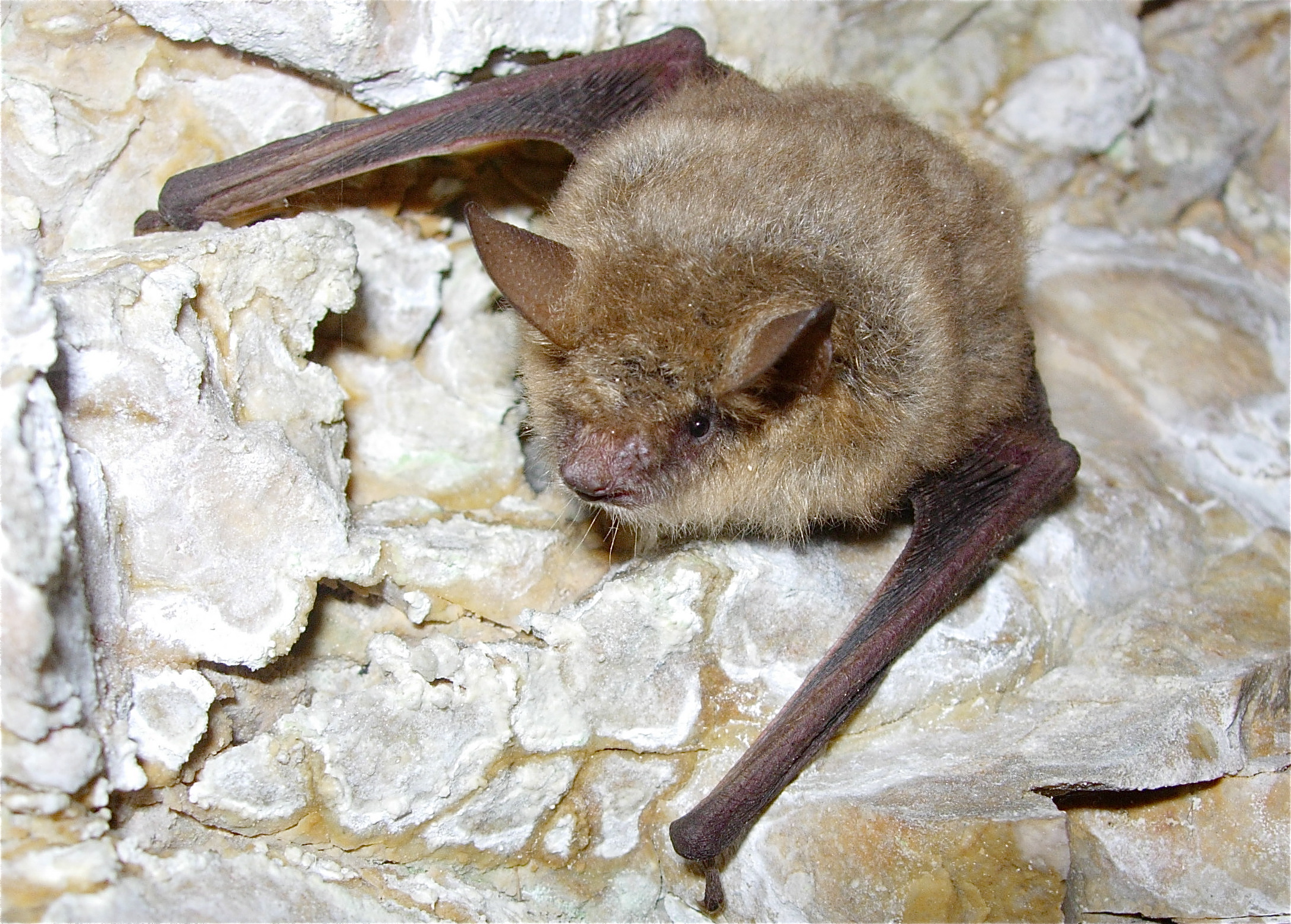
Geoffroy's bat

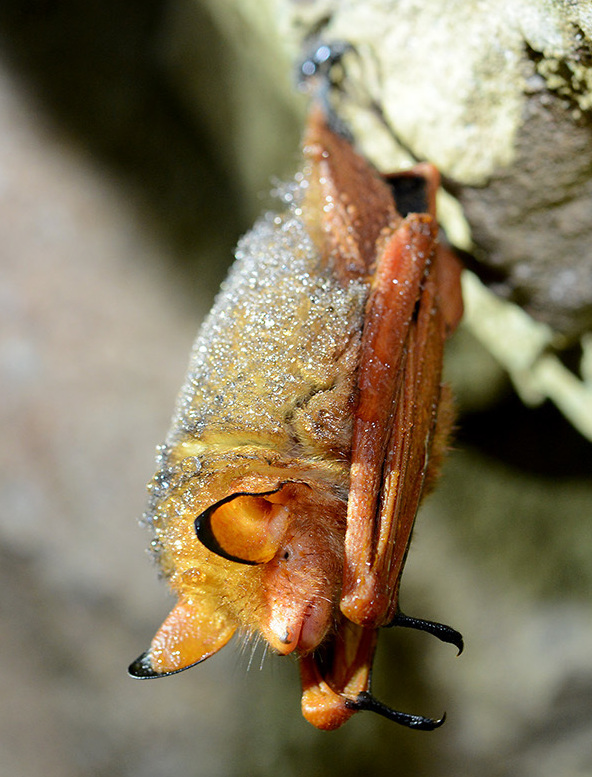
Black-winged myotis

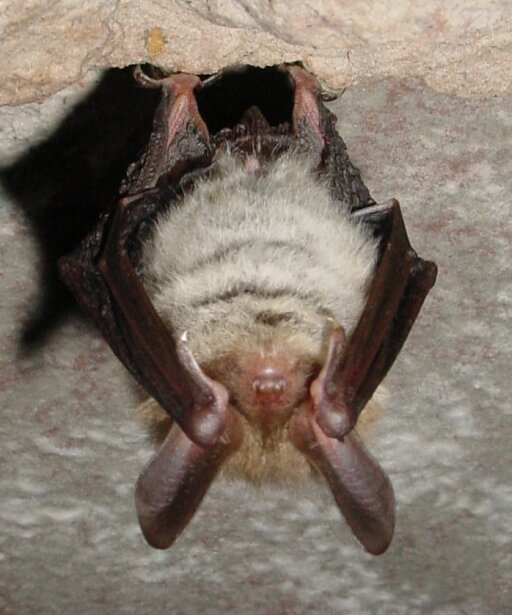
Bechstein's bat

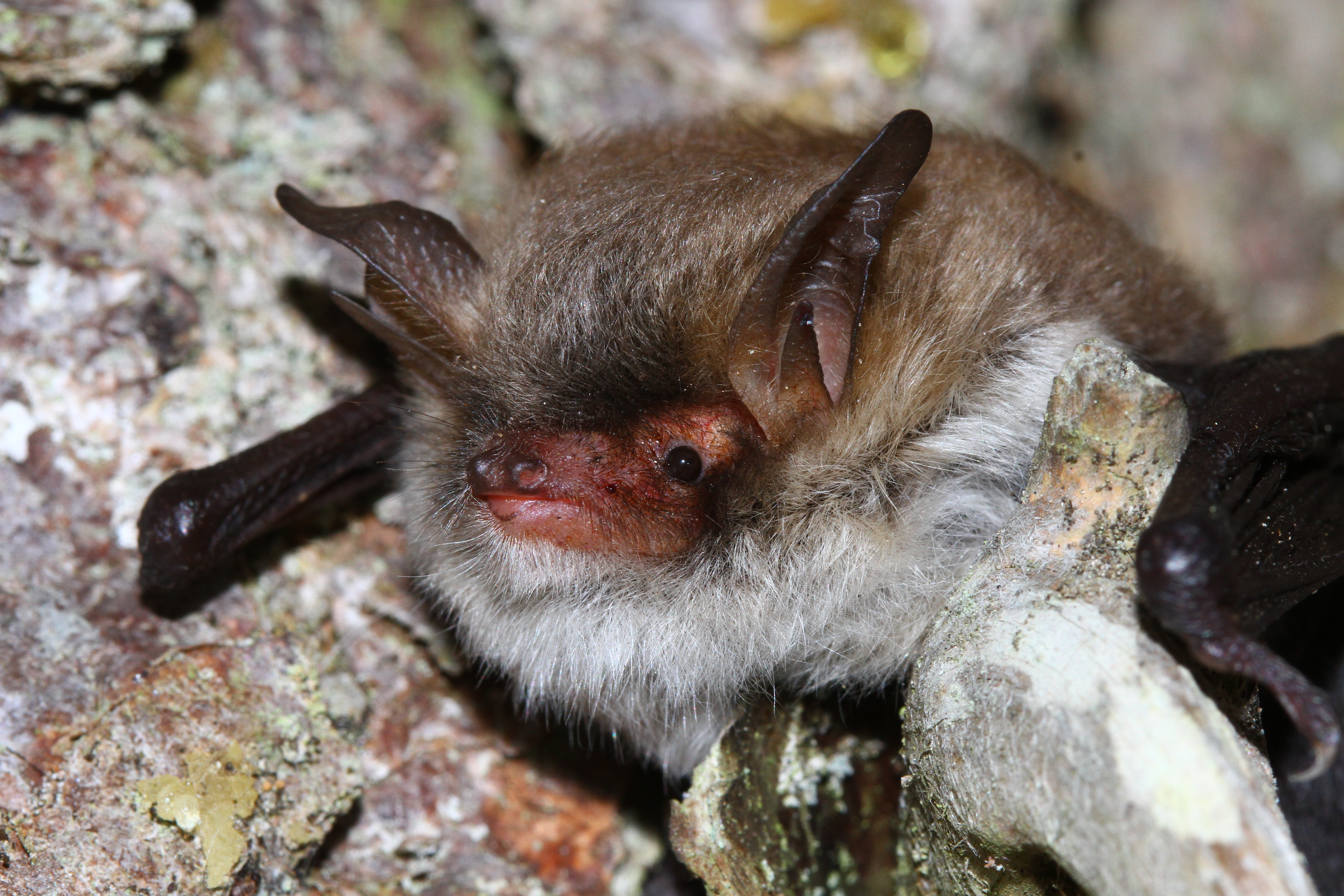
Cryptic myotis

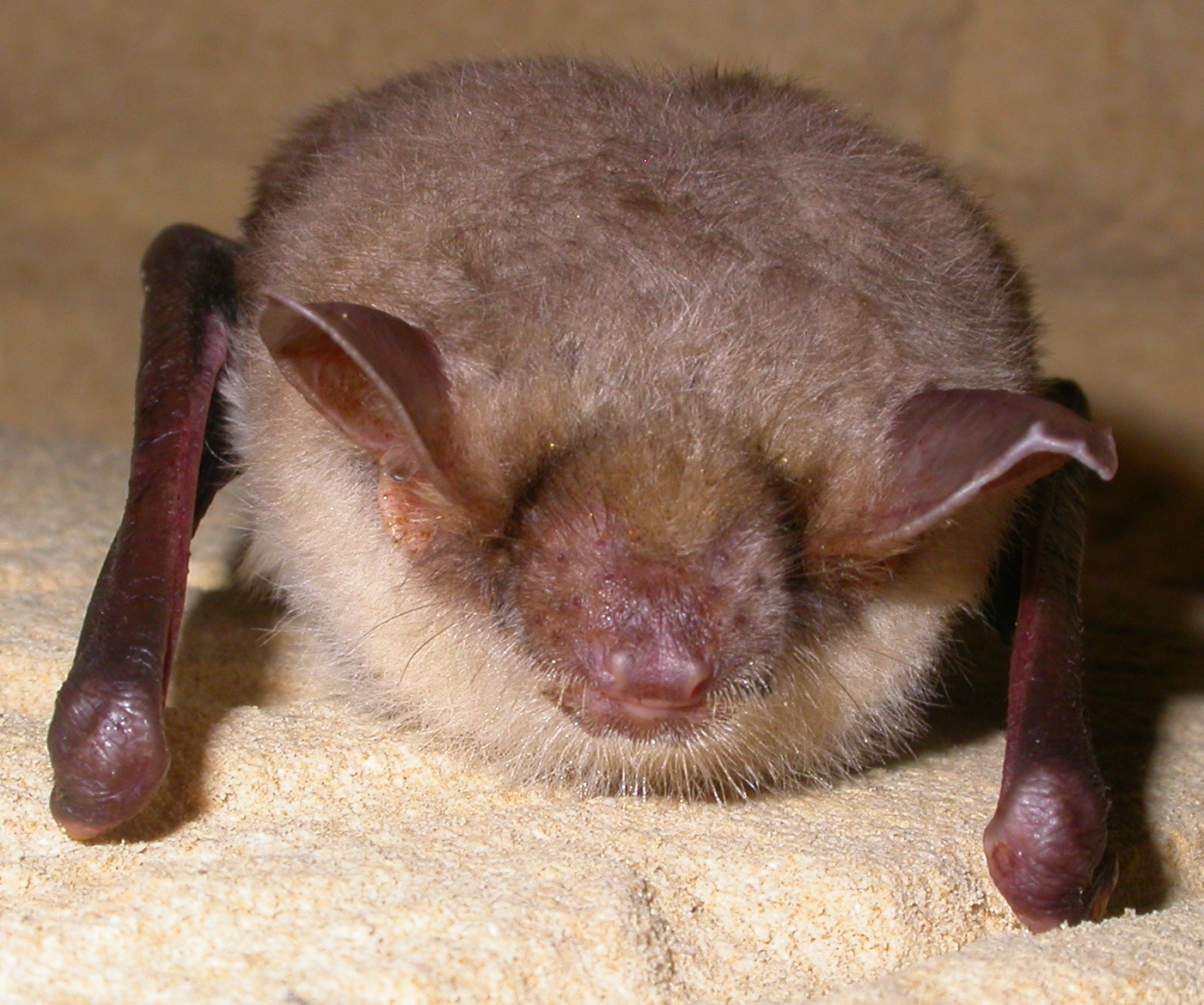
Greater mouse-eared bat

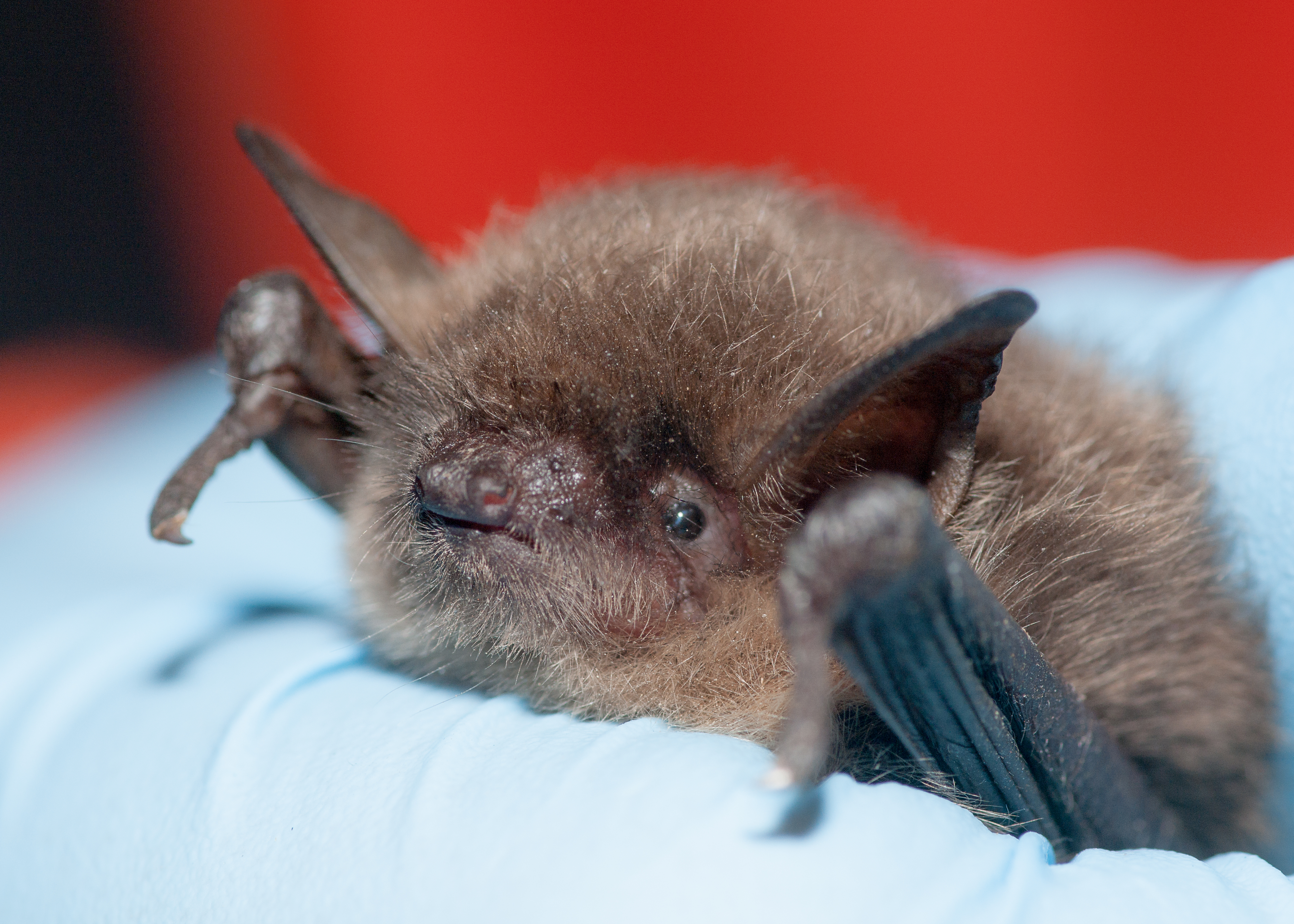
Yuma myotis

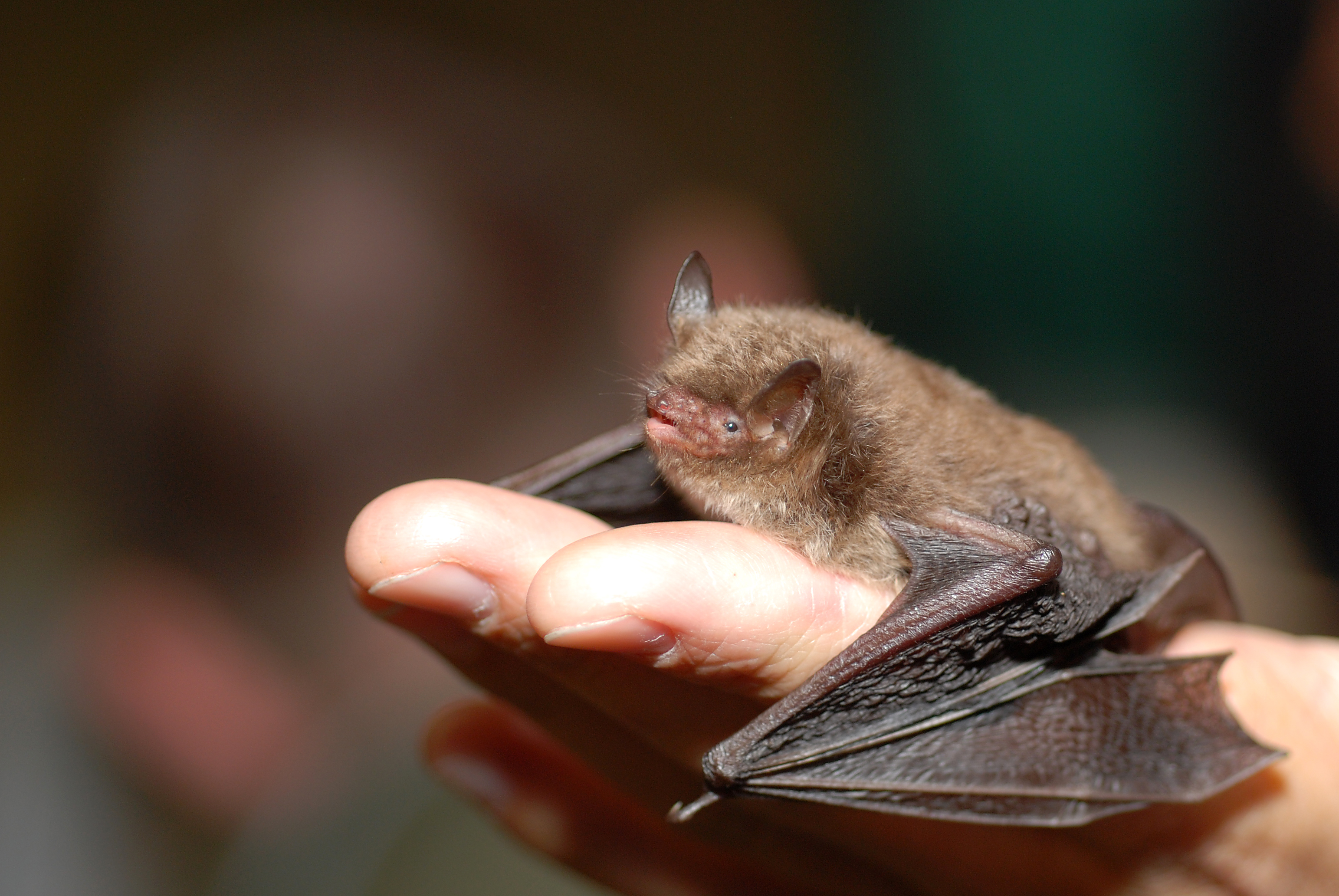
Daubenton's bat

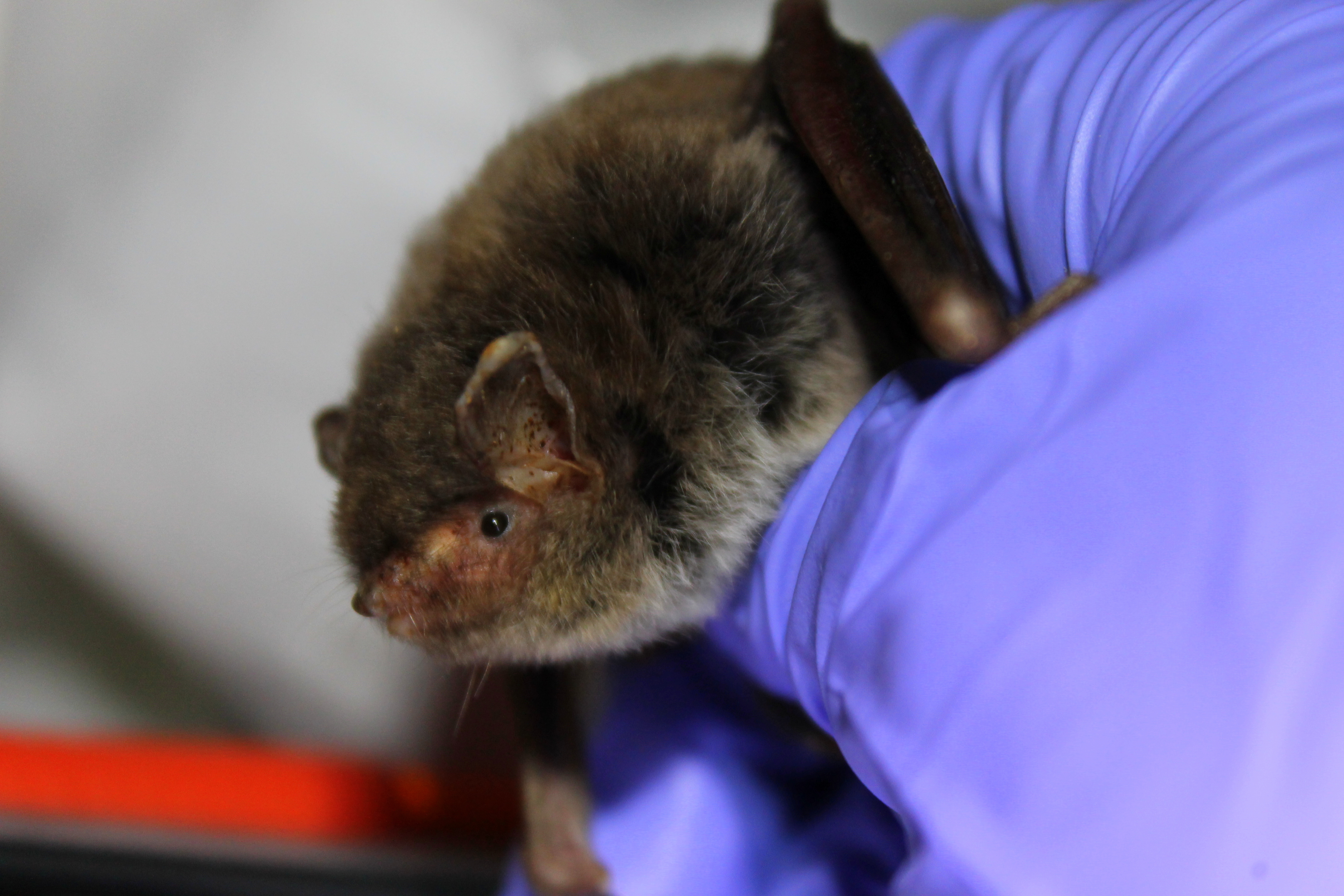
Southeastern myotis

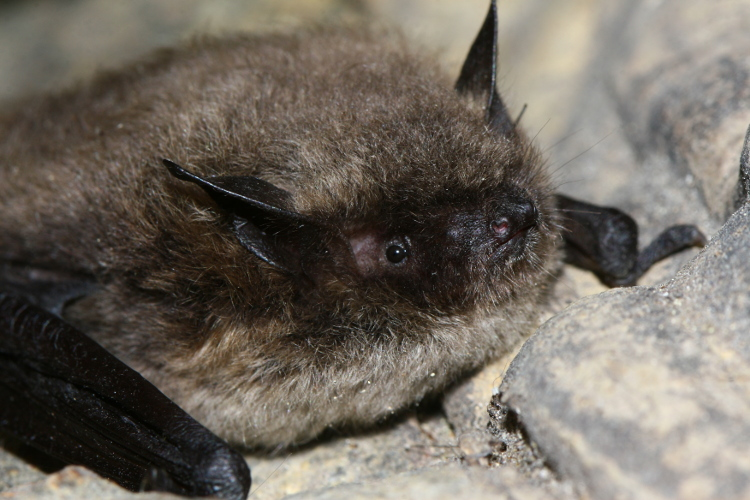
Brandt's bat

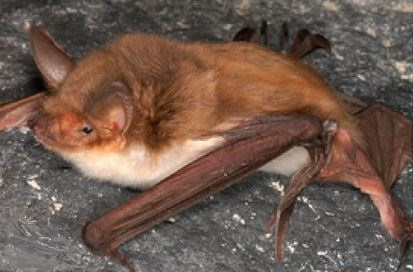
Fish-eating bat

Myotis is a highly species-rich genus, and the classification of many species remains unsettled. The taxonomy below is based on that of the ITIS in 2021. Some differences in taxonomy from the 2005 third edition of Mammal Species of the World are indicated in footnotes.

- Subgenus Chrysopteron:
  - Myotis anjouanensis (Dorst, 1960) - Anjouan myotis
  - Myotis bartelsii (Jentink, 1910) - Bartels's myotis
  - Myotis bocagii (Peters, 1870) - rufous mouse-eared bat
  - Myotis dieteri (Happold, 2005) - Kock's mouse-eared bat
  - Myotis emarginatus (E. Geoffroy, 1806) - Geoffroy's bat
  - Myotis formosus (Hodgson, 1835) - Hodgson's bat, copper-winged bat
  - Myotis goudotii (A. Smith, 1834) - Malagasy mouse-eared bat
  - Myotis hermani Thomas, 1923 - Herman's myotis
  - Myotis morrisi Hill, 1971 - Morris's bat
  - Myotis nimbaensis (Simmons et al., 2021) - Nimba mountain bat
  - Myotis rufoniger (Tomes, 1858) (Note: Split from M. formosus (Csorba et al., 2014).) - reddish-black myotis
  - Myotis rufopictus (Waterhouse, 1845) (Note: Split from M. formosus (Csorba et al., 2014).) - orange-fingered myotis
  - Myotis scotti Thomas, 1927 - Scott's mouse-eared bat
  - Myotis tricolor (Temminck, 1832) - Cape hairy bat, little brown bat, Temminck's mouse-eared bat, Cape myotis, tricoloured mouse-eared bat, Cape hairy myotis, Temminck's hairy bat, three-coloured bat
  - Myotis weberi (Jentink, 1890) (Note: Split from M. formosus (Csorba et al., 2014).) - Weber's myotis
  - Myotis welwitschii (Gray, 1866) - Welwitsch's bat, Welwitsch's mouse-eared bat, Welwitsch's myotis
- Subgenus Myotis:
  - Myotis adversus (Horsfield, 1824) - large-footed bat, large-footed mouse-eared bat, large-footed myotis
  - Myotis aelleni (Baud, 1979) - southern myotis (disputed species)
  - Myotis alcathoe (von Helversen and Heller, 2001) - Alcathoe bat
  - Myotis altarium (Thomas, 1911) - Szechwan myotis
  - Myotis alticraniatus Osgood, 1932 - Indochinese whiskered myotis
  - Myotis ancricola Kruskop, Borisenko, Dudorova, & Artyushin, 2018 - valley myotis
  - Myotis annamiticus (Kruskop and Tsytsulina, 2001) - Annamit myotis
  - Myotis annatessae Kruskop & Borisenko, 2013 - Anna Tess's myotis
  - Myotis annectans (Dobson, 1871) - hairy-faced bat
  - Myotis ater (Peters, 1866) - Peters's myotis, small black myotis
  - Myotis badius Tiunov, Kruskop, & Feng Jiang, 2011 - chestnut myotis
  - Myotis bechsteinii (Kuhl, 1817) - Bechstein's bat
  - Myotis blythii (Tomes, 1857) - lesser mouse-eared bat
  - Myotis bombinus (Thomas, 1906) - Far Eastern myotis, bombinus bat
  - Myotis borneoensis Hill & Francis, 1984 (Note: Split from M. montivagus (Görföl et al., 2013).) - Bornean whiskered myotis
  - Myotis browni E. H. Taylor, 1934 - Brown's whiskered myotis
  - Myotis bucharensis (Kuzyakin, 1950) - Bocharic myotis, Bokhara whiskered bat
  - Myotis capaccinii (Bonaparte, 1837) - long-fingered bat
  - Myotis chinensis (Tomes, 1857) - large myotis
  - Myotis crypticus Ruedi, Ibáñez, Salicini, Juste & Puechmaille, 2019 - cryptic myotis
  - Myotis csorbai (Topál, 1997) - Csorba's mouse-eared bat
  - Myotis dasycneme (Boie, 1825) - pond bat
  - Myotis daubentonii (Kuhl, 1817) - Daubenton's bat
  - Myotis davidii (Peters, 1869) - David's myotis
  - Myotis escalerai Cabrera, 1904 (Note: Split from M. nattereri (Ibáñez et al., 2006).) - Escalera's bat
  - Myotis federatus Thomas, 1916 (Note: Split from M. montivagus (Görföl et al., 2013).) - Malaysian whiskered myotis
  - Myotis fimbriatus (Peters, 1871) - fringed long-footed myotis
  - Myotis frater G.M. Allen, 1923 - fraternal myotis
  - Myotis gomantongensis Francis and Hill, 1998 - Gomantong myotis
  - Myotis hajastanicus Argyropulo, 1939 - Armenian whiskered bat, Hajastan myotis, Armenian myotis (disputed species)
  - Myotis hasseltii (Temminck, 1840) - lesser large-footed bat
  - Myotis horsfieldii (Temminck, 1840) - Horsfield's bat
  - Myotis hoveli Harrison, 1964 - Hovel's myotis
  - Myotis hyrcanicus Benda et al., 2012 - Hyrcanian myotis
  - Myotis ikonnikovi Ognev, 1912 - Ikonnikov's bat
  - Myotis indochinensis Son et al., 2013 - Indochinese myotis
  - Myotis insularum (Dobson, 1878) - insular myotis
  - Myotis laniger Peters, 1871 - Chinese water myotis
  - Myotis longicaudatus Ognev, 1927 (Note: Split from M. frater (Ruedi et al., 2015).) - long-tailed myotis
  - Myotis longipes (Dobson, 1873) - Kashmir cave bat
  - Myotis macrodactylus (Temminck, 1840) - eastern long-fingered bat, big-footed myotis
  - Myotis macropus (Gould, 1854) - southern myotis, large-footed myotis
  - Myotis macrotarsus (Waterhouse, 1845) - pallid large-footed myotis, Philippine large-footed myotis
  - Myotis melanorhinus Merriam, 1890 - dark-nosed small-footed myotis (disputed species)
  - Myotis moluccarum (Thomas, 1915) - Maluku myotis, Arafura large-footed bat
  - Myotis montivagus (Dobson, 1874) - Burmese whiskered bat
  - Myotis muricola (Gray, 1846) - wall-roosting mouse-eared bat, Nepalese whiskered myotis
  - Myotis myotis (Borkhausen, 1797) - greater mouse-eared bat
  - Myotis mystacinus (Kuhl, 1817) - whiskered bat
  - Myotis nattereri (Kuhl, 1817) - Natterer's bat
  - Myotis nipalensis Dobson, 1871 - Nepal myotis
  - Myotis pequinius Thomas, 1908 - Beijing mouse-eared bat, Peking myotis
  - Myotis petax Hollister, 1912 (Note: Split from M. daubentonii (Matveev et al., 2005). Includes M. abei (Tsytsulina, 2004, as daubentonii).) - eastern water bat, Sakhalin bat
  - Myotis peytoni Wroughton & Ryley, 1913 (Note: Split from M. montivagus (Görföl et al., 2013).) - Peyton's myotis
  - Myotis phanluongi Borisenko, Kruskop and Ivanova, 2008 - Phan Luong's myotis (Note: A new species (Borisenko et al., 2008).)
  - Myotis pilosus Peters, 1869 - Rickett's big-footed bat
  - Myotis pruinosus Yoshiyuki, 1971 - frosted myotis
  - Myotis punicus Felten, Spitzenberger and Storch, 1977 - Felten's myotis
  - Myotis ridleyi Thomas, 1898 - Ridley's bat
  - Myotis rosseti (Oey, 1951) - thick-thumbed myotis
  - Myotis schaubi Kormos, 1934 - Schaub's myotis
  - Myotis secundus Ruedi, Csorba, Lin, & Chou, 2015 - long-toed myotis
  - Myotis sicarius Thomas, 1915 - Mandelli's mouse-eared bat
  - Myotis siligorensis (Horsfield, 1855) - Himalayan whiskered bat
  - Myotis soror Ruedi, Csorba, Lin, & Chou, 2015 - reddish myotis
  - Myotis sowerbyi Howell, 1926 - Sowerby's whiskered myotis
  - Myotis stalkeri Thomas, 1910 - Kei myotis
  - Myotis tschuliensis Kuzyakin, 1935 - Tschuli myotis
  - Myotis yanbarensis Maeda and Matsumara, 1998 - Yanbaru whiskered bat
  - Myotis zenatius Ibáñez, Juste, Salicini, Puechmaille & Ruedi, 2019 - Zenati myotis
- Subgenus Pizonyx:
  - Myotis albescens (E. Geoffroy, 1806) - silver-tipped myotis
  - Myotis armiensis Carrión-Bonilla & Cook, 2020 - Armién's myotis
  - Myotis atacamensis (Lataste, 1892) - Atacama myotis
  - Myotis attenboroughi Moratelli et al., 2017 (Note: Split from M. nigricans (Moratelli et al., 2017).) - Sir David Attenborough's myotis
  - Myotis auriculus (Baker and Stains, 1955) - southwestern myotis
  - Myotis austroriparius (Rhoads, 1897) - southeastern myotis
  - Myotis bakeri Moratelli, Novaes, Bonilla, & D. E. Wilson, 2019 - Baker's myotis
  - Myotis brandtii (Eversmann, 1845) - Brandt's bat
  - Myotis californicus (Audubon and Bachman, 1842) - California myotis
  - Myotis caucensis Allen, 1914 - Colombian black myotis
  - Myotis chiloensis (Waterhouse, 1840) - Chilean myotis
  - Myotis ciliolabrum (Merriam, 1886) - western small-footed bat, western small-footed myotis
  - Myotis clydejonesi Moratelli, D. E. Wilson, A. L. Gardner, Fisher, & Gutierrez, 2016 - Clyde Jones's myotis
  - Myotis cobanensis (Goodwin, 1955) - Guatemalan myotis
  - Myotis diminutus Moratelli & Wilson, 2011 - diminutive myotis
  - Myotis dinellii Thomas, 1902 (Note: Split from M. levis (Barquez et al., 2006).) - Dinelli's myotis
  - Myotis dominicensis Miller, 1902 - Dominican myotis
  - Myotis elegans Hall, 1962 - elegant myotis
  - Myotis evotis (H. Allen, 1864) - long-eared myotis
  - Myotis findleyi Bogan, 1978 - Findley's myotis
  - Myotis fortidens Miller and Allen, 1928 - cinnamon myotis
  - Myotis grisescens A.H. Howell, 1909 - gray bat
  - Myotis handleyi Moratelli, A. L. Gardner, J. A. Oliveira, & D. E. Wilson, 2013 - Handley's myotis
  - Myotis izecksohni Moratelli, Peracchi, Dias & de Oliveira, 2011 - Izecksohn's myotis
  - Myotis keaysi J.A. Allen, 1914 - hairy-legged myotis
  - Myotis keenii (Merriam, 1895) - Keen's myotis
  - Myotis larensis LaVal, 1973 - Lara myotis
  - Myotis lavali Moratelli, Peracchi, Dias, & Oliveira, 2011 - LaVal's Myotis
  - Myotis leibii (Audubon and Bachman, 1842) - eastern small-footed bat
  - Myotis levis (I. Geoffroy, 1824) - yellowish myotis
  - Myotis lucifugus (Le Conte, 1831) - little brown bat, little brown myotis
  - Myotis martiniquensis LaVal, 1973 - Schwartz's myotis
  - Myotis midastactus Moratelli & Wilson, 2014 - golden myotis (Note: Split from M. simus (Moratelli & Wilson, 2014).)
  - Myotis nesopolus Miller, 1900 - Curacao myotis
  - Myotis nigricans (Schinz, 1821) - black myotis
  - Myotis nyctor LaVal & Schwartz, 1974 - Barbados myotis (Note: Split from M. martiniquensis (Larsen et al., 2012).)
  - Myotis occultus Hollister, 1909 - Arizona myotis
  - Myotis oxyotus (Peters, 1867) - montane myotis
  - Myotis peninsularis Miller, 1898 - peninsular myotis
  - Myotis pilosatibialis LaVal, 1973 - northern hairy-legged myotis
  - Myotis planiceps Baker, 1955 - flat-headed myotis
  - Myotis riparius Handley, 1960 - riparian myotis
  - Myotis ruber (E. Geoffroy, 1806) - red myotis
  - Myotis septentrionalis (Trouessart, 1897) - northern long-eared bat, northern myotis
  - Myotis sibiricus (Kastschenko, 1905) - Siberian bat or Siberian whiskered myotis (Note: Split from M. brandtii (Kruskop, Borisenko, Ivanova, Lim & Eger, 2012).)
  - Myotis simus Thomas, 1901 - velvety myotis
  - Myotis sodalis Miller and Allen, 1928 - Indiana bat
  - Myotis thysanodes Miller, 1897 - fringed myotis
  - Myotis velifer (J.A. Allen, 1890) - cave myotis
  - Myotis vivesi Menegaux, 1901 - fish-eating bat, fish-eating myotis
  - Myotis volans (H. Allen, 1866) - long-legged myotis
  - Myotis yumanensis (H. Allen, 1864) - Yuma myotis
- Unclassified & dubious species:
  - Myotis australis (Dobson, 1878) - Australian myotis (disputed species)
  - Myotis oreias (Temminck, 1840) - Singapore whiskered bat

== See also ==
- Bat adenovirus TJM

== Literature cited ==
- Borisenko, A.V., Kruskop, S.V. and Ivanova, N.V. 2008. A new mouse-eared bat (Mammalia: Chiroptera: Vespertilionidae) from Vietnam. Russian Journal of Theriology 7(2):57–69.
- Han, N., Zhang, J., Reardon, T., Lin, L., Zhang, J. and Zhang, S. 2010. Revalidation of Myotis taiwanensis Ärnbäck-Christie-Linde 1908 and its molecular relationship with M. adversus (Horsfield 1824) (Vespertilionidae, Chiroptera) (subscription required). Acta Chiropterologica 12(2):449–456.*Happold, M. 2005. A new species of Myotis (Chiroptera: Vespertilionidae) from central Africa. Acta Chiropterologica 7(1):9–21.
- Ibáñez, C., García-Mudarra, J.L., Ruedi, M., Stadelmann, B. and Juste, J. 2006. The Iberian contribution to cryptic diversity in European bats. Acta Chiropterologica 8(2):277–297.
- Jiang, T., Sun, K., Chou, C., Zhang, Z. and Feng, J. 2010. First record of Myotis flavus (Chiroptera: Vespertilionidae) from mainland China and a reassessment of its taxonomic status. Zootaxa 2414:41–51.
- Lack, J.B., Roehrs, Z.P., Stanley, C.E., Ruedi, M. and Van Den Bussche, R.A. 2010. Molecular phylogenetics of Myotis indicate familial-level divergence for the genus Cistugo (Chiroptera) (subscription required). Journal of Mammalogy 91(4):976–992.
- Matveev, V.A., Kruskop, S.V. and Kramerov, D.A. 2005. Revalidation of Myotis petax Hollister, 1912 and its new status in connection with M. daubentonii (Kuhl, 1817) (Vespertilionidae, Chiroptera). Acta Chiropterologica 7(1):23–37.
- Mayer, F., Dietz, C. and Kiefer, A. 2007. Molecular species identification boosts bat diversity. Frontiers in Zoology 4(1):239–255.
- Moratelli, R.; Wilson, D. E.; Novaes, R. L. M.; Helgen, K. M.; Gutiérrez, E. E. (2017-06-07). "Caribbean Myotis (Chiroptera, Vespertilionidae), with description of a new species from Trinidad and Tobago". Journal of Mammalogy. 98 (4): 994–1008. doi:10.1093/jmammal/gyx062.
- Roehrs, Z.P., Lack, J.B. and Van Den Bussche, R.A. 2010. Tribal phylogenetic relationships within Vespertilioninae (Chiroptera: Vespertilionidae) based on mitochondrial and nuclear sequence data (subscription required). Journal of Mammalogy 91(5):1073–1092.
- Simmons, N.B. 2005. Order Chiroptera. Pp. 312–529 in Wilson, D.E. and Reeder, D.M. (eds.). Mammal Species of the World: A Taxonomic and Geographic Reference. 3rd ed. Baltimore: The Johns Hopkins University Press, 2 vols., 2142 pp. ISBN 978-0-8018-8221-0
- Stadelmann, B., Lin, L.-K., Kunz, T.H. and Ruedi, M. 2007. Molecular phylogeny of New World Myotis (Chiroptera, Vespertilionidae) inferred from mitochondrial and nuclear DNA genes (subscription required). Molecular Phylogenetics and Evolution 43(1):32–48.
- Tsytsulina, K. 2004. On the taxonomical status of Myotis abei Yoshikura, 1944 (Chiroptera, Vespertilionidae). Zoological Science 21:963–966.
- Simmons, Nancy B.; Flanders, J.; Bakwo Fils, E. M.; Parker, Guy; Suter, Jamison D.; Bamba, Seinan; Keita, Mamady Kobele; Morales, Ariadna E.; Frick, Winifred F. 2021. A new dichromatic species of Myotis (Chiroptera: Vespertilionidae) from the Nimba Mountains, Guinea (American Museum novitates, no. 3963) American Museum Novitates. ISSN 0003-0082.
