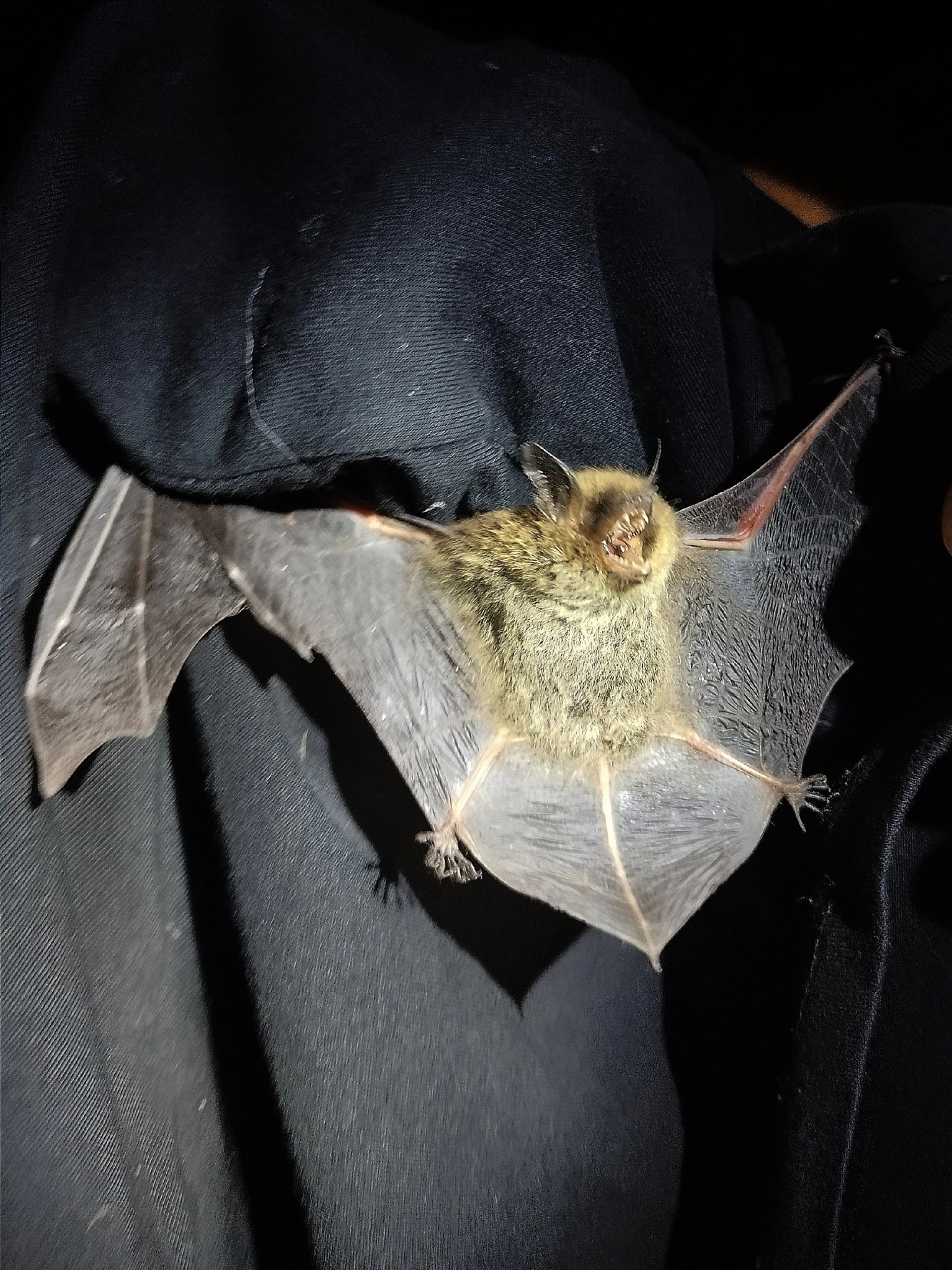

Conservation status
- Least Concern (IUCN 3.1)

Scientific classification
- Kingdom: Animalia
- Phylum: Chordata
- Class: Mammalia
- Infraclass: Placentalia
- Order: Chiroptera
- Family: Vespertilionidae
- Genus: Myotis
- Species: M. sibiricus

Binomial name
- Myotis sibiricus (Kastschenko, 1905)
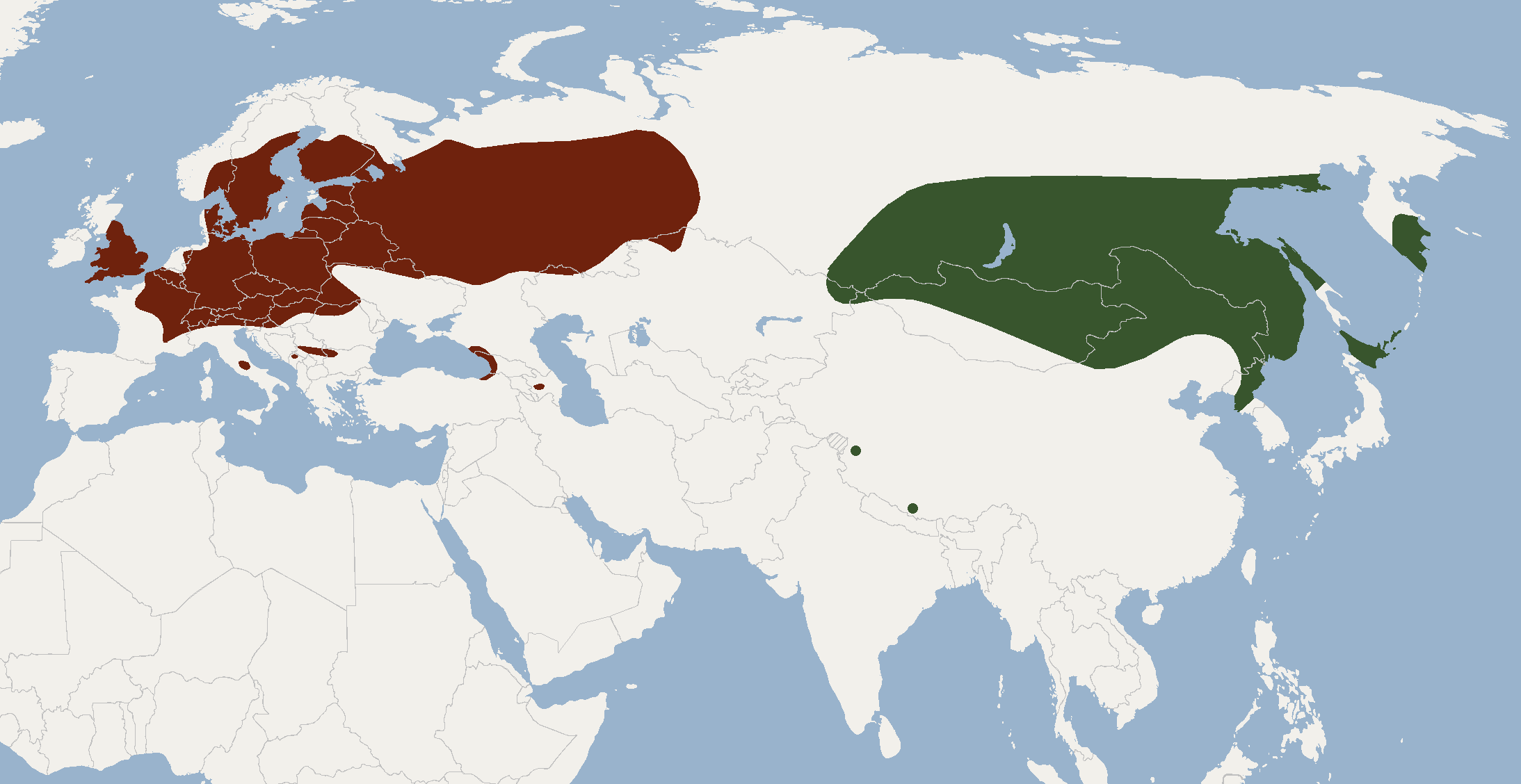
- Myotis sibiricus range in green

Synonyms
- Myotis brandtii gracilis Ognev, 1927; Myotis gracilis Ognev, 1927

= Siberian bat =

Species of vesper bat

The Siberian bat or Siberian whiskered myotis (Myotis sibiricus) is a species of vesper bat in the family Vespertilionidae. It is found throughout northeastern Asia, primarily in Siberia. It is known for its high life expectancy relative to its body size, approximately twice that of humans, and holds the record for the oldest bat; in 2005, one individual was discovered in a cave in Siberia that had been banded in 1964, making the bat at least 41 years old.

== Taxonomy ==
It was previously classified within the Brandt's bat (M. brandtii), but more recent phylogenetic studies have found deep genetic divergence between both taxa, indicating that both are distinct species from one another, and they have thus been split by authorities including the American Society of Mammalogists, the IUCN Red List, and ITIS.

== Distribution and habitat ==
It is found throughout much of the Palearctic east of the Ob River, from eastern Kazakhstan east throughout southern Siberia to the Kamchatka Peninsula, and south to northern China, northern Mongolia, North Korea, and northern South Korea. It is also known from Sakhalin & the Kuril Islands in Russia, and Hokkaido in Japan. It inhabits both lowland and mountain forests as well as forest-steppe ecosystems. During the summer it takes shelter in tree hollows, caves, and even buildings, but it winters exclusively in caves.

== Description ==
It is a small bat, with the length of its head and body only 39–51 mm (1.5–2.0 in). Its forearm is 33–39 mm (1.3–1.5 in) long; its tail is 32–44 mm (1.3–1.7 in) long; its hind feet are 7–9 mm (0.28–0.35 in) long; its ears are 12–17 mm (0.47–0.67 in). It has long fur relative to its body size. The fur on its back is pale brown with a golden sheen, while the fur on its ventral side is paler gray, sometimes with a yellowish tinge. Its tragus is narrow and pointed.

== Biology ==
Populations in Siberia have exceptionally long hibernation periods, beginning in late September and continuing through mid-June of the following year. During the winter, Siberian bats will roost in mine shafts, caves, tunnels, and cellars. Some – but not all – populations hibernate in the winter, while others are partially migratory. They are insectivorous, foraging at low altitudes through quick, maneuverable flight.

=== Reproduction ===
During the summer, females will form maternity colonies to raise their young. The litter size is one pup, though occasionally two are born. Pups are born in early summer, with pups becoming volant around one month of age. Maternity colonies are frequently in manmade structures.

=== Longevity ===
In the early 1960s, 1,544 Siberian bats were banded in Siberia. Of these individuals, at least 67 lived longer than 20 years, all of them male. In 2001, two individuals were documented 38 years after capture, making them the longest-lived individuals of this species ever recorded at the time. However, three years later, one of these individuals was documented again. This meant that the longest-lived individual of this species was at least 41 years old. In mammals, larger animals tend to have longer lifespans than smaller ones; the Siberian bat is the most extreme outlier to this pattern, with lifespans exceeding 40 years in the wild while only weighing 4–8 g (0.14–0.28 oz). Compared with other animals its size, it lives 9.8 times longer than expected, which is the greatest value of any mammal with a known lifespan.

== Status ==
This species is thought to have a declining population due to forest degradation and fragmentation, as well as the loss of roost sites in caves. The primary cause of forest loss is urban development, with deforestation and wildfires also playing a role in the decline. Disturbances by cavers are known to cause mortality in winter roosts. However, it has a wide population and is not thought to be declining at a rate that would qualify it for a more imperiled status, so it is classified as Least Concern.
