= Reddish tuco-tuco =

Conservation status
- Least Concern (IUCN 3.1)

Scientific classification
- Kingdom: Animalia
- Phylum: Chordata
- Class: Mammalia
- Infraclass: Placentalia
- Order: Rodentia
- Family: Ctenomyidae
- Genus: Ctenomys
- Species: C. frater

Binomial name
- Ctenomys frater Thomas, 1902

Subspecies
- C. f. barbarous Thomas, 1921; C. f. budini Thomas, 1913; C. f. frater Thomas, 1902; C. f. mordosus Thomas, 1926; C. f. sylvanus Thomas, 1919

Species of rodent

The reddish tuco-tuco (Ctenomys frater) is a species of rodent in the family Ctenomyidae. Five subspecies have been recognized, some formerly designated as separate species. It is found in Argentina and Bolivia at altitudes from 600 to 4,500 m (1,970 to 14,760 ft). This tuco-tuco is fossorial, like others in its genus. Its diet consists of underground tubers and roots. Its karyotype has 2n = 52 and FN = 78.

It lives in colonies in areas with suitably soft, dry soil. Both undisturbed and disturbed areas provide suitable habitat. Its conservation status is assessed as "Least Concern" by the IUCN.

== Taxonomic history ==
Budin's tuco-tuco (C. budini) was formerly considered a distinct species, endemic to southeast Jujuy Province in northwest Argentina, suspected to be threatened. The IUCN and ASM currently view it as a subspecies of C. frater. It was named after Emilio Budin, an Argentine specimen collector who worked with Oldfield Thomas.

The forest tuco-tuco (C. sylvanus) was formerly considered a distinct species, endemic to Salta and southeast Jujuy Provinces in northwest Argentina. The IUCN currently recognizes it as a subspecies of C. frater.
