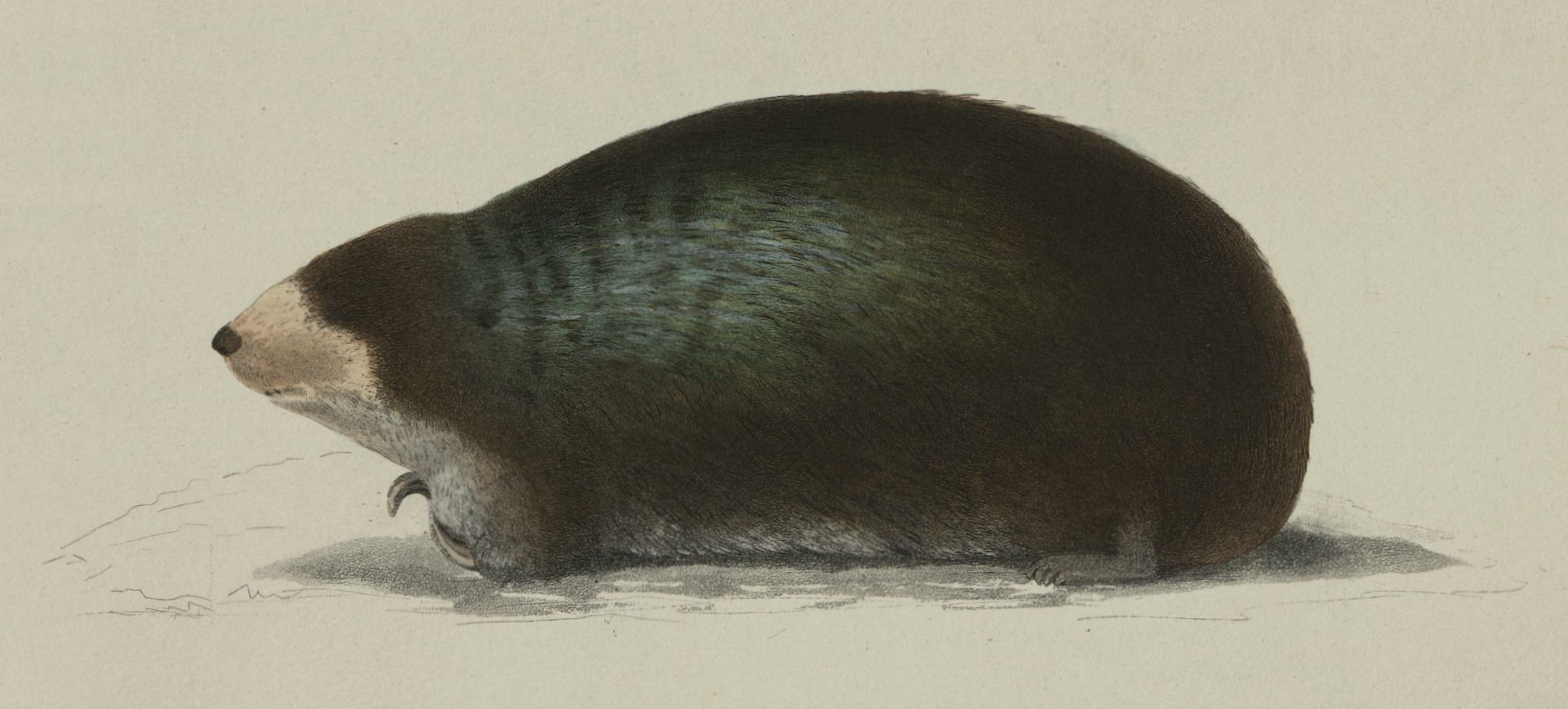

Conservation status
- Data Deficient (IUCN 3.1)

Scientific classification
- Kingdom: Animalia
- Phylum: Chordata
- Class: Mammalia
- Order: Afrosoricida
- Family: Chrysochloridae
- Genus: Huetia; Forcart, 1942
- Species: H. leucorhina

Binomial name
- Huetia leucorhina (Huet, 1885)

Subspecies
- Huetia leucorhina cahni; Huetia leucorhina leucorhina (including congicus and lulanus)
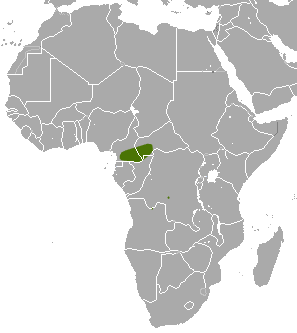
- Congo golden mole range

Synonyms
- Calcochloris leucorhinus (Huet, 1885) Chlorotalpa leucorhina (Huet, 1885) Chrysochloris leucorhinus (Huet, 1885) Calcochloris congicus Calcochloris lulanus Amblysomus leucorhinus

= Congo golden mole =

Species of mammal

The Congo golden mole (Huetia leucorhina) is a species of mammal in the family Chrysochloridae. It is found in Angola, Cameroon, Central African Republic, Republic of the Congo, and Democratic Republic of the Congo. Its natural habitats are subtropical or tropical forest, arable land, pastureland, plantations, and rural gardens.

Golden moles have been found to have ossicles that are larger than other similar organism. These ossicles are believed to allow to sense seismic vibrations, allowing them to be able to sense where they are and compensating for their bad eyesight.
