= Tonkin weasel =

Conservation status
- Data Deficient (IUCN 3.1)

Scientific classification
- Kingdom: Animalia
- Phylum: Chordata
- Class: Mammalia
- Order: Carnivora
- Suborder: Caniformia
- Family: Mustelidae
- Genus: Mustela
- Species: M. tonkinensis

Binomial name
- Mustela tonkinensis (Björkegren, 1941)

Species of carnivore

The Tonkin weasel or Vietnamese mountain weasel (Mustela tonkinensis) is a species of weasel from Vietnam. The species was described by Swedish biologist Berkil Björkegren in 1941, from a single specimen obtained in Vietnam in 1939. It was classified as a subspecies of common weasel until 2007, when it was re-classified as a separate species. It is not classified in the IUCN Red List and is listed as data deficient.

== Taxonomy ==
Tonkin weasel is a species in the weasel family of Mustelidae. The species was described by Swedish biologist Berkil Björkegren in 1941, from a specimen obtained in Vietnam in January 1939. While describing the species, Björkegren described the species as being closely related to the common weasel. It was classified as a subspecies of the same subsequently by various zoologists. It was distinguished as a separate species on the basis of skull differences in 2007.

== Distribution and habitat ==
Tonkin weasel is found only in Vietnam. It supposedly inhabits the low altitude ranges of the Hoang Lien mountains in Vietnam. As of 2015, it is not classified in the IUCN Red List and is listed as data deficient.

== Morphology and behaviour ==
Tonkins' weasel is a medium-sized weasel with a body length of up to 200–243 mm (7.9–9.6 in), and tail length of 90–92 mm (3.5–3.6 in). It has a longer tail compared to the common weasel. The body is covered with brown colored fur, with the under parts predominantly white in colour, and a clear demarcation line between the two. It has a large skull measruing about 36.2 mm (1.43 in) at the base. Tonkin's weasel is not thought to be a better climber, and mainly preys on insects and small rodents on the ground.
