= Guatemalan myotis =

Conservation status
- Data Deficient (IUCN 3.1)

Scientific classification
- Kingdom: Animalia
- Phylum: Chordata
- Class: Mammalia
- Order: Chiroptera
- Family: Vespertilionidae
- Genus: Myotis
- Species: M. cobanensis

Binomial name
- Myotis cobanensis Goodwin, 1955
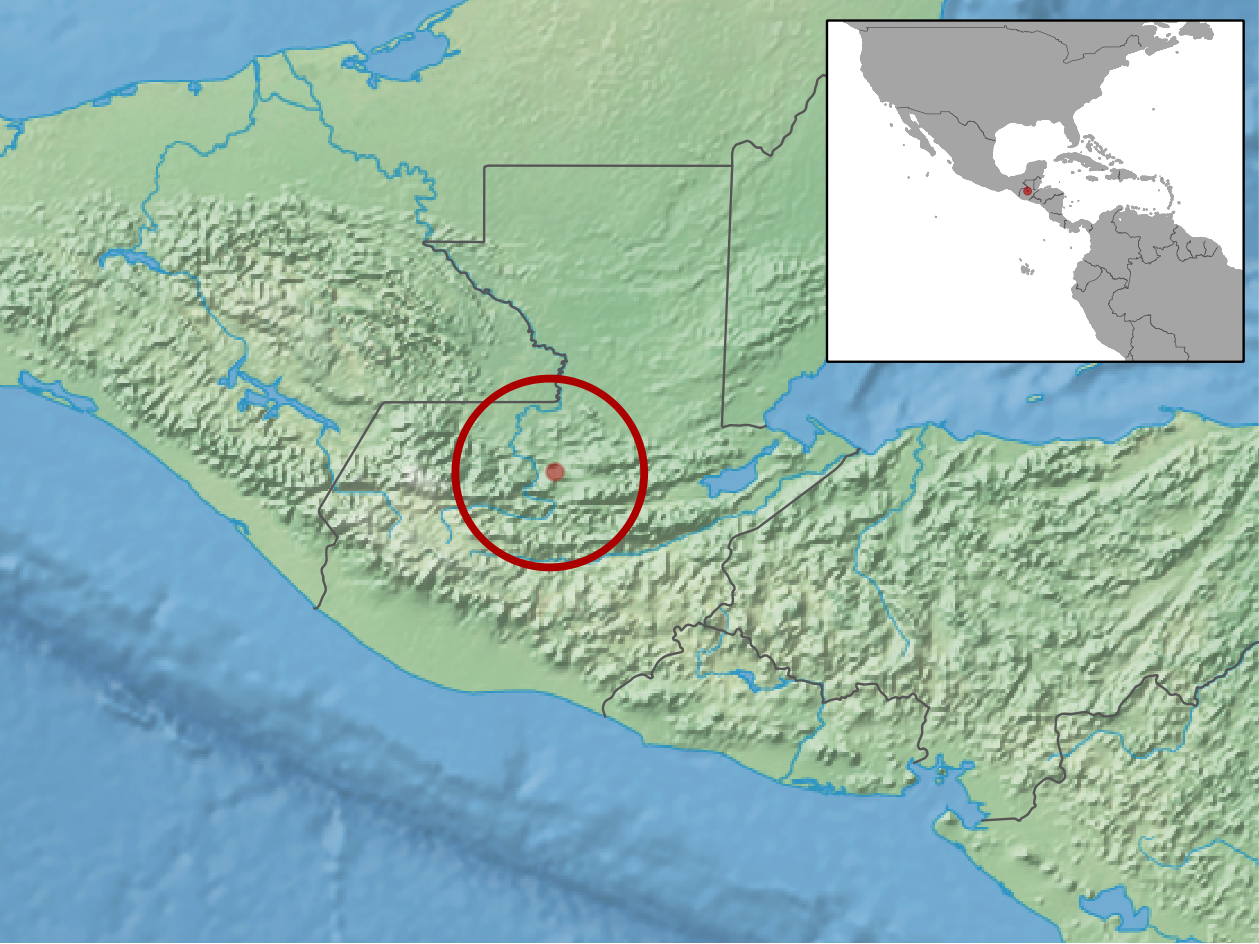

Species of bat

The Guatemalan myotis (Myotis cobanensis) is a species of vesper bat. It is found only in Guatemala.
