= Herman's myotis =

Conservation status
- Data Deficient (IUCN 3.1)

Scientific classification
- Kingdom: Animalia
- Phylum: Chordata
- Class: Mammalia
- Order: Chiroptera
- Family: Vespertilionidae
- Genus: Myotis
- Species: M. hermani

Binomial name
- Myotis hermani Thomas, 1923
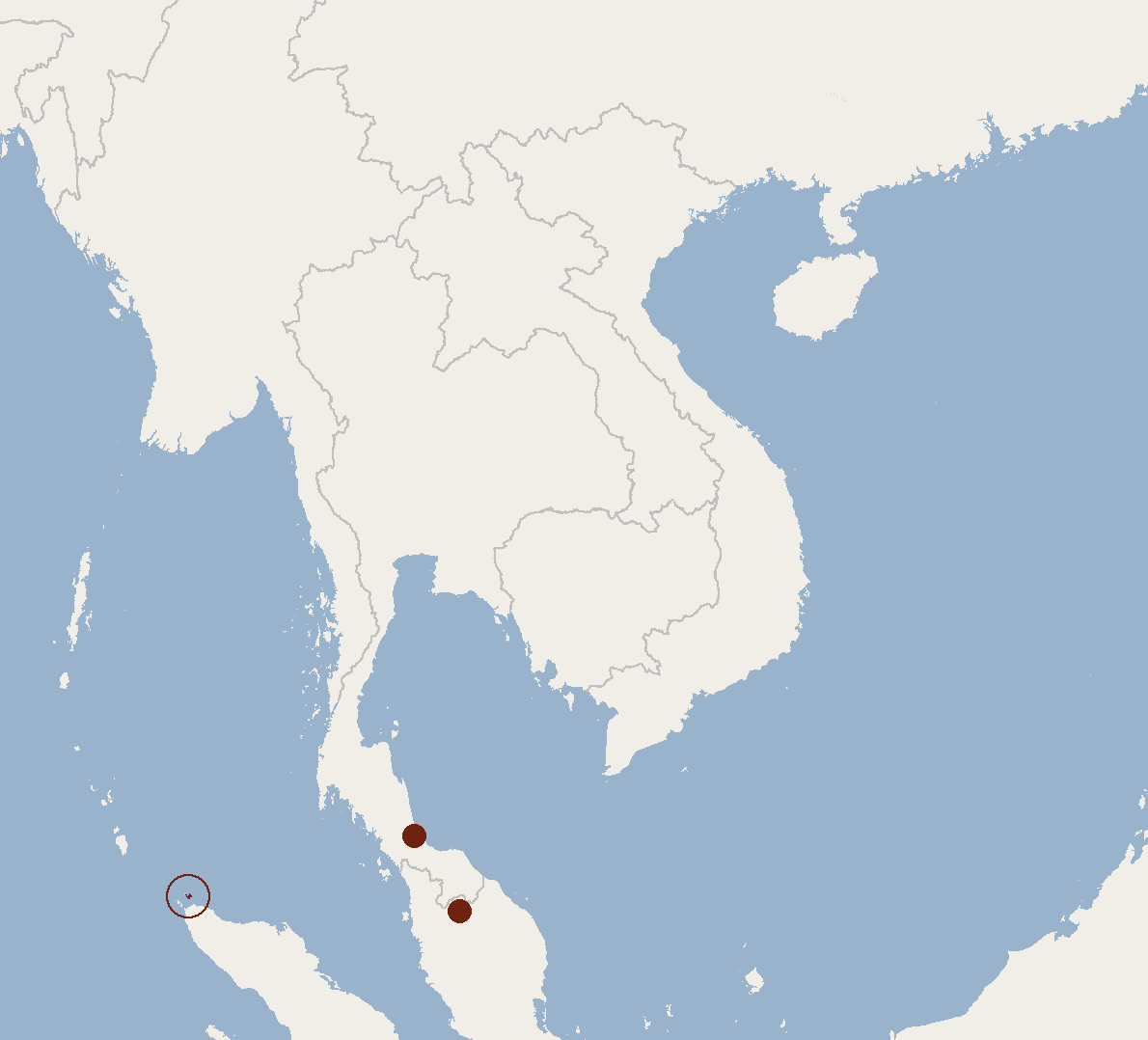

Species of bat

Herman's myotis (Myotis hermani) is a species of vesper bat. It is found only in Indonesia.
