= Kock's mouse-eared bat =

Conservation status
- Data Deficient (IUCN 3.1)

Scientific classification
- Kingdom: Animalia
- Phylum: Chordata
- Class: Mammalia
- Order: Chiroptera
- Family: Vespertilionidae
- Genus: Myotis
- Species: M. dieteri

Binomial name
- Myotis dieteri Happold, 2005

Species of bat

Kock's mouse-eared bat (Myotis dieteri) is a species of mouse-eared bat found in the Republic of the Congo.

Kock's mouse-eared bat was described as a new species in 2005 by Meredith Happold. The holotype had been collected in a limestone cave by Jean-Paul Adam some time between 1961–1968. The eponym for the species name dieteri is German mammalogist Dieter Kock.
