= Singapore whiskered bat =

Conservation status
- Data Deficient (IUCN 3.1)

Scientific classification
- Kingdom: Animalia
- Phylum: Chordata
- Class: Mammalia
- Order: Chiroptera
- Family: Vespertilionidae
- Genus: Vespertilio
- Species: V. oreias

Binomial name
- Vespertilio oreias (Temminck, 1840)
- Distribution according to the IUCN Redlist

Synonyms
- Myotis oreias Tate 1941

Species of bat

The Singapore whiskered bat (Vespertilio oreias) is or was a possible species of vesper bat endemic to Singapore. No specimens have been found since its original scientific description in 1840 by Dutch zoologist Coenraad Temminck.

== Taxonomy ==
There is some uncertainty regarding its genus classification as either Vespertilio (Temminck 1840), Myotis (Tate 1941), or Kerivoula (Csorba 2016). All contending genera share Vespertilionidae as the family. Modern analysis of the type specimen found it to have skull fragments from another species and the skin to be in too poor a condition to confirm it as a distinct species. Additionally, it is zoogeographically hard to believe that a bat species could be limited to the island of Singapore.

The holotype is in Naturalis Biodiversity Center in Leiden, Netherlands.
