= Csorba's mouse-eared bat =

Conservation status
- Data Deficient (IUCN 3.1)

Scientific classification
- Kingdom: Animalia
- Phylum: Chordata
- Class: Mammalia
- Order: Chiroptera
- Family: Vespertilionidae
- Genus: Myotis
- Species: M. csorbai

Binomial name
- Myotis csorbai Topal, 1997

Species of bat

The Csorba's mouse-eared bat (Myotis csorbai) is a species of bat belonging to the family Vespertilionidae, the vesper bats. This bat is the only species of bat which is endemic to Nepal.

== Taxonomy ==
Csorba's mouse-eared bat was first formally described in 1997 by the Hungarian mammalogist György Topál with the type series being collected from four localities around Pokhara. This bat is classified in the nominate subgenus of the genus Myotis in the subfamily Myotinae of the family Vespertilionidae.

== Etymology ==
Csorba's mouse-eared bat has a common name and a specific name that both honour the Hungarian mammalogist Gábor Csorba.

== Description ==
Csorba's mouse-eared bat has dark brownish fir on its back with the underside being dull grey. It is most distinctive within the genus Myotis by its cranial and dental characteristics.

== Distribution and habitat ==
Csorba's mouse-eared bat is endemic to Nepal with specimens being collected in the Kathmandu Valley. The only known roost is Kailash Cave, Syangja District.

== Biology ==
Csorba's mouse-eared bat is known from an area which is surrounded by subtropical secondary forest. It roosts in cavesthat it leaves early, before total darkness in the summer months. They have been captured over the river or river bank. It typically flies in slow circles at 10 to 30 m (33 to 98 ft) above the river, rarely descending to 1 to 3 m (3 ft 3 in to 9 ft 10 in) above the bank. They change height in a similar manner to Daubenton's bat (M. daubentonii). This bat hunts for around an hour following emergence just after sunset, but some specimens captured after only 15 to 30 minutes were found to have full stomachs, suggesting these bats are highly effficuient foragers. This species has been found roosting inside crevices and small holes, flying when disturbed, returning to the roost after a while.
