= Orange-fingered myotis =

Conservation status
- Data Deficient (IUCN 3.1)

Scientific classification
- Kingdom: Animalia
- Phylum: Chordata
- Class: Mammalia
- Order: Chiroptera
- Family: Vespertilionidae
- Genus: Myotis
- Species: M. rufopictus

Binomial name
- Myotis rufopictus (Waterhouse, 1845)
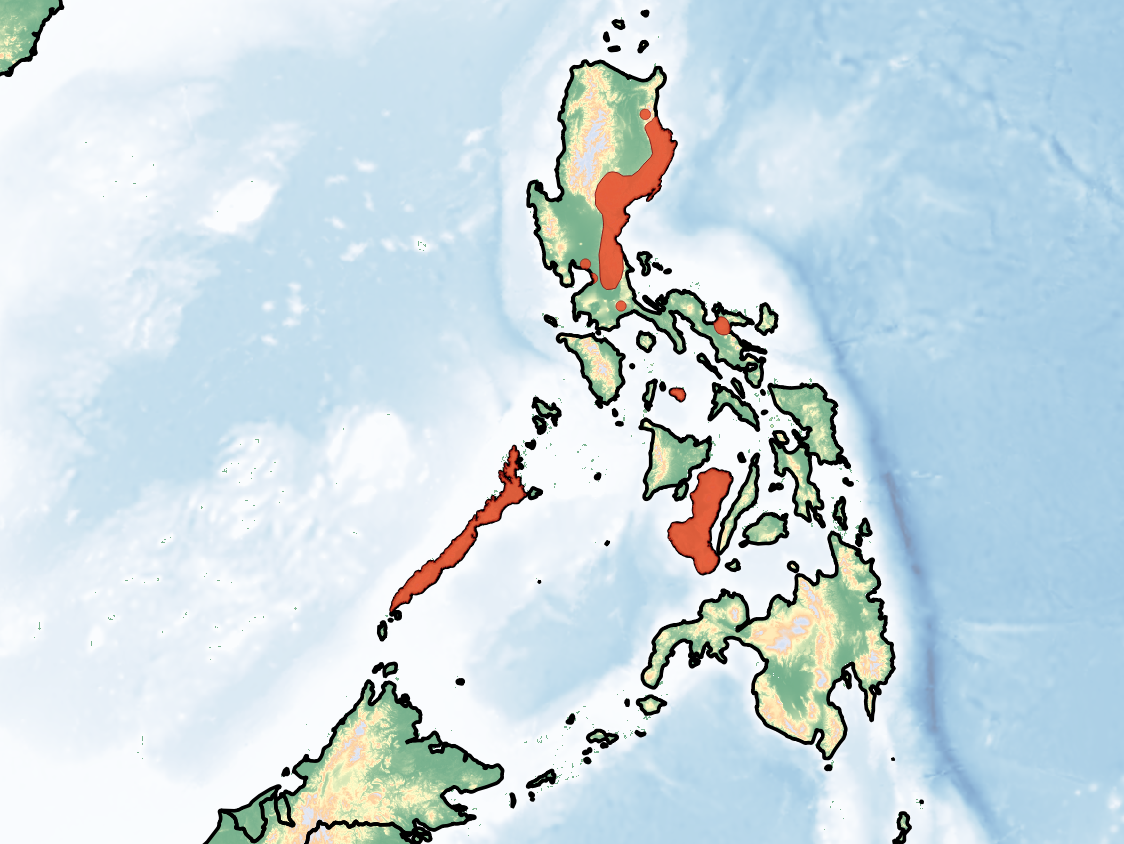

Synonyms
- Myotis formosus rufopictus

Species of vesper bat

The orange-fingered myotis or red-painted myotis (Myotis rufopictus) is a species of vesper bat endemic to the Philippines.

== Taxonomy ==
It was described as a distinct species by George Robert Waterhouse in 1845, but later reclassified as conspecific with, or as a subspecies of Hodgson's bat (M. formosus). However, a 2014 morphological study found major divergence between M. formosus and M. rufopictus, and thus split them from one another. This has also been followed by the American Society of Mammalogists, the IUCN Red List, and ITIS.

== Distribution and habitat ==
It is found only in the northern and central islands of the Philippines. It ranges from Palawan north to Luzon and southeast to Negros. Its natural habitat is lowland and montane tropical forest, as well as agricultural fields.

== Status ==
This species is likely threatened by deforestation for development, logging, agriculture, and mining in the lowland parts of its distribution. However, due to doubts over its extent of occurrence, status, and ecological requirements, it is classified as Data Deficient by the IUCN Red List.
