= Southern myotis =

Conservation status
- Data Deficient (IUCN 3.1)

Scientific classification
- Domain: Eukaryota
- Kingdom: Animalia
- Phylum: Chordata
- Class: Mammalia
- Order: Chiroptera
- Family: Vespertilionidae
- Genus: Myotis
- Species: M. aelleni

Binomial name
- Myotis aelleni Baud, 1979
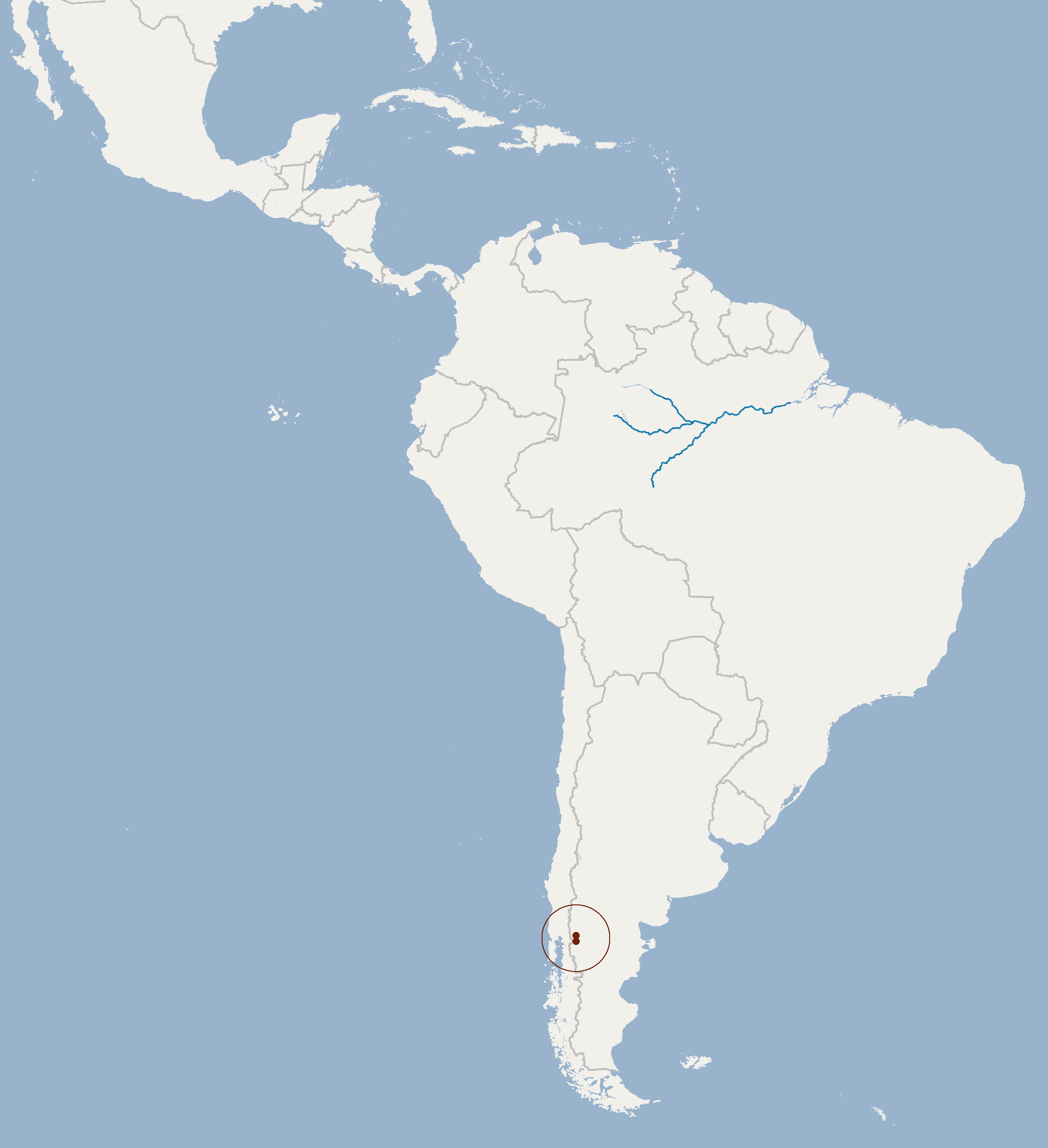

Species of bat

The southern myotis (Myotis aelleni) is a species of vesper bat. It is found in Argentina.

Based on qualitative and quantitative analyses of type specimens, Novaes, Wilson, Ruedi and Moratelli treat this taxon as a junior synonym of Myotis chiloensis.
