= Peters's myotis =

Myotis ater

Conservation status
- Least Concern (IUCN 3.1)

Scientific classification
- Kingdom: Animalia
- Phylum: Chordata
- Class: Mammalia
- Order: Chiroptera
- Family: Vespertilionidae
- Genus: Myotis
- Species: M. ater

Binomial name
- Myotis ater (Peters, 1866)
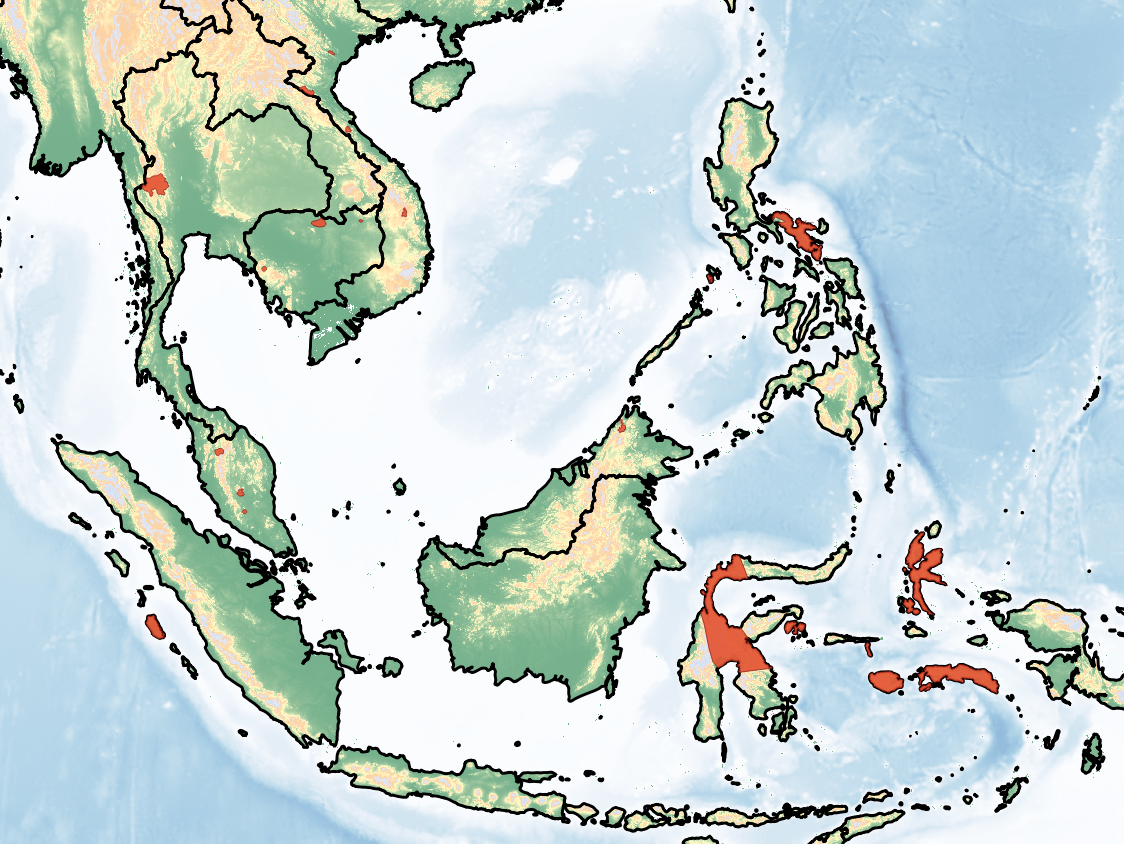

Species of bat

Peters's myotis or the small black myotis (Myotis ater) is a species of insectivorous vesper bat. It is found in Indonesia, Malaysia, Thailand, Vietnam, and the Philippines; its exact distribution is uncertain as it is difficult to distinguish from some other Myotis species. It appears adaptable to a variety of habitats, including primary tropical moist lowland forest, secondary forest, agricultural areas and villages.
