= Kashmir cave bat =

Conservation status
- Data Deficient (IUCN 3.1)

Scientific classification
- Kingdom: Animalia
- Phylum: Chordata
- Class: Mammalia
- Order: Chiroptera
- Family: Vespertilionidae
- Genus: Myotis
- Species: M. longipes

Binomial name
- Myotis longipes Dobson, 1873

Species of bat

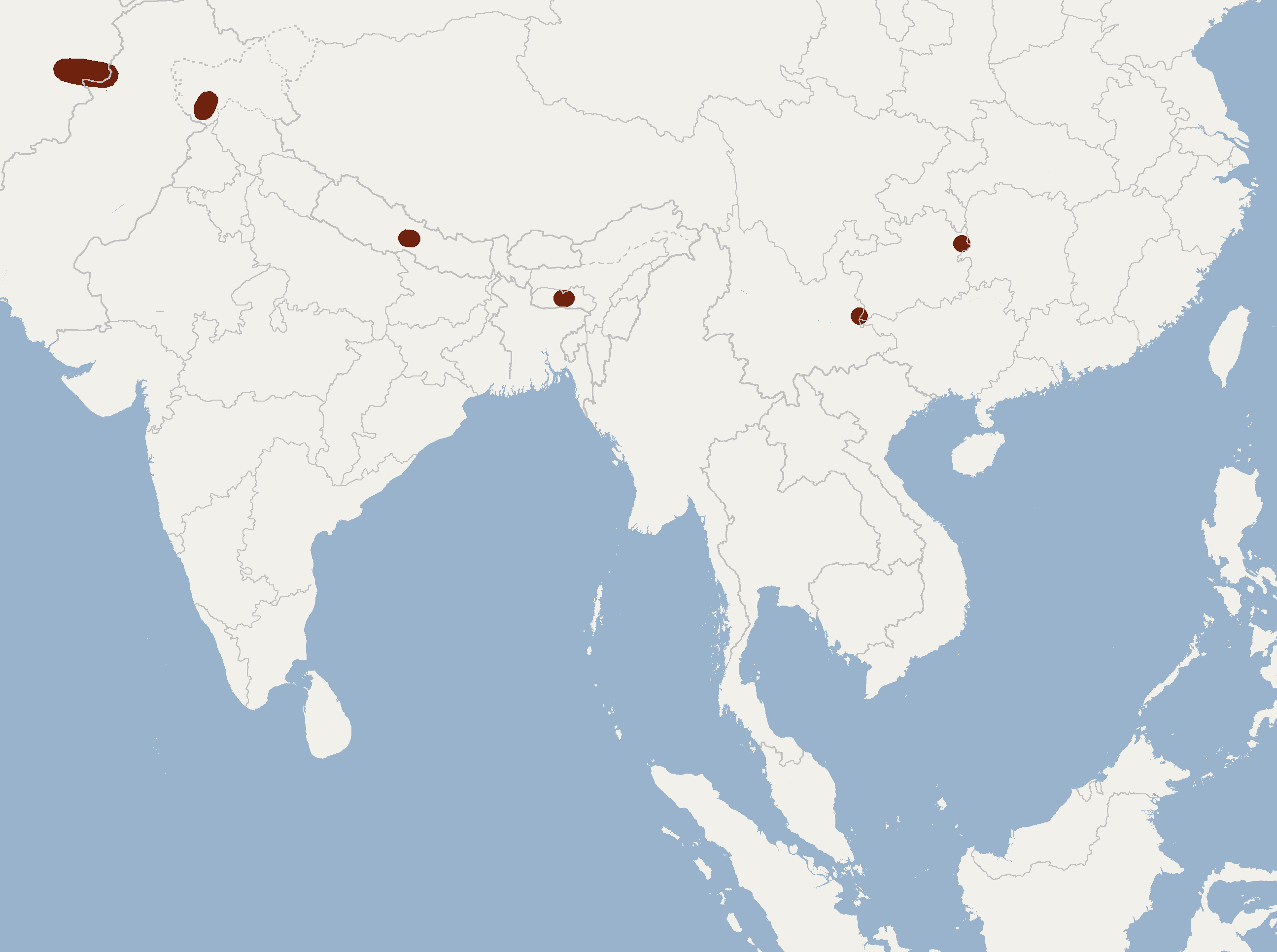
Distribution of Myotis longipes

The Kashmir cave bat (Myotis longipes) is a species of vesper bat. It is endemic to the Western Himalayas of South Asia. It is found in the Western Himalayan broadleaf forests ecoregion, within Bhutan, India, Nepal, Pakistan, and Afghanistan.
