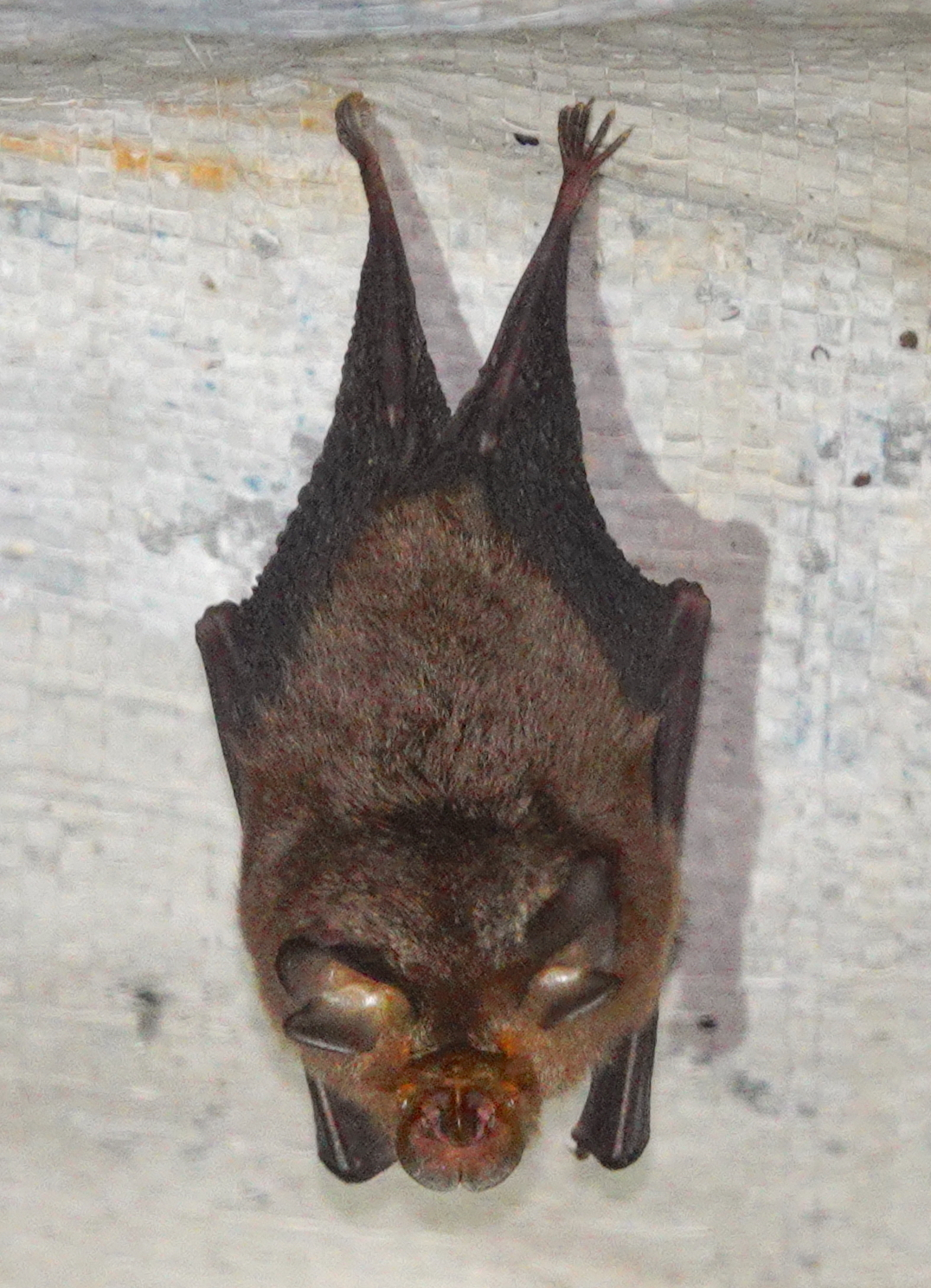

Conservation status
- Data Deficient (IUCN 3.1)

Scientific classification
- Kingdom: Animalia
- Phylum: Chordata
- Class: Mammalia
- Order: Chiroptera
- Family: Rhinolophidae
- Genus: Rhinolophus
- Species: R. keyensis

Binomial name
- Rhinolophus keyensis Peters, 1871
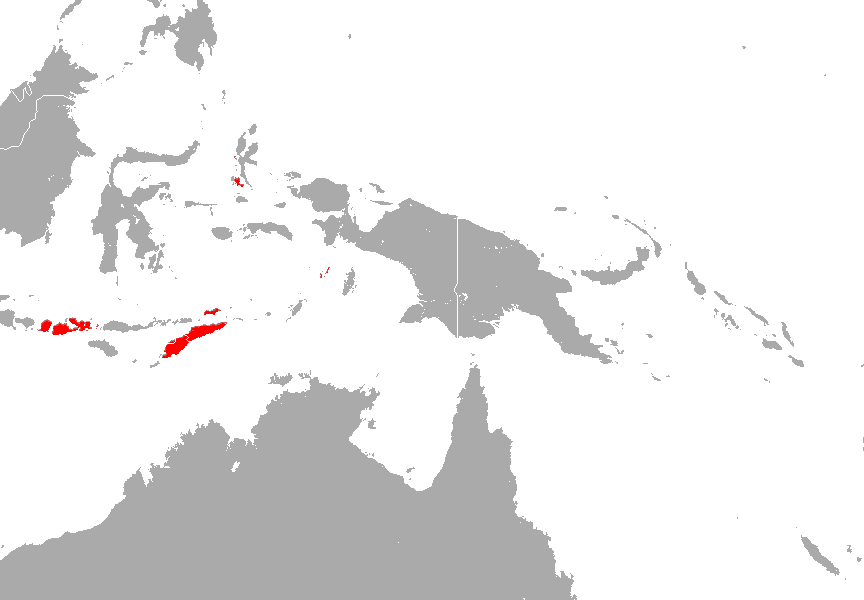
- Insular horseshoe bat range

= Insular horseshoe bat =

Species of bat

The insular horseshoe bat (Rhinolophus keyensis) is a species of bat in the family Rhinolophidae. It is endemic to Indonesia and Timor-Leste.
