= Malagasy mouse-eared bat =

Conservation status
- Least Concern (IUCN 3.1)

Scientific classification
- Kingdom: Animalia
- Phylum: Chordata
- Class: Mammalia
- Order: Chiroptera
- Family: Vespertilionidae
- Genus: Myotis
- Species: M. goudotii

Binomial name
- Myotis goudotii A. Smith, 1834
- Malagasy mouse-eared bat range

Species of bat

The Malagasy mouse-eared bat (Myotis goudotii) is a species of bat in the family Vespertilionidae that is endemic to Madagascar.
