= Kei myotis =

Conservation status
- Least Concern (IUCN 3.1)

Scientific classification
- Kingdom: Animalia
- Phylum: Chordata
- Class: Mammalia
- Order: Chiroptera
- Family: Vespertilionidae
- Genus: Myotis
- Species: M. stalkeri

Binomial name
- Myotis stalkeri Thomas, 1910
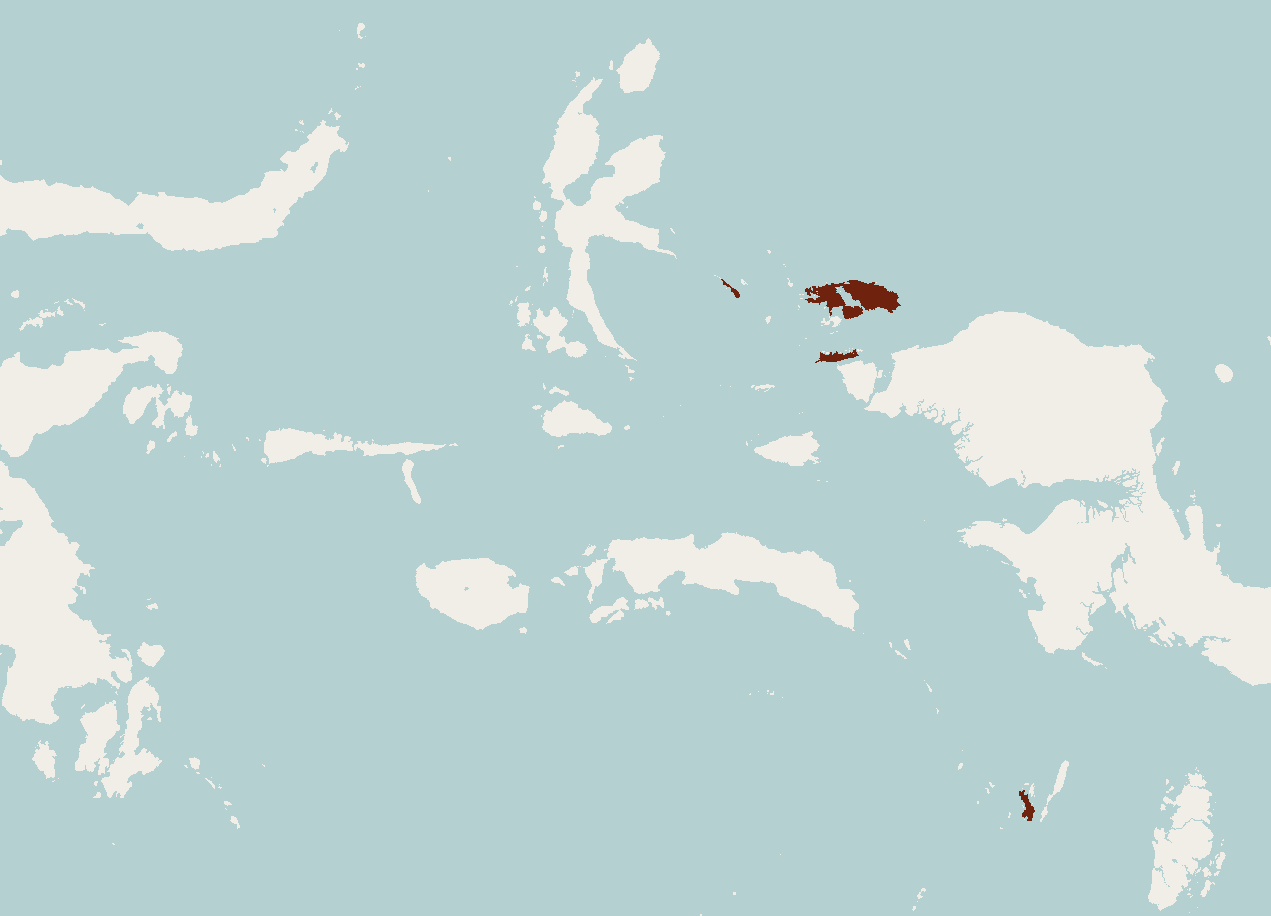
- Myotis stalkeri range

Species of bat

The Kei myotis (Myotis stalkeri) is a species of vesper bat. It is found only in Indonesia.
