= Morris's bat =

Conservation status
- Data Deficient (IUCN 3.1)

Scientific classification
- Kingdom: Animalia
- Phylum: Chordata
- Class: Mammalia
- Order: Chiroptera
- Family: Vespertilionidae
- Genus: Myotis
- Species: M. morrisi

Binomial name
- Myotis morrisi Hill, 1971
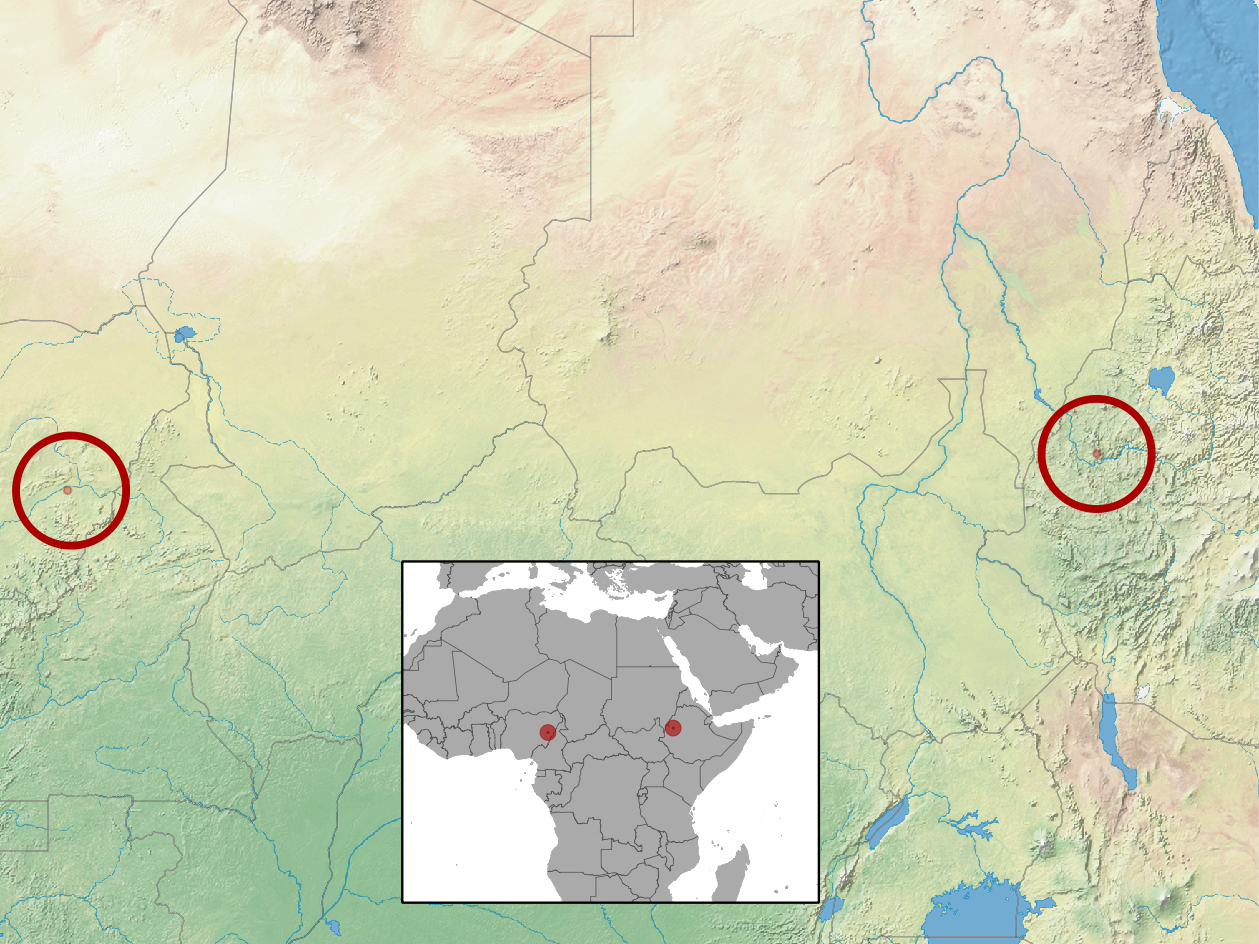

Species of bat

Morris's bat (Myotis morrisi) is a species of vesper bat in the family Vespertilionidae. It is found in Ethiopia and Nigeria. Its natural habitats are dry savanna, moist savanna, caves, and subterranean habitats (other than caves).
