= Eye of Kuruman =

Spring in the Northern Cape, South Africa

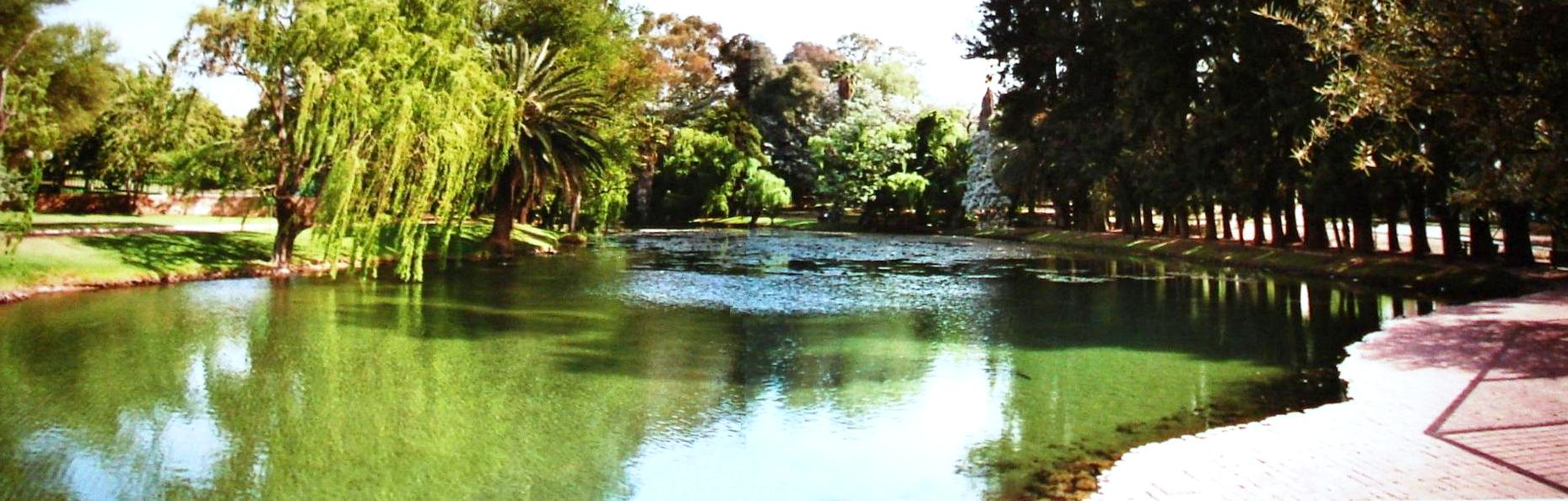
- The Eye of Kuruman

- Location within South Africa
- Location: Kuruman, Northern Cape
- Coordinates: 27°27′48.6″S 23°26′10.68″E
- Type: Natural spring
- Basin countries: South Africa

The Eye of Kuruman (Afrikaans: Die Oog) is a spring in the town of Kuruman (part of the Ga-Segonyana Local Municipality) in the province of Northern Cape, South Africa. Currently, it is known as the largest natural spring in the Southern Hemisphere; although the Te Waikoropupū Springs in Golden Bay, New Zealand has been reliably measured at an average flow some 60 times greater (14 m^{3}/s (220,000 US gal/min)).

The spring forms a small lake in the middle of the town, directly on the N14 road and is located in a fenced park. It has a daily flow of about 20,000 cubic metres (710,000 cu ft) of crystal-clear, potable water. Water from the spring supplies the town of Kuruman.

== History ==
The town of Kuruman is located on the border of South Africa’s Northern Cape and North West provinces. The year 1895 was the only time in recorded history where the stream was constant throughout and moved from The Eye, down the stream Kuruman river, Molopo River, Orange River and finally into the Atlantic Ocean. Originally, Tswana herders used the large spring as a water hole. The Tswana name for The Eye is Segonyana which means "small calabash".

In 1885, the British classified the area as part of the Crown Colony of British Bechuanaland. This classification of land prohibited the Tswana people from using the stream for any purpose. The upper Kuruman valley became a crown reserve and The Eye of Kuruman became the town site. Access to the valley became segregated by race in the twentieth century under the Union government. A modern irrigation project was operated by the municipality of Kuruman after 1918 and, in 1919 black cultivators were evicted from using water from The Eye. However, black people continued to use the stream and moved 5 miles down the stream to Seodin. The water at the Seodin area had a much weaker stream making irrigation difficult for the Tswana people. The government's Department of Native Affairs drilled bore holes to assist the black farmers in 1940 however, this was still insufficient to sustain cultivation. In 1962, Apartheid legislation led to the forced removal of black people from Seodin. The 'whites-only' irrigation project never commercialised despite state aid.

In 1992, The Eye was declared a Provincial Heritage Site.

== Cave ==
The Eye of Kuruman cave forms part of the eight caves on the dolomitic Ghaap Plateau of the Northern Cape. The Eye of Kuruman cave from which the springs emerge has been documented form as early as the nineteenth century. The first sketch of the cave was made in 1907 measuring a total of 138 meters.

== Description of Cave ==
The dolomite cave has a series of cracks where streams of water flow. The streams of water travel through various passages and emerge together at the base of a cliff described as Die Oog in Afrikaans which translates as 'The Eye'.

== Biodiversity ==
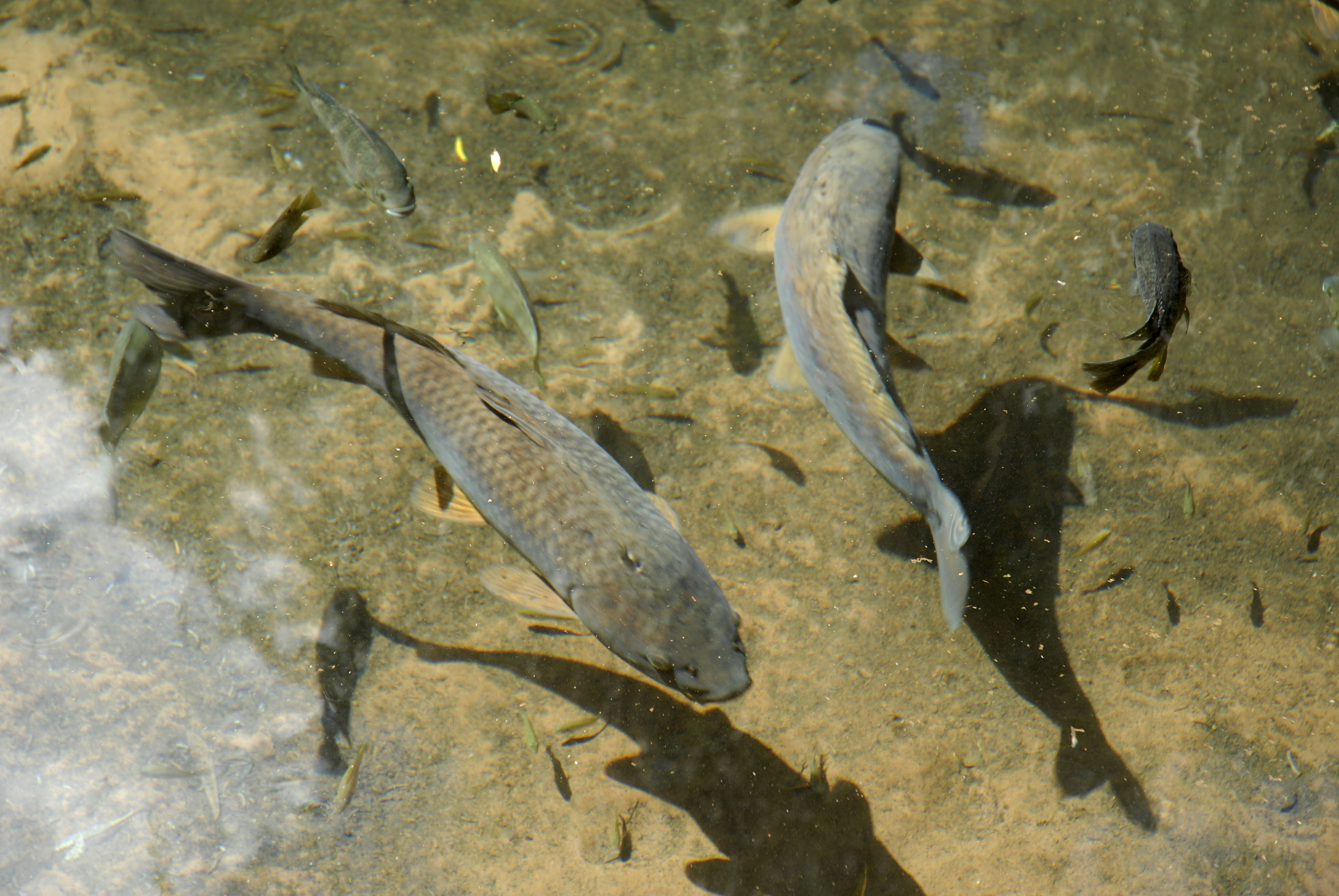

Both the air and water temperature of the cave is about 21 °C (70 °F) with a relative humidity of about 99% The common bent-wing bat (Miniopterus schreibersii) and Geoffroy’s horseshoe bat (Rhinolophus clivosus) were recorded in the Eye of Kuruman cave in 1985. Due to high levels of humidity as well as consistent human disturbance, very few bats are now found in the cave.

Aquatic animals that are found in the cave include:

- the air-breathing catfish Clarias gariepinus
- southern mouth-brooder (Pseudocrenilabrus philander)
- Tilapia spp
- Rhagovelia, a water skater
- Detritivores include:
  - unidentified Isopoda,
  - Diplopoda of the Polydesmida,
  - Psocoptera (psocidae) and
  - Ectobiidae
- spiders of the families:
  - Amaurobiidae
  - Pholcidae and
  - Sicariidae

Cixiidae survive by sucking the sap of plant roots that penetrate into the cave. There are also unidentified small flies (Diptera) in the cave.

== See also ==
- Wonderwerk Cave
- Kogelbeen Cave
- Sacred caves of the Basotho
