= Kogelbeen Cave =

Cave in Northern Cape, South Africa

The Kogelbeen Cave forms part of eight caves on the dolomitic Ghaap Plateau of the Northern Cape, South Africa. It is commonly known as Kogelbeengrotte in Afrikaans. The cave is located on Kogelbeen Farm in Pixley ka Seme District Municipality. It is the longest known cave in the Northern Cape with a length of 788 meters. The Kogelbeen Cave has a diverse fauna with over 39 species living in five life zones within the cave.

== History ==
The cave was first described in speleological literature in 1964. The cave is classified as a South African Natural Heritage Site under the South African Natural Heritage programme

== Surveys and explorations ==
=== Irish and Marais survey ===
The total cave length was measured at 788 metres (2,585 ft). The cave entrance was measured with a 90 by 30 metres (295 ft × 98 ft) doline which leads to a 30 by 15 metres (98 ft × 49 ft) sinkhole. The floor slopes at a depth of just less than 8 metres (26 ft). The doline walls have some holes; however, the main site of the cave starts at the deepest and southern part of the doline. The dry passage is a short and dusky section above the entrance on two levels, which leads for 70 metres (230 ft) in an eastward direction. There is a collapsing overhang to the north of the cave. The main cave sharply descends to a small chamber which is approximately 22 metres (72 ft). Along the north wall of the main chamber is a small hole in the floor. This hole leads to a narrow and moist passage known as the CO_{2} passage. In this passage, lethal CO_{2} levels are reached after penetration of a depth of 43 metres (141 ft). These lethal levels of CO_{2} prevented further exploration. The main cave continues into a main chamber which is approximately at 31 metres (102 ft). Southeast of the main chamber lies a long passage called the bat passage, which slopes upwards for about 120 metres (390 ft). There are a few minor parallel passages linking with the bat passage. The passage has a very high ceiling which is more prominent towards the end of the passage. Westward of the main chamber lies a small crawlway which leads to a low and wide passage called the water passage. The water passage is filled with numerous shallow seepage pools. The water table is reached at 57 metres (187 ft).

=== Hitchcock survey ===
The 1980 Hitchcock survey differs from the Irish & Marais survey with regards to the CO_{2} passage. Hitchcock penetrated the CO_{2} passage all the way to the water table, but makes no mention of the lethal carbon dioxide levels. The air composition is described as 'very good'. Hitchcock measured the water table level in the water passage at 53 m unlike the 57 m measured from the Irish and Marais survey. The water level in the CO_{2} passage is measured at 73 metres (240 ft).

The current lethal CO_{2} levels make it near impossible to confirm Hitchcock's measurements of the carbon dioxide passage.

== Climate ==
The main chamber has a temperature of 19 °C (66 °F); the temperature rises to 21 °C (70 °F) in the bat passage and ultimately 22 °C (72 °F) in the water passage. The relative humidity in the water passage and the bat passage reaches 100%. The humidity drops to 98% in the main chamber and 80% in the entrance passage. The water temperature of the main pool is 21 °C (70 °F). Subjective commentary on the carbon dioxide levels over time indicate an increase in CO_{2} over the past two decades. Hitchcock reported no CO_{2} levels after penetrating both the water passage and the carbon dioxide passage in 1980. Irish and Marais reported high CO_{2} in the water passage and lethal CO_{2} presence in the CO_{2} passage in 1991. The survey in 1997 found the water passage to be even more uncomfortable with the high CO_{2} composition of the air and the CO_{2} passage impossible to survey.

== Life zones ==
There are five life zones in the cave that are distinguishable namely:

1. The entrance zone includes the doline as well as the twilight cave areas (seven taxa)
2. The dark dry zone includes the dry passage (nine taxa)
3. The wet zone includes the main passage, water passage and bat passage (twenty four taxa)
4. The CO_{2} zone includes the CO_{2} passage (two taxa)
5. The aquatic zone includes the groundwater pools and one taxon

== Biospeleology ==
Animals found using the doline and entrance of the Kogelbeen Cave include:

- Chacma baboon
- Rock hyrax
- Cape porcupine
- Rock pigeons
- Pale-winged starlings
- Western barn owls
- Boettger's dainty frogs
- Opilionid spiders

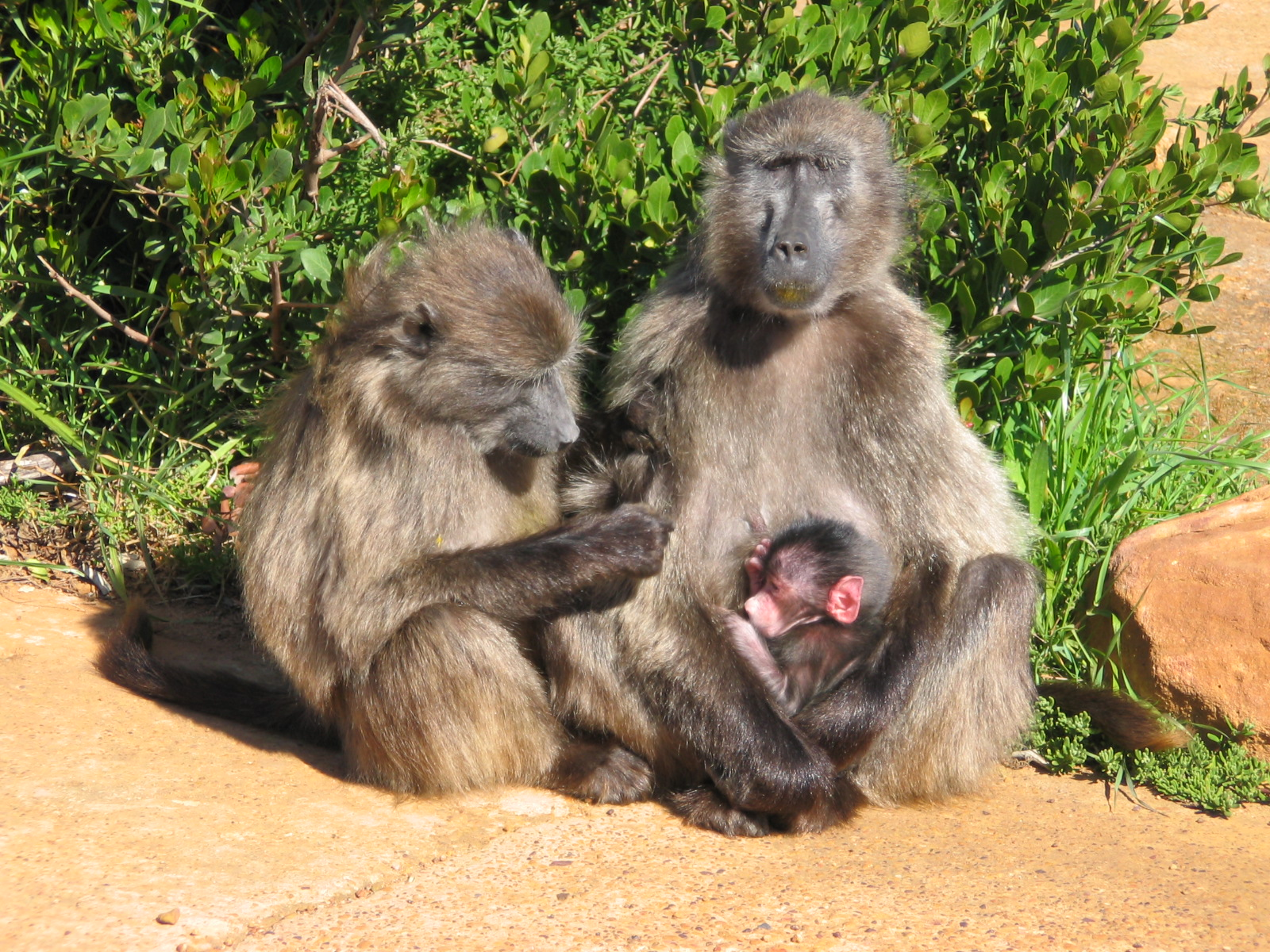
Baboons that are found at the entrance of the Kogelbeen Cave

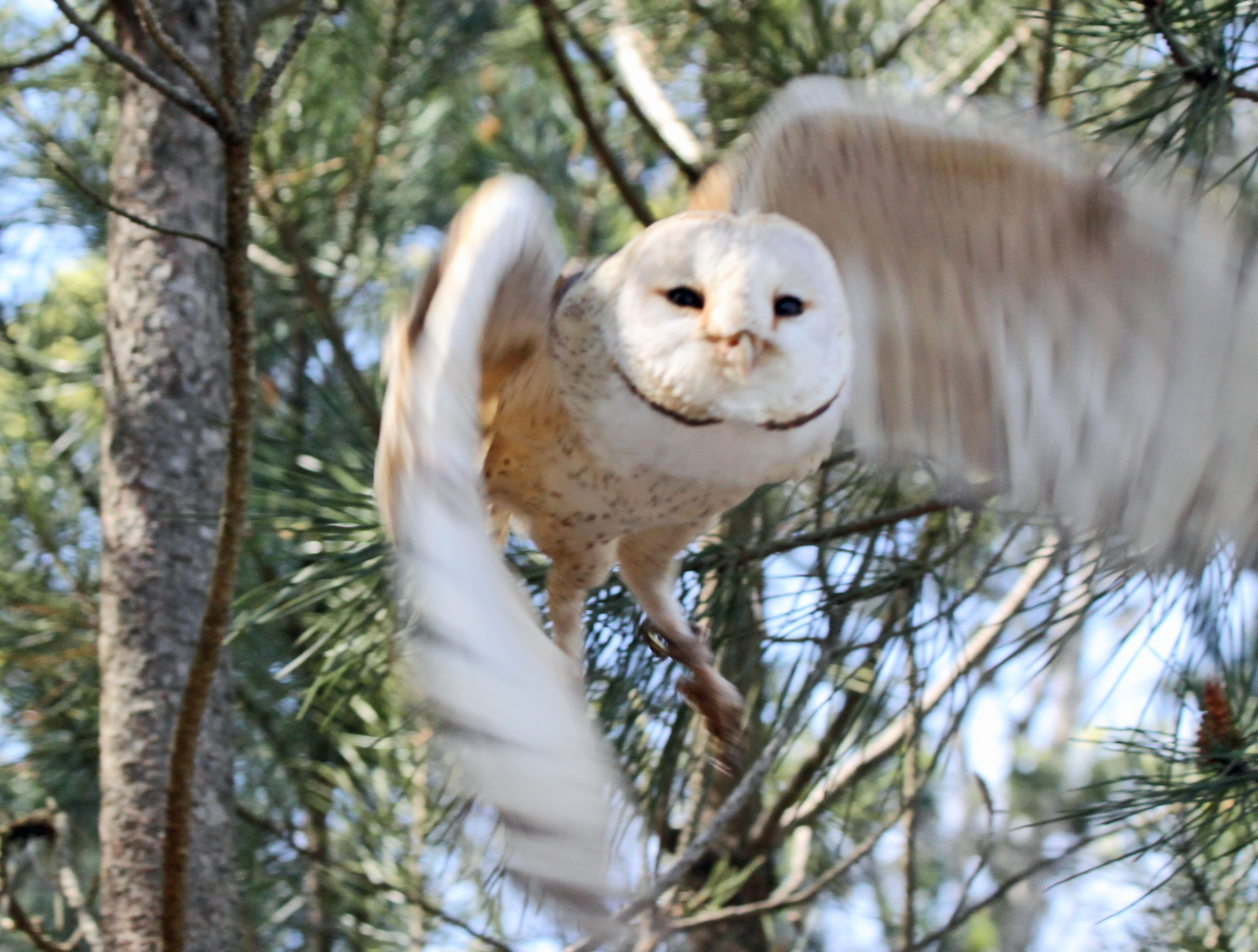
Barn Owls found in the cave

The doline serves well for moisture-loving creatures who would otherwise not survive in other areas of Kogelbeen. The Kogelbeen cave also functions as an important bat roost being home to three bat species, including the common bent-wing bat with a population of over 60,000, the Geoffroy's horseshoe bat and the Darling's horseshoe bat, with a combined population of about 5000. Other bat species found include:

- Dent's horseshoe bat
- Egyptian slit-faced bat
- Cape hairy bat
- Cape serotine
- Egyptian free-tailed bat

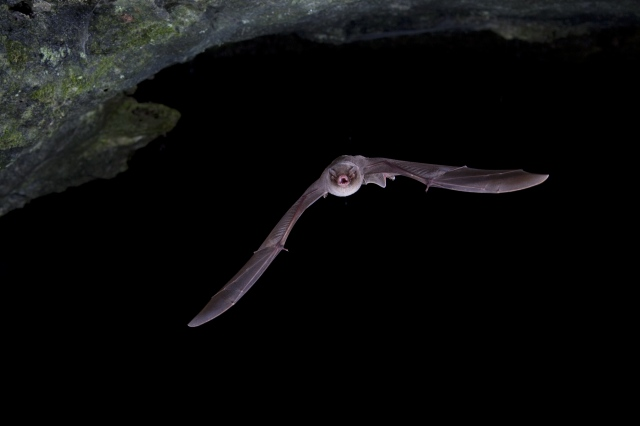
Common bent-winged bats with a population of over 60,000 in the Kogelbeen Caves

These bats are mostly found in the main chamber as well as the bat passage. Considering the large population of bats, unexpectedly thin guano deposits are found.

Species that are dependent on the guano deposits include:

- A white fungus that grows on the guano as well as bat remains,
- Psychodidae flies commonly found in the bat passage with multitudes of their nematocerous larvae found in wet guano,
- Flies including the Camillidae D. barraclough, pers. com and another two unidentifiable species

Detritivores that feed on older guano deposits include:

- Isopods from the Oniscus species as well as small red mites of the Uropodidae family,
- Lepidospora species are only found in the carbon dioxide passage,
- Crickets such as Orthoptera and Gryllidae,
- Ptinidae beetles (Mezium species),
- unidentified Psocoptera,
- Eurycho species Coleptera and Tenebrionidae as well as
- Large hairy caterpillars - Lepidoptera larvae

Predators in the Kogelbeen Cave include:

- A large variety of spiders but mostly Gnaphosidae, Dictynida and other Ariadne species
- Assassin spiders Reduviidae

Parasites in the Kogelbeen cave include the mite of the Argus species Argasidae, which feed on the birds and bats of the cave.

Aquatic fauna in the cave include stygobiotic amphipod Sternophysinx Basilobata, which is only found from Kogelbeen.

There is a mammal checklist of the species found in the cave at the Bloemfontein National Museum.

== Deaths ==
The community members around the Kogelbeen cave believe that an unspecified person died in the cave. It is believed that there is an unknown disease that exists in the cave. Smith reported that some of the members of his team fell ill due to histoplasmosis. Hitchcock's party used masks as a preventative measure against unknown diseases. No recorded members of the Irish and Marais party were affected by illness from the Kogelbeen cave.

== Development potential ==
Griekwastad publicity association has sought assessments of the cave as a possible tourism area. Factors that result in the cave being unfavourable for tourism include difficulty in movement around the cave, lack of cave formations, unpleasant CO_{2} conditions in some areas, and threat of disease. Fishing enthusiasts frequently use the areas in the cave for fishing using a man-made outpost structure. Further tourist development would result in a major loss of the bat species, thus threatening the rest of the fauna.

== See also ==
- Cango Caves
- Wonderwerk Cave
- Sacred caves of the Basotho
- Boesmansgat
