= Ga-Segonyana Local Municipality elections =

The Ga-Segonyana Local Municipality council consists of twenty-nine members elected by mixed-member proportional representation. Fifteen councillors are elected by first-past-the-post voting in fifteen wards, while the remaining fourteen are chosen from party lists so that the total number of party representatives is proportional to the number of votes received. In the election of 1 November 2021 the African National Congress (ANC) won a majority of seventeen seats.

== Results ==
The following table shows the composition of the council after past elections.

Event	ANC	COPE	DA	EFF	UCDP	Other	Total
2006 election	14	—	1	—	2	1	18
2011 election	20	1	3	—	1	1	25
2016 election	18	1	3	5	0	0	27
2021 election	17	0	3	7	0	2	29

== March 2006 election ==
The following table shows the results of the 2006 election.

Party	Ward			List			Total seats
Party	Votes	%	Seats	Votes	%	Seats	Total seats
African National Congress	13,934	77.30	8	13,944	77.65	6	14
United Christian Democratic Party	1,332	7.39	0	1,550	8.63	2	2
Democratic Alliance	1,120	6.21	1	1,092	6.08	0	1
Independent Democrats	756	4.19	0	941	5.24	1	1
African Christian Democratic Party	443	2.46	0	430	2.39	0	0
Independent candidates	440	2.44	0				0
Total	18,025	100.00	9	17,957	100.00	9	18
Valid votes	18,025	97.83		17,957	97.50		
Invalid/blank votes	399	2.17		461	2.50		
Total votes	18,424	100.00		18,418	100.00		
Registered voters/turnout	37,205	49.52		37,205	49.50		

== May 2011 election ==
The following table shows the results of the 2011 election.

Party	Ward			List			Total seats
Party	Votes	%	Seats	Votes	%	Seats	Total seats
African National Congress	18,944	75.55	11	19,646	78.28	9	20
Democratic Alliance	3,044	12.14	2	3,132	12.48	1	3
Congress of the People	1,366	5.45	0	1,414	5.63	1	1
United Christian Democratic Party	482	1.92	0	603	2.40	1	1
Independent candidates	765	3.05	0				0
Freedom Front Plus	332	1.32	0	195	0.78	0	0
African Christian Democratic Party	142	0.57	0	106	0.42	0	0
Total	25,075	100.00	13	25,096	100.00	12	25
Valid votes	25,075	97.47		25,096	97.65		
Invalid/blank votes	652	2.53		605	2.35		
Total votes	25,727	100.00		25,701	100.00		
Registered voters/turnout	43,376	59.31		43,376	59.25		

== August 2016 election ==
The following table shows the results of the 2016 election.

Party	Ward			List			Total seats
Party	Votes	%	Seats	Votes	%	Seats	Total seats
African National Congress	17,952	64.15	13	18,264	65.98	5	18
Economic Freedom Fighters	5,178	18.50	0	5,333	19.26	5	5
Democratic Alliance	2,868	10.25	1	2,942	10.63	2	3
Congress of the People	782	2.79	0	550	1.99	1	1
Independent candidates	715	2.56	0				0
Freedom Front Plus	267	0.95	0	296	1.07	0	0
United Christian Democratic Party	222	0.79	0	298	1.08	0	0
Total	27,984	100.00	14	27,683	100.00	13	27
Valid votes	27,984	98.50		27,683	98.19		
Invalid/blank votes	426	1.50		510	1.81		
Total votes	28,410	100.00		28,193	100.00		
Registered voters/turnout	49,469	57.43		49,469	56.99		

== November 2021 election ==
The following table shows the results of the 2021 election.

Party	Ward			List			Total seats
Party	Votes	%	Seats	Votes	%	Seats	Total seats
African National Congress	11,702	54.17	14	12,233	56.76	3	17
Economic Freedom Fighters	4,482	20.75	0	4,815	22.34	7	7
Democratic Alliance	2,408	11.15	1	2,421	11.23	2	3
Independent candidates	1,648	7.63	0				0
South African Royal Kingdoms Organization	375	1.74	0	501	2.32	1	1
Forum for Service Delivery	208	0.96	0	488	2.26	1	1
Patriotic Alliance	242	1.12	0	361	1.68	0	0
Freedom Front Plus	222	1.03	0	228	1.06	0	0
United Christian Democratic Party	199	0.92	0	216	1.00	0	0
Congress of the People	114	0.53	0	262	1.22	0	0
African Transformation Movement	2	0.01	0	27	0.13	0	0
Total	21,602	100.00	15	21,552	100.00	14	29
Valid votes	21,602	97.84		21,552	97.66		
Invalid/blank votes	476	2.16		516	2.34		
Total votes	22,078	100.00		22,068	100.00		
Registered voters/turnout	50,908	43.37		50,908	43.35		
