= Nicoletia =

Scientific classification
- Domain: Eukaryota
- Kingdom: Animalia
- Phylum: Arthropoda
- Class: Insecta
- Order: Zygentoma
- Family: Nicoletiidae
- Genus: Nicoletia; Gervais, 1843

Species
- see text

Genus of silverfishes

Nicoletia is a genus of silverfish in the family Nicoletiidae. Most of the ~30 species originally placed in this genus have subsequently been moved into other genera, primarily Coletinia and Anelpistina, so there are only 9 species presently in the genus.

== Species ==
- Nicoletia anophthalma (Bilimek, 1867)
- Nicoletia armata Silvestri, 1901
- Nicoletia cavicola Joseph, 1882
- Nicoletia emersoni Folsom, 1923
- Nicoletia geophila Gervais, 1844
- Nicoletia maggii Grassi & Rovelli, 1880
- Nicoletia neotropicalis Silvestri, 1901
- Nicoletia phytophila Gervais, 1844
- Nicoletia tergata Mills, 1940
