= Atelura montana =

Scientific classification
- Domain: Eukaryota
- Kingdom: Animalia
- Phylum: Arthropoda
- Class: Insecta
- Order: Zygentoma
- Family: Nicoletiidae
- Genus: Atelura
- Species: A. montana

Binomial name
- Atelura montana (Stach, 1939)

Species of insect

Atelura montana is a species of nicoletiid in the family Nicoletiidae.
