= Protrinemuridae =

Scientific classification
- Kingdom: Animalia
- Phylum: Arthropoda
- Clade: Pancrustacea
- Class: Insecta
- Order: Zygentoma
- Family: Protrinemuridae; Mendes, 1988

Genera
- see text

Family of silverfishes

Protrinemuridae is a family of primitive insects belonging to the order Zygentoma. The family was previously classified as a subfamily of the Nicoletiidae, but raised to family level in 2002.

The family comprises four genera:

- Protrinemura Silvestri, 1942
- Protrinemurella Mendes, 2002
- Protrinemuroides Mendes, 2002
- Trinemophora Schaeffer, 1897
