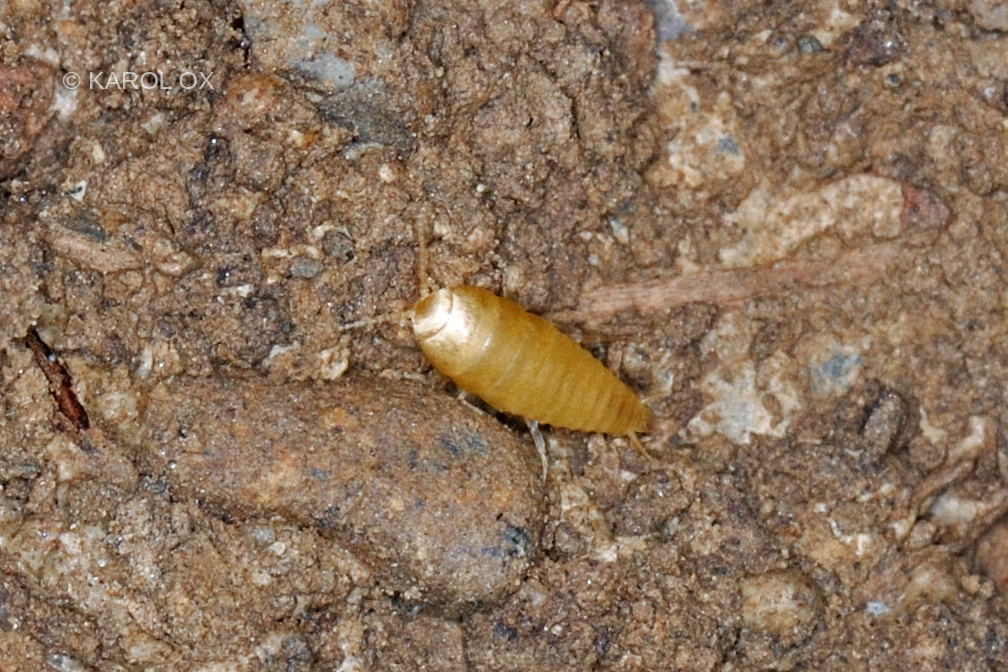
- Atelura formicaria

Scientific classification
- Domain: Eukaryota
- Kingdom: Animalia
- Phylum: Arthropoda
- Class: Insecta
- Order: Zygentoma
- Family: Nicoletiidae
- Subfamily: Atelurinae
- Genus: Atelura; Heyden, 1855

Species
- Atelura formicaria Atelura montana Atelura valencianica

= Atelura =

Genus of silverfishes

Atelura is a genus of primitive insects belonging to the order Zygentoma.
