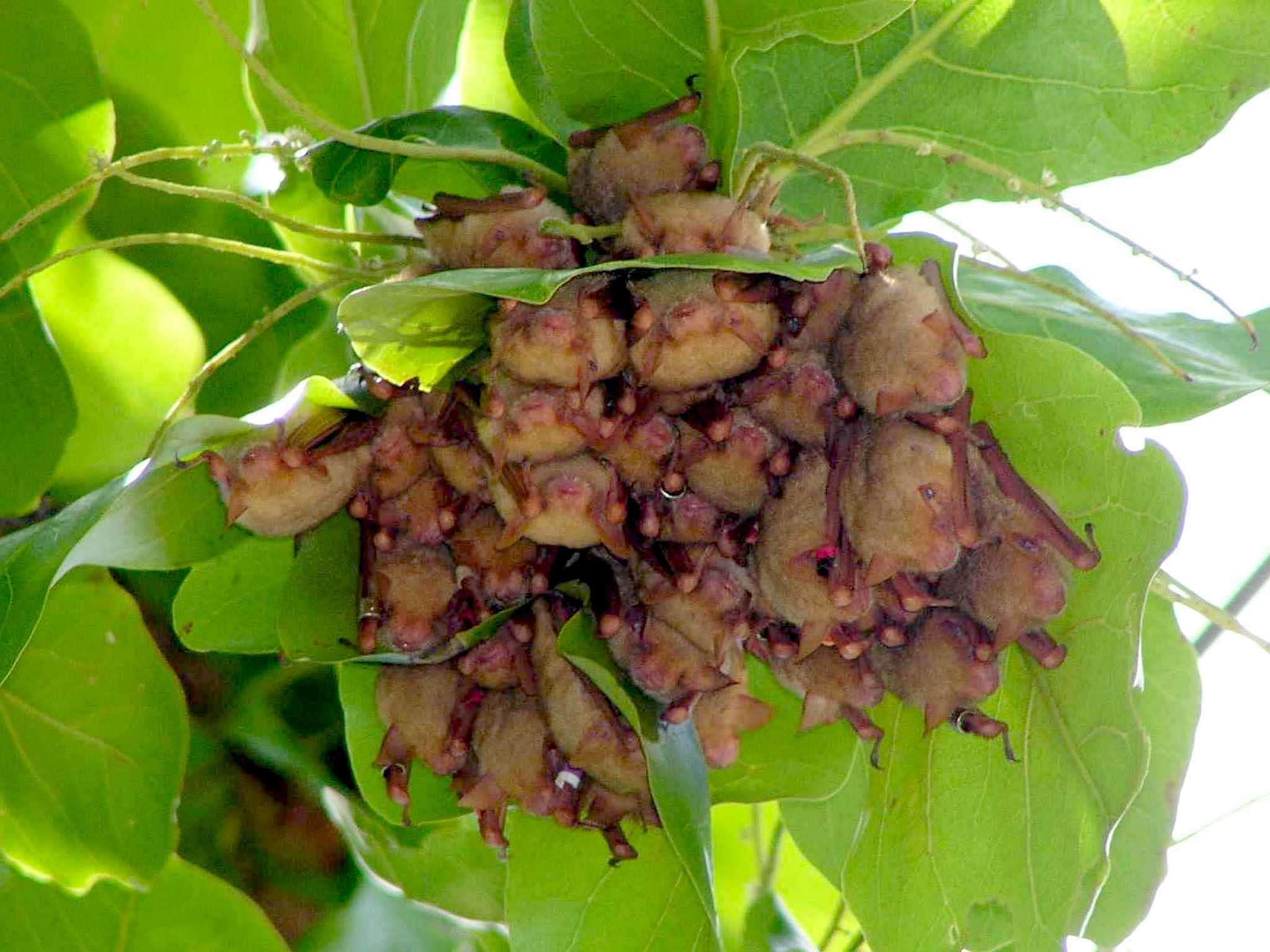
- Subspecies flavus in Taiwan

Conservation status
- Near Threatened (IUCN 3.1)

Scientific classification
- Kingdom: Animalia
- Phylum: Chordata
- Class: Mammalia
- Order: Chiroptera
- Family: Vespertilionidae
- Genus: Myotis
- Species: M. formosus

Binomial name
- Myotis formosus (Hodgson, 1835)
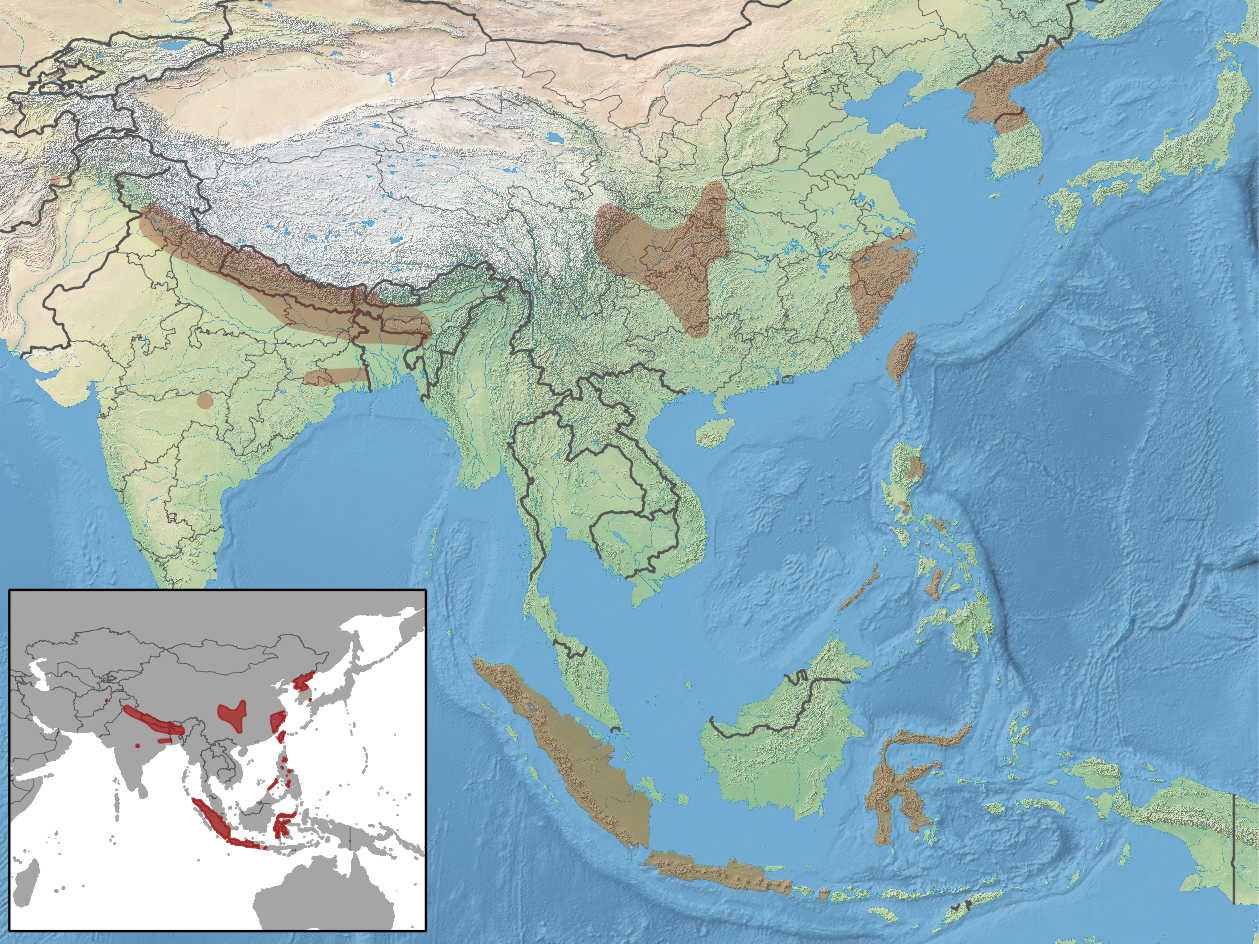
- Hodgson's bat range (includes M. rufoniger, M. rufopictus, M. weberi, and M. bartelsii)

Synonyms
- Myotis flavus Shamel, 1944

= Hodgson's bat =

Species of bat

Hodgson's bat (Myotis formosus), also called the copper-winged bat or black-and-orange myotis, is a species of vesper bat in the genus Myotis, the mouse-eared bats. Favouring mountain forests, it is found throughout Central, Southeast, and East Asia, from Afghanistan to Taiwan. It is about 5 centimetres (2.0 in) long and is distinguished from most other species of bat in this range by its yellowish colouration.

== Taxonomy ==
Previously, Hodgson's bat was thought to be a single wide-ranging species with a distribution from Central Asia east to Taiwan, north to Korea, and south to Indonesia. However, a 2014 morphological study found significant divergence in morphology between different populations of the species, and thus split it into several distinct species: Hodgson's bat (M. formosus sensu stricto, ranging from Central Asia east to Taiwan), the reddish-black myotis (M. rufoniger, ranging from Laos and Vietnam north to Korea and Tsushima Island, and also east to Taiwan), the orange-fingered myotis (M. rufopictus, endemic to the Philippines), Bartels's myotis (M. bartelsii, endemic to Sumatra and Java in Indonesia), and Weber's myotis (M. weberi, endemic to Sulawesi in Indonesia). Based on wing patterning, the study found M. formosus to be the sister species to Geoffroy's bat (M. emarginatus) and the Cape hairy bat (M. tricolor).

The subspecies flavus, found in Taiwan and later discovered in mainland China, was reclassified as a distinct species in 2010. However, the 2014 morphological study found M. flavus to still be conspecific with M. formosus, and all taxonomic authorities still classify it within M. formosus.

== Description ==
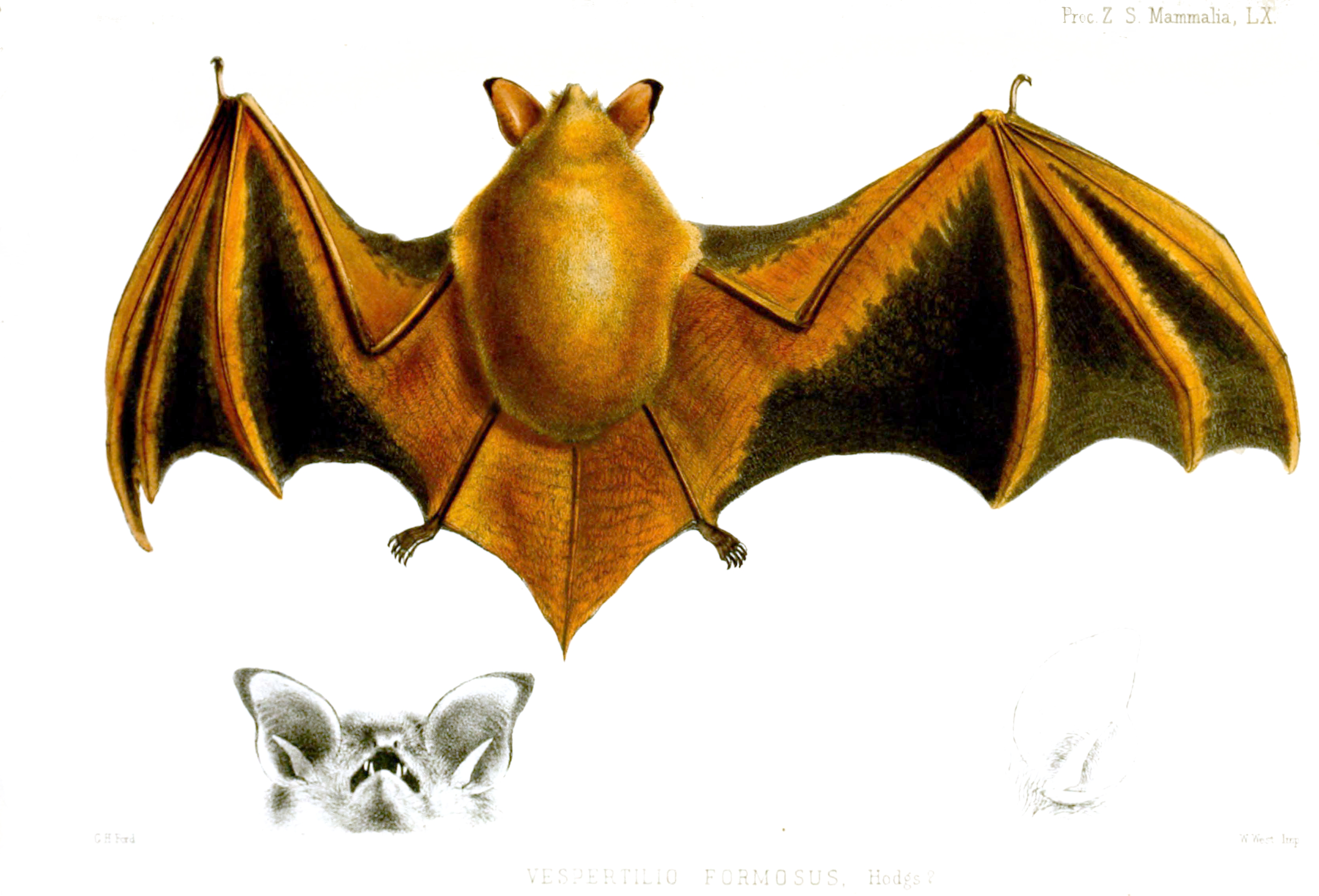
Illustration by George Henry Ford

An adult Hodgson's bat has a head and body length of 4.3 to 5.7 centimetres (1.7 to 2.2 in), a tail length of 3.6 to 5.6 centimetres (1.4 to 2.2 in) and a forearm length of 4.3 to 5.2 centimetres (1.7 to 2.0 in) and weigh about 15 grams (0.53 oz). The colouring of the short dense fur that covers its body is much more yellow than is that of other bats found within its range.

== Distribution and habitat ==
Hodgson's bat is native to Nangarhar Province in Afghanistan, the Sylhet Division of Bangladesh, the Indian provinces of Punjab, Jammu and Kashmir, Himachal Pradesh, Maharashtra, Meghalaya, Jharkhand, Sikkim, Uttarakhand, West Bengal, Bihar, Assam and Mizoram, and the Central and Western parts of Nepal at altitudes up to about 3,000 metres (9,840 ft). It is also known from eastern and central China and Taiwan, where it is likely sympatric with the previously-conspecific Myotis rufoniger. It is found in both upland and lowland primary and secondary forests and roosts in caves and trees, and sometimes buildings.

== Behaviour ==
Hodgson's bat is an insectivore, locating its insect prey by echolocation during flight and catching it on the wing. In Taiwan, breeding begins in March and peaks in May. Up to two hundred females congregate in an underground maternity colony and give birth during May and June. Prior to this, the bats spend an average of nine hours foraging at night, but this time is reduced after giving birth. Newborn young measure about 2.15 centimetres (0.85 in) long and weigh about 3.7 grams (0.13 oz). They remain in the roost while the mother forages and for the first week stay in their birth location. After that, they begin to crawl around and by the third week they are able to take short flights. The mother spends much time grooming the newly-born youngster but by the time it is two weeks old, she normally roosts away from it. Between mid-August and early October the bats leave the maternity cave and spend the winter in hibernation in caves elsewhere.

== Status ==
Hodgson's bat has a wide range throughout Asia, and was previously not thought to be threatened. However, more recent studies have split many of the populations previously assigned to this species into other species, and a different picture has emerged of the populations still classified in M. formosus, indicating a heavy decline over the past few decades. It has seen an especially dramatic decline in Taiwan, with the largest colonies declining by over 90% and likely losses of over 70% of individuals over the last 30 years. Similar patterns of decline have been suspected over the rest of its range. It has been proposed that heavy pesticide use in Taiwan may play a factor in the species' decline, as pesticide residues have been noted in its feces. It also seems to be averse to light pollution, which may contribute to habitat degradation, disturbances to the roost, and disrupting migrations. Caving may also be a threat, as this species is thought to be at least partly cave-dwelling during the winter. It is likely also threatened by deforestation due to it depending on forest habitats for part of the year. Due to its conspicuous coloration, this species may also be at risk of being captured and being used as an ornament. This prominent decline, combined with it still being a wide-ranging species, has led it to be classified as Near Threatened on the IUCN Red List.
