= Protrinemura =

Scientific classification
- Kingdom: Animalia
- Phylum: Arthropoda
- Clade: Pancrustacea
- Class: Insecta
- Order: Zygentoma
- Family: Nicoletiidae
- Genus: Protrinemura; Silvestri, 1942
- Species: P. mediterranea

Binomial name
- Protrinemura mediterranea Mendes, 1988

Genus of silverfishes

Protrinemura is a genus of silverfishes in the family Protrinemuridae. Three species are currently known:

- Protrinemura orientalis Silvestri, 1942 – China: Fujian province
- Protrinemura mediterranea Mendes, 1988 – Greece: Cyclades archipelago
- Protrinemura leclerci Mendes, 2002 – Thailand: Chiang Rai province
