= Mothibistad =

- Location within Northern Cape Location within South Africa
- Coordinates: 27.399°S 23.489°E
- Country: South Africa
- Province: Northern Cape
- District: John Taolo Gaetsewe
- Municipality: Ga-Segonyana

Area
  - Total: 5.49 km^{2} (2.12 sq mi)

Population (2011)
  - Total: 9,616
  - Density: 1,750/km^{2} (4,540/sq mi)

Racial makeup (2011)
  - Black African: 98.9%
  - Coloured: 0.6%
  - Indian/Asian: 0.4%
  - Other: 0.2%

First languages (2011)
  - Tswana: 88.0%
  - English: 3.0%
  - S. Ndebele: 1.7%
  - Zulu: 1.4%
  - Other: 5.9%
- Time zone: UTC+2 (SAST)
- Area code: 053

Mothibistad is a town situated 9 kilometres (6 mi) northeast of Kuruman in the Northern Cape province of South Africa. Before 1994 it was in the Bophuthatswana bantustan, and from 1994 until a border change in 2006 it was in North West province. According to the census of 2011 it had a population of 9,616, of whom 99% described themselves as Black African and 88% spoke Tswana as a first language. It falls within the Ga-Segonyana Local Municipality and the John Taolo Gaetsewe District Municipality.
