= Atelura valencianica =

Scientific classification
- Domain: Eukaryota
- Kingdom: Animalia
- Phylum: Arthropoda
- Class: Insecta
- Order: Zygentoma
- Family: Nicoletiidae
- Genus: Atelura
- Species: A. valencianica

Binomial name
- Atelura valencianica Molero, Gaju, Bach & Mendes, 1998

Species of insect

Atelura valencianica is a species of nicoletiid in the family Nicoletiidae.
