= Protrinemuroides =

Scientific classification
- Domain: Eukaryota
- Kingdom: Animalia
- Phylum: Arthropoda
- Class: Insecta
- Order: Zygentoma
- Family: Protrinemuridae
- Genus: Protrinemuroides; Mendes, 2002

Genus of silverfishes

Protrinemuroides is a genus of silverfish in the family Protrinemuridae. It only comprises the type species Protrinemuroides celebicus Mendes, 2002, found on the Indonesian island of Sulawesi.
