= Texoreddellia =

Scientific classification
- Domain: Eukaryota
- Kingdom: Animalia
- Phylum: Arthropoda
- Class: Insecta
- Order: Zygentoma
- Family: Nicoletiidae
- Genus: Texoreddellia; Wygodzinsky, 1973
- Species: T. texensis

Binomial name
- Texoreddellia texensis (Ulrich, 1902)

Genus of silverfishes

Texoreddellia is a genus of nicoletiids in the family Nicoletiidae, containing one described species, Texoreddellia texensis.
