= Francis Thackeray (palaeontologist) =

South African paleontologist and anthropologist

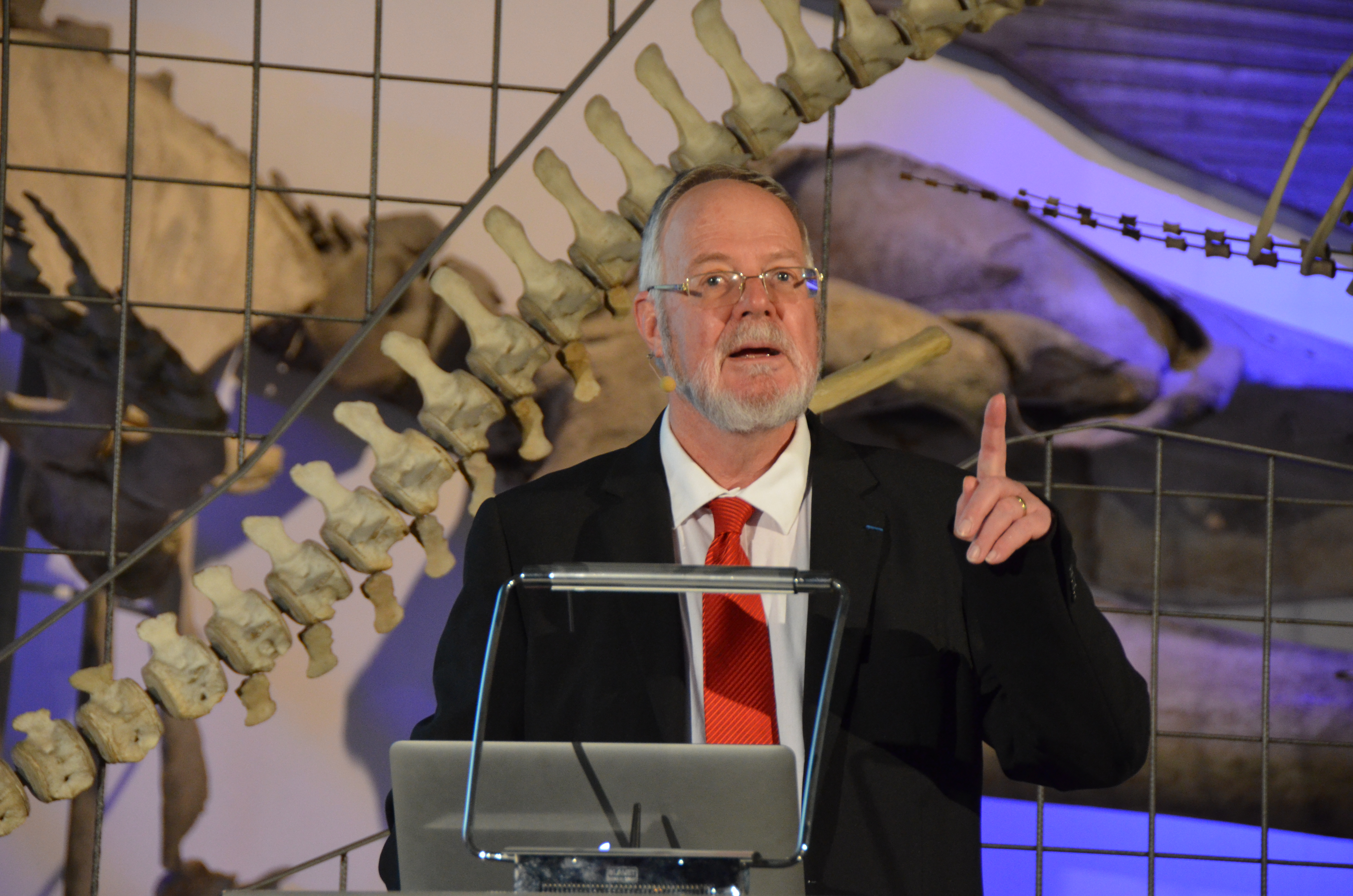
- Francis Thackeray delivering the Koenigswald Lecture 2016 at the Senckenberg Natural History Museum
- Born: John Francis Thackeray; 21 November 1952 (age 73); Pretoria, Union of South Africa
- Occupations: paleontologist anthropologist

Academic background
- Education: St Alban’s College
- Alma mater: University of Cape Town; Yale University
- Thesis: Man, animals and extinctions: the analysis of Holocene faunal remains from Wonderwerk Cave, South Africa. (1984)
- Doctoral advisor: Irving Rouse

John Francis Thackeray (born 21 November 1952 in Pretoria, South Africa) is a retired South African paleontologist and anthropologist, most recently active at the University of the Witwatersrand.

== Life ==
J. Francis Thackeray (as he is usually referred to in academic papers) initially studied zoology (Bachelor 's degree 1974) and archaeology (Bachelor's degree 1975) at the University of Cape Town in South Africa. In 1977, he completed his studies in Cape Town with a Master of Science (M.Sc.) degree in environmental science. He then moved to the USA to Yale University, where he earned another Master's degree in 1979 and a Ph.D. in anthropology in 1984. His doctoral dissertation on fossil plants from the Late Pleistocene was titled: "Man, animals and extinctions: the analysis of Holocene faunal remains from Wonderwerk Cave, South Africa."

After returning to South Africa, he initially worked as a researcher at Stellenbosch University (1982–1988) and then at the University of Cape Town until 1990. From 1990, Thackeray headed the paleontology department at the Transvaal Museum (now the Ditsong National Museum of Natural History), ultimately serving as its director until 2009. From 2009 until the reorganization of the field in 2013, he was a professor and head of the Institute for Human Evolution at the University of the Witwatersrand in Johannesburg, which had been founded in 2004. Since its merger with the Bernard Price Institute for Palaeontological Research, he has held the Phillip Tobias Chair of Paleoanthropology at the Institute for Evolutionary Research at the University of the Witwatersrand.

Due to his collaboration with French colleagues within the framework of the Human Origins and Past Environments programme (HOPE) which he led, Thackeray was appointed Chevalier (Knight) of the French Ordre national du Mérite in 1998.

== Research topics ==
Besides paleoanthropological excavations, Thackeray's particular interest lay primarily in theoretical anatomical problems that currently arise in the field of paleoanthropology from the lack of fixed (statistical) criteria for defining pre-human species (the australopithecines) and early human species (for example, Homo ergaster / Homo erectus / Homo heidelbergensis). "In this context, he developed fundamentally new approaches to the analysis and evaluation of morphological criteria in the evolutionary history of humankind." His "statistical species concept" is based on the pairwise comparison of as many quantifiable anatomical features as possible from as many skulls of the same species as possible. For each feature, a mean and a standard deviation can then be calculated. These data can be related to similarly collected data from a second species, thus determining the morphological proximity or distance between the two species. His calculations showed, among other things, that Australopithecus africanus and Homo erectus exhibit only minor morphological differences and can therefore be interpreted as chronospecies. His approach also influenced the recognition of Australopithecus sediba, named in 2010, as a distinct species.

== Dedication name ==
In 2019, the Italian paleontologist Marco Pavia named the fossil ibis species Geronticus thackerayi in honor of John Francis Thackeray.

== Writings ==
- Man, animals and extinctions: the analysis of Holocene faunal remains from Wonderwerk Cave, South Africa. Dissertation, Yale University, Ann Arbor 1984 (University Microfilms International).
- Probabilities of conspecificity. In: Nature. Band 390, 1997, S. 30–31, doi:10.1038/36240
- with various co-authors:: Probabilities of conspecificity: application of a morphometric technique to modern taxa and fossil specimens attributed to Australopithecus and Homo. In: South African Journal of Science. Band 93, 1997, S. 195–196, Volltext (PDF)
- Approximation of a biological species constant ? In: South African Journal of Science. Band 103, Nr. 11–12, 2007, S. 489, Volltext
- Homo sapiens helmei from Florisbad, South Africa. In: The Digging Stick. Band 27, Nr. 3, 2010, S. 13–14, Volltext (PDF)
- with: Zachary Cofran: One or two species? A morphometric comparison between robust australopithecines from Kromdraai and Swartkrans. In: South African Journal of Science. Band 106, Nr. 1/2, 2010, Art.#15, 4 pages, doi:10.4102/sajs.v106i1/2.15
- with K. Houghton: Morphometric comparisons between crania of Late Pleistocene Homo sapiens from Border Cave (BC 1), Tuinplaas (TP 1) and modern southern African populations. In: Transactions of the Royal Society of South Africa. Band 66, Nr. 3, 2011, doi:10.1080/0035919X.2011.626808
- with Edward Odes: Morphometric analysis of Early Pleistocene African hominin crania in the context of a statistical (probabilistic) definition of a species. In: Antiquity. Band 87, 2013, Volltext
- Der Mensch ist schwer zu greifen. In: Frankfurter Allgemeine Zeitung. Nr. 274, 23. November 2016, S. N2
