= Weber's myotis =

Conservation status
- Data Deficient (IUCN 3.1)

Scientific classification
- Kingdom: Animalia
- Phylum: Chordata
- Class: Mammalia
- Order: Chiroptera
- Family: Vespertilionidae
- Genus: Myotis
- Species: M. weberi

Binomial name
- Myotis weberi (Jentink, 1890)

Synonyms
- Kerivoula weberi Myotis formosus weberi

Species of vesper bat

Weber's myotis (Myotis weberi) is a species of vesper bat endemic to the Indonesian island of Sulawesi.

== Taxonomy ==
It was described in 1890 as a distinct species by Fredericus Anna Jentink, but later reclassified as conspecific with or as a subspecies of Hodgson's bat (M. formosus). However, a 2014 morphological study found major divergence between M. formosus and M. weberi, and thus split them from one another. This has also been followed by the American Society of Mammalogists, the IUCN Red List, and the ITIS.

It was named after Max Carl Wilhelm Weber.

== Distribution and habitat ==
It is endemic to Indonesia, where it is only found on the island of Sulawesi. It inhabits primary and secondary tropical forest, likely with some resilience to human habitat degradation.

== Status ==
This species is only known from four museum specimens, and thus extremely little is known about it. It may be threatened by logging of lowland forest, which it is likely closely associated with. However, very little is known about this species, and is thus classified as Data Deficient by the IUCN Red List.
