= Protrinemurella =

Scientific classification
- Domain: Eukaryota
- Kingdom: Animalia
- Phylum: Arthropoda
- Class: Insecta
- Order: Zygentoma
- Family: Protrinemuridae
- Genus: Protrinemurella; Mendes, 2002

Genus of silverfishes

Protrinemurella is a genus of silverfish in the family Protrinemuridae. It comprises only the type species Protrinemurella allacrotelsoides Mendes, 2002, known from Thailand's Krabi province.
