= Geronticus thackerayi =

Geronticus thackerayi Temporal range: Piacenzian–Gelasian

Scientific classification
- Kingdom: Animalia
- Phylum: Chordata
- Class: Aves
- Order: Pelecaniformes
- Family: Threskiornithidae
- Genus: Geronticus
- Species: †G. thackerayi

Binomial name
- †Geronticus thackerayi Pavia, 2019

Extinct ibis species

Geronticus thackerayi is an extinct species of Geronticus that lived in Africa during the Pliocene-Pleistocene transition. It is named after the palaeontologist Francis Thackeray.

== Distribution ==
Geronticus thackerayi is known from fossils discovered in the Kromdraai fossil site of Gauteng, South Africa.
