= Trinemophora =

Scientific classification
- Domain: Eukaryota
- Kingdom: Animalia
- Phylum: Arthropoda
- Class: Insecta
- Order: Zygentoma
- Family: Protrinemuridae
- Genus: Trinemophora; Schaeffer, 1897

Genus of silverfishes

Trinemophora is a genus of silverfish in the family Protrinemuridae. Four species are currently known, two of them being Trinemophora schaefferi (Silvestri, 1905) from Chile and Trinemophora bitschiana (Wygodzinsky, 1959) from Turkey.
