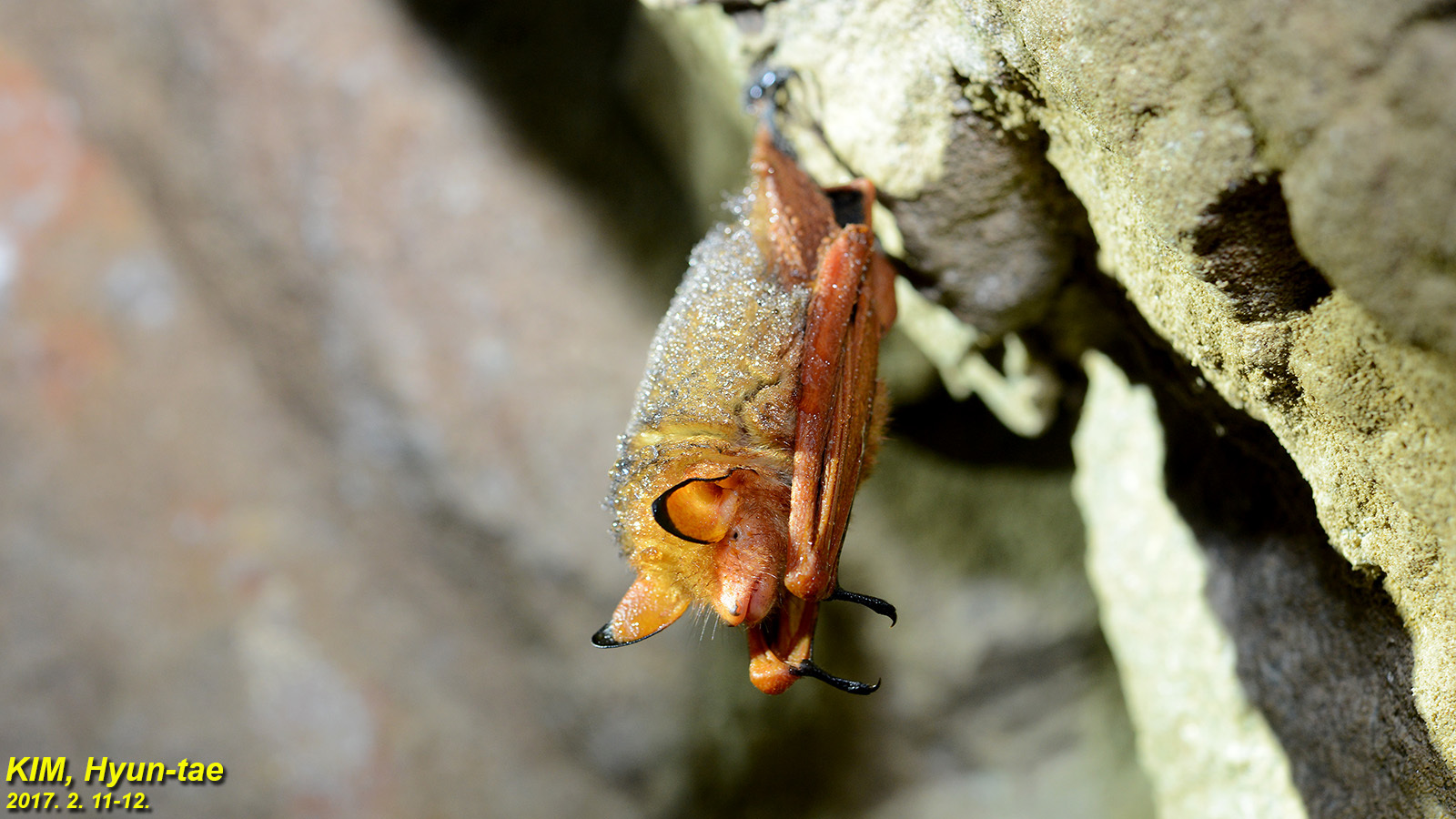
- In Yeongam, South Korea

Conservation status
- Least Concern (IUCN 3.1)

Scientific classification
- Kingdom: Animalia
- Phylum: Chordata
- Class: Mammalia
- Order: Chiroptera
- Family: Vespertilionidae
- Genus: Myotis
- Species: M. rufoniger

Binomial name
- Myotis rufoniger (Tomes, 1858)
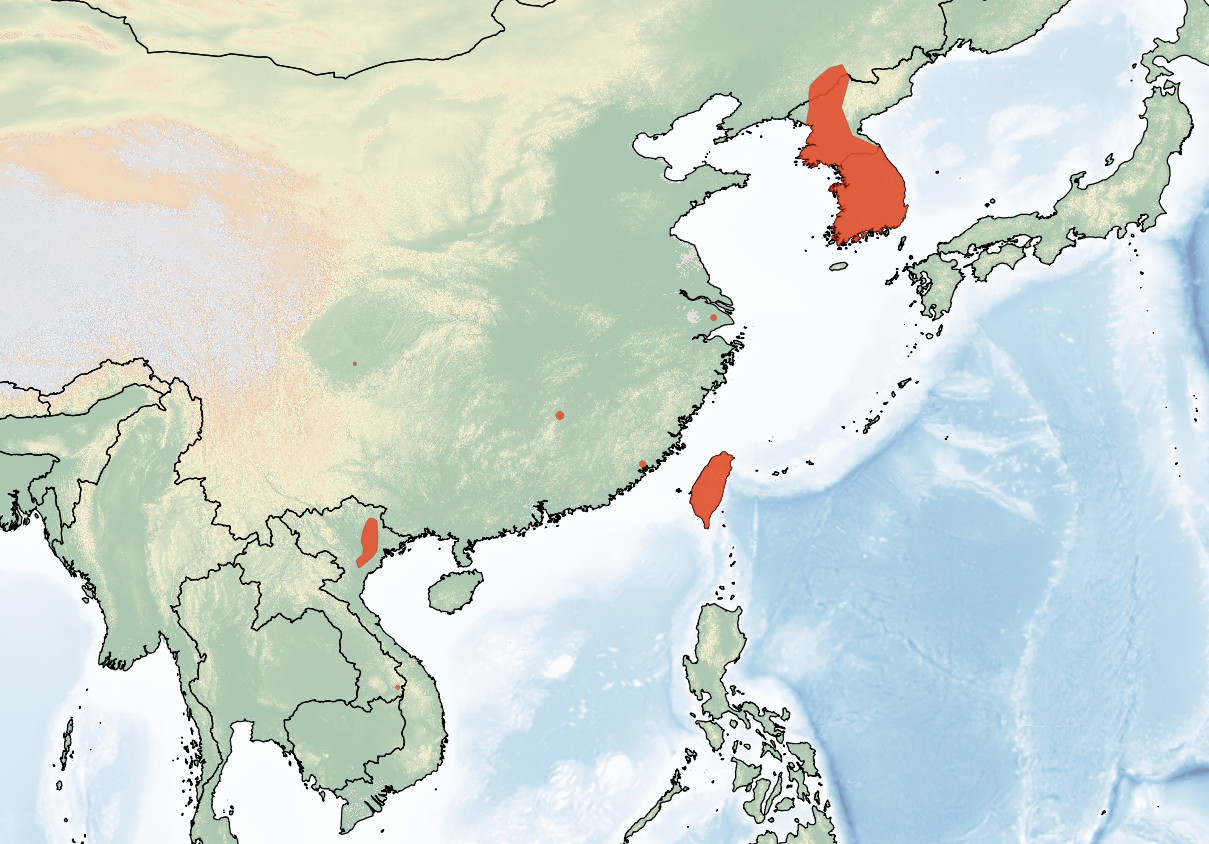

Synonyms
- Myotis formosus rufoniger

= Reddish-black myotis =

Species of bat

The reddish-black myotis or black-winged myotis (Myotis rufoniger), colloquially known as the "red bat" or "golden bat" (not to be confused with Lasiurus species, also known as red bats, or Mimon bennettii, also known as the golden bat) in South Korea, is a species of vesper bat found throughout East Asia.

== Taxonomy ==
It was initially described as a distinct species by Robert Fisher Tomes in 1858, but later studies reclassified as conspecific with Hodgson's bat (M. formosus). However, a 2014 morphological study found major divergence between M. formosus and M. rufoniger, and thus split them from one another. Creating a phylogeny based on wing patterns, the study found M. rufoniger to be most closely related to Welwitsch's bat (M. welwitschii) of Africa, rather than to M. formosus. This has also been followed by the American Society of Mammalogists, the IUCN Red List, and the ITIS.

A 2017 genetic study found M. rufoniger to have a low effective population size, being the lowest of the four Myotis species sampled for the study. The study found its effective population size to have peaked during the late Pleistocene, about 50,000 years ago, and to have dramatically decreased since the Last Glacial Maximum, reaching its lowest level in the present day.

== Distribution and habitat ==
It is thought to have a spotty but wide range across eastern Asia, ranging from Vietnam & Laos north through China, east to Taiwan, and north to the Korean peninsula. It has also been recorded on Tsushima Island in Japan. This species has been recorded from montane forests in Korea and Taiwan, and in subtropical forests in Vietnam. It is thought to roost in caves in at least part of its distribution area.

=== In Korea ===
In South Korea, this species is protected and designated a natural monument (monument number 452). It is one of the most well-known and iconic protected animals of South Korea. An exhibition center for the species exists in Hampyeong County, which, in addition to an exhibition hall, also displays a sculpture of the species made of 162 kg of pure gold, referencing the discovery of a colony of over 162 bats in a nearby cave.

== Status ==
Some populations of this species are thought to be cave-dwellers, and thus they may threatened by disturbance of caves. As they forage in forests, and some populations also roost in them, they may also be threatened by logging. Due to its conspicuous coloration, individuals of this species may be at risk of being captured and used as ornaments. However, this species has a wide range across East Asia and is thought to have some degree of tolerance to habitat modification, so it is classified as Least Concern on the IUCN Red List.
