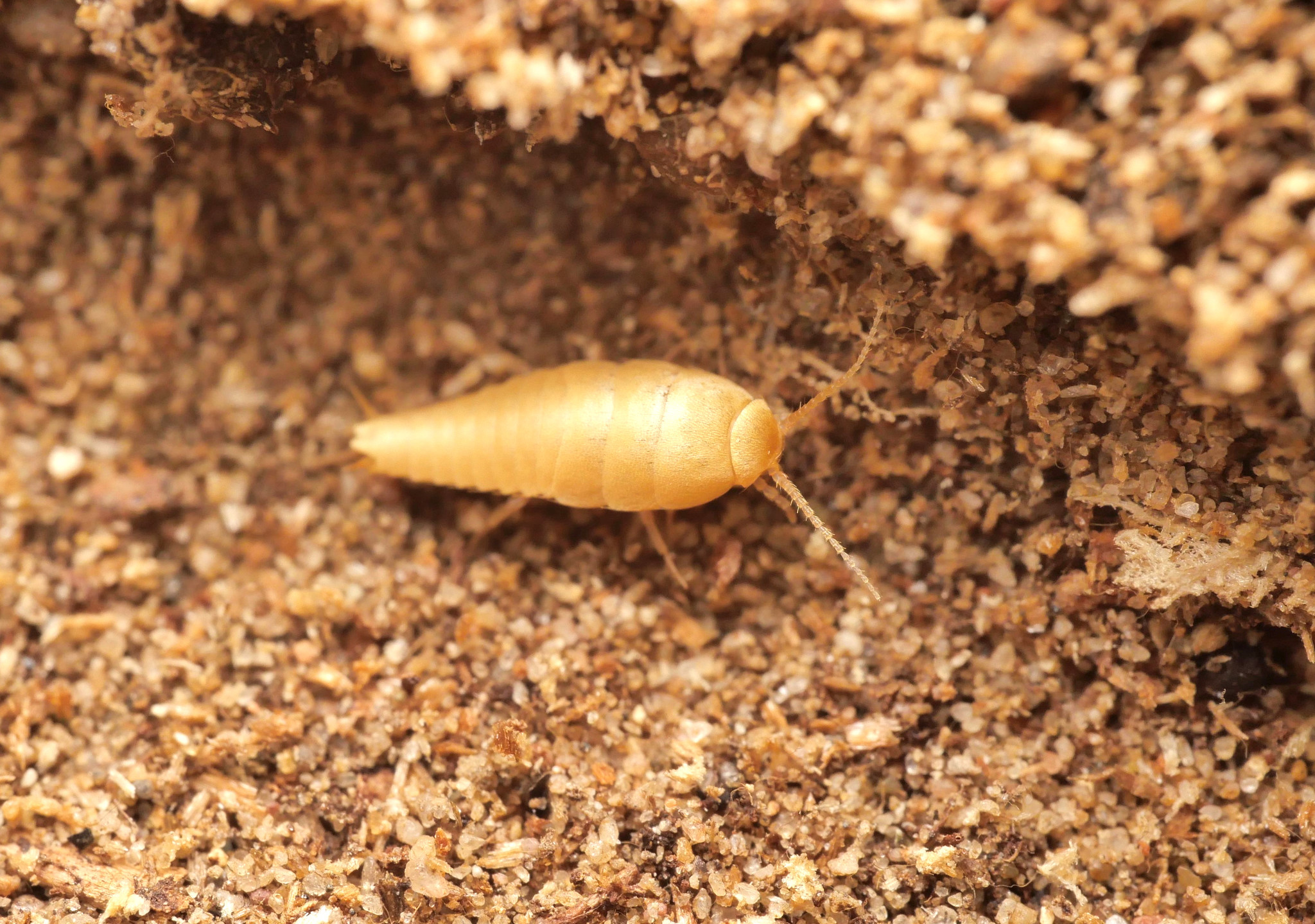
- Atelura formicaria

Scientific classification
- Domain: Eukaryota
- Kingdom: Animalia
- Phylum: Arthropoda
- Class: Insecta
- Order: Zygentoma
- Family: Nicoletiidae
- Subfamily: Atelurinae; Remington, 1954

Diversity
- About 70 genera 140 species

= Atelurinae =

Subfamily of insects

Atelurinae is a subfamily of primitive insects belonging to the order Zygentoma. Once considered an independent family, it is now treated as a subfamily within the Nicoletiidae. They are generally found in association with ants or termites, living as inquilines in the hosts' nests. They are typically small, tear-drop or sub-ovoid in body shape, light yellow in color and lacking eyes. The subfamily is quite diverse, with more than 140 described species in about 70 genera; many of the genera are monotypic.
