= Prosthecina =

Scientific classification
- Domain: Eukaryota
- Kingdom: Animalia
- Phylum: Arthropoda
- Class: Insecta
- Order: Zygentoma
- Family: Nicoletiidae
- Genus: Prosthecina; Silvestri, 1933

Genus of silverfishes

Prosthecina is a genus of nicoletiids in the family Nicoletiidae.
