= Isinuka Mud Caves and Sulphur Pools =

Archaeological site

- Map of the Eastern Cape with Port St Johns highlighted
- Interactive map of Isinuka Mud Caves and Sulphur Pools
- 31°36′29.38″S 29°28′53.87″E
- Cultures: Pondo people, Xhosa people
- Location: Isinuka village in Port St. Johns OR Tambo District Municipality
- Region: Eastern Cape, South Africa

Site notes
- Material: mud, clay

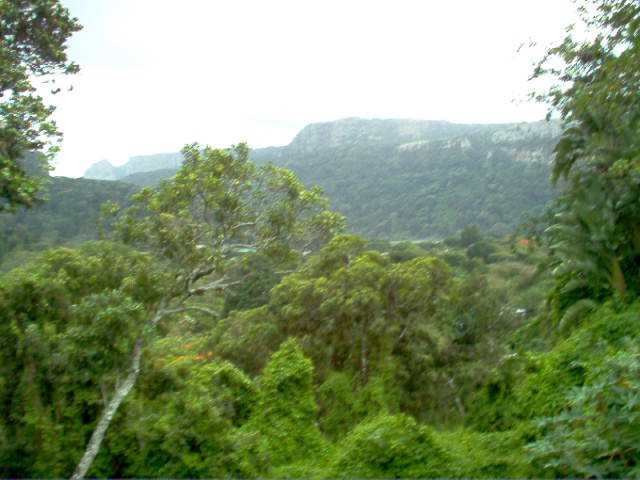
Forest of Port St John's where the Isinuka caves and Springs are situated

The Isinuka Mud Caves and Sulphur Pools are located next to the Isinuka village which is located in OR Tambo District Municipality, Eastern Cape, South Africa. The name "Isinuka", means "place of smell", which refers to the odour of the sulfur which diffuses from the springs. This name was given by the Mpondo people of the Eastern Cape who regard this site as a sacred area. The springs are also visited by thousands of tourists who seek relief from various ailments yearly.

== Uses ==
The white soil clay from the springs is used for cosmetic and dermatological applications by the people of Isinuka, Port St Johns and the surrounding towns in Pondoland of the Eastern Cape province. The presence of sulfur, copper and zinc may play a significant role in their antibacterial and antifungal properties. The clays are particularly used by local women to protect their skin from the ultra violet rays. The presence of zinc oxide and TiO_{2} are likely responsible for protection against the sun. The minor presence of arsenic also aids in healing properties however, arsenic is a human carcinogen and may be extremely toxic at high concentrations.

== Description ==
The springs are located in a densely forested region a few kilometers from Port St John's. In order to reach the pure spring water, the people need to climb large rocks and use a strong fig tree as an improvised staircase. The Isinuka cave is below a rock outcrop and water drips from the roof of the cave onto a slippery white clayey sedimentary material, which is the material used for the treatment of skin diseases such as acne. The most popular pond like spring (which is about 3 square meters) is located above the rock outcrop. The spring emits a foul smelling hydrogen sulfide odor. The water is turbid and dark grey in colour.

== Mineralogical and biochemical properties ==
Analytical sample studies have been done using X-ray diffraction techniques.

The pH range of samples range between 7.94 and 10.05 which indicates alkaline clay. The pH of normal human skin ranges between 5.4 and 5.9, this variability brings into the question the viability of using these clays to treat acne as highly alkaline substances often have an adverse effect on the skin when applied without premedication or neutralization. Additionally, Cutibacterium acnes, bacteria which play a role in the development of acne, thrives on skin with high alkalinity. Therefore, the continuous application of alkaline clay on skin will increase the skin pH resulting in the development of acne. The local people often mix these clay materials with other plant and animal extracts in order to make the clay suitable for application to the skin.

The particle sizes vary between silt, loam and silt loam. Large particle sizes when used cosmetically, may cause abrasion and damage to the skin. The smaller particles have a large potential to be used as a cleanser. The clays and soils particle size influences the refractive index (light) which allows for them to be used a s skin protectors.

There are 17 minerals identified in Isinuka clay namely quartz (SiO_{2}), mica, calcite (CaCO_{3}), interstratified illite (K,H_{3}O)(Al,Mg,Fe)_{2}(Si,Al)_{4}O_{10}[(OH)_{2}·(H_{2}O)], aragonite (CaCO_{3}), gypsum CaSO_{4}.2(H_{2}O), rozenite Fe^{2+}SO_{4}.4(H_{2}O), K-feldspar (KAlSi_{3}O_{8}), plagioclase (Na,Ca)(Si,Al)_{4}O_{8}), kaolinite (Al_{2}SiO_{5}(OH)_{4}), chlorite, halite (NaCl), pyrite (FeS_{2}), pyrophyllite (Al_{2}Ai_{4}O_{10}(OH)_{2}), spinel (MgAl_{2}O_{4}) and smectite (NaO_{3}(Al,Mg)_{2}SiO_{10}(OH)_{2}·H_{2}O). The three dominant mineral phases are quartz, mica and calcite followed by interstratified illite and smectite. The alkaline nature of the clay can be attributed to calcite. Quartz, mica and illite are very stable substances however, due to their particle size, can cause abrasions when applied topically. Illite is applied topically and orally.

The use of sulfur in various skin preparations in the field of dermatology due to sulfur's antifungal, antibacterial and keratolytic properties. The sulfur content in the springs ranges from 0.8% to 1.3%. Furthermore, the continued saturation of the sulfur containing clay with the saline water which drips from the roof of the cave results in an improvement in medicinal properties of the clay. The clay also has components which include bromide and arsenic, the latter was used to treat syphilis, yaws and other bacterial infections before the development of penicillin. Other trace elements found include cobalt, chromium, copper, zinc, uranium and radioactive strontium.

Although the clay may be useful for therapeutic and cosmetic purposes, the clay may also constitute a health risk resulting from repeated and unsupervised exposure. There are however, no toxicological studies yet done to identify appropriate beneficial methods to make the clay safer to use.

== Traditional beliefs ==
The sulfur is used to cure stomach and skin ailments. The thick mud and bubbling water is believed to contain chemicals which are capable of curing all ailments. The people of Isinuka and surrounding villages believe that the clay is a gift which has been passed down from their ancestors therefore the cessation of the use of the water and clay from the springs is unlikely.

== See also ==
- Sacred caves of the Basotho
