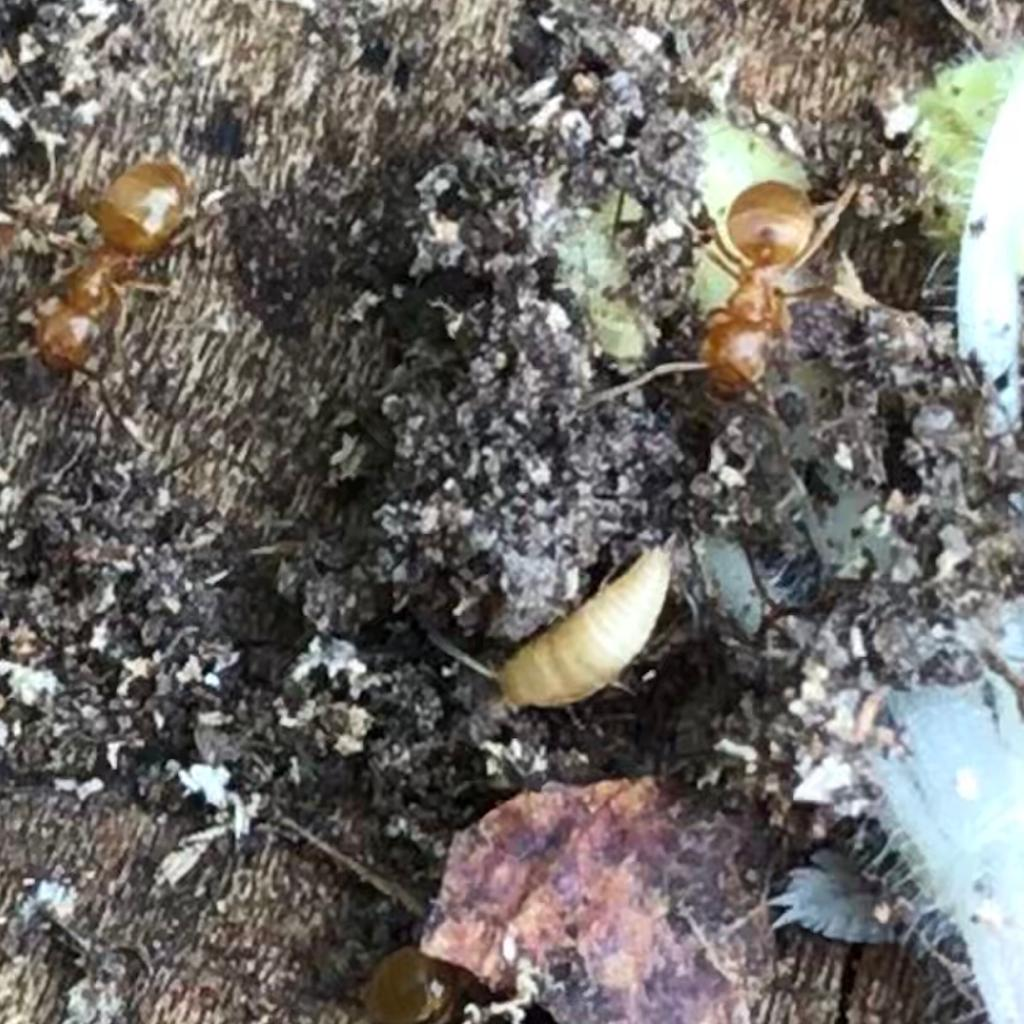

Scientific classification
- Domain: Eukaryota
- Kingdom: Animalia
- Phylum: Arthropoda
- Class: Insecta
- Order: Zygentoma
- Family: Nicoletiidae
- Genus: Atelura
- Species: A. formicaria

Binomial name
- Atelura formicaria Heyden, 1855

= Atelura formicaria =

Species of insect

Atelura formicaria is a species of nicoletiid in the family Nicoletiidae.
