= Anelpistina =

Scientific classification
- Kingdom: Animalia
- Phylum: Arthropoda
- Class: Insecta
- Order: Zygentoma
- Family: Nicoletiidae
- Genus: Anelpistina; Silvestri, 1905

Species
- See text

Synonyms
- Cubacubana Wygodzinsky & Hollinger, 1977; Neonicoletia Paclt, 1979

Genus of silverfishes

Nicoletia is a genus of silverfish in the family Nicoletiidae. As of 2007, it contains the former members of two other genera.

== Species ==
- Anelpistina acanthocruris Espinasa & Fisher, 2005
- Anelpistina anophtalma (Bilimek, 1867)
- Anelpistina ariasae Espinasa, 2005
- Anelpistina arubana (Mendes, 1986)
- Anelpistina asymmetrica (Espinasa, 2000)
- Anelpistina bolivari (Wygodzinsky, 1946)
- Anelpistina boneti (Wygodzinsky, 1946)
- Anelpistina carrizalensis (Wygodzinsky, 1946)
- Anelpistina cuaxilotla Espinasa, 1999
- Anelpistina decui (Wygodzinsky & Hollinger, 1977)
- Anelpistina doradoi Espinasa & Alpheis, 2001
- Anelpistina inappendicata Espinasa, 1999
- Anelpistina mexicana (Espinasa, 1992)
- Anelpistina miranda (Silvestri, 1902)
- Anelpistina negreai (Wygodzinsky & Hollinger, 1977)
- Anelpistina parkerae (Espinasa & Rishmawi, 2005)
- Anelpistina puertoricensis Espinasa & Alpheis, 2003
- Anelpistina quinterensis (Paclt, 1979)
- Anelpistina ramosi (Wygodzinsky, 1959)
- Anelpistina ruckeri (Silvestri, 1905)
- Anelpistina spelaea (Galan, 2000)
- Anelpistina weyrauchi (Wygodzinsky, 1959)
- Anelpistina wheeleri (Silvestri, 1905)
