= Wonderwerk Cave =

Archaeological site in South Africa

- location in South Africa
- 27°50′42″S 23°33′14″E
- Location: Kuruman Hills between Danielskuil and Kuruman
- Region: South Africa

Site notes
- Excavation dates: 1940s ongoing
- Archaeologists: B.D. Malan, Peter B. Beaumont, Karl W. Butzer, Anne Thackeray & Francis Thackeray

Wonderwerk Cave is an archaeological site, formed originally as an ancient solution cavity in dolomite rocks of the Kuruman Hills, situated between Danielskuil and Kuruman in the Northern Cape Province, South Africa. It is a National Heritage Site, managed as a satellite of the McGregor Museum in Kimberley. Geologically, hillside erosion exposed the northern end of the cavity, which extends horizontally for about 140 m (460 ft) into the base of a hill. Accumulated deposits inside the cave, up to 7 m (23 ft) in-depth, reflect natural sedimentation processes such as water and wind deposition as well as the activities of animals, birds, and human ancestors over some 2 million years. The site has been studied and excavated by archaeologists since the 1940s and research here generates important insights into human history in the subcontinent of Southern Africa. Evidence within Wonderwerk cave has been called the oldest controlled fire. A 2026 study revealed evidence that early humans used fire in South Africa's Wonderwerk Cave between 1.07 and 1.79 million years ago, pushing back the known timeline by hundreds of thousands of years, indicating that early hominins likely harvested and maintained natural wildfires within the cave rather than creating fire on demand.

Wonderwerk means "miracle" in the Afrikaans language.

== Archaeological sequence ==
Hominin timeline
← / Earlier apes; ← / Gorilla split; ← / Chimpanzee split; ← / Earliest bipedal; ← / Earliest sign of Ardipithecus; ← / Earliest sign of Australopithecus; ← / Earliest stone tools; ← / Earliest sign of Homo; ← / Dispersal beyond Africa; ← / Earliest fire / cooking; ← / Earliest rock art; ← / Earliest clothes; ← / Modern humans
(million years ago)

The cave contains up to 6 m (20 ft) depth of archaeological deposits reflecting human and environmental history through the Earlier, Middle and Later Stone Ages to the present. Cosmogenic dating suggests that basal sediment entered the cave some 2 million years ago.

Rock art occurs in the form of parietal paintings within the first 40 m (130 ft) from the entrance, possibly all less than 1000 years old, and small engraved stones found within the deposit, mainly from the Later Stone Age sequence where they date back some 10,500 years. The associations of older engraved or striated pieces have yet to be substantiated.

== Fertiliser extraction ==
Major damage was caused in the 1940s when local farmers dug up large parts of the cave interior to bag and sell organic-rich material as fertiliser – which in fact comprised stratified archaeological deposits containing artifacts, bone and other material that would have been crucial to an understanding of the cultural and palaeoenvironmental history of the site. The presence of bone was reported upon, leading to the first archaeological and zooarchaeological investigations.

== Archaeological investigations ==
The initial archaeological studies of the 1940s, by Malan, Cooke and Wells, were followed up briefly by K.W. Butzer in the 1970s. Peter Beaumont of the McGregor Museum in Kimberley then carried out major excavations at the site between 1978 and 1993, with Anne Thackeray and Francis Thackeray working at the site in 1979, excavating and researching the Later Stone Age levels from cultural and archaeozoological perspectives respectively. Work led by Michael Chazan of the University of Toronto, Liora Kolska Horwitz of The Hebrew University and Francesco Berna of Simon Fraser University, in collaboration with the McGregor Museum (where excavated assemblages are housed), was carried out from around 2008. A digital model of the site was created by laser scanning, forming part of the Zamani Project. Key team members who have worked on the dating of the lower units are the late Hagai Ron (magnetostratigraphic or palaeomagnetic dating), Ari Matmon (cosmogenic isotope dating), Robyn Pickering (U/Pb dating) and Naomi Porat (Optically stimulated luminescence dating). Results of these archaeological, dating, sedimentological and palaeoenvironmental studies were first reported at a symposium convened by Chazan and Horwitz at the site. They have since been published in a series of papers, and in a special issue on the site published in 2015. In April 2021, archaeologists from the University of Toronto and the Hebrew University announced the results of magnetostratigraphy and cosmogenic dating of the cave. According to the paper published in the journal Quaternary Science Reviews, making of the simple Oldowan tools and finding of animal bones from the 2.5-metre (8 ft 2 in) thick sedimentary layer inside prove that this cave was occupied by Early Stone Age humans about 2 million years ago.

== Palaeoenvironmental investigations ==
The sediments within the cave exhibit exceptional preservation of organic remains including macro-botanical remains, phytoliths and micro and macro-fauna which shed light inter alia on species extinctions relative to the end of the last ice age circa 10 000 years ago – studied by Francis Thackeray. Margaret Avery and Yolanda Fernandez-Jalvo are studying the small mammal remains introduced to the cave sediments as part of the contents of owl droppings and which provide indications as to the palaeenvironmental conditions outside the cave.

Also preserved are pollen, another key source of information on changing environmental conditions outside the cave, currently studied by Louis Scott but initially examined by E.M. van Zinderen Bakker. Lloyd Rossouw is researching phytoliths from the cave, which show changing vegetation profiles, while preserved charcoal is being studied by Marion Bamford to generate data on woody plants.

Deposition processes have been the focus of work by Karl Butzer and, currently, Paul Goldberg and Francesco Berna.

== Ritual uses ==
Indications of the cave's contemporary social or ritual significance relate inter alia to the occasional collecting of water, by local African people, for healing purposes. There are other nearby sites where beliefs concerning the ritual power of water (associations with a mythic watersnake are remarked upon), for example by members of the Zion Christian Church, include the Kuruman Eye and Boesmanspit.

The past ritual significance of the site is subject to on-going archaeological investigation.

=== Rock paintings ===
The rock art on the walls of the cave near its entrance, being researched by David Morris and engraved stones found in the deposit may implicate changing ritual significance.

=== The deep interior as ritual space ===
Aspects of the use of the cave's deep interior reaches are also being considered in these terms. Chazan and Horwitz refer, as Beaumont had done, to the introduction of manuports (unmodified natural stones) "with special sensory properties" by terminal Acheulean hominins, more than 180,000 years ago, to the deep interior of the cave which is characterized by "singular acoustic and visual qualities." They argue that the site provides a "unique and extensive diachronic record of milestones in the development of symbolic behavior" and "evidence to support the position that elements of symbolic behaviour emerged long before the dispersal of modern humans out of Africa."

== Wonderwerk Cave in literature ==
- Julia Martin devotes a chapter to Wonderwerk Cave in her book A Millimetre of Dust, the title of which was inspired by a remark about the site.
- Michael Cope's anthology Ghaap has sonnets inspired by Wonderwerk Cave.

== Heritage status ==
Wonderwerk Cave, within a servitude ceded to the McGregor Museum, was declared a National Monument of South Africa in 1993. It was opened to the public, as a site museum, in 1993. In the same year a major graffiti-removal project was carried out. In 2000 new legislation made the site a Provincial Heritage Site. Between 2003 and 2009 it was assessed in terms of the grading system prescribed by the National Heritage Resources Act and graded as a Grade I site (i.e.: of national significance). Declaration as a National Heritage Site followed, being published in the Government Gazette on 12 March 2010. Coupled in a serial nomination with Border Cave and Klasies River Mouth for South Africa's Tentative List for World Heritage inscription, it was re-nominated in its own right for the Tentative List in April 2009.

Wonderwerk Cave was one of the 100 sites selected for the 2010 World Monuments Watch by the World Monuments Fund.

== Documentation with 3D laser scanner ==
In 2005, the Zamani Project documented the Wonderwerk Cave in 3D. A 3D model, panorama tour, images of the point cloud, sections and plans are available on www.zamaniproject.org.

== See also ==
- Kogelbeen Cave
