= Kuruman =

- Town
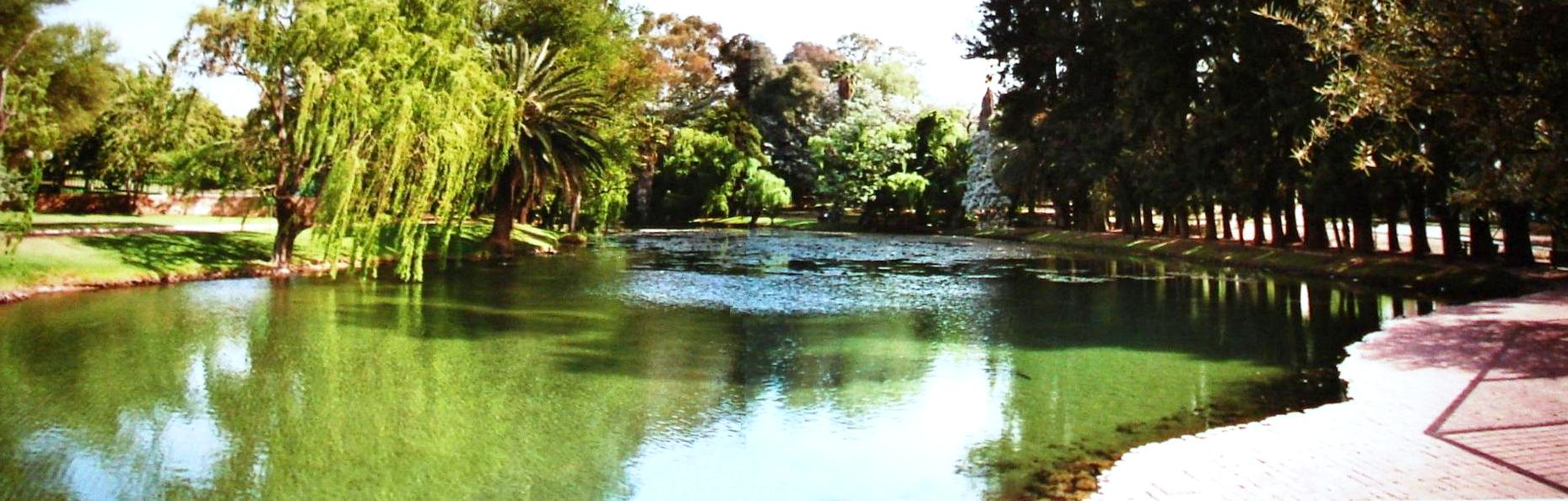
- The Eye

- Location within Northern Cape Location within South Africa Location within Africa
- Coordinates: 27°27′S 23°26′E
- Country: South Africa
- Province: Northern Cape
- District: John Taolo Gaetsewe
- Municipality: Ga-Segonyana
- Established: 1887; 139 years ago

Area
  - Total: 93.39 km^{2} (36.06 sq mi)

Population (2011)
  - Total: 13,057
  - Density: 139.8/km^{2} (362.1/sq mi)

Racial makeup (2011)
  - Black African: 43.7%
  - Coloured: 23.5%
  - Indian/Asian: 1.3%
  - White: 30.3%
  - Other: 1.2%

First languages (2011)
  - Afrikaans: 76.9%
  - Tswana: 14.9%
  - English: 4.0%
  - Other: 4.2%
- Time zone: UTC+2 (SAST)
- Postal code (street): 8460
- PO box: 8460
- Area code: 053

Kuruman is a small town in the Northern Cape province of South Africa. It is known for its scenery and the Eye of Kuruman, a geological feature that brings water from deep underground. The abundance of water produces an unexpected swathe of green amidst the barren plains and is known as the "Oasis of the Kalahari". It was at first a mission station of the London Missionary Society founded by Robert Moffat in 1821. It was also the place where David Livingstone arrived for his first position as a missionary in 1841. The Kuruman River, which is dry except for flash floods after heavy rain, is named after the town.

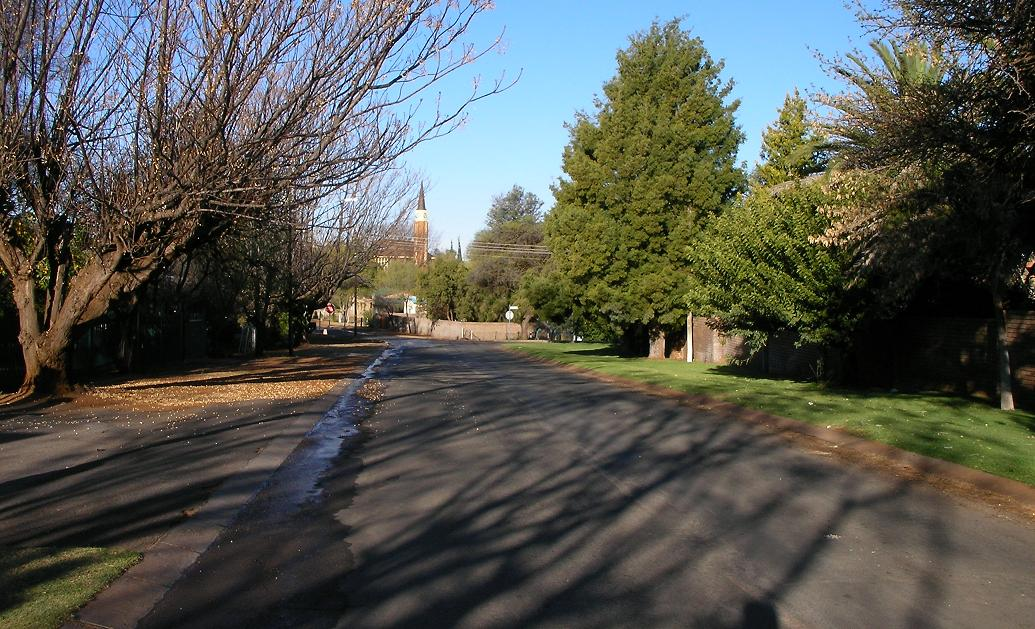
A residential street in Kuruman

== Origins ==
Kuruman is regarded as the "Oasis of the Kalahari". It is set out on the Ghaap Plateau and receives its water source from a spring called "The Eye" which rises in a cave in the semidesert thornveld area in the Kalahari region. Kuruman is the main town in the area and the spring gives about 20 to 30 million litres of water daily to approximately 10 000 inhabitants. It is also known as "Die Oog" or "Gasegonyane" in the Kalahari region.

The name Kuruman is derived from the Chief who lived in the area, named Kudumane. Robert Moffat, a missionary from the London Missionary Society, also lived there from 1820 to 1870. Moffat helped build the Moffat Church which was completed in 1838 and is still used for regular church services. While living in Kuruman, Moffat translated the bible into the Tswana language: this was the second bible in an indigenous southern African language.

== Location and climate ==
Kuruman is situated on the main route between Gauteng and Namibia/Cape Town via Upington. The route is growing in popularity because of its beautiful nature and various tourist attractions. Kuruman lies virtually on the edge of the Kalahari at the foot of a range of low hills. It has relatively mild weather patterns compared to other Northern Cape towns, such as Upington and Springbok, and is surrounded by more vegetation than Upington and Springbok, which are mostly semi-arid to desert environments.

== Economy ==
Mining and agriculture (cattle and game) support Kuruman's thriving economy. Minerals mined in Kuruman include manganese, iron ore, tiger's eye and crocidolite. The richest deposits of crocidolite in the world are found in the Kuruman district.

== Demographics ==
According to the 2001 census, Kuruman had a population of 9,824, of which 4,267 (43.4%) were Coloured, 3,549 (36.1%) were White and 1,969 (20.0%) were Black. The most spoken language at home was Afrikaans with a percentage of 80.68%, followed by Tswana language with 14.8%. Males make up 50.58% of the population and females, 49.42%.

== Notable residents and media ==
Kuruman was home to local author and Sanusi or Zulu traditional healer, Credo Mutwa.

Philip Hazel, the British computer programmer, emigrated to Kuruman with his family after WWII; his father worked in the offices of an asbestos-mining company.

The Kalahari Meerkat Project, made famous by the television series Meerkat Manor, is located nearby.

Kuruman is one of the more noted Peace Corps outposts in the northern regions of the country. From 2007 to 2009, it was home to former Peace Corps volunteer and published author and playwright Stefanie DeLeo.

== Attractions ==
=== The Eye of Kuruman ===
This is a natural fountain delivering approximately 20 to 30 million litres (4,400,000 to 6,600,000 imp gal; 5,300,000 to 7,900,000 US gal) of crystal clear water daily which supplies domestic water, feeds the Kuruman River and spills more water into two irrigation canals which are 7 kilometres (4.3 mi) in length. The Eye was claimed to have been discovered in 1801 and this led to the establishment of the mission station in the early 19th century. The Eye then came to be described as "The fountain of Christianity". It is the biggest natural fountain in the Southern Hemisphere. In the early years, Tswana people called this fountain Gasegonyane which means "small water calabash with bubbling water".

=== Other attractions ===
- Billy Duvenhage Nature Reserve
- Raptor Route
- Moffat Mission
- Truce Tree which dates back to the 1914 Rebellion
- Tswalu Kalahari Reserve – the country’s largest privately owned game reserve
- Bird Sanctuary – wetland area with grass, reeds and trees. There are about 115 species of birds.
- Wonderwerk Cave
- Kuruman Hiking Trail
- Kgalagadi Transfrontier Park – where one can experience mine excursions
- Boesmansgat sinkhole situated at Mount Carmel Farm. This cave is acclaimed the sixth deepest submerged cave in the world – also known as a sinkhole
- The Kalahari Meerkat Project, associated with the television series Meerkat Manor, is located nearby, in the Kuruman River Reserve.

== See also ==
- European exploration of Africa
- List of returned Peace Corps Volunteers
