= Ga-Segonyana Local Municipality =

Ga-Segonyana
- Local municipality
- Seal

- Location in the Northern Cape
- Coordinates: 27°40′S 23°30′E
- Country: South Africa
- Province: Northern Cape
- District: John Taolo Gaetsewe
- Seat: Kuruman
- Wards: 15

Government
  - Type: Municipal council
  - Mayor: Victor Makoke

Area
  - Total: 4,492 km^{2} (1,734 sq mi)

Population (2022)
  - Total: 117,454
  - Density: 26.15/km^{2} (67.72/sq mi)

Racial makeup (2011)
  - Black African: 92.3%
  - Coloured: 5.2%
  - Indian/Asian: 0.4%
  - White: 2.1%

First languages (2011)
  - Tswana: 79.2%
  - Afrikaans: 12.9%
  - English: 2.9%
  - Southern Ndebele: 1.0%
  - Other: 4%
- Time zone: UTC+2 (SAST)
- Municipal code: NC452

Ga-Segonyana Municipality (Tswana: Mmasepala wa Ga-Segonyana; Afrikaans: Ga-Segonyana Munisipaliteit) is a local municipality within the John Taolo Gaetsewe District Municipality, in the Northern Cape province of South Africa.

Segonyana is the Setswana name of a spring, commonly known as Eye of Kuruman.

== Main places ==
The 2001 census divided the municipality into the following main places:

Place	Code	Area (km^{2})	Population
Batlharo Ba Ga Motlhware	68101	459.53	37,270
Ga Mohana	38101	2.83	3,674
Gathlose	38103	498.52	116
Kudumane	68102	198.06	14,033
Kuruman Part 1	68103	32.22	0
Kuruman Part 2	38104	93.61	9,824
Mothibistad	68104	2.93	4,626
Remainder of the municipality	38102	3,197.71	849

== Demographics ==
According to the 2022 South African census, the municipality had a population of 117,454 people. Of these, 5.2% identified as "Coloured," 92.3% as "Black African," and 2.1% as "White."

== Politics ==
The municipal council consists of twenty-nine members elected by mixed-member proportional representation. Fifteen councillors are elected by first-past-the-post voting in fifteen wards, while the remaining fourteen are chosen from party lists so that the total number of party representatives is proportional to the number of votes received. In the election of 1 November 2021 the African National Congress (ANC) won a majority of seventeen seats on the council.

The following table shows the results of the election.

Ga-Segonyana local election, 1 November 2021
Party	Votes				Seats		
Party	Ward	List	Total	%	Ward	List	Total
African National Congress	11,702	12,233	23,935	55.5%	14	3	17
Economic Freedom Fighters	4,482	4,815	9,297	21.5%	0	7	7
Democratic Alliance	2,408	2,421	4,829	11.2%	1	2	3
Independent candidates	1,648	–	1,648	3.8%	0	–	0
South African Royal Kingdoms Organization	375	501	876	2.0%	0	1	1
Forum for Service Delivery	208	488	696	1.6%	0	1	1
Patriotic Alliance	242	361	603	1.4%	0	0	0
Freedom Front Plus	222	228	450	1.0%	0	0	0
United Christian Democratic Party	199	216	415	1.0%	0	0	0
Congress of the People	114	262	376	0.9%	0	0	0
African Transformation Movement	2	27	29	0.1%	0	0	0
Total	21,602	21,552	43,154		15	14	29
Valid votes	21,602	21,552	43,154	97.8%			
Spoilt votes	476	516	992	2.2%			
Total votes cast	22,078	22,068	44,146				
Voter turnout	22,176						
Registered voters	50,908						
Turnout percentage	43.6%						
