= Lepidospora =

Scientific classification
- Domain: Eukaryota
- Kingdom: Animalia
- Phylum: Arthropoda
- Class: Insecta
- Order: Zygentoma
- Family: Nicoletiidae
- Genus: Lepidospora; Escherich, 1905

Species
- see text

Synonyms
- Brinckina Wygodzinsky, 1955 Lepidina Paclt, 1963 (Homonym)

Genus of silverfishes

Lepidospora is a genus of silverfish in the family Nicoletiidae.

== Species ==
- Lepidospora afra Silvestri, 1908
- Lepidospora alticola Wygodzinsky, 1965
- Lepidospora angustotergum Mendes, 2002
- Lepidospora attenuata Mendes, 2004
- Lepidospora braueri Escherich, 1905
- Lepidospora buxtoni Silvestri, 1923
- Lepidospora ceylonica Silvestri, 1911
- Lepidospora deharvengi Mendes, 2002
- Lepidospora digitata Mendes, 2002
- Lepidospora escherichi Silvestri, 1908
- Lepidospora gracilis Escherich, 1905
- Lepidospora grassii (Escherich, 1905)
- Lepidospora guesteni Mendes, 2004
- Lepidospora hemitrica Silvestri, 1942
- Lepidospora hemitrichoides Wygodzinsky, 1962
- Lepidospora insularum Wygodinsky, 1955
- Lepidospora kinolaensis Mendes, 2002
- Lepidospora kurda Mendes, 1985
- Lepidospora machadoi Silvestri, 1949
- Lepidospora makapaan Wygodzinsky, 1955
- Lepidospora mascareniensis Mendes, 1996
- Lepidospora meridionalis Silvestri, 1913
- Lepidospora multispina Mendes, 2002
- Lepidospora notabilis Silvestri, 1913
- Lepidospora ruwenzoriensis Mendes, 2002
- Lepidospora silvestrii Wygodzinsky, 1942
- Lepidospora vilhenae Silvestri, 1949
- Lepidospora worunzire Mendes, 2002
- Lepidospora wygodzinskyi Mendes, 1992
