= Sacred caves of the Basotho =

Caves in the Free State and Lesotho

For thousands of years, a pilgrimage has been made by the Basotho people to a network of sacred caves to communicate with the spiritual world. The caves also contain dinosaur footprints and ancient rock paintings. The caves are located between the eastern parts of the Free State and Lesotho. These sacred caves are often described as 'the key to religion' in Southern Africa.

== Caves ==
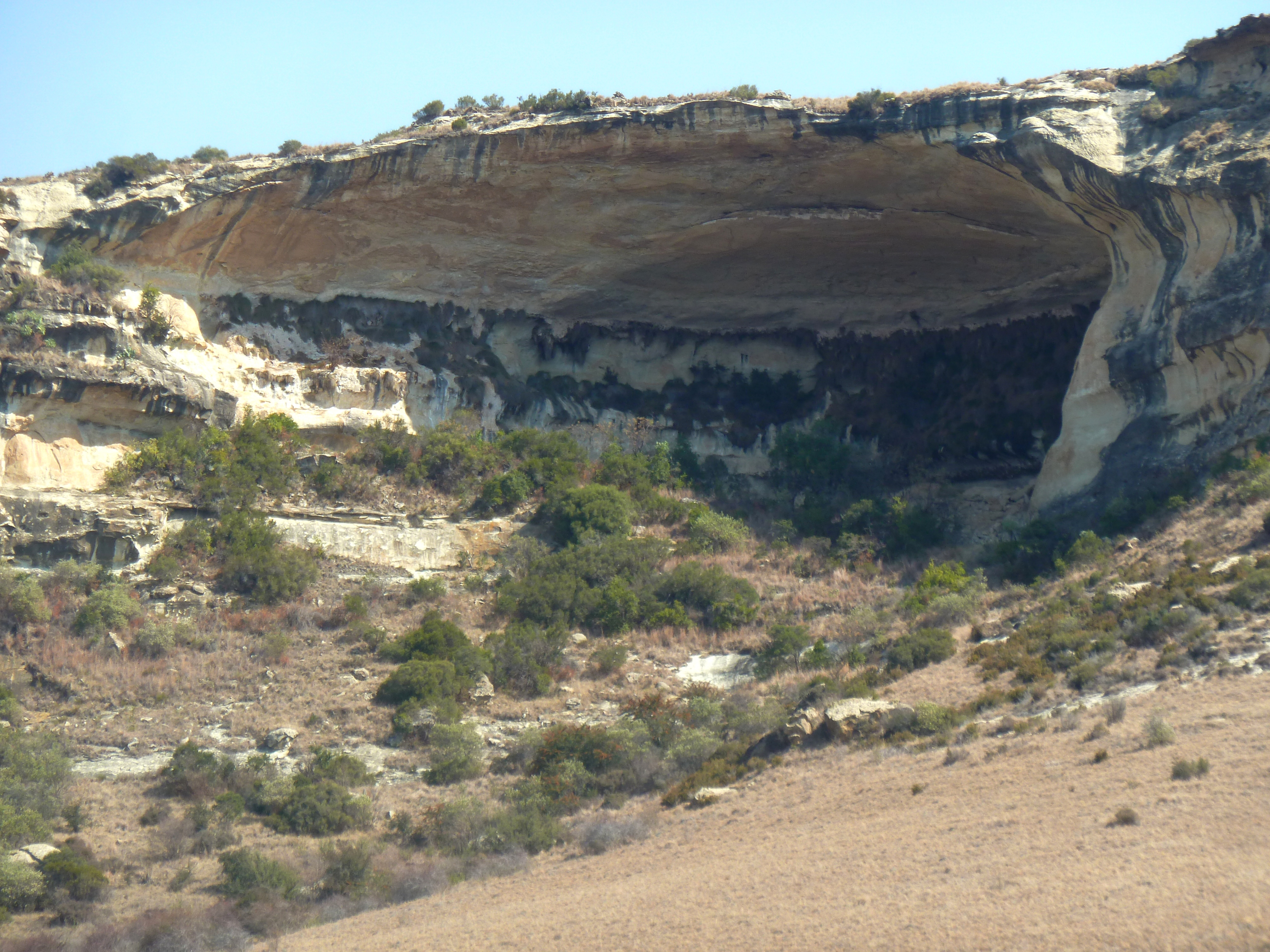
Sandstone Caves near Clarens, Eastern Free State

Caves have been known throughout human existence, religion, and culture as isolated spaces perfect for meditation and reflection. The Basotho people traditionally regard caves as a dwelling place for ancestors. The caves are visited by thousands of people to perform spiritual rituals. The Fertility Caves lie outside Clarens in the Free State at the foot of the Maluti Mountains in Lesotho. The Matouleng Cave Heritage site is 18 km away from Clarens. The caves lie below the second largest stone overhang in the Southern Hemisphere. Peripheral to the Matouleng cave is a small cluster of caves, the Badimong caves, as well as other areas regarded as sacred.

The caves have no specific spiritual authority, therefore, a combination of two belief systems co-exist in the caves namely Christianity and African traditions. While many sacred caves exist, the most popular remain the Motouleng caves and the Badimong caves.

The caves are used for a variety of purposes:

- a source of drinking water,
- source for virgin water,
- an area to perform religious rituals,
- an area for cremations and burials,
- art galleries,
- discarding ritual utensils and
- mining of the red clay for ceremonies.

The Basotho and other African traditions find water to be an element which is ancestrally significant therefore, the streams and pools in the caves play an important role in the ceremonies that occur in the sacred caves.

=== Mount Mautse ===
Mount Mautse in the Eastern Free State has been regarded as the 'Holy Mountains' since the 1970s. It is believed that the power of healing rests in caves residing in these mountains. These caves are regarded as the 'universities for practicing traditional rituals' which is why many traditional healers are frequently found here. Many traditional healers, who live in the Holy Mountains, believe that they have been sent by their ancestors to heal people. Many of these traditional healers leave their modern careers after being 'called' by the ancestors until they have fulfilled their healing duties. Traditional healers receive their 'calling' from ancestors through visions and dreams and are unable to deny the calling. A rejection of the calling could lead to sickness or even death. The traditional healers use water from the waterfalls and herbs from the mountains. People and animals live together in harmony in these caves.

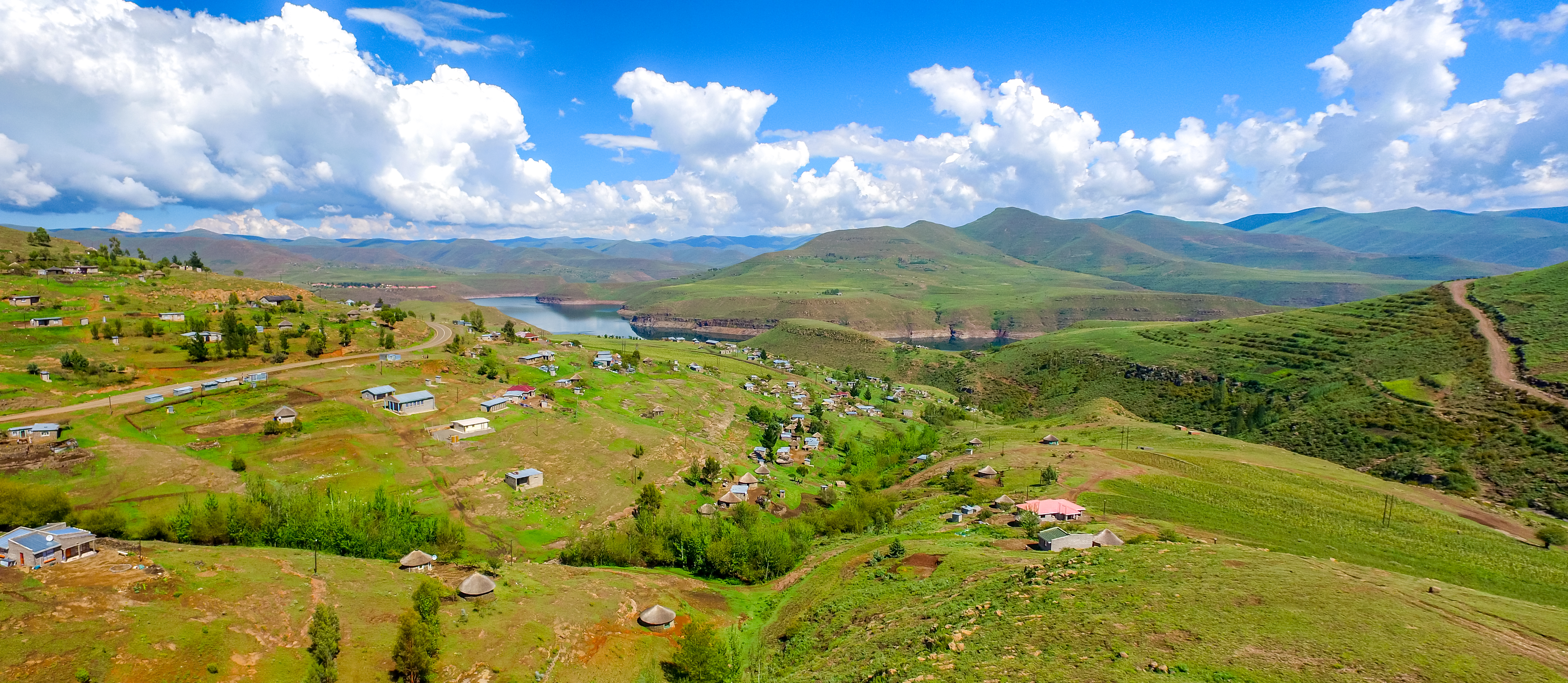
A village in the Maluti Mountains

=== Motouleng ===
The Motouleng caves, meaning 'place of beating drums', are located in the mountains of the eastern Free State and Lesotho, between Clarens and Fouriesberg. The large cave was created in a limestone mountain by a rock fall. A small river and pools lie below the cave. There is a fountain at the entrance of Motouleng called 'Sediba sa Bophelo', meaning 'The Fountain of Life' where people drop coins for good fortune. The cave is a 2 km hike from the nearest farm, which is located 15 km out of Clarens. Locals go as they please while visitors are required to attend guided tours to ensure respect for the ancestors. Women are required to wear long skirts and cover themselves up out of respect.

=== Bodimong ===
Badimong caves, meaning 'place of ancestors', is a complex valley with caves and isolated areas. The area lies between Ficksburg and Fouriesburg. These areas are believed to be possessed by powerful spirits. Close to these caves is a prominent sacred medicinal clay site called 'Nkokomoni', meaning 'the swelling place'.

Both the Motouleng and Bodimong cave sites are highly regarded as they contain many forms of symbolism for both the Basotho traditions as well as Christian individuals.

== Rituals ==
People who perform rituals in these caves include herbalists, diviners and traditional healers who all aim to treat disease and reduce misfortune. They also perform rituals to protect families, homesteads, cattle, and property. Rituals performed in these sacred locations are regarded as important for the holistic well being of an individual. The caves also function to mark the rite of passage for specific occasions including births, puberty, marriage, baptisms, and even funerals. The caves are also used to recognize harvesting times and commemorate unifying events as well as catastrophic events such as war and famine. These rituals are important as they help define the social makeup of the Basotho communities as they turn 'boys to men' and 'girls to women'.

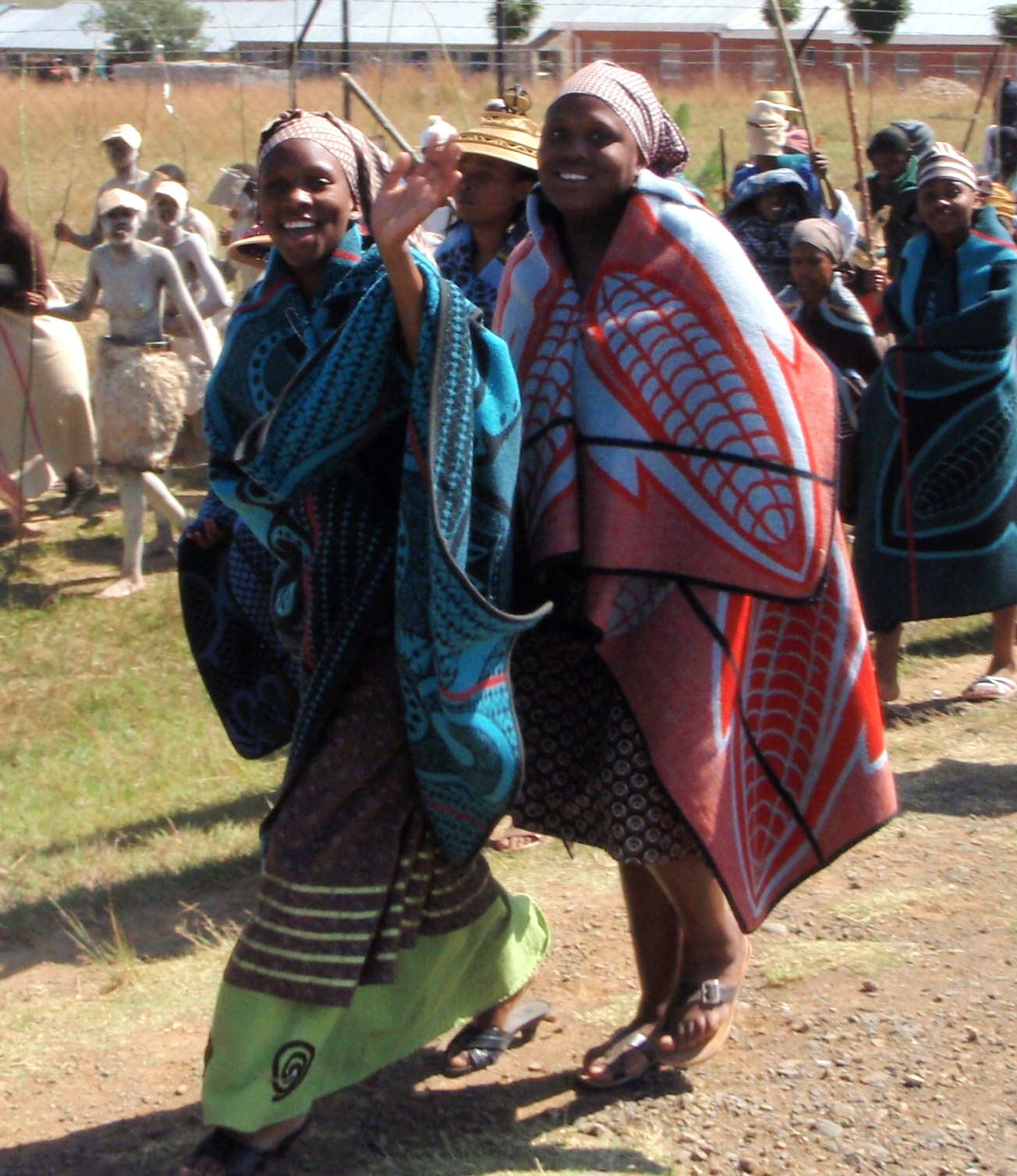
Basotho women during ritual

The areas are open for all people to see, however, some rituals are done in isolation and privacy as the Basotho community believes they require respect. Some of these rituals are profound, therefore people who do not understand the rituals or who are unable to show respect are not permitted to view as their actions or behaviours could anger the ancestors. A documentary on the essence of healing powers was consented to and produced in the fertility caves.

== Art ==
San rock paintings are found in the walls of the sacred caves. These paintings show that communities of hunter-gatherers lived inside these caves. The artwork in the caves is described as having a 'spiritual dimension' as the art displays trance experiences, unrealistic appearing animals, and other strange figures. The trances were achieved through rhythmic dancing and clapping in the caves. The trance is described as a 'feeling of transformation into the spiritual realm' where the people have the ability to fight evil spirits with the protection of animal power. Ancient paintings are still visible, however they are continuously being eroded by natural elements and cattle. Newer symbols written in English are also found in the caves. Many of these tell the stories of how HIV/AIDS has caused destruction in many of the local communities.

== Land and ownership ==
Tour guides report an initial resistance from farmers to allow people to visit the caves, as they are on private property. Some farmers charge an amount of eight South African rands for entry. The Basotho monarchy lost its sacred land between 1843 and 1869 to the settlers of the land. There have been multiple unsuccessful political appeals made for the return of the 'lost land'. There has been a rapid re-occupation of the sacred caves in recent years. Local white landowners have been unsuccessful in expelling new pilgrims. The state is not willing to place the laws of private property above those of access to religious and heritage sites.

Nearby these caves is Mautse, a black township, and Rosendal, a white farming and arts community. Mautse is a vulnerable community, as it is essentially a squatters camp. The weather conditions, specifically heavy rain, has caused destruction in the township, leaving people without homes. Within the last two years, Mautse community member Lerato Mosala and Rosendal business owner Frik de Jager created Project Nkgono to help rebuild homes in the township community. It has thus far been a positive effort to spark change in the township.

== See also ==
- Modderpoort
- Isinuka Mud Caves and Sulphur Pools
- Traditional healers of South Africa
