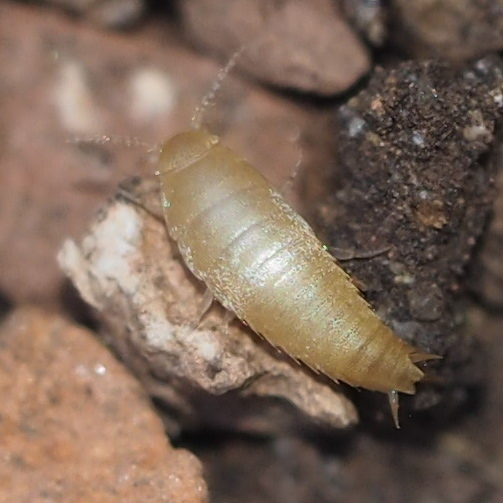
- Atelura formicaria

Scientific classification
- Domain: Eukaryota
- Kingdom: Animalia
- Phylum: Arthropoda
- Class: Insecta
- Order: Zygentoma
- Family: Nicoletiidae; Escherich, 1905

Subfamilies include
- Atelurinae; Coletiniinae; Cubacubaninae; Nicoletiinae; Subnicoletiinae

= Nicoletiidae =

Nicoletiidae Temporal range: Miocene–Recent

Family of silverfishes

Nicoletiidae is a family of primitive insects belonging to the order Zygentoma. These insects live primarily underground, under detritus, or in caves. A few species are recorded as commensals inside nests of social insects, such as the species Allotrichotriura saevissima which lives inside fire ant nests. Nicoletiids lack eyes and they lack pigmentation. They have long antennae and terminal abdominal filaments. Coletinia, a genus of this family, range in size between 10 and 15mm, and may have yellowish pigmentation but most species are transparent.

== Taxonomy ==
This list encompasses the genera accepted by entomologist Luis Mendes. As with most taxonomy, not all the listed genera are accepted by all authorities, such as Catalogue of Life or Interim Register of Marine and Nonmarine Genera.

- Atelurinae
  - Acanthinonychia Paclt, 1962
  - Allatelura Silvestri, 1947
  - Allograssiella Mendes & Schmidt, 2010
  - Allomorphura Silvestri, 1916
  - Allomorphuroides Mendes, 1987
  - Allonychella Silvestri, 1918
  - Anarithmeus Paclt, 1963
  - Arabiatelura Mendes, 1995
  - Assmuthia Escherich, 1906
  - Atelura Heyden, 1855
  - Atelurina Wygodzinsky, 1943
  - Atelurodes Silvestri, 1916
  - Ateluropsis Wygodzinsky, 1970
  - Atopatelura Silvestri, 1908
  - Attatelura Wygodzinsky, 1942
  - Ausallatelura Smith, 2007
  - Australiatelura Mendes, 1995
  - Bharatatelura Mendes, 1992
  - Cephalocryptina Mendes, 1986
  - Comphotriura Paclt, 1962
  - Congoatelura Mendes, 1996
  - Cryptocephalina Silvestri, 1908
  - Cryptostylea Mendes, Bach de Roca, & Gaju, 1992
  - Crypturella Silvestri, 1911
  - Crypturelloides Smith & Veera-Singham, 2011
  - Dinatelura Silvestri, 1908
  - Dionychella Silvestri, 1918
  - Dodecastyla Paclt, 1974
  - Ecnomatelura Wygodzinsky, 1961
  - Eluratinda Wygodzinsky, 1970
  - Galenatelura Smith, 2009
  - Gastrotheellus Silvestri, 1942
  - Gastrotheus Casey, 1890
  - Goiasatelura Wygodzinsky, 1942
  - Grassiella Silvestri, 1912
  - Gynatelura Wygodzinsky, 1970
  - Heterolepidella Silvestri, 1908
  - Heteromorphura Paclt, 1962
  - Heteronychella Mendes, 2001
  - Lasiotheus Paclt, 1962
  - Lepidotriura Paclt, 1962
  - Linadureta Wygodzinsky, 1970
  - Luratea Mendes, 1988
  - Machadatelura Mendes,1998
  - Malayatelura Mendes, von Beeren, & Witte, 2011
  - Mesonychographis Silvestri, 1908
  - Metriotelura Silvestri, 1916
  - Natiruleda Wygodzinsky, 1970
  - Neatelura Joseph & Mathad, 1963
  - Nipponatelura Uchida, 1968
  - Nipponatelurina Mendes & Machida, 1994
  - Olarthrocera Silvestri, 1908
  - Olarthroceroides Mendes, 2002
  - Pauronychella Silvestri, 1918
  - Petalonychia Silvestri, 1908
  - Platystylea Escherich, 1906
  - Principella Mendes, 2010
  - Proatelura Silvestri, 1916
  - Proatelurina Paclt, 1963
  - Protonychella Mendes, 2001
  - Pseudatelura Silvestri, 1908
  - Pseudatelurodes Mendes, 1992
  - Pseudogastrotheus Mendes, 2003
  - Rasthegotus Mendes, 2001
  - Rulenatida Wygodzinsky, 1970
  - Santhomesiella Mendes, 1988
  - Trichodimeria Paclt, 1963
  - Troglotheus Smith & McRare, 2014
  - Wygodzincinus Paclt, 1963
- Nicoletiinae
  - Nicoletia Gervais, 1844
- Cubacubaninae
  - Acanthonima Espinasa, 2005
  - Allonicoletia Mendes, 1992
  - Anelpistina Silvestri, 1905
  - Prosthecina Silvestri, 1943
  - Speleonycta Espinasa, Furst, Allen & Slay, 2010
  - Squamigera Espinasa, 1999
  - Texoreddellia Wygodzinsky, 1973
- Coletiniinae
  - Canariletia Molero, Gaju, Lopez & Bach de Roca
  - Coletinia Wygodzinsky, 1980
  - Lepidina Silvestri, 1949
  - Lepidospora Escherich, 1905
  - Pseudobrinckina Mendes, 2002
  - Squamatinia Mendes & Reboleira, 2012
- Subnicoletiinae
  - Allotrichotriura Mendes, Fox, Solis & Bueno
  - Allotrinemurodes Mendes, 2002
  - Hematelura Escherich, 1906
  - Hemitrinemura Mendes, 1994 (extant, with fossils known from Miocene Dominican amber)
  - Metrinura Mendes, 1994
  - Subnicoletia Silvestri, 1908
  - Subtrinemura Smith, 1998
  - Trichatelura Silvestri, 1932
  - Trichotriura Silvestri, 1918
  - Trichotriurella Mendes, 2002
  - Trichotriuroides Mendes, Bach de Roca, Gaju & Molero
  - Trinemura Silvestri, 1918
  - Trinemurodes Silvestri, 1916 (extant, with fossils known from Miocene Dominican amber)

== Extinct genera ==
- †Archeatelura Mendes 1997 Dominican amber, Miocene
- †Paleograssiella Mendes and Poinar 2013 Mexican amber, Miocene
