= Sierra del Tontal chinchilla rat =

Conservation status
- Least Concern (IUCN 3.1)

Scientific classification
- Kingdom: Animalia
- Phylum: Chordata
- Class: Mammalia
- Order: Rodentia
- Family: Abrocomidae
- Genus: Abrocoma
- Species: A. schistacea

Binomial name
- Abrocoma schistacea Thomas, 1921

Synonyms
- Abrocoma cinerea schistacea

Species of rodent

The Sierra del Tontal chinchilla rat (Abrocoma schistacea) is a species of chinchilla rat. Found only in Argentina, this species was once thought to be part of Abrocoma cinerea. In 2002, Braun and Mares from the University of Oklahoma confirmed it to be a separate species.

== Description ==
The Sierra del Tontal chinchilla rat is a smallish, rat-like animal, with a head-body length of about 16 cm (6.3 in), a tail about 10 cm (3.9 in) long, and an average adult body weight of 174 g (6.1 oz). It has drab greyish fur, which is paler on the underside, and has a faint stripe of darker fur running down the middle of the back and along the upper surface of the tail. The upper surfaces of the feet are covered with white fur, and there is also a distinct patch of white fur on the chest, covering a scent gland. The lower surfaces of the feet have thick pads with leathery tubercles, which help the animal gain traction on bare rock.

== Distribution and habitat ==
The species is known only from the Sierra del Tontal, in San Juan Province of north-western Argentina. The region is a rocky desert, dominated by shrubs and cacti, and the animal has been found between elevations of 1,100 and 2,900 m (3,600 and 9,500 ft). No subspecies are recognised.

== Biology and behaviour ==
The Sierra del Tontal chinchilla rat is thought to be primarily diurnal, being most active in the early morning, and live in groups of three to four individuals. They shelter in rocky crevices on east-facing slopes, and deposit their faeces in large latrines. They are herbivorous, and feed almost entirely on jarilla bushes, being resistant to the toxic compounds produced by those plants. Like the related Punta de Vacas chinchilla rat, the Sierra del Tontal species has a pair of "false teeth" in the mid-line of its palate, which apparently help with food manipulation and are aided by a horny pad on the tongue. These false teeth arise from the epithelium of the mouth, and are not preserved in skeletal remains of the animal.

Nothing is known of their reproduction, although other chinchilla rats give birth to litters of up to six pups twice a year.
