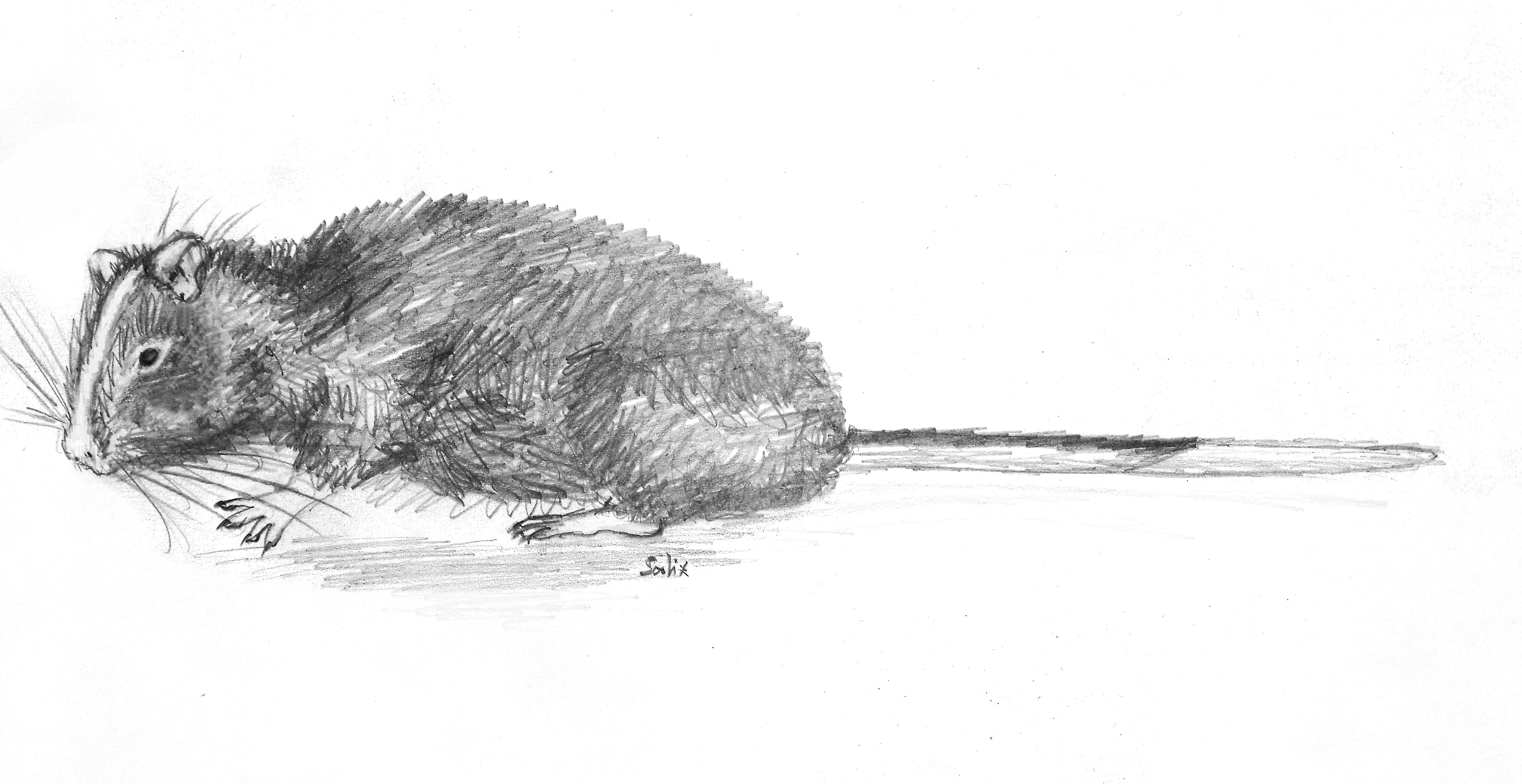
- Illustration of Cuscomys oblativus

Scientific classification
- Kingdom: Animalia
- Phylum: Chordata
- Class: Mammalia
- Order: Rodentia
- Family: Abrocomidae
- Genus: Cuscomys; Emmons, 1999

Type species
- Abrocoma oblativa Eaton, 1916

Species
- Cuscomys ashaninka Cuscomys oblativus
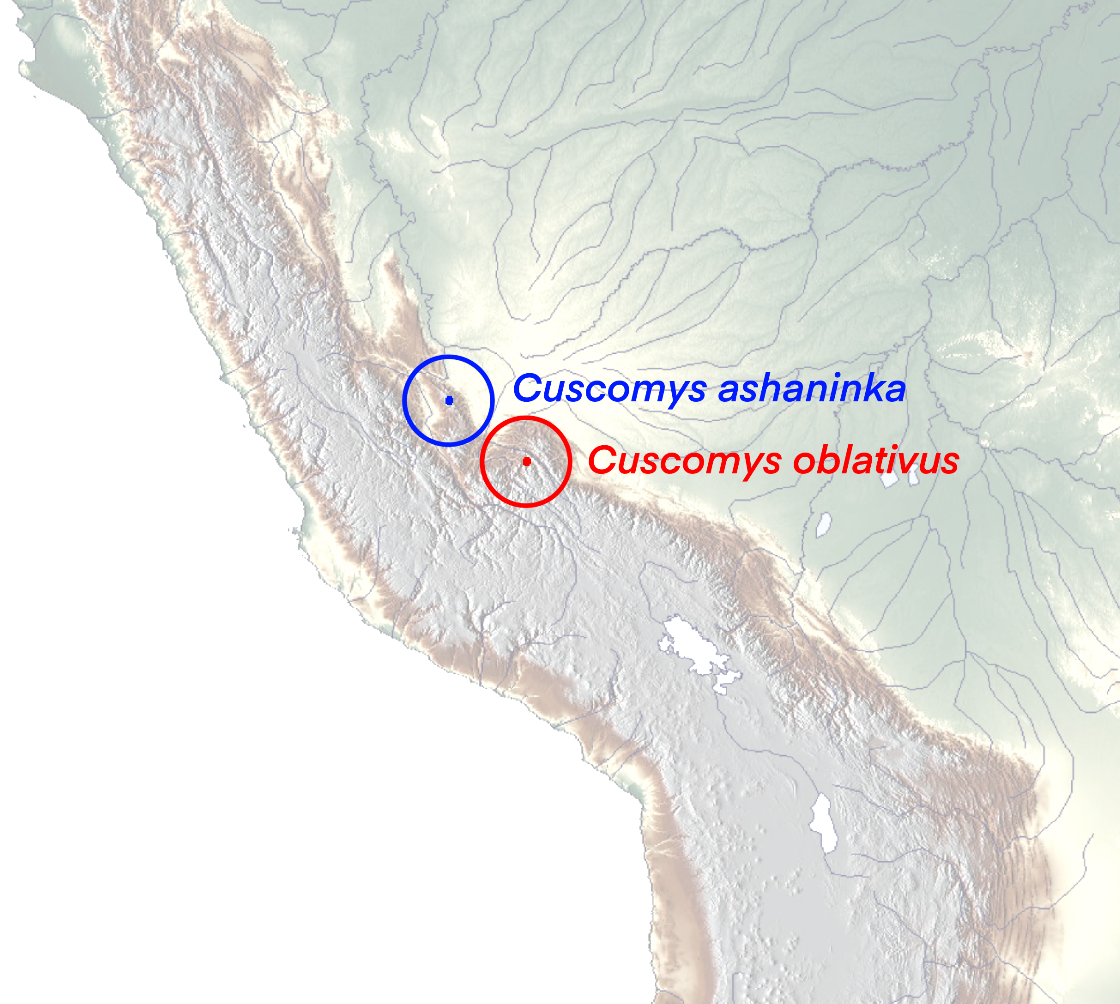

= Cuscomys =

Genus of rodents

Cuscomys is a genus of rodents found in the Andes of Cusco in southern Peru. These relatively large chinchilla rats are dark grey with a distinct white line running from the crown to the nose. The genus was coined in 1999 when C. ashaninka was scientifically described, but later it was discovered that C. oblativus, a species traditionally placed in the genus Abrocoma, actually belonged in Cuscomys. They are very poorly known, as C. ashaninka only is known from the holotype, while C. oblativus usually has been considered extinct, as it was only known from remains found in 1912, buried alongside people in ancient Inca tombs at the Machu Picchu ruins. However, photos of a rodent taken at the ruins in late 2009 likely show this species. It is unclear if the Cuscomys truly are extremely rare, as they may be easily overlooked due to their remote distributions and arboreal habits.

== Species ==
- Cuscomys ashaninka – Asháninka Arboreal Chinchilla Rat
- Cuscomys oblativus – Machu Picchu Arboreal Chinchilla Rat
