= Asháninka arboreal chinchilla rat =

Conservation status
- Data Deficient (IUCN 3.1)

Scientific classification
- Kingdom: Animalia
- Phylum: Chordata
- Class: Mammalia
- Infraclass: Placentalia
- Order: Rodentia
- Family: Abrocomidae
- Genus: Cuscomys
- Species: C. ashaninka

Binomial name
- Cuscomys ashaninka Emmons, 1999
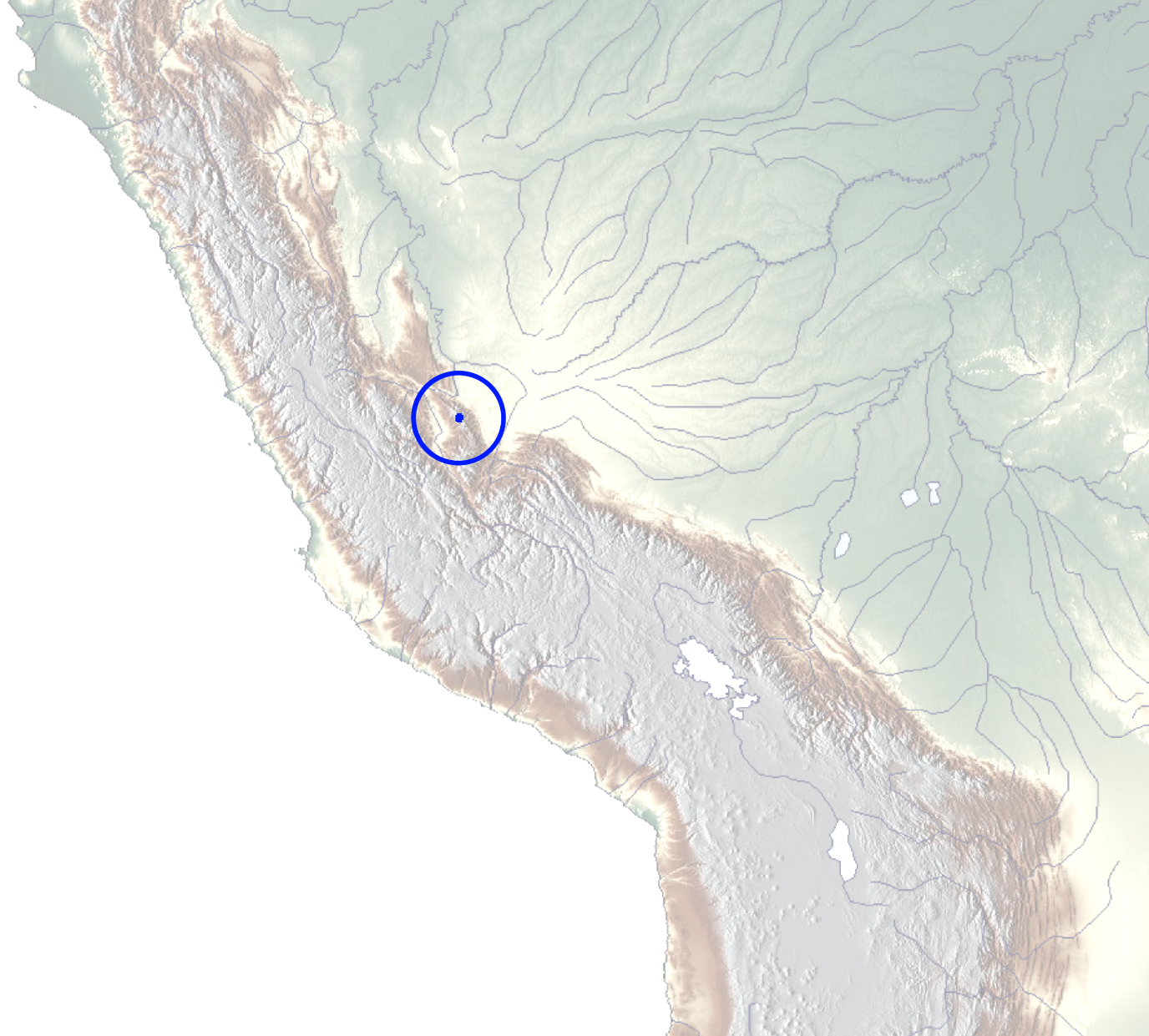

Species of rodent

The Asháninka arboreal chinchilla rat (Cuscomys ashaninka) is a large species of chinchilla rats from the Andes of far northern Cusco in Peru. It was first scientifically described in 1999.

The first specimen of this species was discovered by Louise Emmons, a researcher of the Smithsonian Institution from Washington, D.C., who found it by chance while climbing in the Vilcabamba Mountains near Machu Picchu. Emmons named the genus after the city of Cusco, and she named the species for the Asháninka people who live in Peru.

== Description and habitat ==
The animal has grey fur, with a white nose and lips, large claws, and a line of white fur running down its head. It is 30 cm (12 in) in length, with a tail of 20 cm (7.9 in). It weighs 910 g (32 oz). Ashaninka arboreal chinchilla rats live in dwarf forest and are hunted by long-tailed weasels.

== Classification ==
When described, it was placed in the family Abrocomidae, but was considered different enough from existing species for the creation of the genus Cuscomys. Since then, the Machu Picchu arboreal chinchilla rat (Cuscomys oblativus), a species of chinchilla rats originally placed in the genus Abrocoma, has been shown to be a member of Cuscomys. Although it was considered extinct by the IUCN at the time, photos of a rodent showing some similarities to C. ashaninka taken at Machu Picchu in late 2009 may show C. oblativus.
