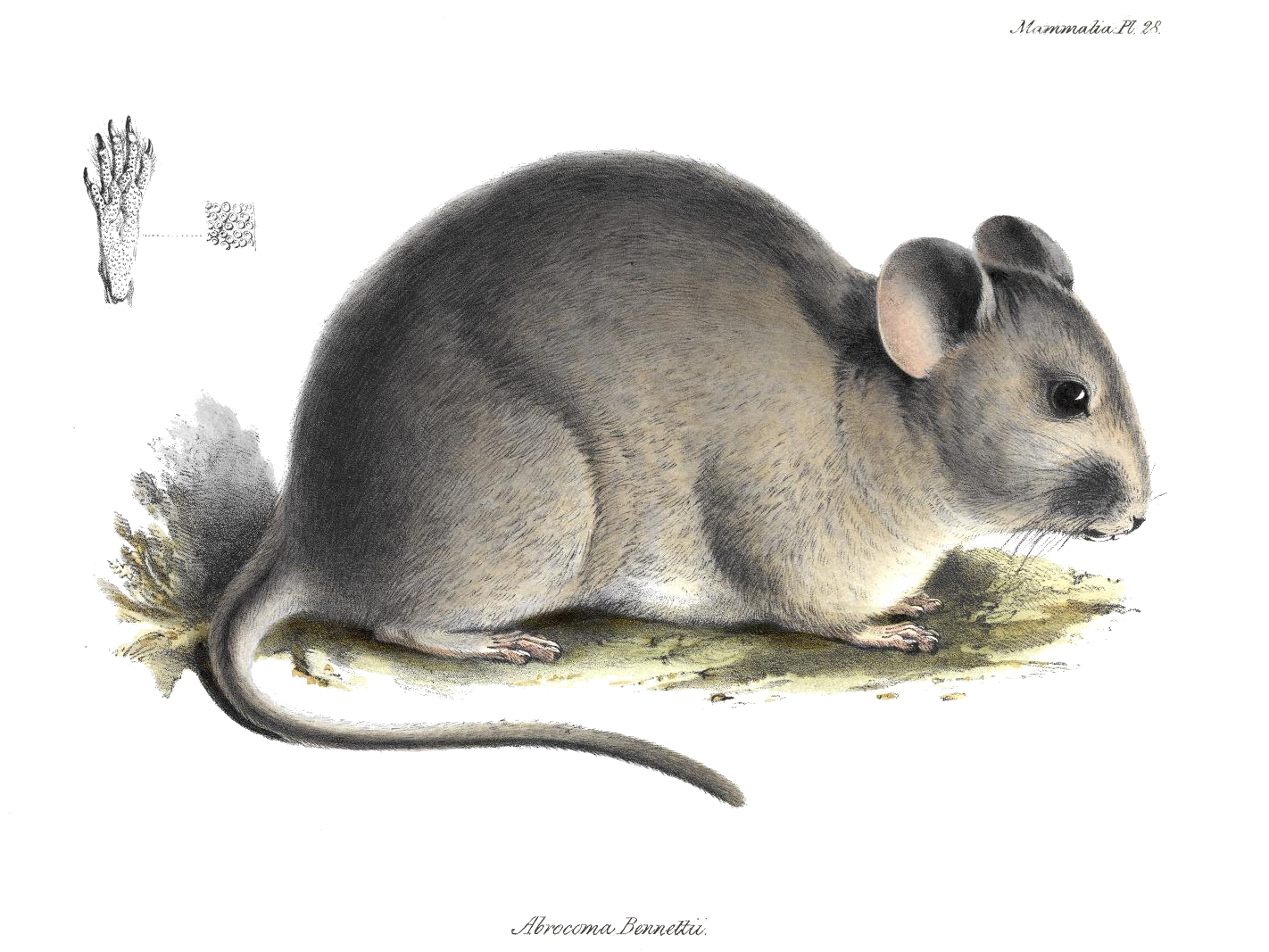

Conservation status
- Least Concern (IUCN 3.1)

Scientific classification
- Kingdom: Animalia
- Phylum: Chordata
- Class: Mammalia
- Infraclass: Placentalia
- Order: Rodentia
- Family: Abrocomidae
- Genus: Abrocoma
- Species: A. bennettii

Binomial name
- Abrocoma bennettii Waterhouse, 1837

= Bennett's chinchilla rat =

Species of rodent

Bennett's chinchilla rat (Abrocoma bennettii) is a species of chinchilla rat in the family Abrocomidae. It is found only in Chile where its habitat is Mediterranean-type scrub on the western side of the Andes. The IUCN has assessed its conservation status as being of "least concern".

== Description ==
Bennett's chinchilla rat is the largest species in the genus, with an average head-and-body length of 206 mm (8 in) and a tail about 80% of this. As with other members of the genus, the fur is long, dense and soft, and the ears prominent and rounded. The feet are broad but short, with four toes on the front feet and five on the hind; the small, nail-like claws are hidden by tufts of stiff bristles.

The dorsal pelage is dark brown tinged with grey, slightly paler on the flanks, and the hairs on the underparts have dark grey bases and pale grey tips; this gives them a frosted appearance and distinguishes this species from other members of the genus which have pale underparts. The tail is well-haired and a uniform colour. The dorsal surfaces of both fore and hind feet are clad in whitish fur while the undersurfaces are pigmented but un-furred. A sternal gland is present on the chest and is indicated by a patch of white hairs in some individuals.

== Ecology ==
The species is nocturnal and lives in a burrow. It often shares pre-existing burrows with the common degu (Octodon degus), the Chilean rock rat (Aconaemys fuscus) or the long-tailed chinchilla (Chinchilla lanigera). Alternatively it digs its own burrow, often under boulders. It is an efficient climber on both rocks and bushes, and it feeds on shoots and leaves, grasses and seeds.

== Status ==
Abrocoma bennettii has an extensive range in Chile on the western slopes of the Andes where it is found at altitudes up to about 2,000 m (6,600 ft). The habitat is being degraded by conversion to agricultural land and by mining, but this chinchilla rat is present in several protected areas and any downward trend in populations is slow, so the International Union for Conservation of Nature has assessed its conservation status as being of "least concern".
