= Budin's chinchilla rat =

Conservation status
- Data Deficient (IUCN 3.1)

Scientific classification
- Kingdom: Animalia
- Phylum: Chordata
- Class: Mammalia
- Order: Rodentia
- Family: Abrocomidae
- Genus: Abrocoma
- Species: A. budini

Binomial name
- Abrocoma budini Thomas, 1920

Species of rodent

Budin's chinchilla rat (Abrocoma budini) is a species of chinchilla rat in the family Abrocomidae. Found only in Argentina, the categorization of this species was based on analysis of four specimens which were caught among the rocks in the clefts of which it lived. It is specifically known from Otro Cerro, Catamarca Province and known to occur in rocky areas over 3,000 meters above sea level; research shows it may be confined to Sierra de Ambato in Catamarca Province and La Rioja Province. In 2002, Braun and Mares from the University of Oklahoma examined this specimen and confirmed it to be a separate species. Not enough is known about this species for the IUCN to assess its conservation status.

== Taxonomy ==
The species was first described in 1920 by the British zoologist Oldfield Thomas, working at the Natural History Museum, London. It is named in honour of Emilio Budin, an Argentine specimen collector who worked with Oldfield Thomas.

Ellerman, in 1940, considered Budin's chinchilla rat to be a subspecies of the ashy chinchilla rat (Abrocoma cinerea) but Braun and Mares, in 2002 recognised it as being distinct.

== Status ==
Budin's chinchilla rat is threatened by intentional and controlled burning of vegetation by cattle farmers in the area in which it lives and is not known from any protected areas. Aside from this, nothing else is known about the species. The International Union for Conservation of Nature states that too little is known about this animal and its population size and trend for them to assess its conservation status, so they rate it as "data deficient".
