= Violet chinchilla =

Coat-colour mutation of domestic chinchillas

Violet chinchilla is a recessive coat colour of the long-tailed chinchilla (Chinchilla lanigera). The mutation first appeared in Rhodesia (now Zimbabwe) in the 1960s and was later established in the United States. Breeders often call it "Afro-violet" or "Sullivan violet."

== History ==
Breeding accounts trace the mutation to Frank Gillingham of Salisbury, Rhodesia, whose herd produced the first violets. Animals from his herd were later acquired by Loyd Sullivan, who promoted the colour in the United States. A Rhodesian government notice in 1966 listed Gillingham as a chinchilla specialist, confirming his role in the industry at that time.

== Appearance ==
Violet chinchillas show a bluish-grey coat with a lavender tone over the guard hairs. The belly remains white, like in standard greys. Shade can range from pale to dark. Breeders sometimes cross the mutation with ebony to create a darker "violet wrap."

== Genetics ==
The violet mutation is recessive. Only chinchillas with two copies (vv) show the colour; carriers (Vv) look standard grey. Some sources also describe a separate "German violet" line with different genetic background.

== Terminology ==
Common names include "Afro-violet," "Sullivan violet," and "violet." Breeder accounts sometimes also call it the "Gillingham violet."

== See also ==
- Chinchilla
- Long-tailed chinchilla
