= Bolivian chinchilla rat =

Conservation status
- Critically Endangered (IUCN 3.1)

Scientific classification
- Kingdom: Animalia
- Phylum: Chordata
- Class: Mammalia
- Order: Rodentia
- Family: Abrocomidae
- Genus: Abrocoma
- Species: A. boliviensis

Binomial name
- Abrocoma boliviensis Glanz & Anderson, 1990
- Bolivian Chinchilla Rat Range Map

Species of rodent

The Bolivian chinchilla rat (Abrocoma boliviensis) is a species of chinchilla rat in the family Abrocomidae. It is found only in Manuel María Caballero Province, Bolivia. Its natural habitat is the rocky areas of cloud forests in Bolivia's interior.

== Habitat and ecology ==
The Bolivian chinchilla rat lives in the cloud forests of Bolivia, and may specialize in the rocky areas within the cloud forest. It is a herbivore, and lives in burrows. Young are born precocial after a relatively long gestation period.

== Threats ==
"Listed as Critically Endangered because its extent of occurrence is less than 100 km², all individuals are in a single location, and there is continuing decline in the extent and quality of its cloud forest habitat."

— IUCN, 2008 IUCN Red List of Threatened Species

Major threats to the Bolivian chinchilla rat include the clearing of its cloud forest habitat for cattle pasture and habitat fragmentation. It was historically trapped for its fur.
