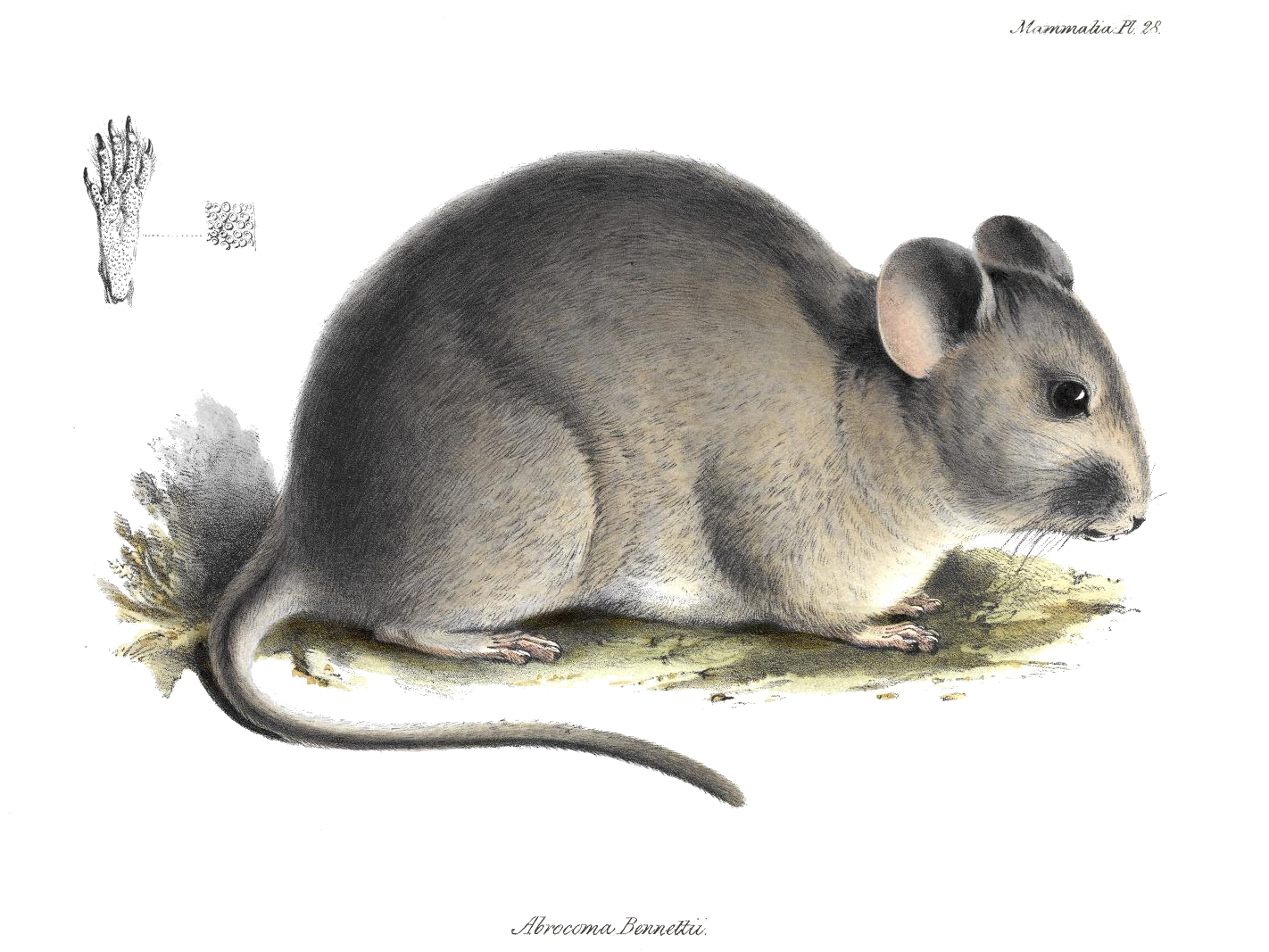
- Abrocoma bennettii

Scientific classification
- Kingdom: Animalia
- Phylum: Chordata
- Class: Mammalia
- Order: Rodentia
- Parvorder: Caviomorpha
- Family: Abrocomidae; Miller and Gidley, 1918

Type genus
- Abrocoma Waterhouse, 1837

Genera
- Abrocoma; Cuscomys †Protabrocoma
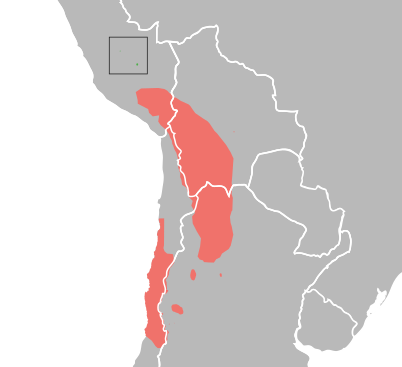
- Abrocomidae distribution. Abrocoma in red; Cuscomys in green in box.

= Chinchilla rat =

Chinchilla rats Temporal range: Late Miocene–Recent

Family of rodents

Chinchilla rats or chinchillones are rodents of the family Abrocomidae. This family has few members compared to most rodent families, with only nine known living species. They resemble chinchillas in appearance, with a similar soft fur and silvery-grey color, but have a body structure more like a short-tailed rat. They are social, tunnel-dwelling animals, and live in the Andes Mountains of South America. They are probably herbivorous, although this is not clear.

They can be described as medium-sized. Stiff hairs project over the three middle digits of the rear feet. Their massive skulls narrow in the facial areas. Some molecular work suggests that, despite their appearance, they may be more closely related to octodontoids such as degus, nutria, and tuco-tucos than they are to chinchillas and viscachas.

== Etymology ==
The family name is derived from the Ancient Greek word ἁβροκόμης (habrokomēs, "with delicate hair"). The word ἁβρός (habros) means "delicate, graceful" and the word κόμη (komē) means "hair".

== Species ==
- Family Abrocomidae - chinchilla rats
  - †Protabrocoma
    - †Protabrocoma antigua
  - Abrocoma
    - A. bennettii - Bennett's chinchilla rat
    - A. boliviensis - Bolivian chinchilla rat
    - A. budini - Budin's chinchilla rat
    - A. cinerea - ashy chinchilla rat
    - A. famatina - Famatina chinchilla rat
    - A. schistacea - Sierra del Tontal chinchilla rat
    - A. uspallata - Uspallata chinchilla rat
    - A. vaccarum - Punta de Vacas chinchilla rat or Mendozan chinchilla rat
  - Cuscomys
    - C. ashaninka - Asháninka arboreal chinchilla rat
    - C. oblativus - Machu Picchu arboreal chinchilla rat
