= Uspallata chinchilla rat =

Conservation status
- Data Deficient (IUCN 3.1)

Scientific classification
- Kingdom: Animalia
- Phylum: Chordata
- Class: Mammalia
- Order: Rodentia
- Family: Abrocomidae
- Genus: Abrocoma
- Species: A. uspallata

Binomial name
- Abrocoma uspallata Braun & Mares, 2002

Species of rodent

The Uspallata chinchilla rat (Abrocoma uspallata) is a species of chinchilla rat in the family Abrocomidae native to Argentina. This species was identified in 2002, by Braun and Mares from the University of Oklahoma. Only a single specimen has been examined.

== Description ==
This is a medium-sized species with a head-and-body length of 175 mm (6.9 in) and a tail length of 119 mm (4.7 in). The upper parts are greyish-brown, some of the hairs having black tips and others pale tips. The underparts are grey, the hairs having creamy tips. Both the front and hind feet are clad in white hairs, as is the region surrounding the anus. This rat can be distinguished from other members of the genus by the greyer upper parts and the paler underparts, the larger ears and the larger hind feet. Its karyotype has 2n = 66.

== Distribution and habitat ==
The Uspallata chinchilla rat is known from two localities in the northwest of Mendoza Province of Argentina, in the Sierra de Uspallata range. This is part of the Monte Desert biome and the altitude is between 1,850 and 2,150 m (6,070 and 7,050 ft), a lower altitude than other members of the genus. The typical habitat of this rat is rocky outcrops and rock crevices on steep slopes, with creosote bush (Larrea tridentata), saltbush (Atriplex lampa), bunch grasses (Stipa spp.) and cacti.

== Ecology ==
This chinchilla rat creates shallow burrows among the rocks and coarse herbage. It is diurnal and feeds on shoots and leaves, especially the leaves of the creosote bush; since this bush contains toxic chemicals, it is likely that the rat has lived in close association with it for a very long time, enabling it to acquire immunity to the toxins. It also feeds heavily on Lycium and Schinus.
