= Punta de Vacas chinchilla rat =

Conservation status
- Data Deficient (IUCN 3.1)

Scientific classification
- Kingdom: Animalia
- Phylum: Chordata
- Class: Mammalia
- Order: Rodentia
- Family: Abrocomidae
- Genus: Abrocoma
- Species: A. vaccarum

Binomial name
- Abrocoma vaccarum Thomas, 1921

Species of rodent

The Punta de Vacas chinchilla rat (Abrocoma vaccarum), also known as the Mendozan chinchilla rat, is a species of chinchilla rats in the family Abrocomidae. Found only in Argentina, this species was once thought to be part of Abrocoma cinerea. In 2002, Braun and Mares from the University of Oklahoma confirmed it to be a separate species.

This species prefers to live on rocky cliff faces and is found most frequently in an area 1,880 m above sea level.
