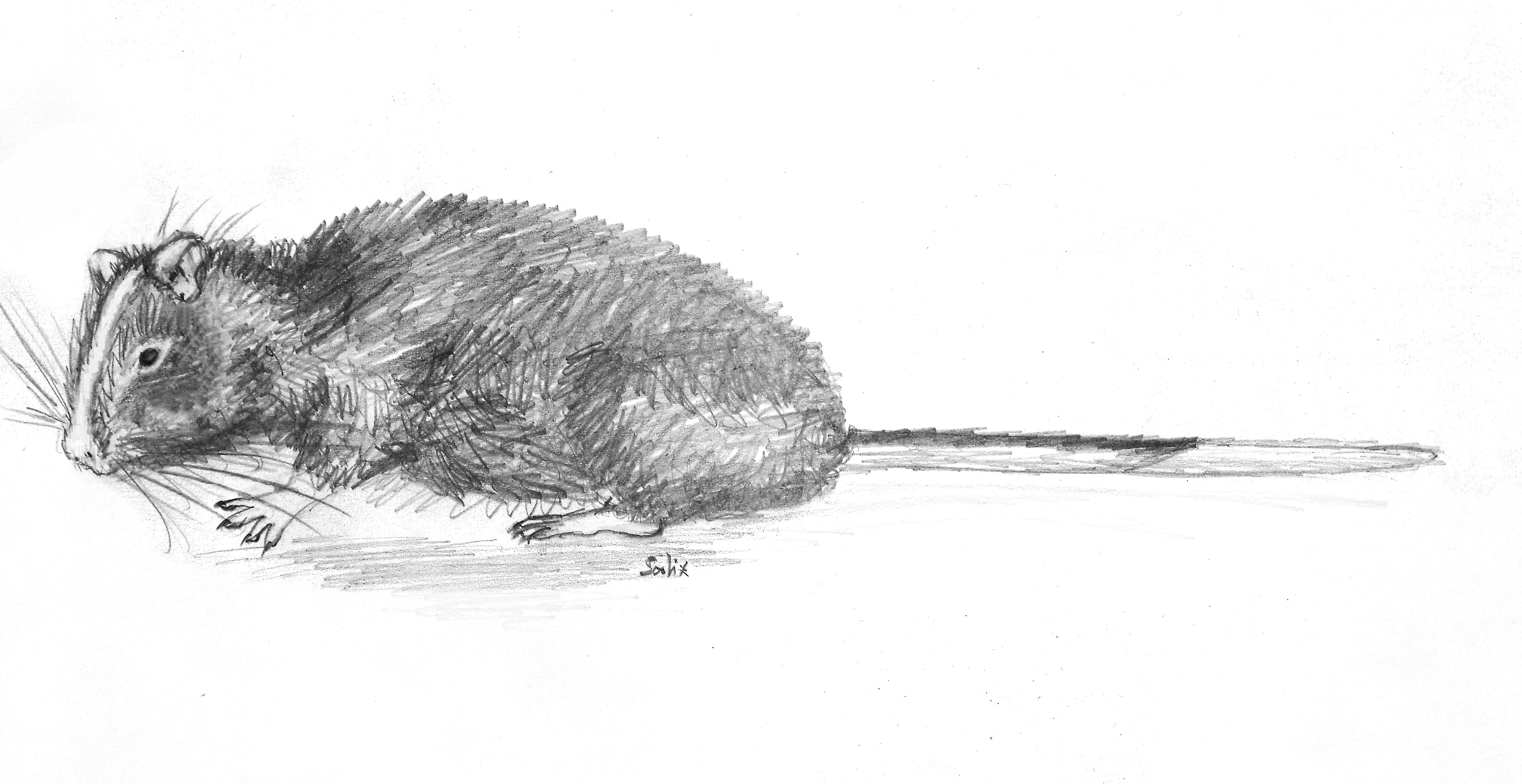
- Illustration

Conservation status
- Data Deficient (IUCN 3.1)

Scientific classification
- Kingdom: Animalia
- Phylum: Chordata
- Class: Mammalia
- Infraclass: Placentalia
- Order: Rodentia
- Family: Abrocomidae
- Genus: Cuscomys
- Species: C. oblativus

Binomial name
- Cuscomys oblativus (Eaton, 1916)
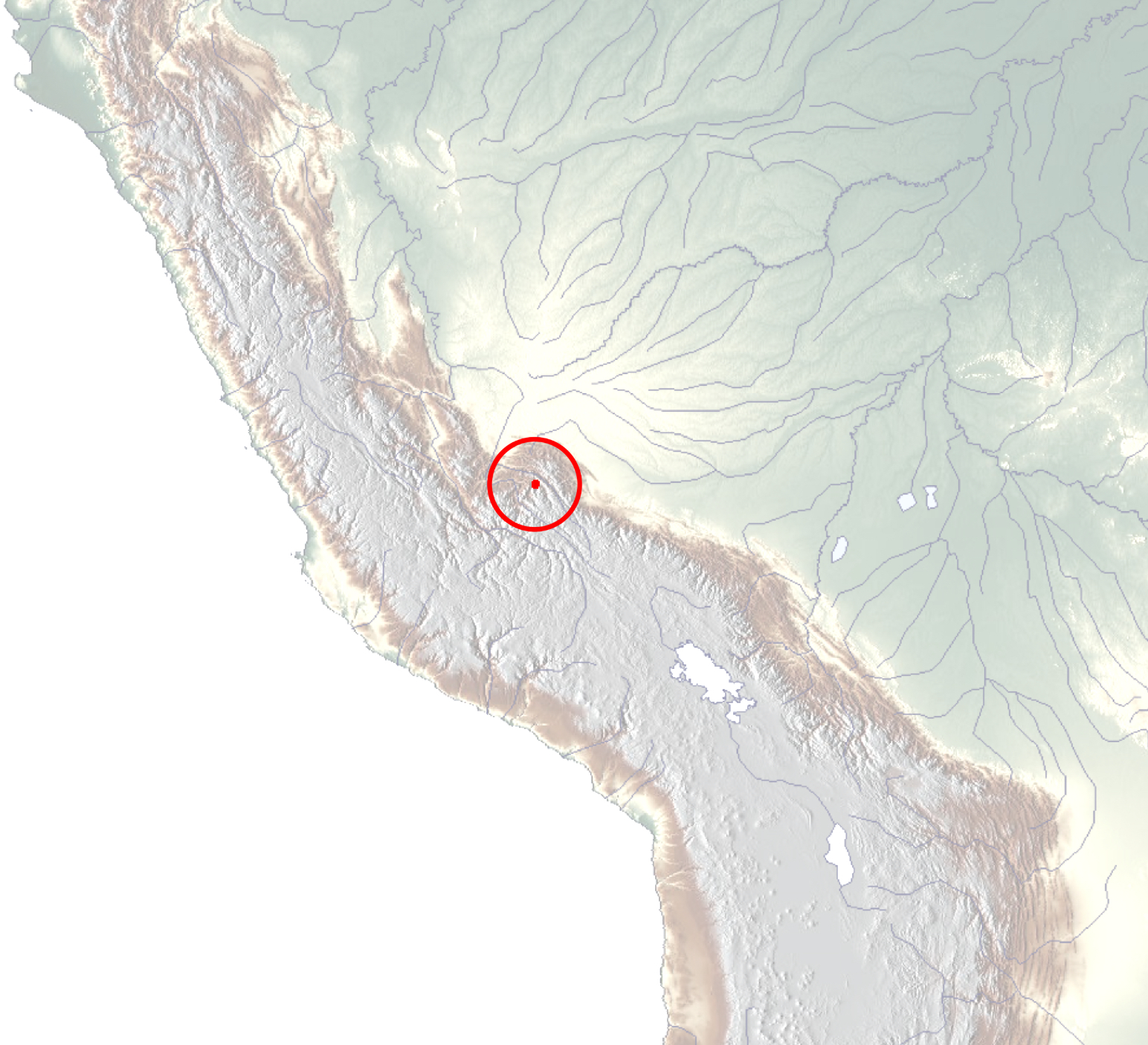

= Machu Picchu arboreal chinchilla rat =

Species of rodent

The Machu Picchu arboreal chinchilla rat (Cuscomys oblativus) is a large species of South American chinchilla rat, known from skeletal remains found by members of the Peruvian Expedition of 1912. The animals were buried alongside people in ancient Inca tombs at Machu Picchu in Peru. It was considered extinct by the IUCN in 2008, but conservation status was changed to data deficient in 2016. Photos of a rodent taken at Machu Picchu in late 2009 likely show this species, a finding apparently confirmed in 2014.

In 2020, as part of biodiversity study, a report was released with images that captured the rodent in the surroundings of Machu Picchu sanctuary.

Originally assigned to the genus Abrocoma, recent studies showed it to be more closely allied to Cuscomys ashaninka, a species unknown to science until 1999.
