= Famatina chinchilla rat =

Conservation status
- Data Deficient (IUCN 3.1)

Scientific classification
- Kingdom: Animalia
- Phylum: Chordata
- Class: Mammalia
- Order: Rodentia
- Family: Abrocomidae
- Genus: Abrocoma
- Species: A. famatina

Binomial name
- Abrocoma famatina Thomas, 1920

Species of mammal

The Famatina chinchilla rat (Abrocoma famatina) is a species of chinchilla rat in the family Abrocomidae found only in Argentina.
