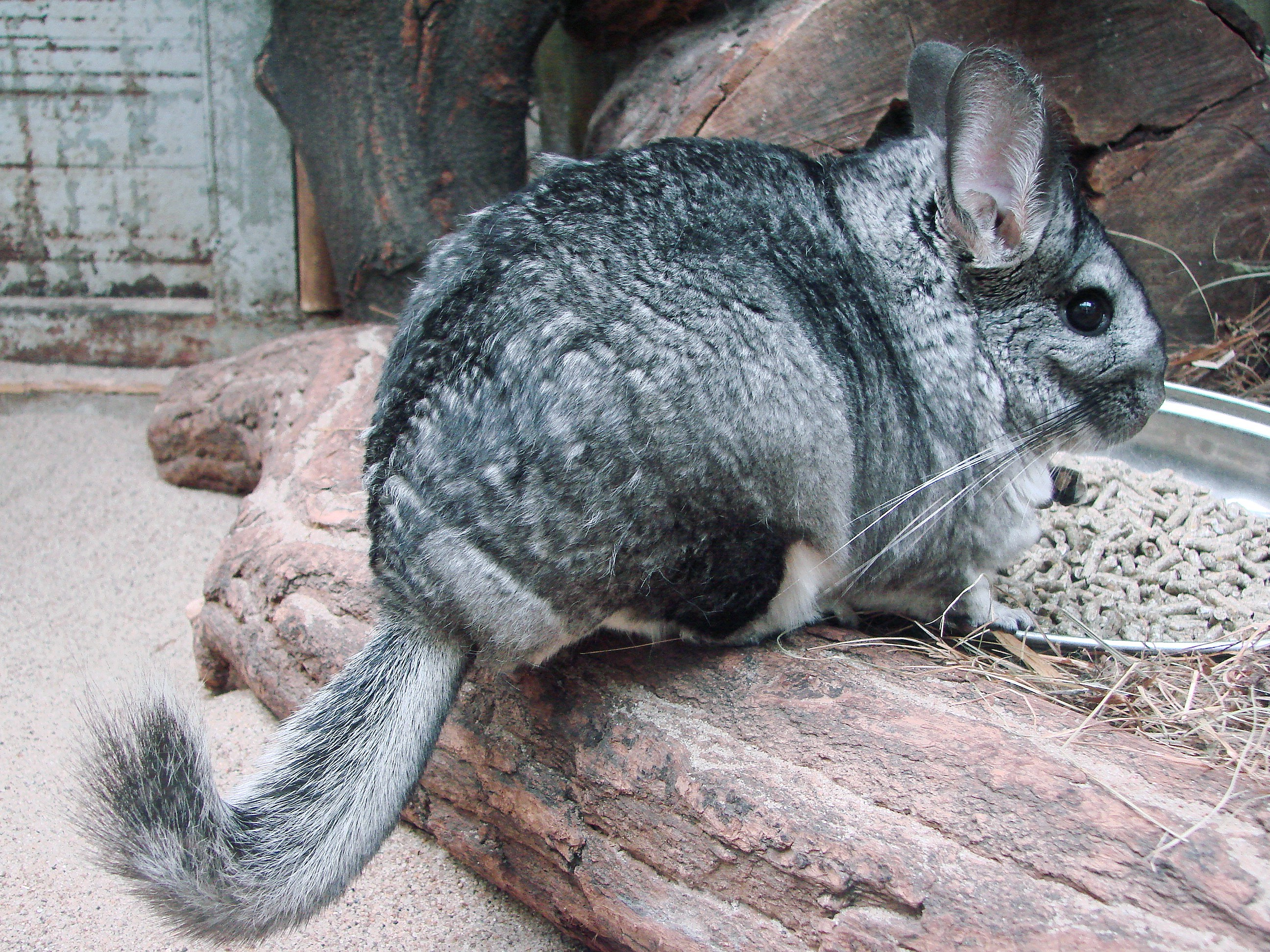
- Long-tailed chinchilla in zoo

Conservation status
- Endangered (IUCN 3.1)
- CITES Appendix I

Scientific classification
- Kingdom: Animalia
- Phylum: Chordata
- Class: Mammalia
- Order: Rodentia
- Family: Chinchillidae
- Genus: Chinchilla
- Species: C. laniger

Binomial name
- Chinchilla laniger Bennett, 1829
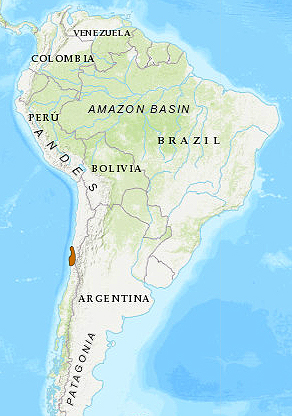
- Long-tailed chinchilla range in 2016

Synonyms
- Mus Laniger G. I. Molina, 1782; Cricetus laniger É. Geoffroy Saint-Hilaire, 1803; Lemmus laniger Tiedemann, 1808; Cricetus chincilla G. Fischer, 1814; Hypudaeus ?laniger Illiger, 1815; Chinchilla lanigera E. T. Bennett, 1829; Eriomys pellionum Van der Hoeven, 1830; Lagostomus laniger Wagler, 1831; Chinchilla laniger Meyen, 1833; Eriomys laniger Burmeister, 1837; Chinchilla velligera Prell, 1934; Chinchilla chinchilla velligera Osgood, 1943

= Long-tailed chinchilla =

Species of rodent

The long-tailed chinchilla (Chinchilla laniger), also called the Chilean, coastal, common, or lesser chinchilla, is one of two species of rodent from the genus Chinchilla: the other species being C. chinchilla. Both species are endangered in the wild after historically being hunted for their soft hair coats. Domestic breeds of chinchilla are believed to descend from specimens of C. lanigera. Domestic chinchillas come in three types: la plata, costina, and raton.

Historically, Chilean chinchillas were reported from Talca (35°30'S), Chile, north to Peru, and also eastward, from Chilean coastal hills, throughout low mountains. No fossils of the Chilean chinchilla are known to have been found, and by the mid-19th century, Chilean chinchillas were not found south of the Choapa River in central Chile. Wild populations of Chilean chinchillas, as of 1996, occurred in Aucó (31°38'S, 71°06'W), near Illapel, IV Región, Chile, in Reserva Nacional Las Chinchillas and in La Higuera, Chile, about 100 km (62 mi) north of Coquimbo (29°33'S, 71°04'W).

== Characteristics ==
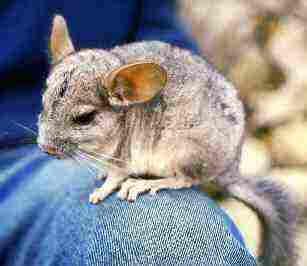
A young wild Chilean chinchilla (2006)

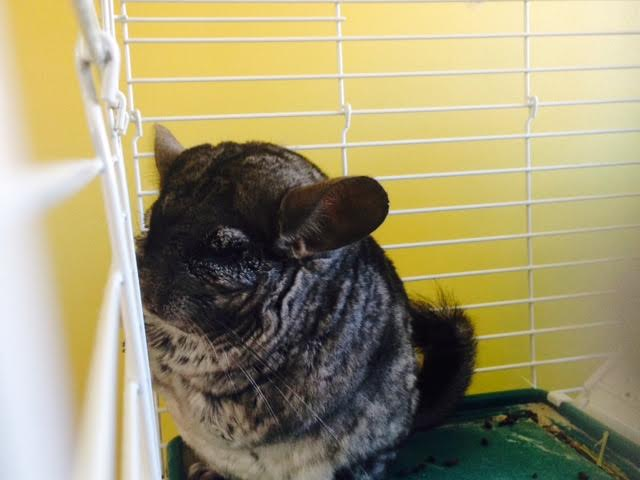
A domesticated chinchilla

Chinchilla laniger is smaller—wild animals have body lengths up to 260 mm (10 in)—has more rounded ears—45 mm (1.8 in) in length)—and a longer tail than C. chinchilla; its tail is usually about a third the size of its body—up to 130 mm (5.1 in) compared to 100 mm (3.9 in) in C. chinchilla. The number of caudal vertebrae is 23 in C. laniger versus 20 in C. chinchilla. Males typically weigh 369–493 g (13.0–17.4 oz) with a mean of 412 g (14.5 oz), while females weigh 379–450 g (13.4–15.9 oz) with a mean of 422 g (14.9 oz). Domesticated animals are larger than wild ones and more sexually dimorphic, with the female weighing up to 800 g (28 oz) and males up to 600 g (21 oz).

The word laniger translates into 'bearing a woolen coat', yet chinchillas do not have a woolen coat, but instead one consisting of hair. Chinchilla's hair color was originally mottled yellow-gray in the wild. Through selective breeding, their dominant colors include beige, white, and ebony, and the recessive colors include sapphire, violet, charcoal, and velvet. Their hair is 2–4 cm (0.79–1.57 in) long. It is silky, extremely soft, and firmly adhered to the skin. Up to 75 hairs, 5–11 mm (0.20–0.43 in) in diameter, emerge together from a single hair follicle. Vibrissae (whiskers) are abundant, strong, and long—100–130 mm (3.9–5.1 in)—and emerge from single follicles. The general color of their upper parts is bluish or silvery gray; the underparts are yellowish-white. The tail has long, coarse, gray and black hairs on its dorsal surface—30–40 mm (1.2–1.6 in) long near the body; 50–60 mm (2.0–2.4 in) long near the tip—and form a bristly tuft that exceeds the animal's vertebrae by 50 mm (2.0 in).

Chinchilla laniger's karyotype has 2n = 64 and FN = 126.

Chinchillas have a vertical split pupil in both eyes. They also have fleshy foot pads, which are known as pallipes. They can move the toes on their forelimbs to grasp things. Their hindlimbs tend to be longer than their forelimbs, like rabbits.

== Varieties ==
Three different types of domestic chinchilla are commonly recognized: la plata, costina, and raton.

The la plata type has a better-developed musculature and heavier bone structure than the other two types. The typical la plata looks more roundish or compact, with a short, wide head, a large distance from one ear to another, and a relatively straight dorsal line. The shoulders are often as wide as the chest and rump. The ears are short and nearly round.

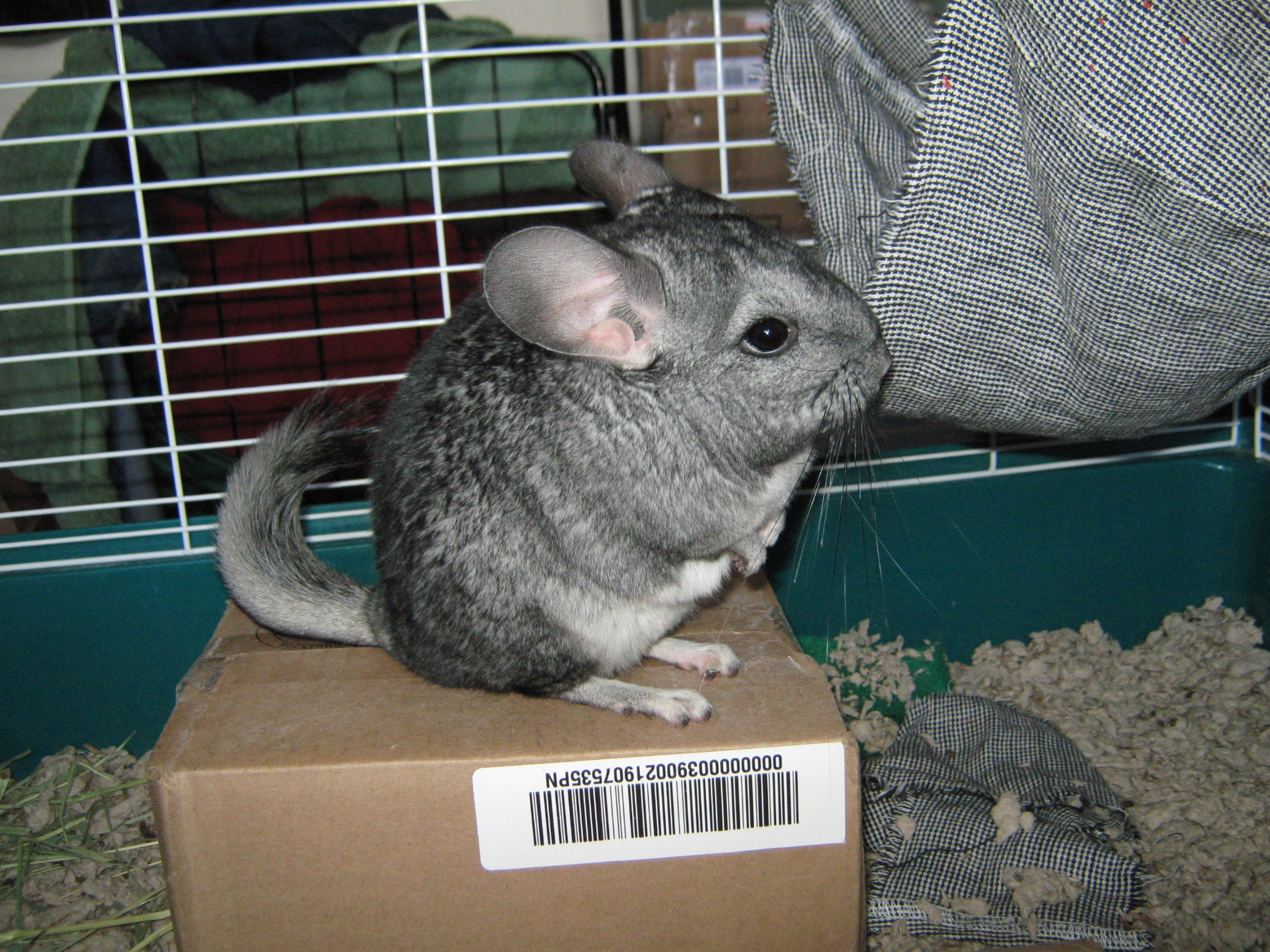
Costina type of domestic chinchilla standing on its hind legs

The costina type is weaker in musculature and bone structure, with the most distinctive feature being its longer hind legs. The forelegs are shorter and placed closer together, and the shoulders are narrower. The vertebral column is more arched; the neck line is sometimes very deep, forming a slight hump on the back of the animal. When viewed directly from the front, the head is V-shaped, the nose is pointed, and the distance between the ears is rather large. The ears are long and positioned at an angle around 45°.

The raton type is reminiscent of the la plata type in its body structure, but the nose is pointed as in the costina. The ears are positioned very close together and rather horizontal. It is distinctly smaller, on average.

== Ecology ==
=== Wild habitat ===
Chinchillas live in burrows or rock crevices in the Andes of Northern Chile at elevations of about 3,000 to 5,000 m (9,800 to 16,400 ft).

The climate in the wild chinchillas' native habitat is rather harsh, with daytime summer temperatures climbing up to 30 °C (86 °F) in the shade and dropping to 7 °C (45 °F) at night (even below the freezing point in winter).

In the wild, they breed seasonally between October and December, the months of spring in the Southern Hemisphere.

=== Domestic habitat ===
Chinchillas should be carefully bred in a dry and cool environment. The proper temperature for chinchillas to live in is 65°–80 °F (18.3°–26.7 °C). Extremely high temperatures (higher than 80 °F or 26.7 °C) and low temperatures (lower than 30 °F or 0 °C) are considered unsuitable for chinchilla growth. Exposure to extremely high temperatures can result in heatstroke and seizures. High humidity may also affect hair growth.

== Behavior ==
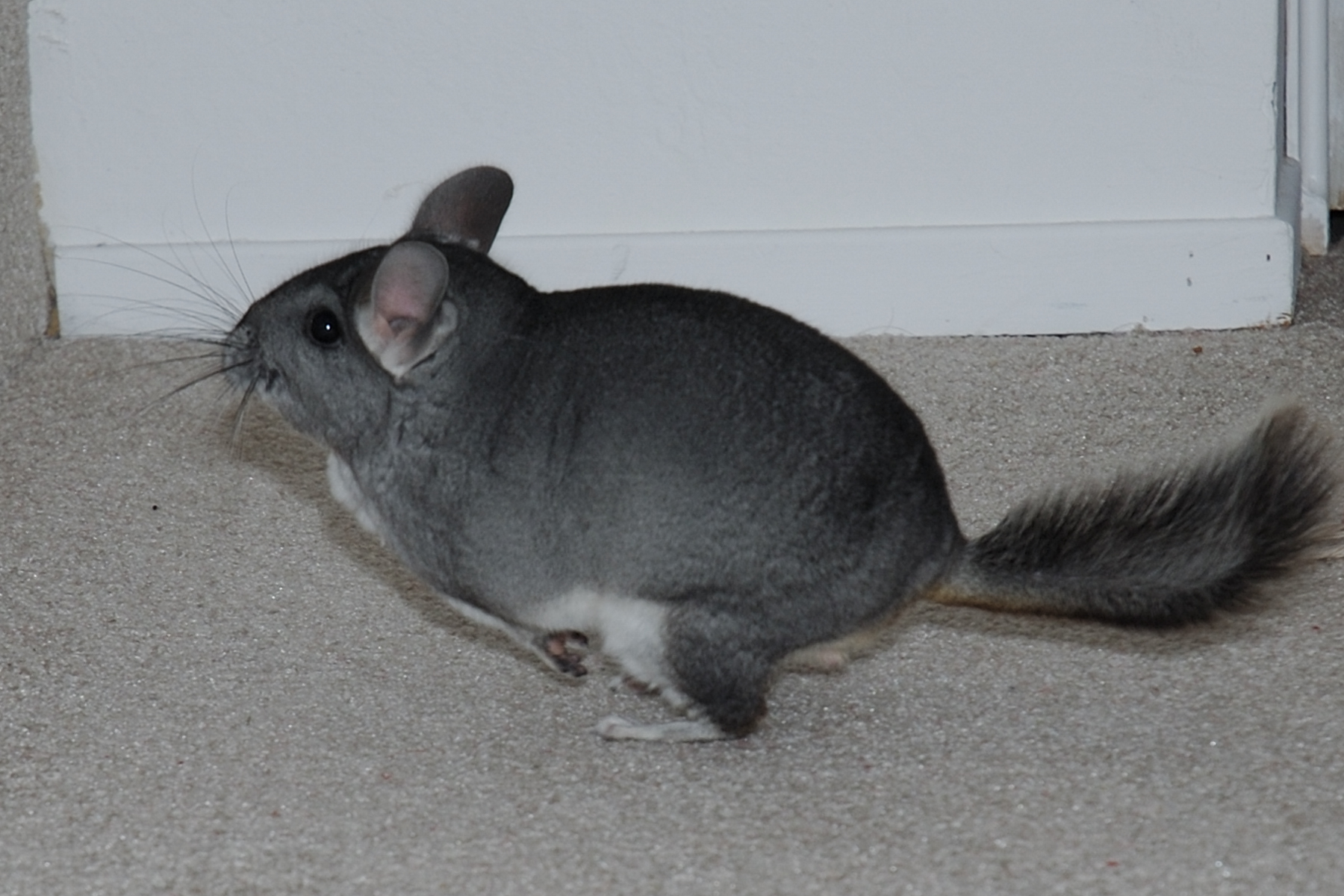
A domesticated chinchilla running across a carpet

As rodents, they are crepuscular animals — active during twilight hours. As herbivores, they are gregarious and prefer living in groups. Usually, males and females have a harmonious relationship with each other. They rarely fight in the breeding and mating season. Chinchillas are matriarchal animals.

Chinchillas have a high demand for dietary fiber. A well-balanced chinchilla diet consists of high-quality grass hay, chinchilla pellets and limited amounts of vegetables and fruits. They should be provided clean and filtered water contained in a bottle equipped with a sipper tube daily. The feed intakes of adult chinchillas are about 5-6% of their weights. The posture of the chinchilla when eating food is like that of the squirrel. They use hind limbs to sit and use forelimbs to grab the food and put them in their mouth.

Chinchillas require a dust bath at least twice a week in fine volcanic ash. They like to play and roll in the dust.

Chinchillas use a variety of vocalizations to communicate emotional states and social intentions. These include soft cooing or chirping when content, barking sounds when alarmed, and teeth chattering when irritated or threatened. Vocal behavior plays an important role in their social interactions and responses to environmental stimuli.

== Offspring ==
There is no obvious seasonal variation in the reproductive organs of the male chinchilla. They are able to breed all year round. The breeding season is mostly from November to May in the Northern Hemisphere and from May to November in the Southern Hemisphere. The female chinchilla's gestation period is 110 to 124 days. The females can have babies 2 times per year and 1 to 6 in a litter each time they give birth. The newborn chinchilla is born with hair and can run immediately after birth. The birth weight is about 1.2 ounces (35 grams). The breastfeeding period is about 45 days (6 to 8 weeks). Chinchillas become adults when they are about 8 months old. Generally, their average lifespan is 10 years, though some can live up to 20 years with human care.

== Pelt industry ==
Chinchillas have historically been hunted for their luxurious coats. This has led to their endangered status.

== Conservation status ==
The Chilean chinchilla is endangered, with the second-highest conservation priority among Chilean mammals.
