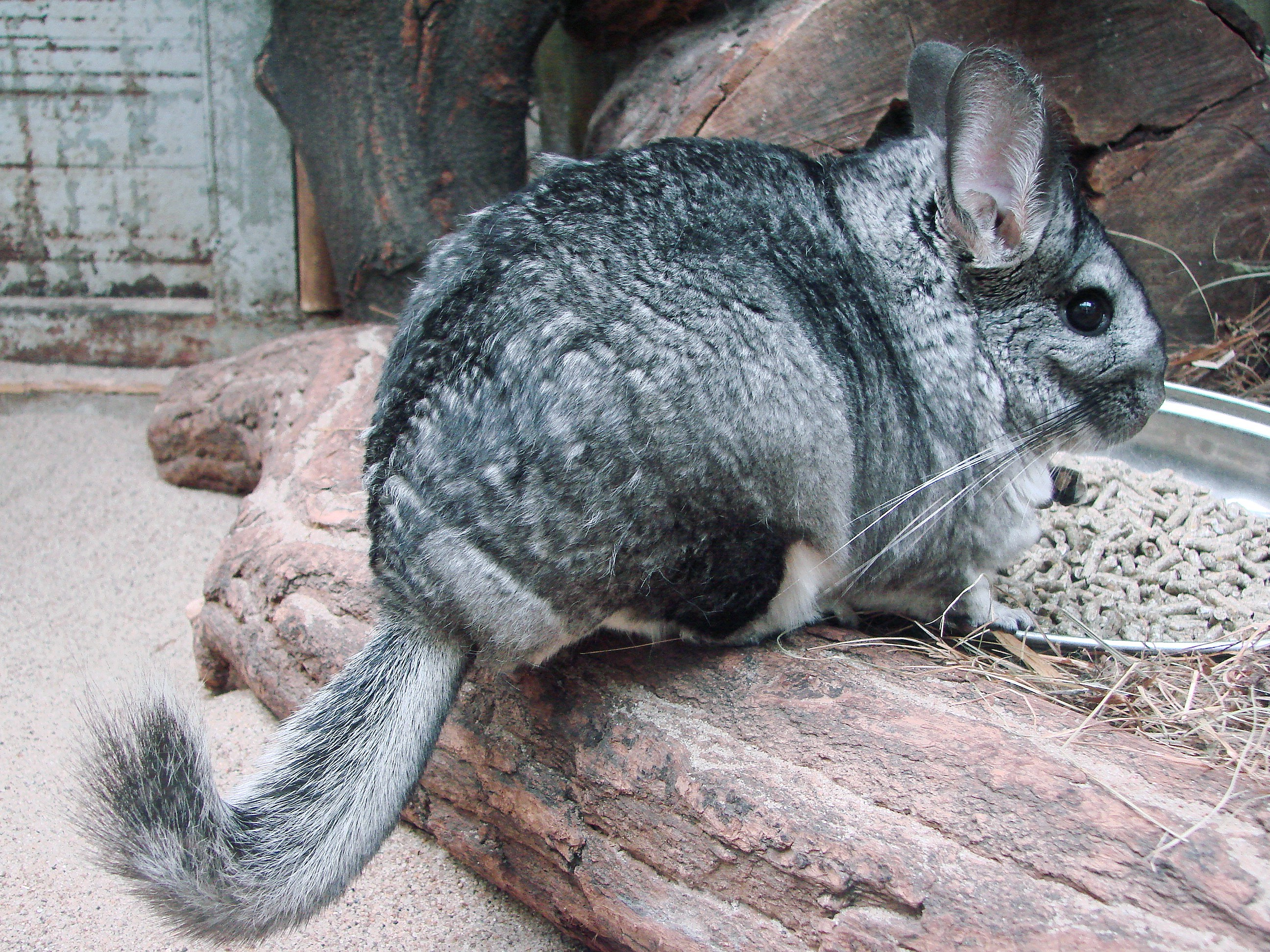
- Chinchilla lanigera at the Wrocław Zoo in Poland

Scientific classification
- Kingdom: Animalia
- Phylum: Chordata
- Class: Mammalia
- Order: Rodentia
- Family: Chinchillidae
- Subfamily: Chinchillinae
- Genus: Chinchilla; Bennett, 1829

Type species
- Chinchilla lanigera Bennett, 1829

Species
- Chinchilla chinchilla; Chinchilla lanigera
- Range of C. lanigera and C. chinchilla. C. chinchilla C. lanigera

= Chinchilla =

Rodent genus

Chinchilla (Note: Spanish pronunciation: [t͡ʃĩnʲˈt͡ʃiʝa]) is a genus consisting of two species (Chinchilla chinchilla and Chinchilla lanigera) of crepuscular rodents of the parvorder Caviomorpha, native to the Andes Mountains in South America. They live in colonies called "herds" at high elevations up to 4,270 m (14,000 ft). Historically, chinchillas lived in an area that included parts of Bolivia, Peru and Chile, but today, colonies in the wild are known only in Chile. Along with their relatives, viscachas, they make up the family Chinchillidae. They are also related to the chinchilla rat.

Chinchillas have the densest fur of all extant terrestrial mammals, with around 20,000 hairs per square centimeter and 50 hairs growing from each follicle. The chinchilla is named after the Chincha people of the Andes, who once wore its dense, velvet-like fur and ate its meat. By the end of the 19th century, chinchillas had become quite rare after being hunted for their notably soft fur. Most chinchillas currently used by the fur industry for clothing and other accessories are farm-raised. Domestic chinchillas descended from C. lanigera are sometimes kept as pets, and may be considered a type of pocket pet.

== Species ==
Comparison of chinchilla species

The two living species of chinchilla are Chinchilla chinchilla (formerly known as Chinchilla brevicaudata) and Chinchilla lanigera. C. chinchilla has a shorter tail, a thicker neck and shoulders, and shorter ears than C. lanigera. The former species is currently facing extinction; the latter, though rare, can be found in the wild. Domesticated chinchillas are thought to be of the C. lanigera species.

== Distribution and habitat ==
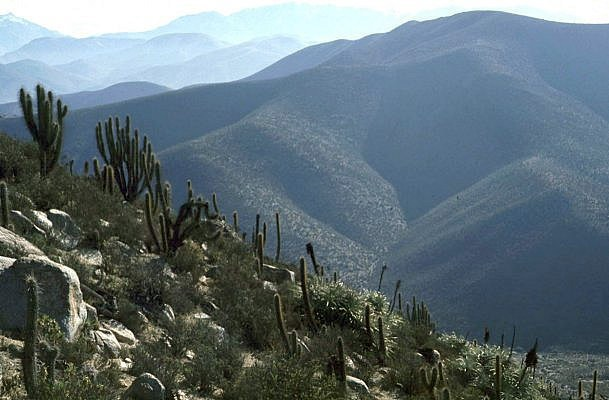
Chinchilla habitat in the Andes Mountains of Chile

Chinchillas formerly occupied the coastal regions, hills, and mountains of Chile, Peru, Argentina, and Bolivia. Overexploitation caused the downturn of these populations and, as early as 1914, one scientist claimed that the species was headed for extinction. Five years of fieldwork (published in 2007) in Jujuy Province, Argentina, failed to find a single specimen. Populations in Chile were thought extinct by 1953, but the animal was found to inhabit an area in the Antofagasta Region in the late 1900s and early 2000s. The animal may be extinct in Bolivia and Peru, though one specimen found (in a restaurant in Cerro de Pasco) may hail from a native population.

In their native habitats, chinchillas live in burrows or crevices in rocks. They are agile jumpers and can jump up to 1.8 m (6 ft). Predators in the wild include birds of prey, skunks, felines, snakes and canines. Chinchillas have a variety of defensive tactics, including spraying urine and releasing fur if bitten. In the wild, chinchillas have been observed eating plant leaves, fruits, seeds, and small insects. In nature, chinchillas live in social groups that resemble colonies, but are properly called herds. Herd sizes can range from 14 members up to 100, and herding behavior is thought to promote both social interaction and protection from predators. They can breed any time of the year, though breeding season typically falls between May and November. They are typically monogamous. Their gestation period is 111 days, longer than most rodents. Due to this long pregnancy, chinchillas are born fully furred and with eyes open. Litters are usually small in number, predominantly two.

== Conservation ==
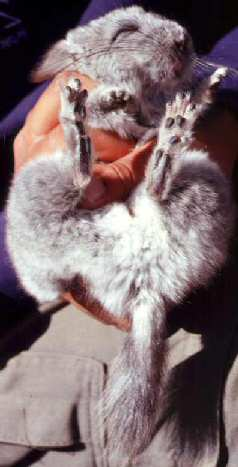
A short-tailed chinchilla, classified as "Endangered" by the IUCN, in Chile in 2007

Both species of chinchilla are currently listed as Endangered by the IUCN Red List of Threatened Species due to a severe population loss approximated at a 90% global population loss since 2001. The severe population decline has been caused by chinchilla hunting by humans. The long tailed-species was listed on the IUCN Red List as "Very rare and believed to be decreasing in numbers" in 1965. From 1982 to 1996, both species were listed as Indeterminate. In 2006, the long-tailed species was listed as "Vulnerable" while the short-tailed species was listed as "Critically Endangered". By 2008, both were listed as "Critically Endangered", and in 2016 they were reclassified as "Endangered" due to limited recovery in some areas.

== Relationship with humans ==
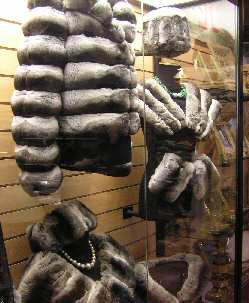
Chinchilla fur coat and accessories

=== Fur industry ===
Chinchilla fur trade on an international level goes back to the 16th century. Their fur is popular due to its extremely soft feel, which is caused by the sprouting of 25 hairs (on average) from each hair follicle. The color is usually very even, which makes it ideal for small garments or the lining of larger ones, though some large pieces can be made entirely from the fur. A single, full-length coat made from chinchilla fur may require as many as 150 pelts, as chinchillas are relatively small. Their use for fur led to the near extinction of one species (C. chinchilla), and put serious pressure on the other (C. lanigera). Though it is illegal to hunt wild chinchillas, they are now on the verge of becoming extinct because of continued poaching. Domesticated chinchillas are still bred for fur.

=== As pets ===
The domestic chinchilla is descended from Chinchilla lanigera, the long-tailed chinchilla. They are the more common one in the wild, as the other species, Chinchilla chinchilla, or short-tailed chinchilla, has been hunted nearly to extinction. Domestic chinchillas have thinner bodies, longer tails and larger ears. In the wild, the average life-span of a chinchilla is ten years; however, they could live up to 20 years in human care.

Chinchillas are popular pets, though they require extensive exercise and dental care, due to their teeth continually growing throughout their life span, and since they lack the ability to sweat, they require a temperature-controlled environment.

The animals instinctively clean their fur by taking dust baths, in which they roll around in special dust made of fine pumice, a few times a week; they should not bathe in water, as mold and matting can occur. Their thick fur resists parasites, such as fleas, and reduces loose dander.

Pet chinchillas require easy access to food, water, and hiding places, where they can sleep undisturbed for extended periods of time. Chinchillas are typically highly social creatures, so owners should interact often with their pets. They also have sensitive hearing and are easily startled by loud, unexpected noises.

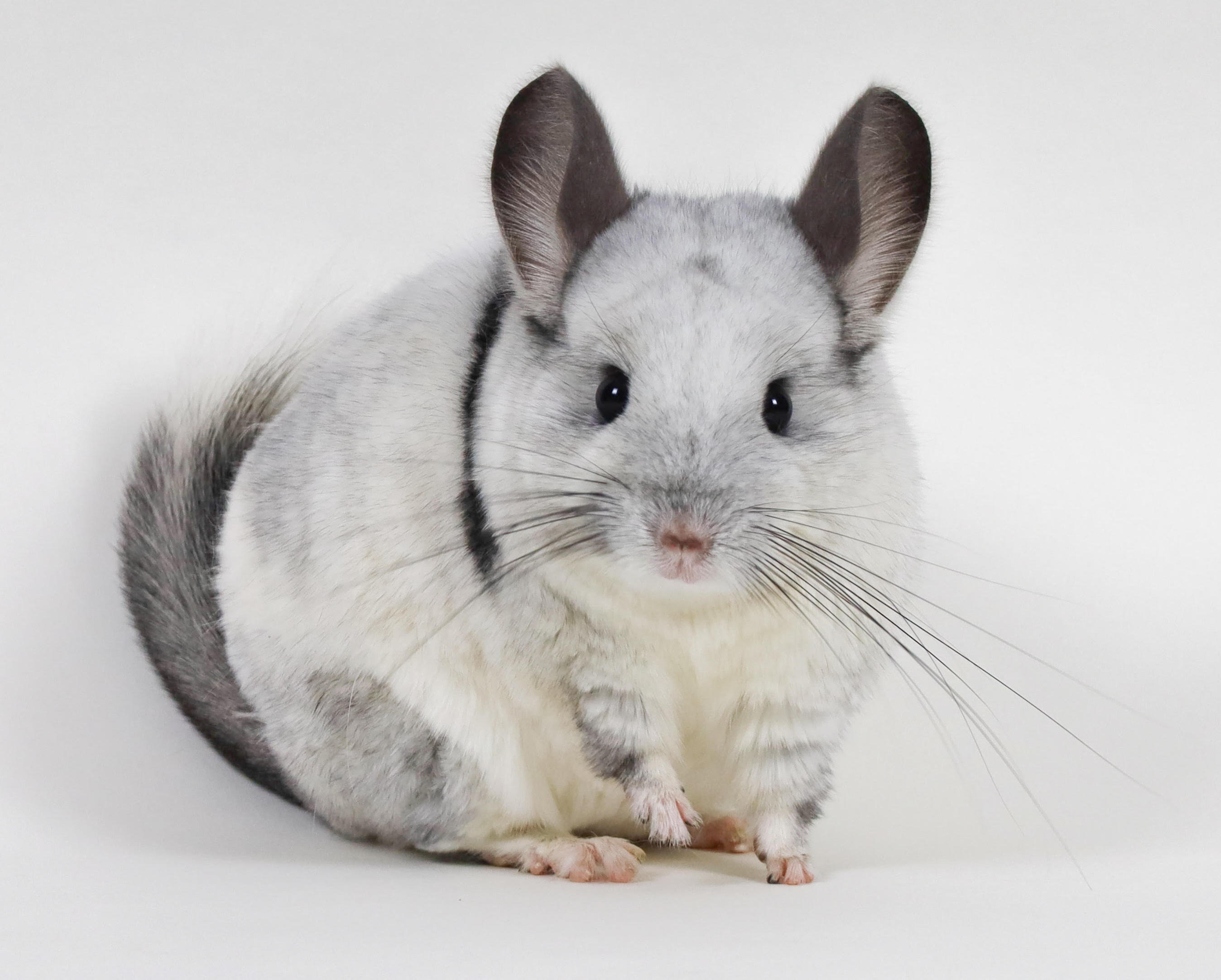
Mosaic chinchilla

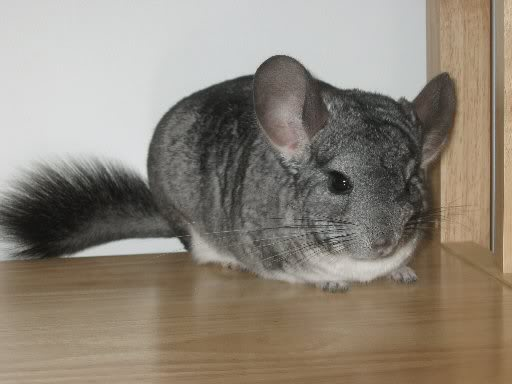
A typical domestic chinchilla

=== In scientific research ===
Chinchillas have been used in research since the 1950s. Since the 1970s, the prime interest in chinchillas by researchers is their auditory system. Other research fields in which chinchillas are used as an animal model include the study of Chagas disease, gastrointestinal diseases, pneumonia, and listeriosis, as well as of Yersinia and Pseudomonas infections.

== Veterinary medicine ==
=== Fractures ===
Chinchillas live active lives and can recover well from minor physical injury. Fractures may be problematic, because chinchillas sit on their hind legs and eat with their front paws, so many types of injuries will disturb their natural eating behavior.

=== Convulsions ===
Chinchilla breeders sometimes report seeing their animals have convulsions. Typically this happens only irregularly and then only for a few seconds, and not more than a few minutes at the most. Convulsions are a symptom that can have many causes, including a brain problem such as hemorrhaging, a vitamin or dietary element deficiency in the diet, low air quality (such as smoke), or some kind of nervous system injury. If convulsions are observed after chinchillas mate then it is likely related to a circulatory problem. Some chinchillas who are kept in groups have stress convulsions during feeding if they see other chinchillas getting food first. Vitamin B, cardiac medication, or a calcium injection may be used to prevent convulsions.

=== Infectious diseases ===
Listeriosis can be transmitted to chinchillas by contaminated food or from other infected animals. In group housing conditions it can be transmitted from infected chinchillas to the community as a digestive tract disease. Pasteurella can be contracted from food and then transmitted among a group of chinchillas. Symptoms include apathy, digestive disorder, and fever. Pseudomonas aeruginosa infections are widely distributed in nature and can affect chinchillas like many other animals. They can cause wide deaths in populations of chinchillas and spontaneous abortion in pregnant chinchillas.

Respiratory tract infections can be caused by many pathogens, but, regardless of cause, usually result in difficult breathing and a nasal discharge. Young chinchilla are more likely to be affected and these infections are unlikely to result in an epidemic, even if transmissible.

Gastrointestinal disorders are observed as either constipation or diarrhea. These are almost always the result of a problem with the diet, but if the diet is optimal, they could be the symptom of an infectious disease. Constipation in chinchillas is difficult to observe in groups because it may not be obvious that an animal is not contributing to the population's waste. If it is identified, mild treatments include feeding paraffin to soften the feces.

=== Temperament ===
Chinchillas are easily distressed, and when they are unhappy, they may exhibit physical symptoms. A common indicator of stress in pet chinchillas is fur-chewing (or fur barbering), an excessive grooming behavior that results in uneven patches of fur; chinchillas may chew their own fur or that of their cagemates. Fur-chewing can sometimes be alleviated through changes in living environment, but is regarded by some experts to be passed genetically from parents to offspring. Usually, fur-chewing itself is a benign symptom that does not cause physiological distress.

Sick chinchillas may stop eating if they are stressed, which can make them even weaker. Chinchillas that live in communities are especially sensitive in their breeding seasons of February to March and August to September. Chinchillas are social animals and are likely to be upset to have their breeding mate changed in breeding season. They are known to be disturbed by a change of diet in these times.

=== Pharmaceutical treatment ===
Chinchillas may be treated with chloramphenicol, neomycin, or spectinomycin for digestive problems. Sulfonamides dissolved in drinking water may be used. Colistin can be an effective antibiotic.
