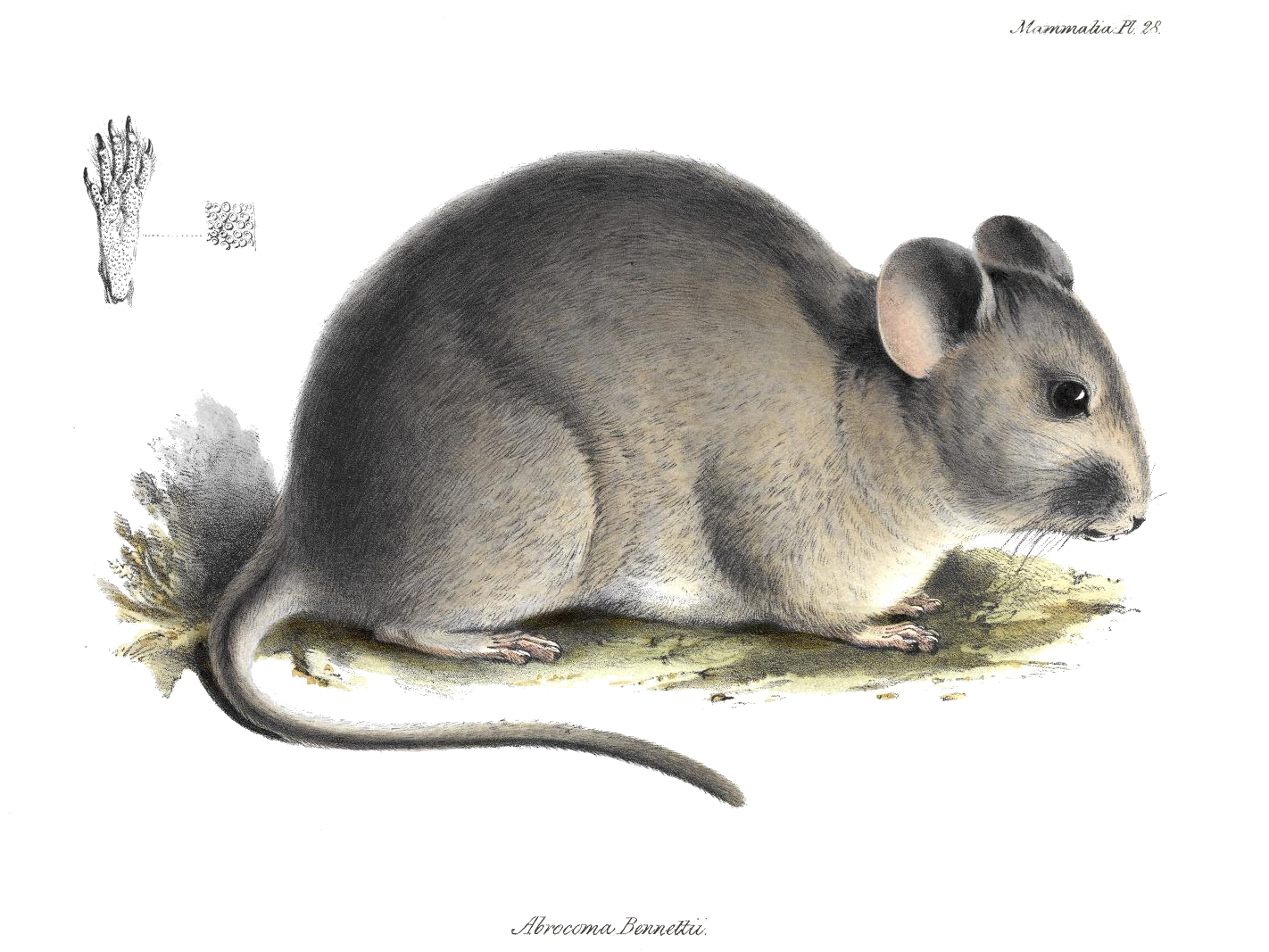
- Abrocoma bennettii

Scientific classification
- Kingdom: Animalia
- Phylum: Chordata
- Class: Mammalia
- Order: Rodentia
- Family: Abrocomidae
- Genus: Abrocoma; Waterhouse, 1837

Type species
- Abrocoma bennettii Waterhouse, 1837

Species
- See text
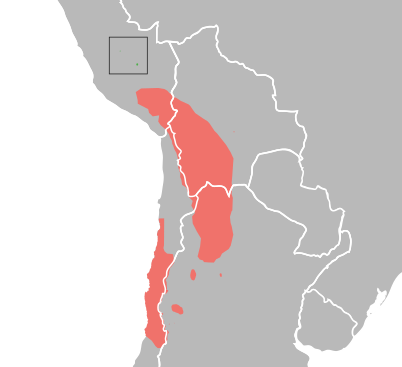
- Abrocomidae distribution. Abrocoma in red; Cuscomys in green in box.

= Abrocoma =

Genus of rodents

Abrocoma is a genus of abrocomid rodents found in the Andes of South America, from southern Peru to central Chile. The genus contains eight species, most of which are found in isolated mountain ranges in northwestern Argentina. The oldest fossil record for the Caviomorpha appears at the late Eocene-Early Oligocene transition (37.5–31.5 mybp). The Abrocoma has an interesting body structure for example within its own head it has a sac that contains a liquid that is not named by Janet K. Braun and Michael A. Mares(894). They also have feet that are padded which helped to completely say with certainty that it is a rock dweller but also a rock climber.(896).

== Species ==
- Genus Abrocoma
  - A. bennettii - Bennett's chinchilla rat
  - A. boliviensis - Bolivian chinchilla rat
  - A. budini - Budin's chinchilla rat
  - A. cinerea - ashy chinchilla rat
  - A. famatina - Famatina chinchilla rat
  - A. schistacea - Sierra del Tontal chinchilla rat
  - A. uspallata - Uspallata chinchilla rat
  - A. vaccarum - Punta de Vacas chinchilla rat or Mendozan chinchilla rat

Additionally, the species Cuscomys oblativus was formerly classified as A. oblativus, but has been reassigned.
