= Ashy chinchilla rat =

Conservation status
- Least Concern (IUCN 3.1)

Scientific classification
- Kingdom: Animalia
- Phylum: Chordata
- Class: Mammalia
- Order: Rodentia
- Family: Abrocomidae
- Genus: Abrocoma
- Species: A. cinerea

Binomial name
- Abrocoma cinerea Thomas, 1919

Species of rodent

The ashy chinchilla rat (Abrocoma cinerea) is a species of chinchilla rats in the family Abrocomidae found in Argentina, Bolivia, Chile, and Peru.

== Description ==
Their total length is 21–43 centimetres (8.3–16.9 in), with the body being 15–25 centimetres (5.9–9.8 in) and the tail being 6–8 centimetres (2.4–3.1 in). They have soft, thick, silver fur on the top of their bodies, and white or yellow fur on their abdomens. They have four toes on their front feet, and five toes on their back feet.

== Distribution and habitat ==
The ashy chinchilla rat is endemic to land at high elevations in southeastern Peru, southwestern Bolivia, northern Chile and northwestern Argentina. Its altitudinal range is from about 3,850 to 5,000 metres (12,600 to 16,400 ft) above sea level. It lives in rocky areas, digging its burrows at the base of bushes, under rocks, among shale or at the base of stone walls.

== Behavior and diet ==
Ashy chinchilla rats live underground, with a group of up to six individuals occupying one burrow. Several colonial burrows may be grouped close together. Little is known of their breeding habits but the gestation period is about 118 days and one or two young are born at a time.

They are herbivores, so they eat seeds, fruit, and nuts, especially Thola spp. and Yareta. They are sociable animals and make squeaking and grunting noises when they are scared or fighting, and gurgling sounds when grooming each other.

== Status ==
Ashy chinchilla rats are sometimes hunted for their pelts, which are sold in local markets, sometimes to tourists. They have a large range and are plentiful within that area. The population is presumed to be large and the population trend is steady. The animals are able to adapt to some degree of habitat modification and the International Union for Conservation of Nature has rated their conservation status as being of "least concern".
