= List of plant genus names with etymologies (Q–Z) =

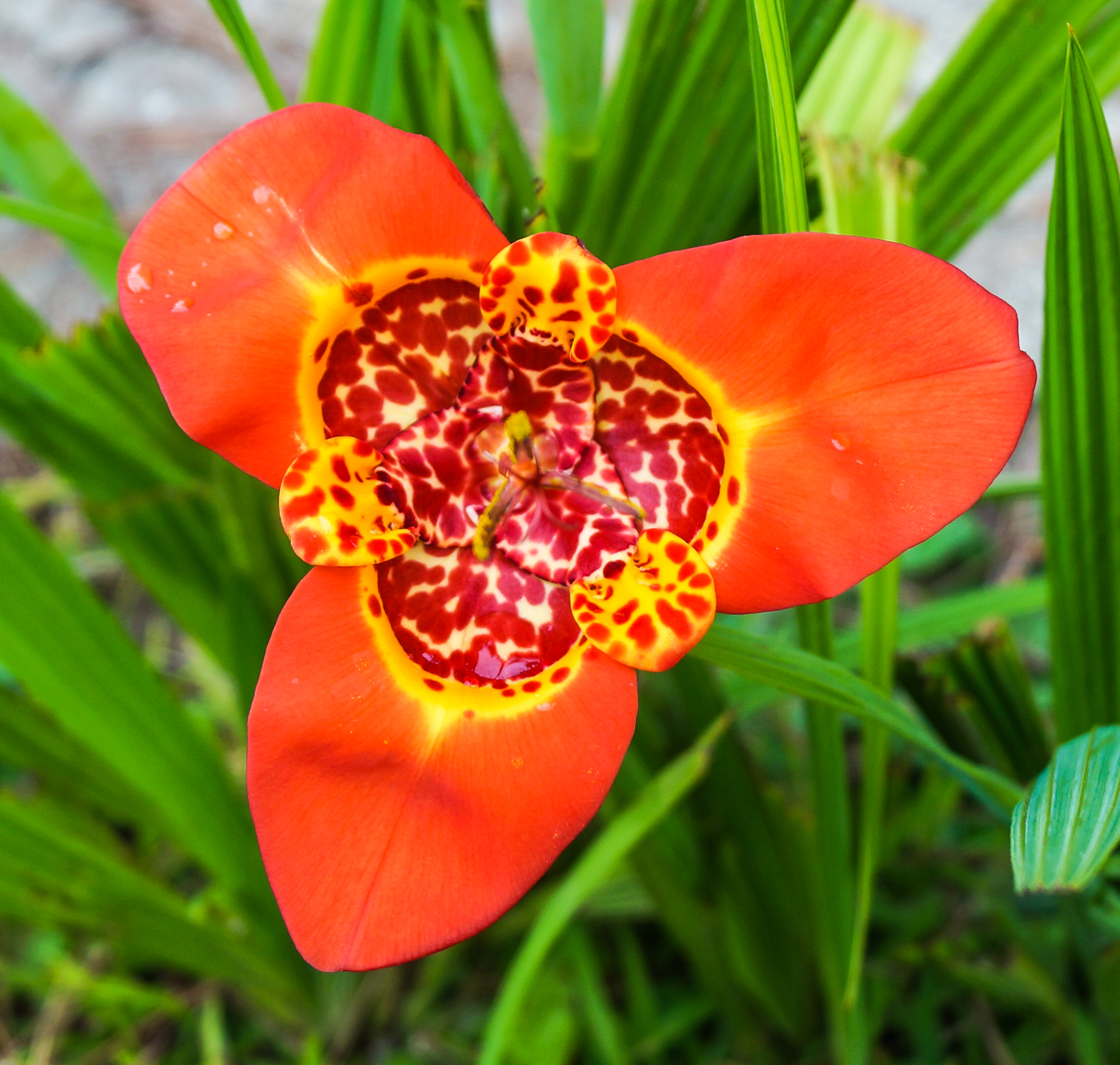
Tigridia (from Latin for "tiger")

Since the first printing of Carl Linnaeus's Species Plantarum in 1753, plants have been assigned one epithet or name for their species and one name for their genus, a grouping of related species. Many of these plants are listed in Stearn's Dictionary of Plant Names for Gardeners. William Stearn (1911–2001) was one of the pre-eminent British botanists of the 20th century: a Librarian of the Royal Horticultural Society, a president of the Linnean Society and the original drafter of the International Code of Nomenclature for Cultivated Plants.

The first column below contains seed-bearing genera from Stearn and other sources as listed, excluding names with missing derivations and those names that no longer appear in more modern works, such as Plants of the World by Maarten J. M. Christenhusz (lead author), Michael F. Fay and Mark W. Chase. Plants of the World is also used for the family and order classification for each genus. The second column gives a meaning or derivation of the word, such as a language of origin. The last two columns indicate additional citations.

== Key ==
Latin: = derived from Latin (otherwise Greek, except as noted)
Ba = listed in Ross Bayton's The Gardener's Botanical
Bu = listed in Lotte Burkhardt's Index of Eponymic Plant Names
CS = listed in both Allen Coombes's The A to Z of Plant Names and Stearn's Dictionary of Plant Names for Gardeners
G = listed in David Gledhill's The Names of Plants
St = listed in Stearn's Dictionary of Plant Names for Gardeners

== Genera ==
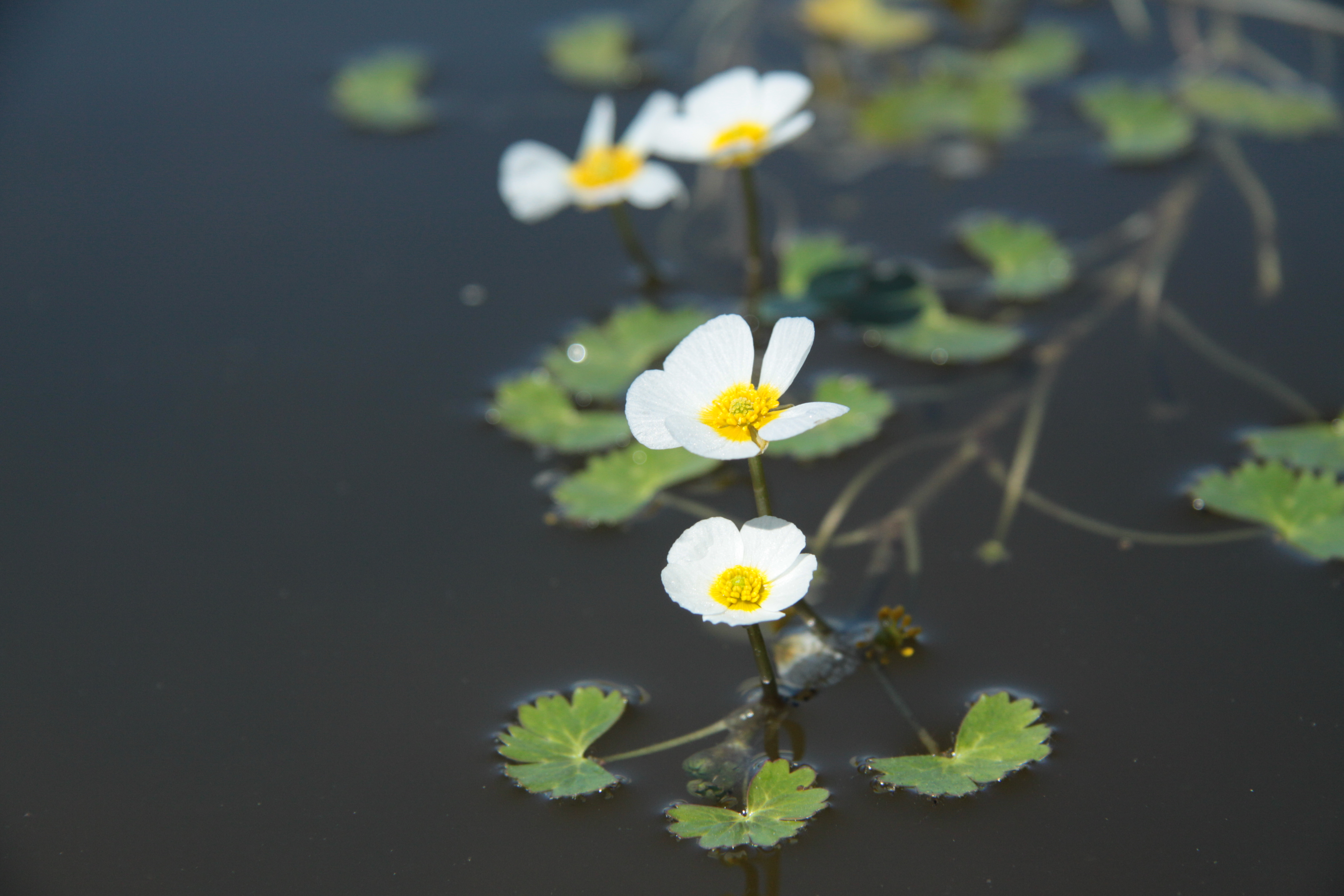
Ranunculus

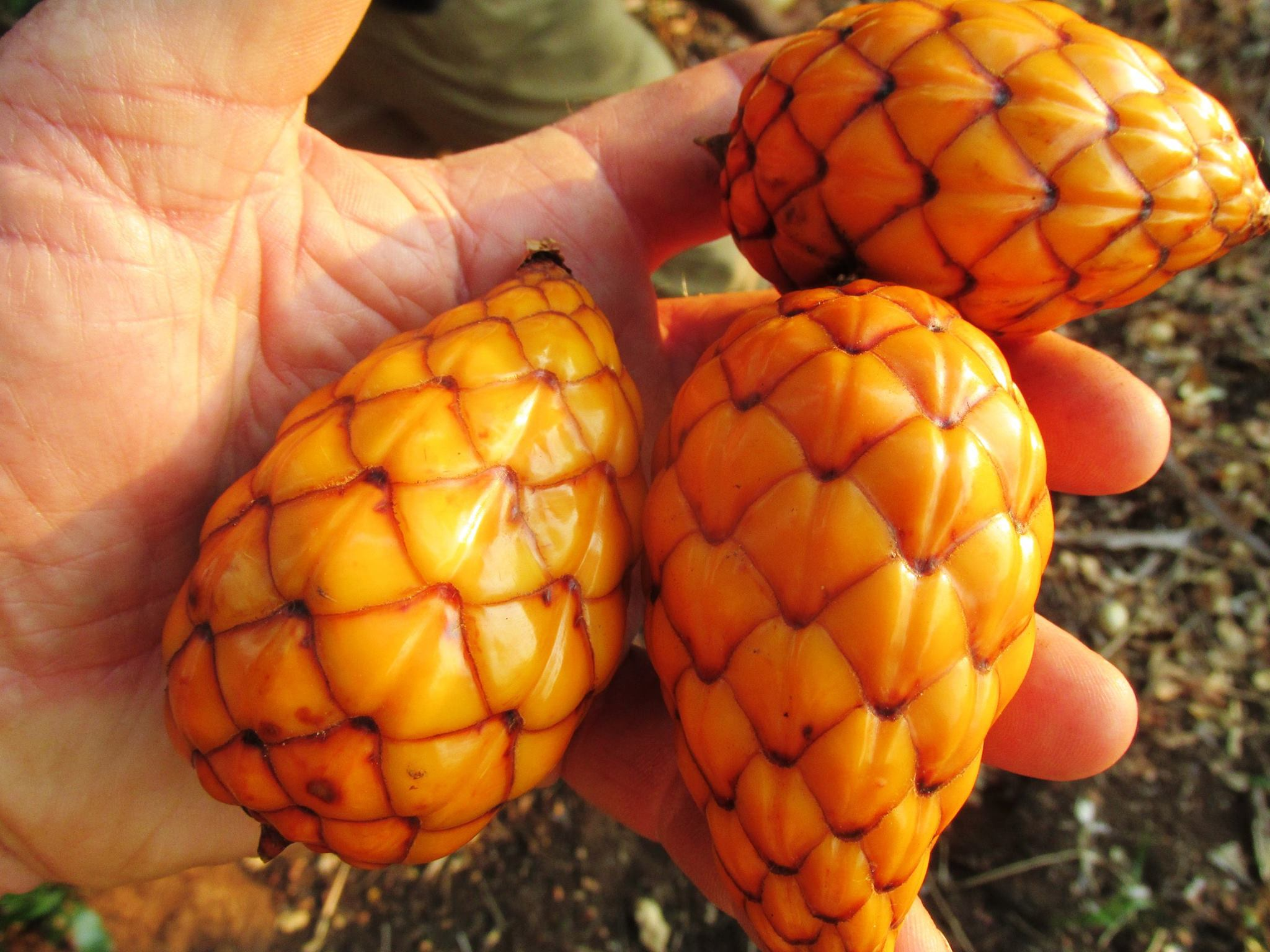
Raphia

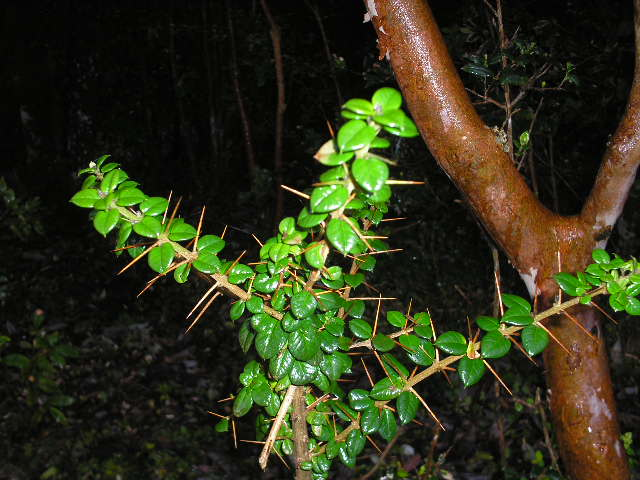
Rhaphithamnus

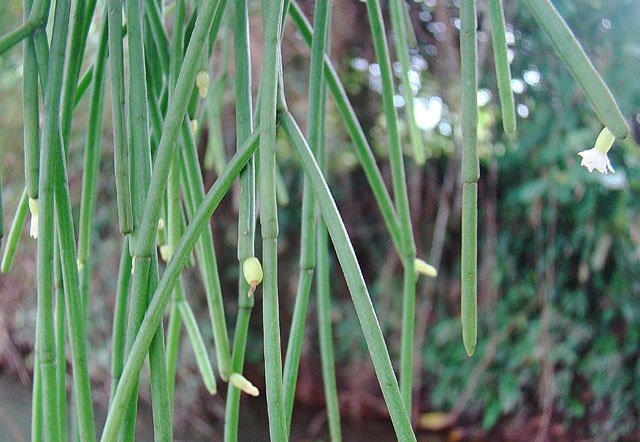
Rhipsalis

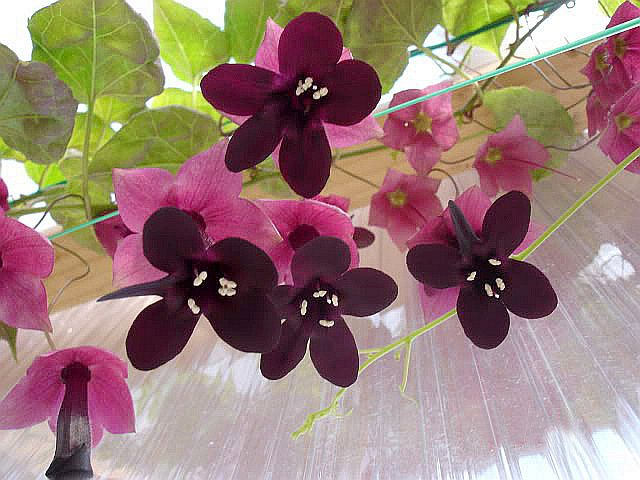
Rhodochiton

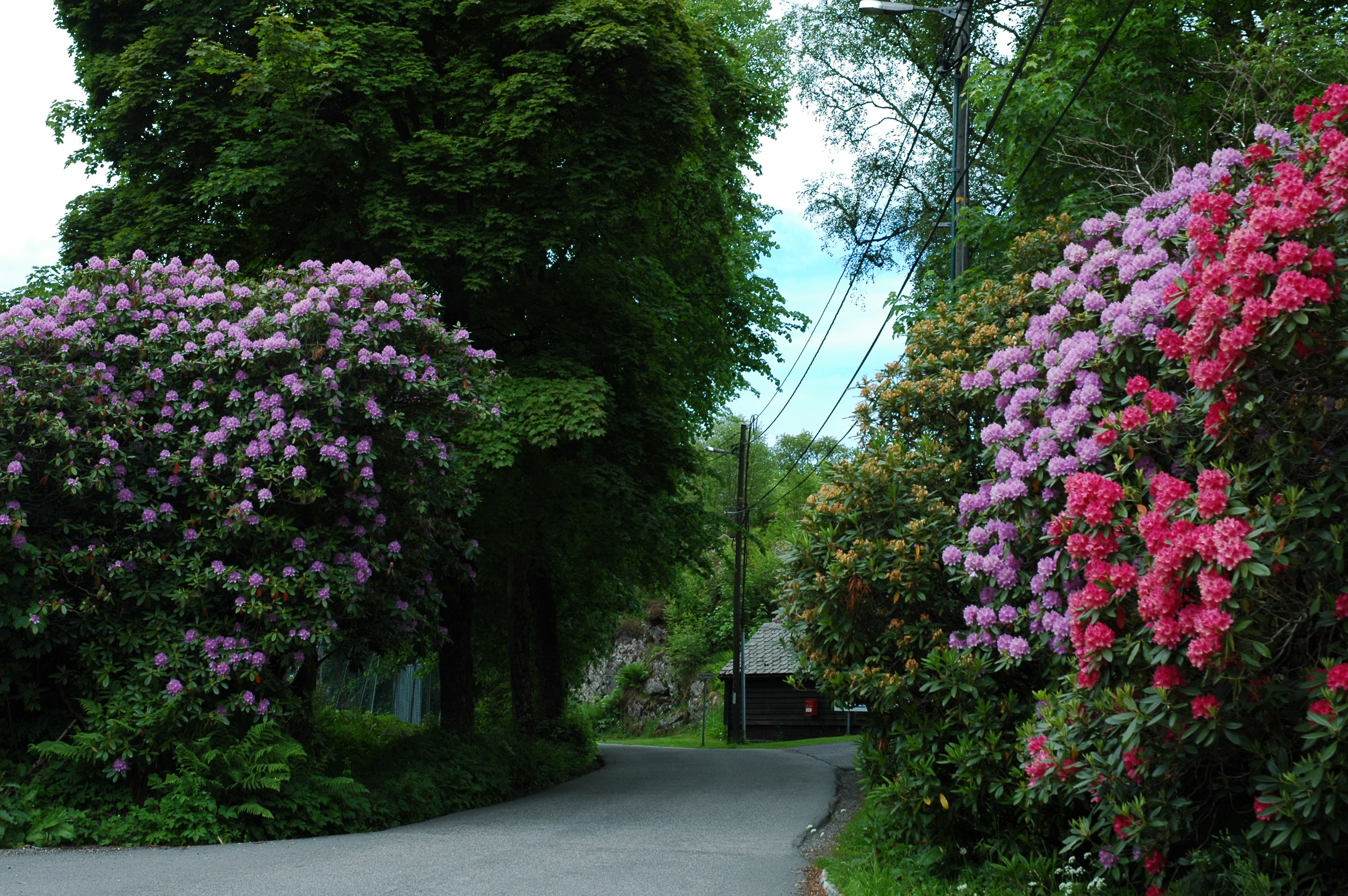
Rhododendron

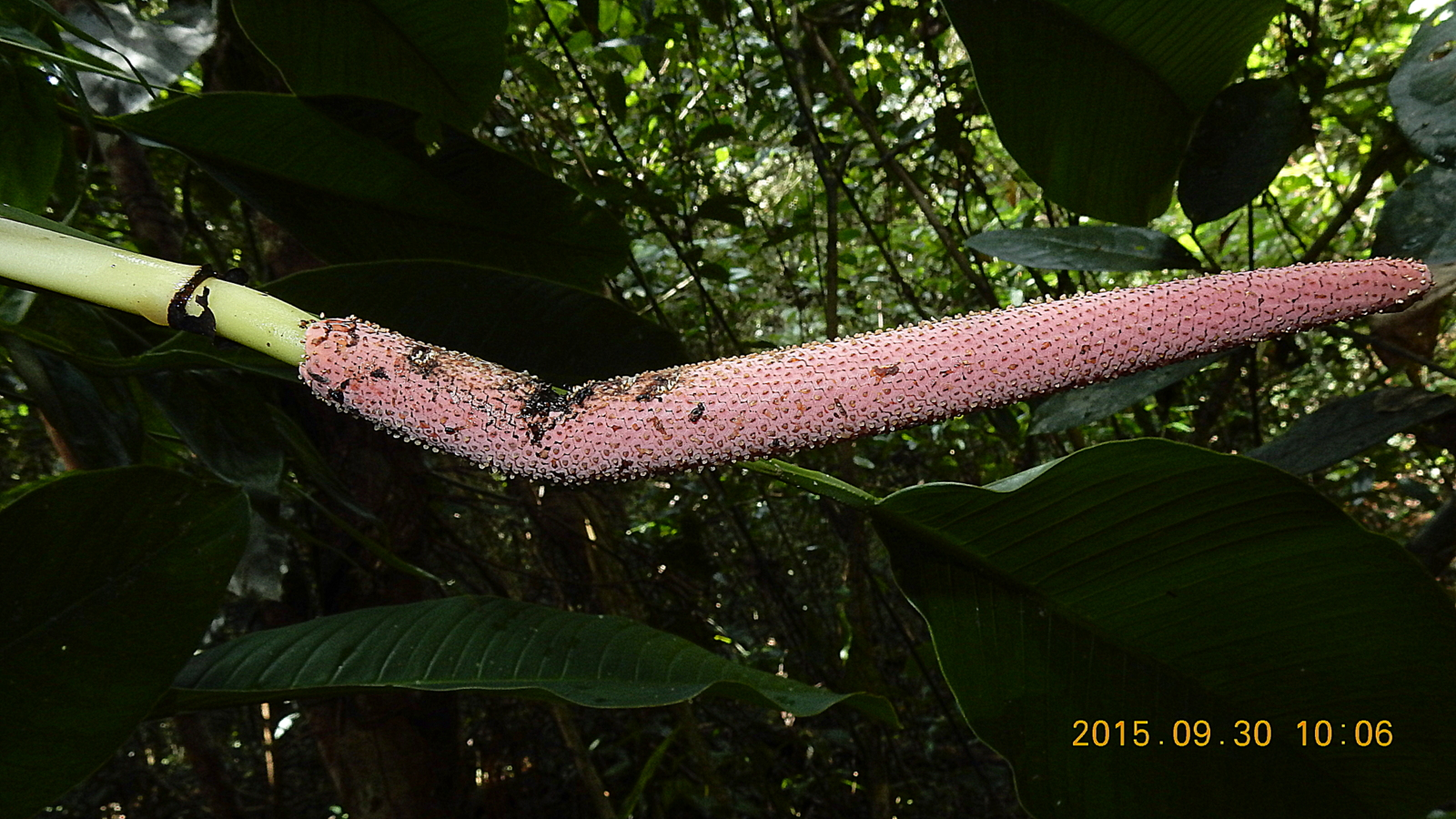
Rhodospatha

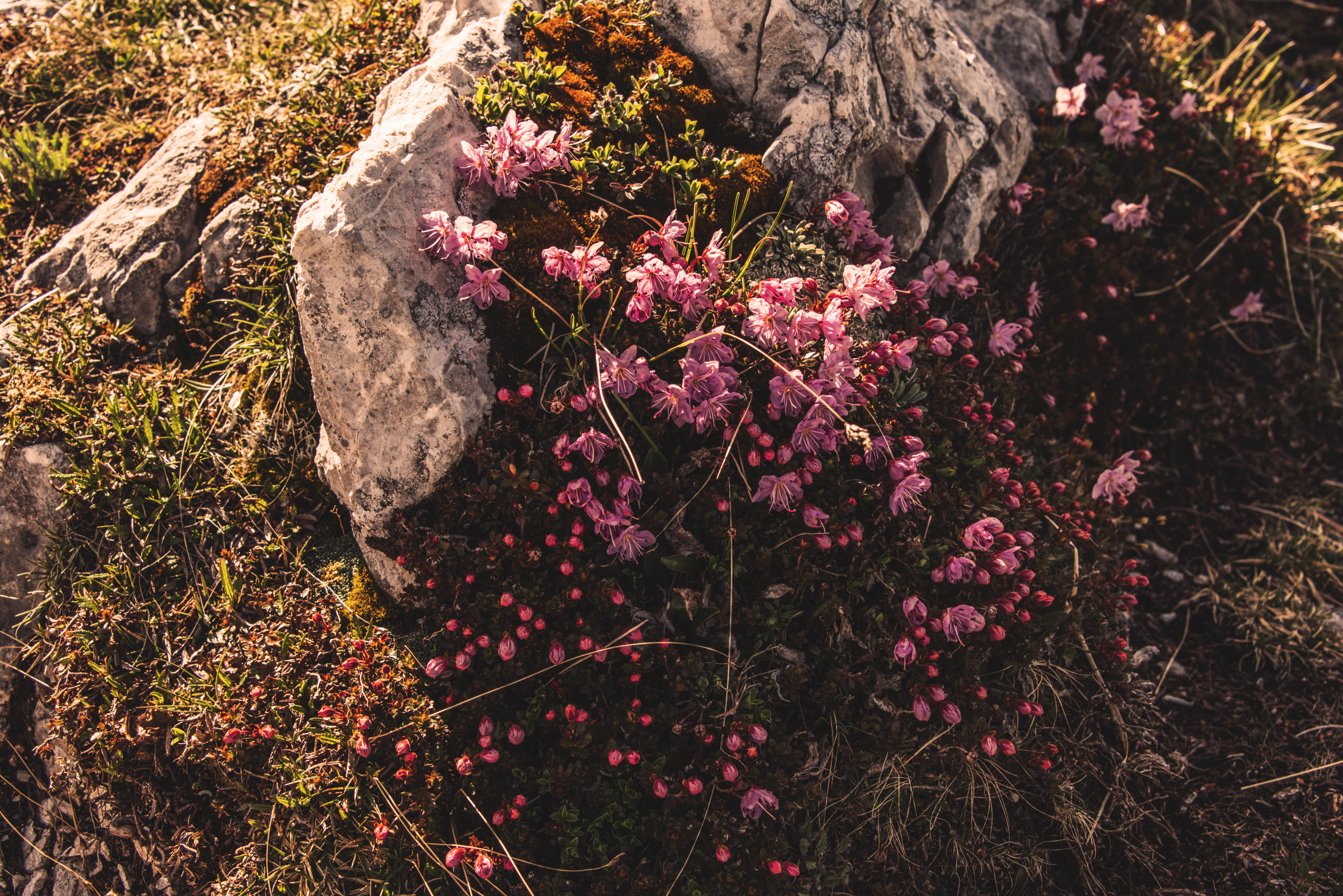
Rhodothamnus

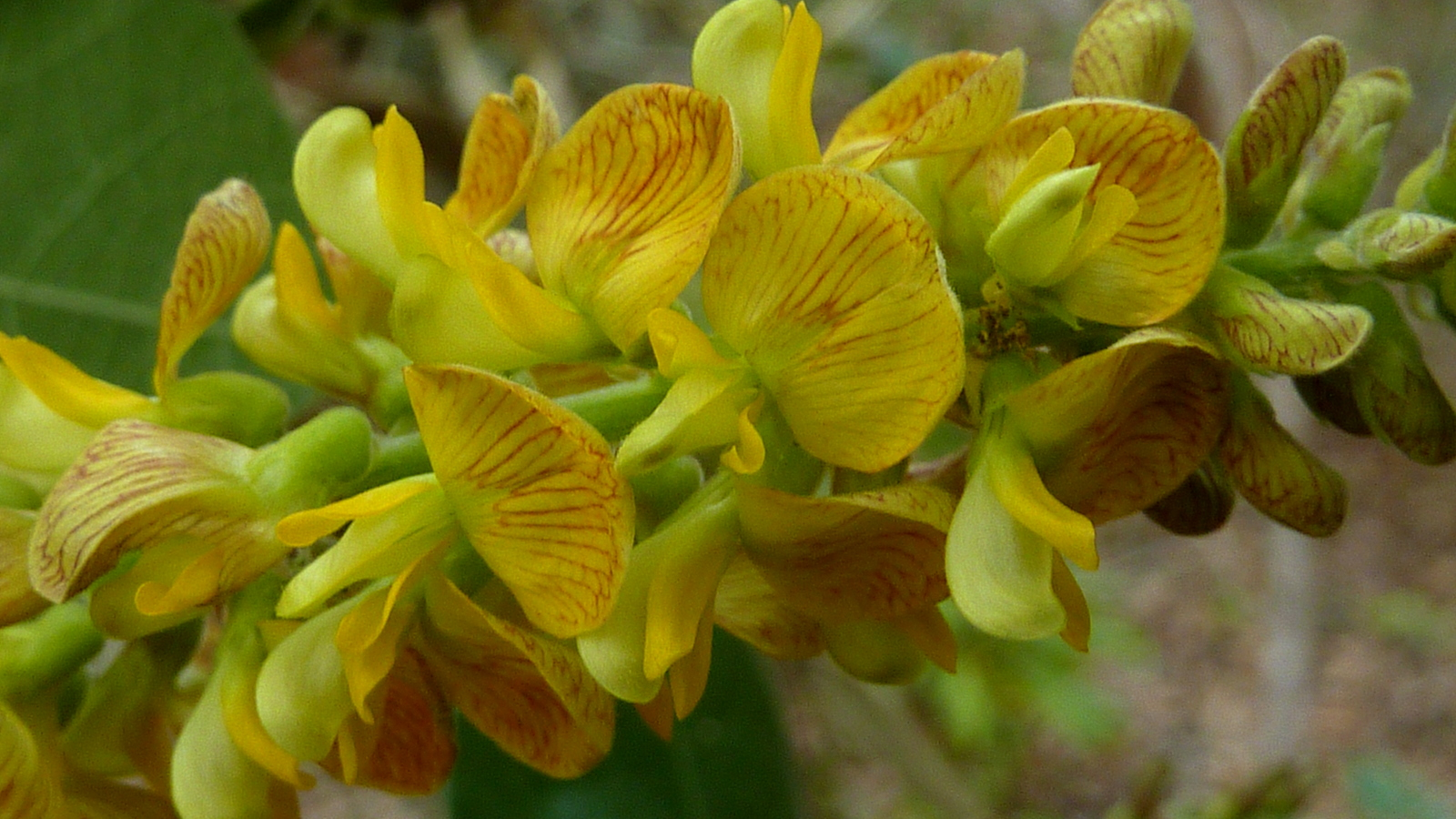
Rhynchosia

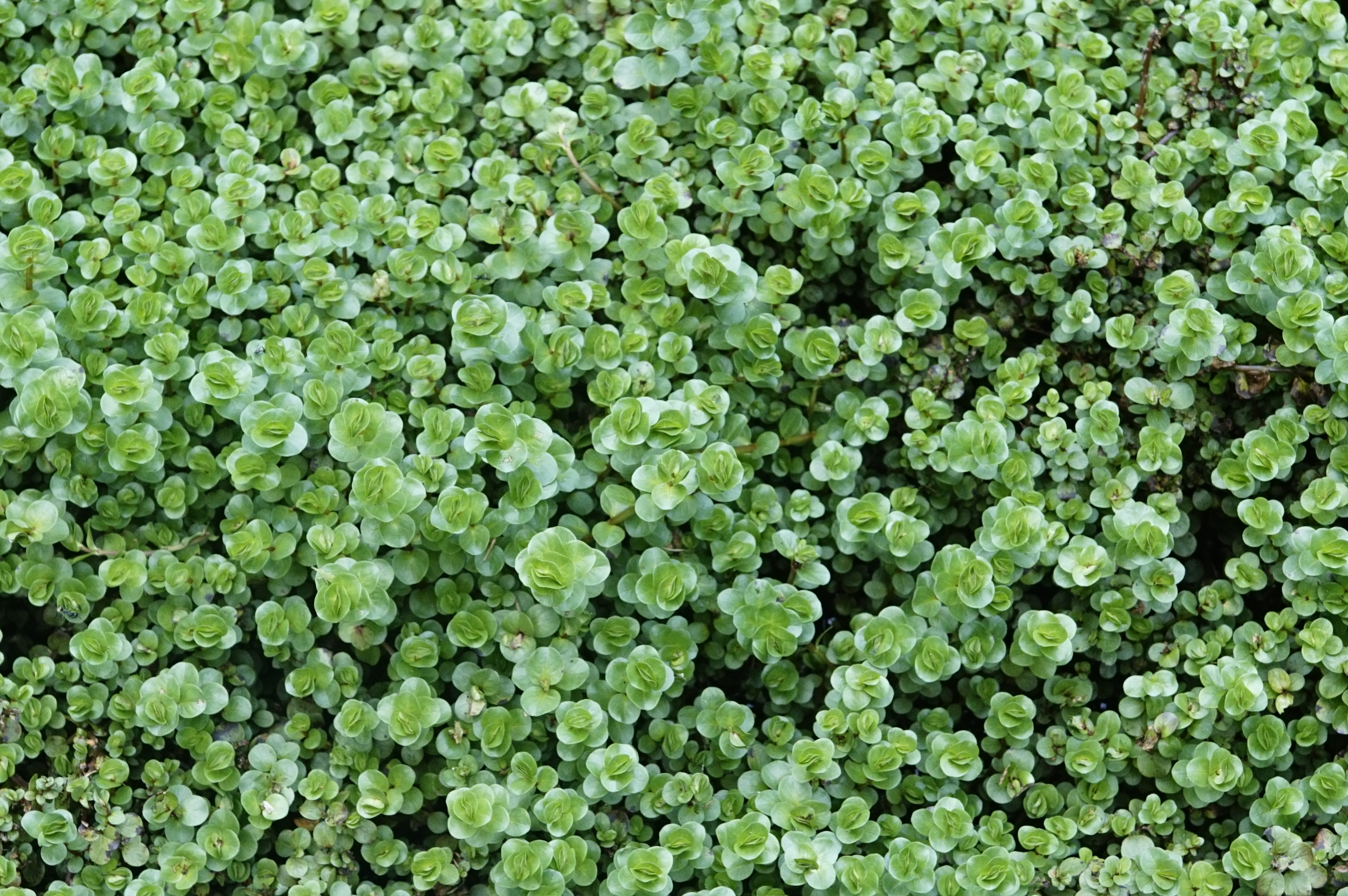
Rotala

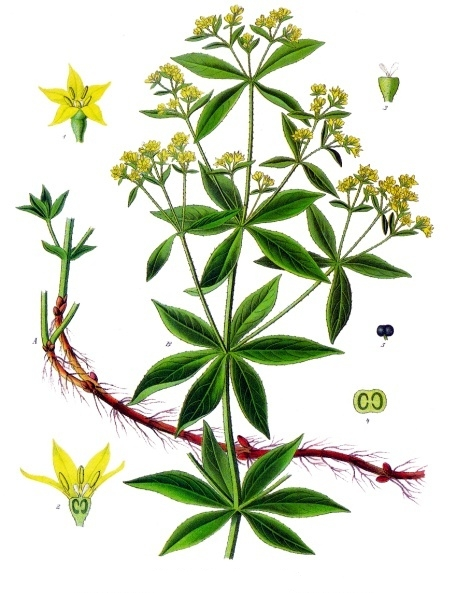
Rubia illustration

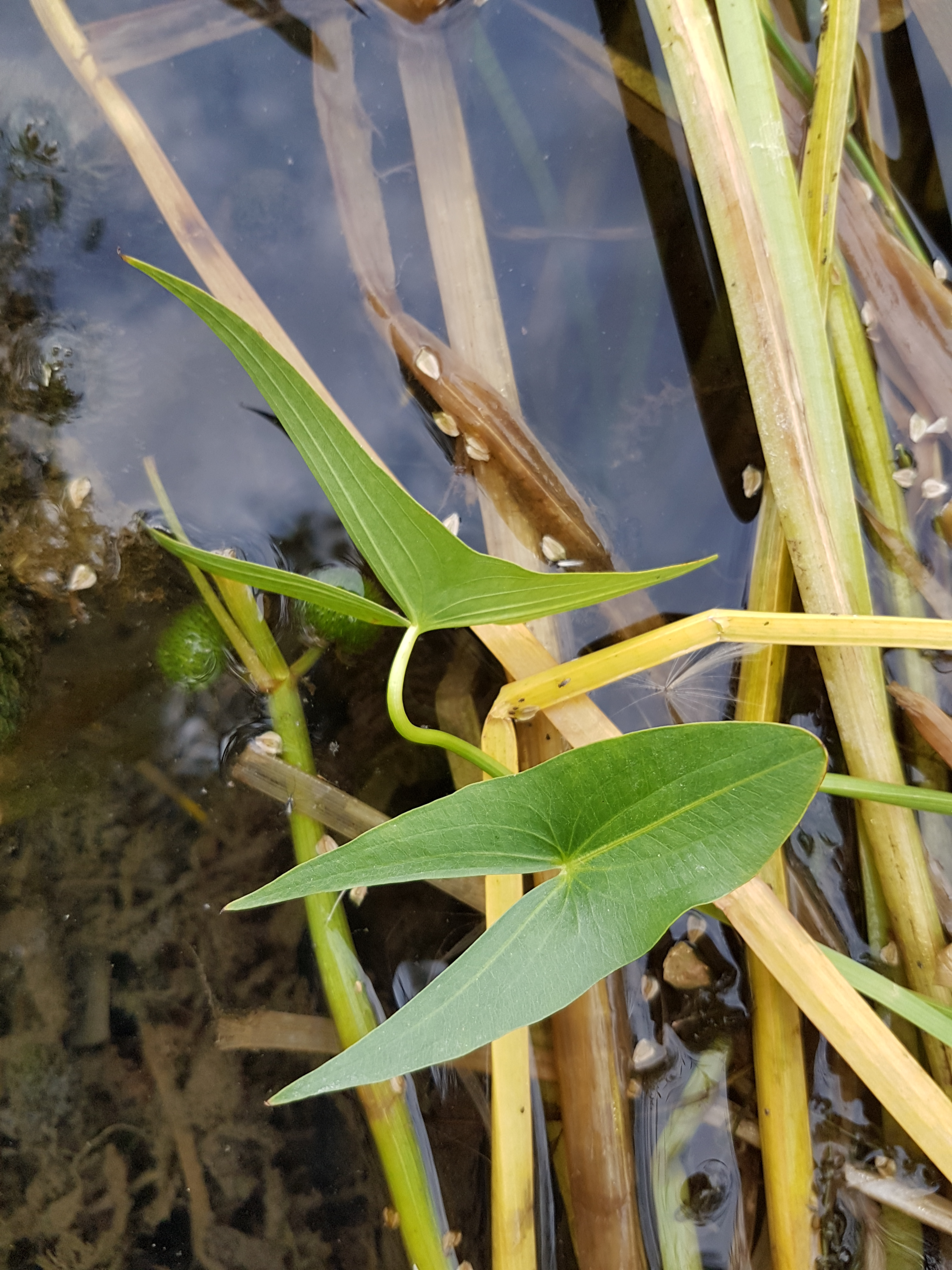
Sagittaria

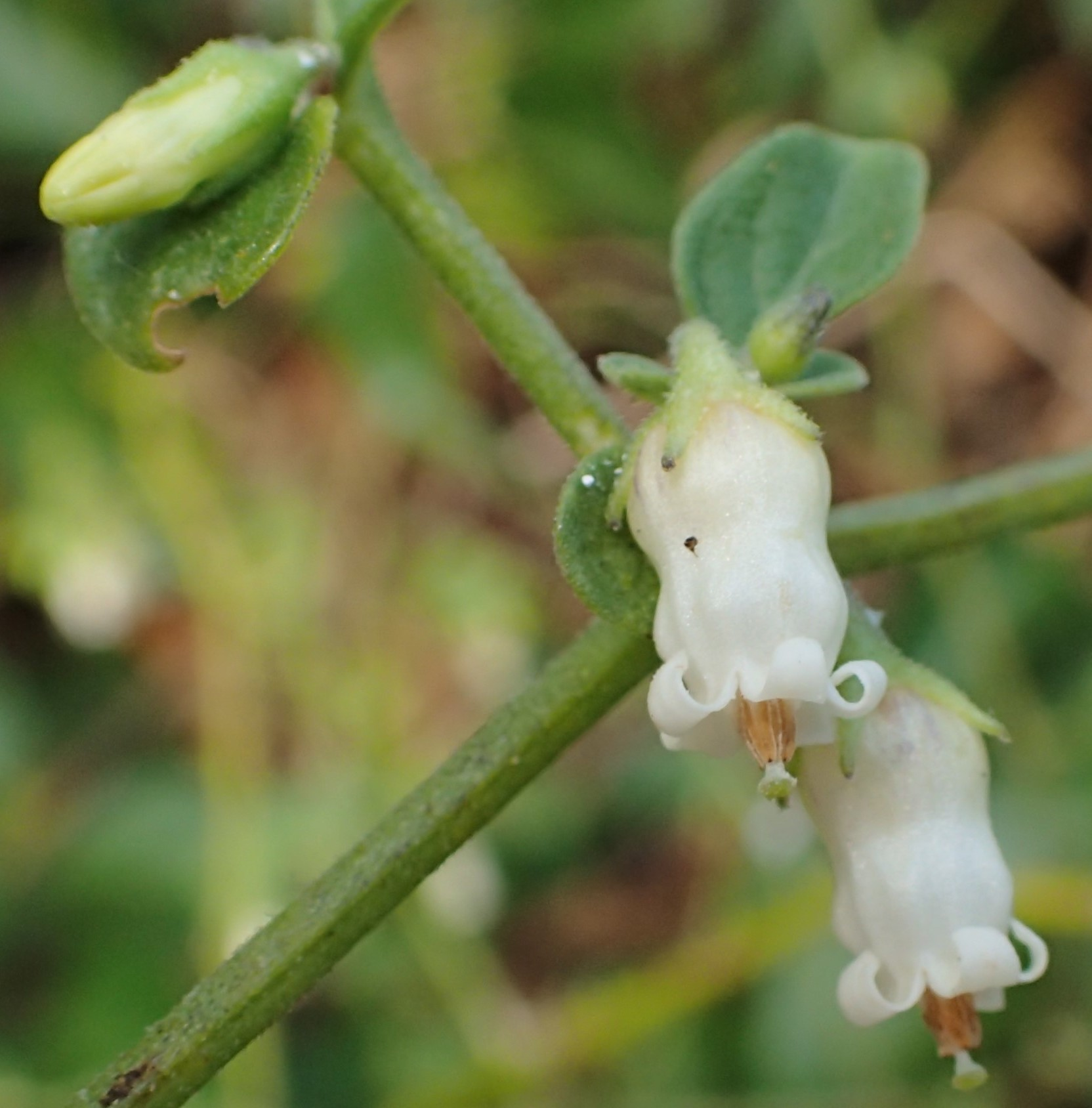
Salpichroa

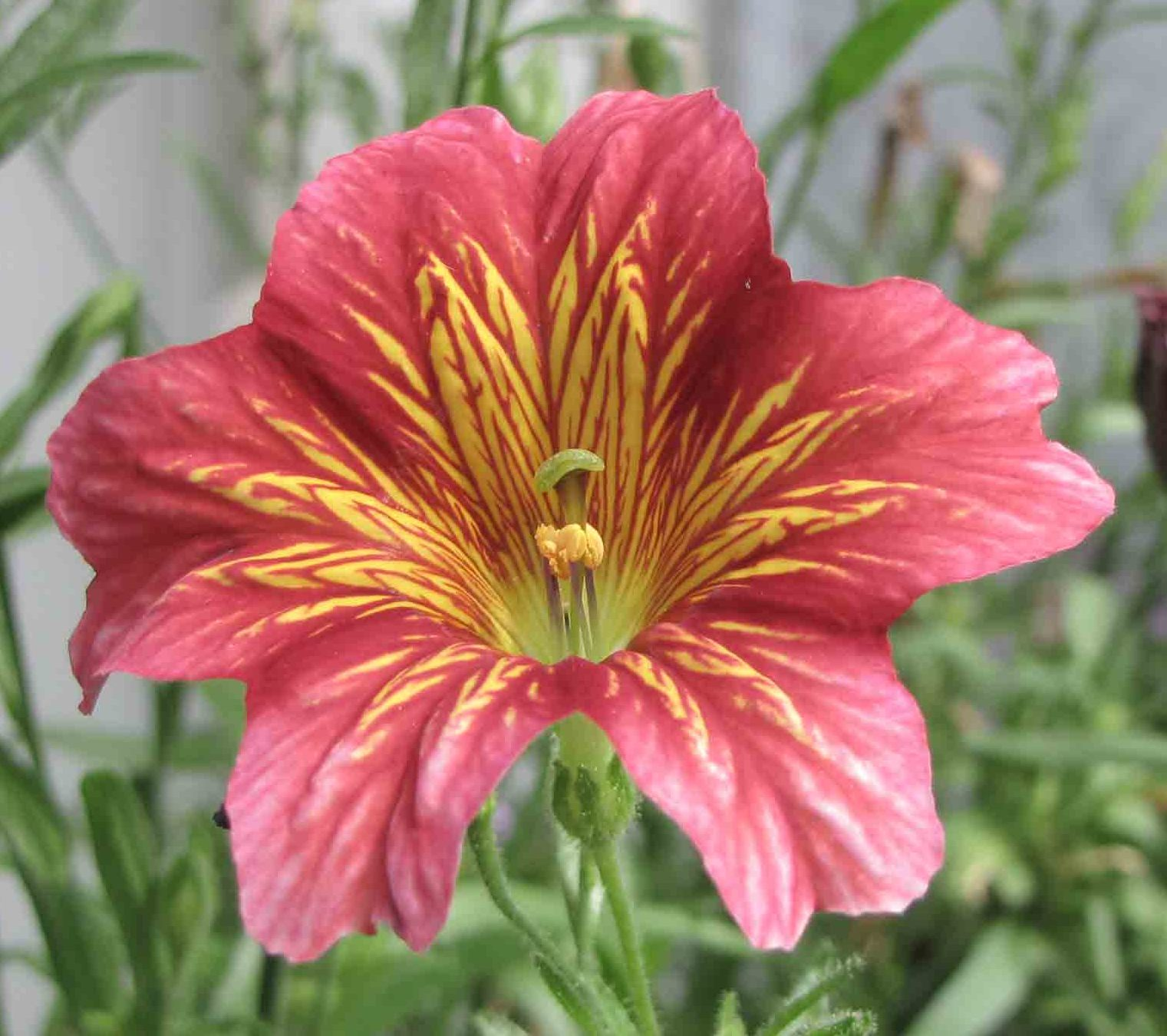
Salpiglossis

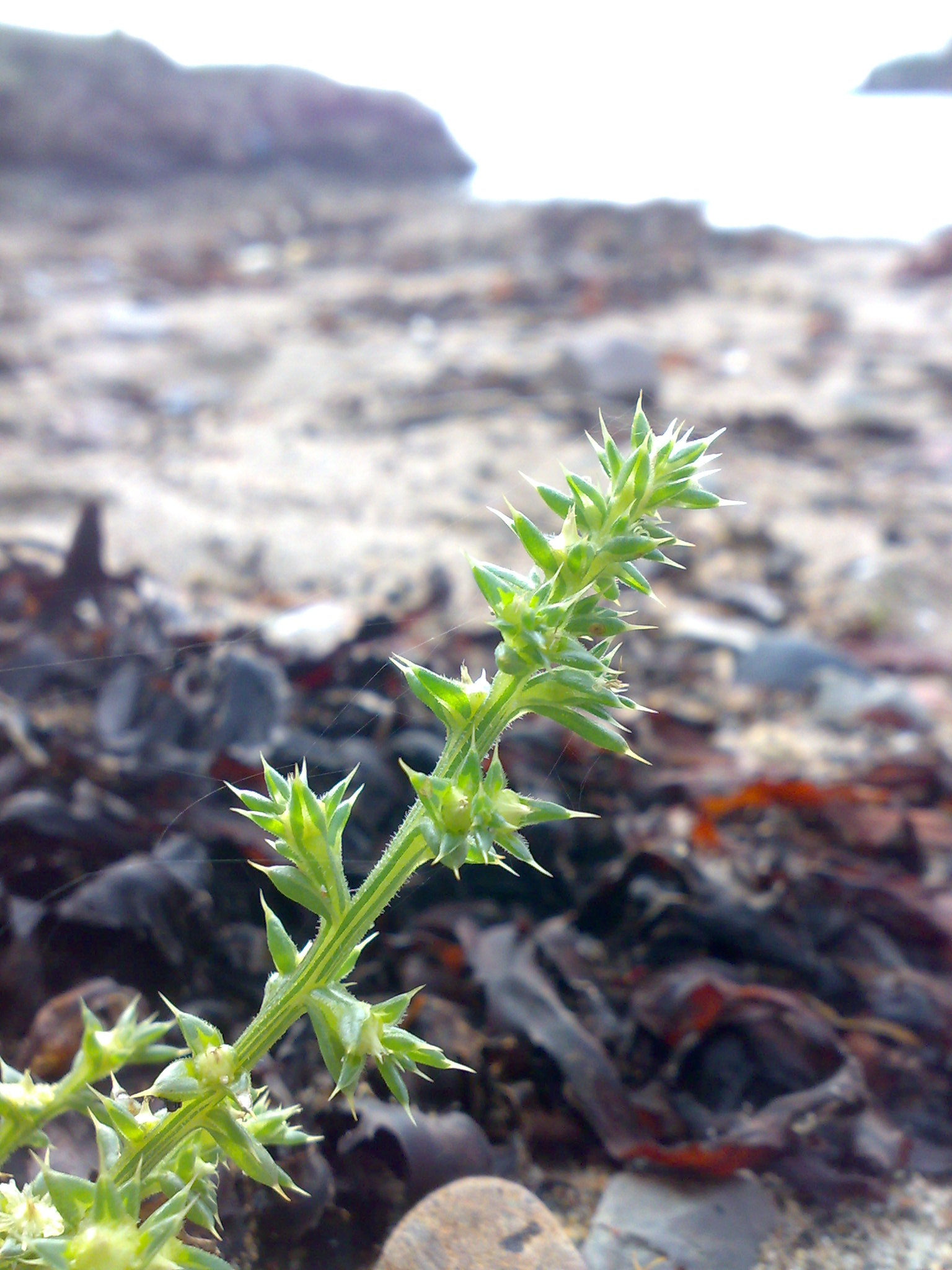
Salsola

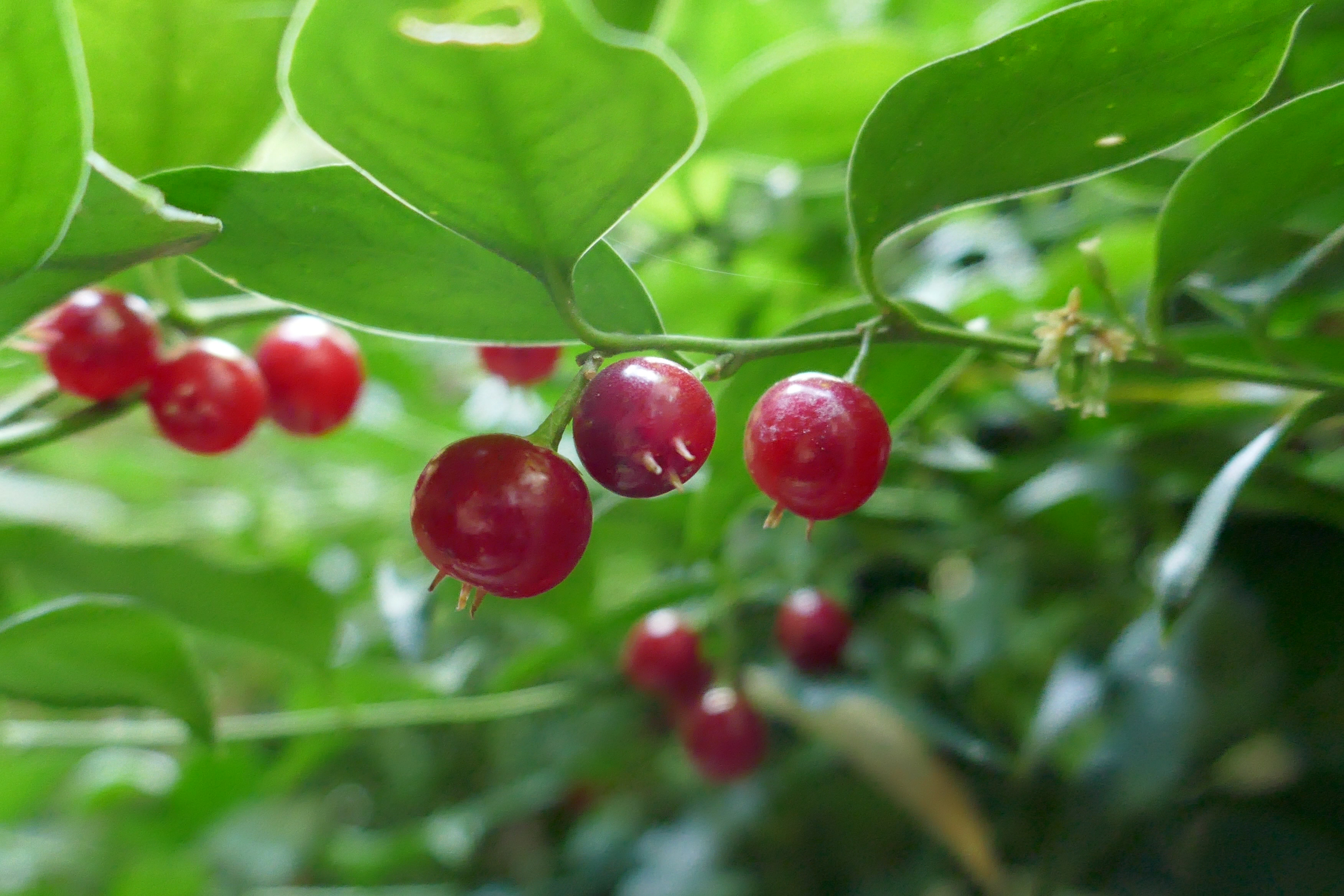
Sarcococca

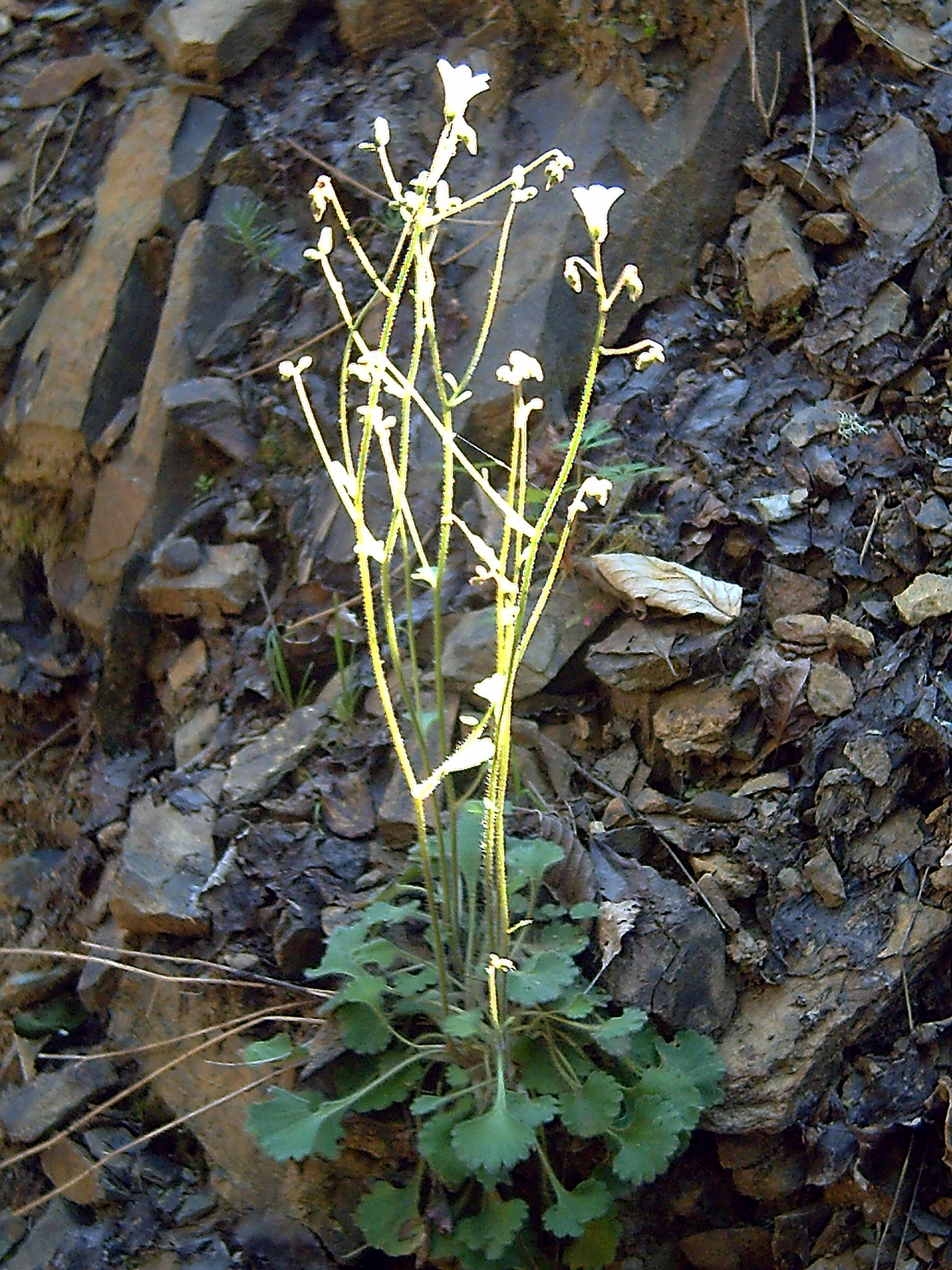
Saxifraga

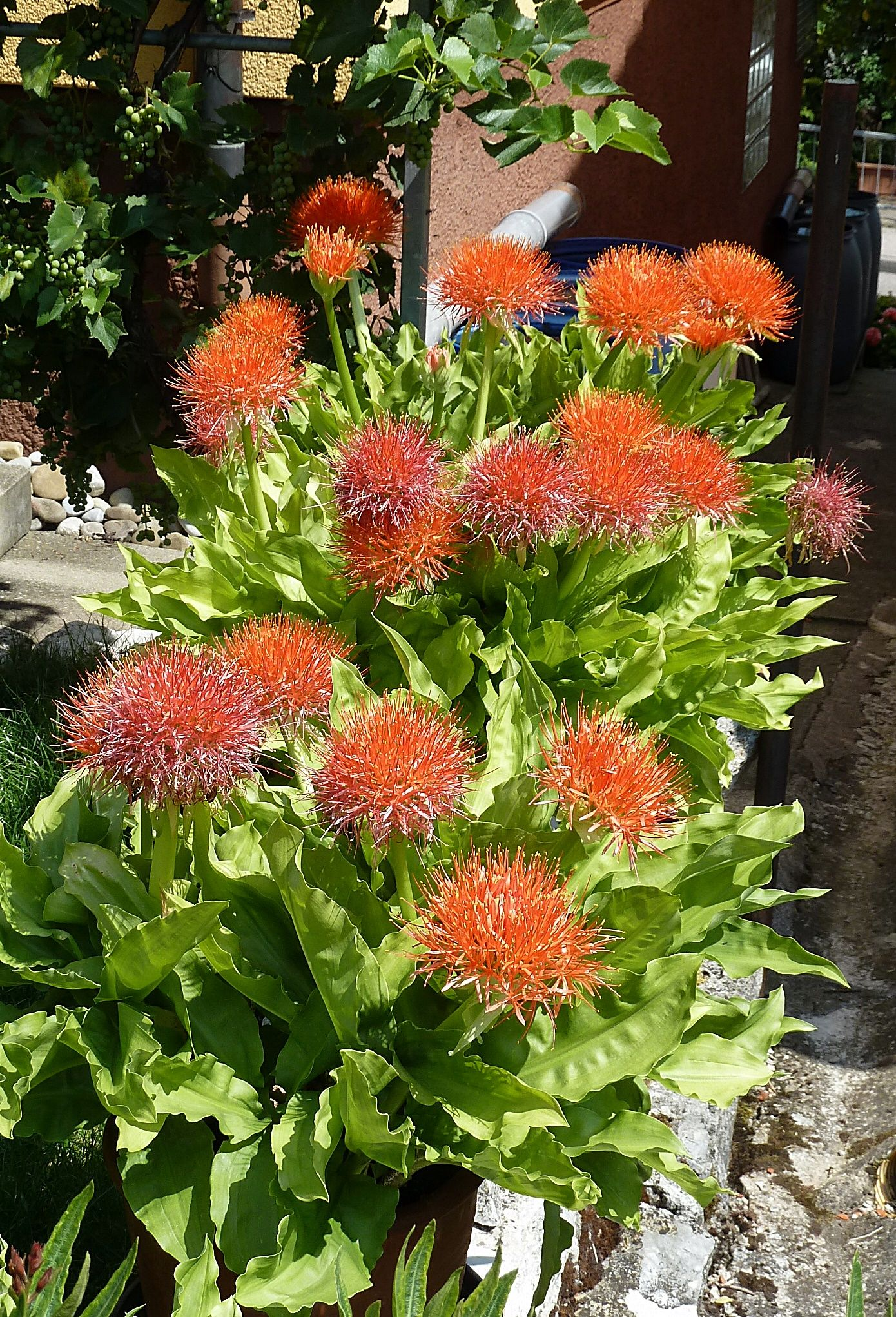
Scadoxus

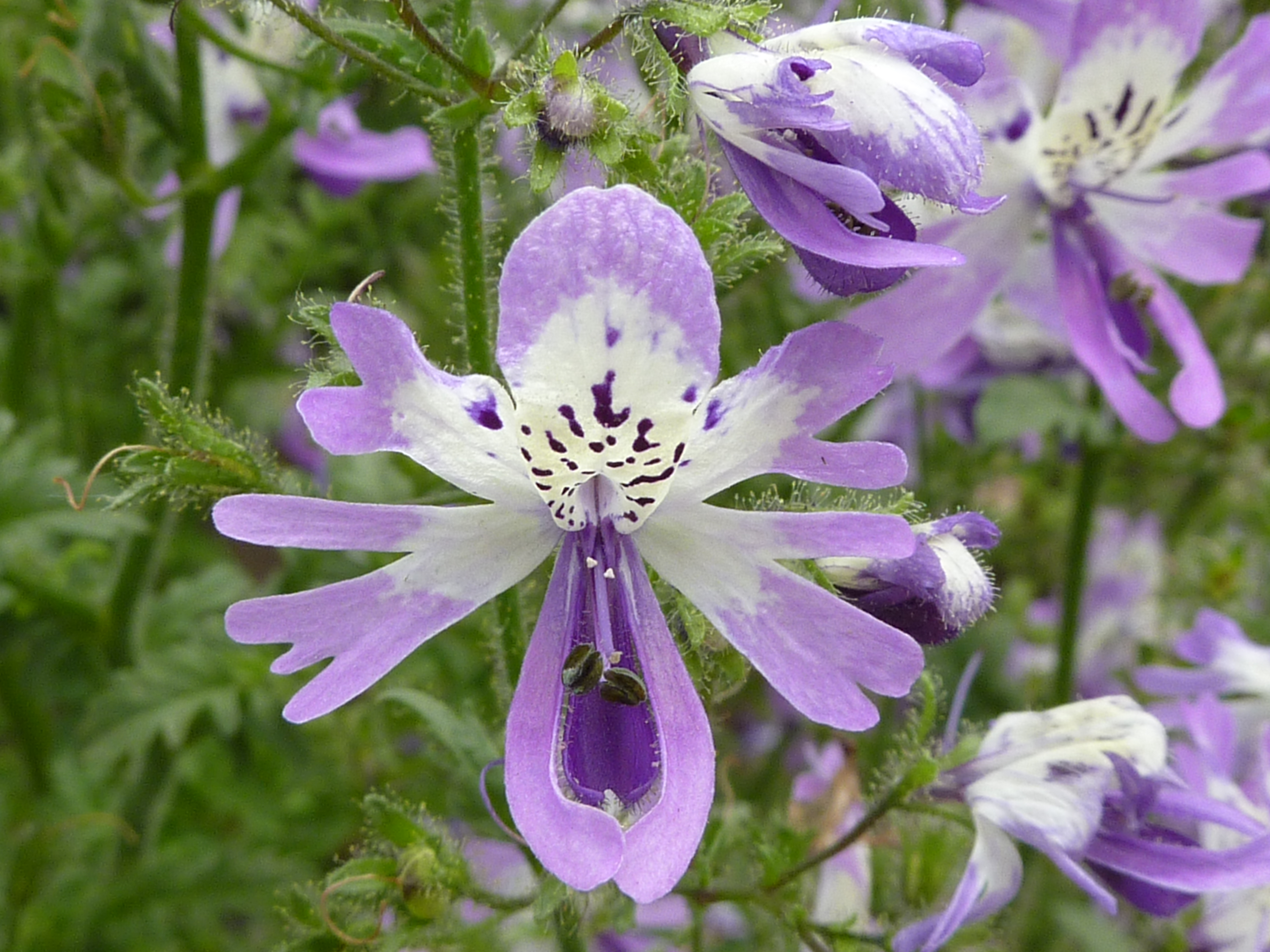
Schizanthus

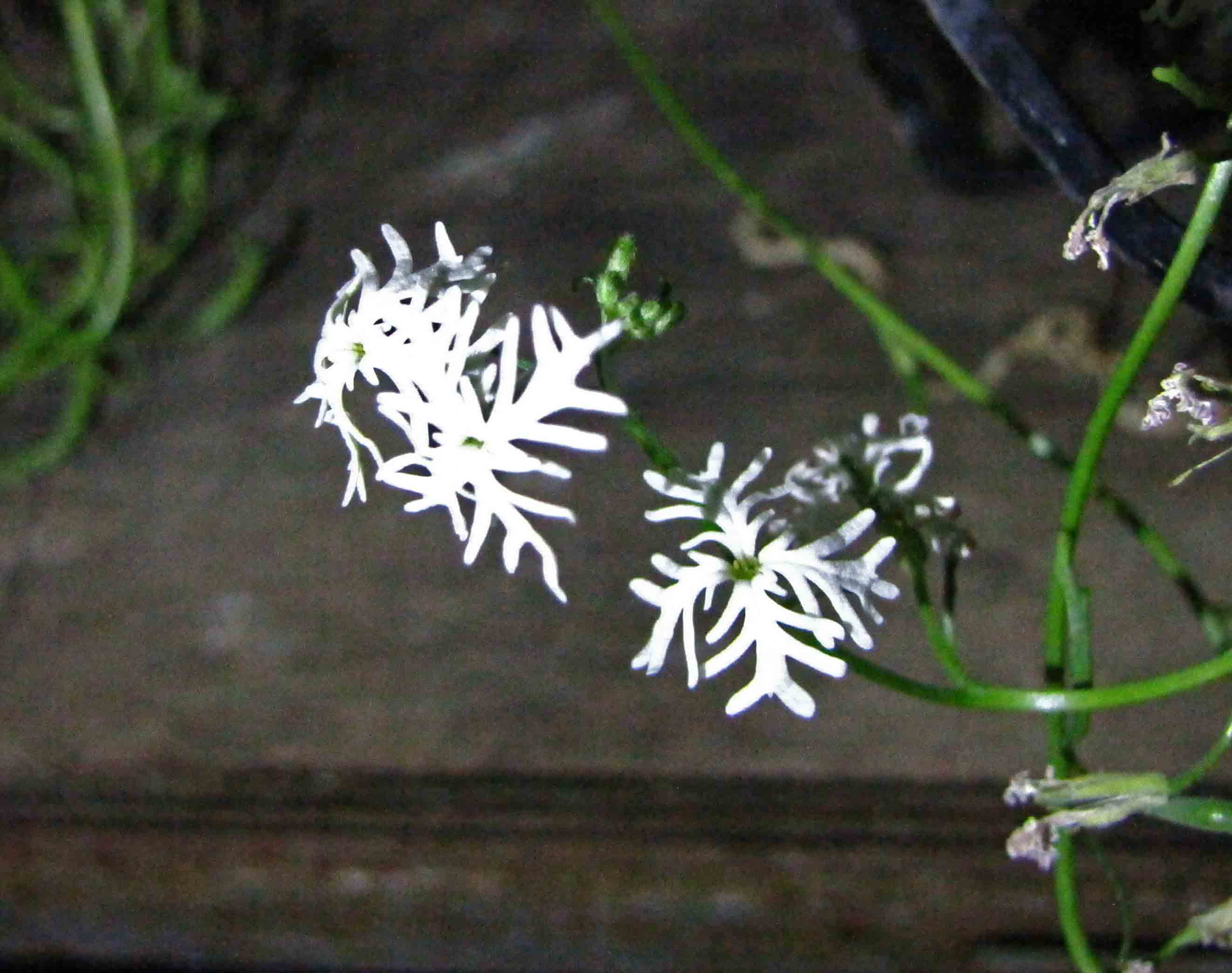
Schizopetalon

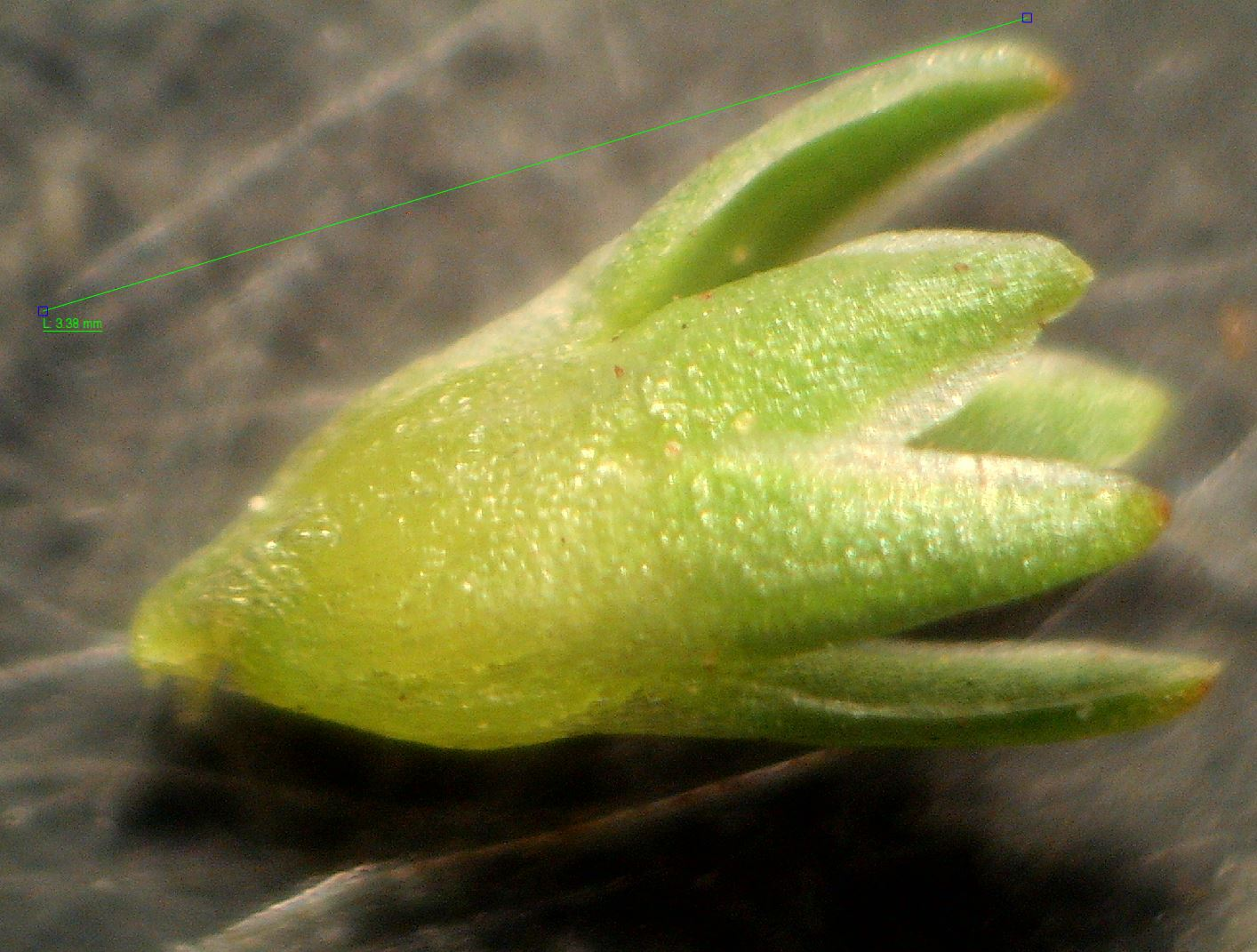
Scleranthus

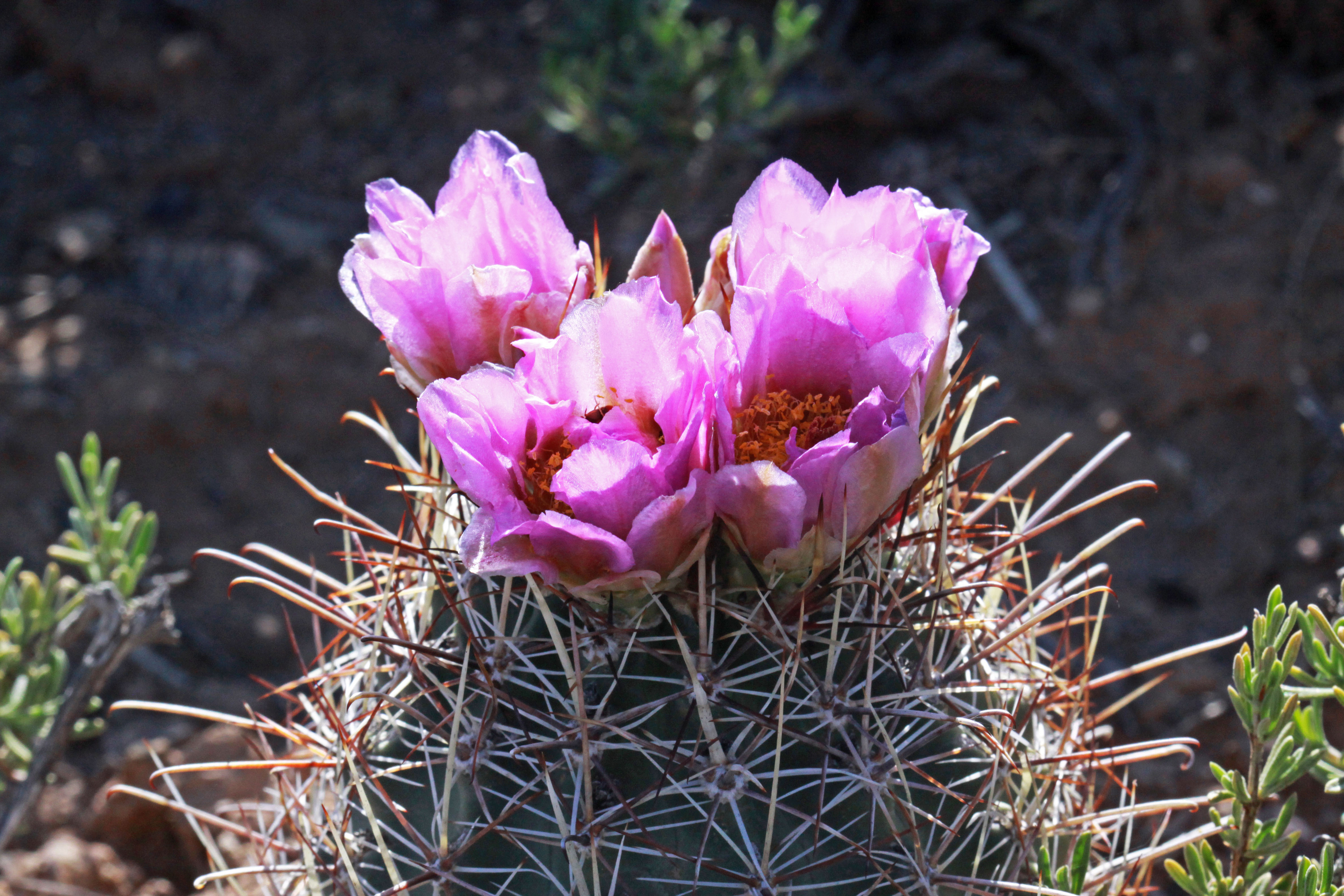
Sclerocactus

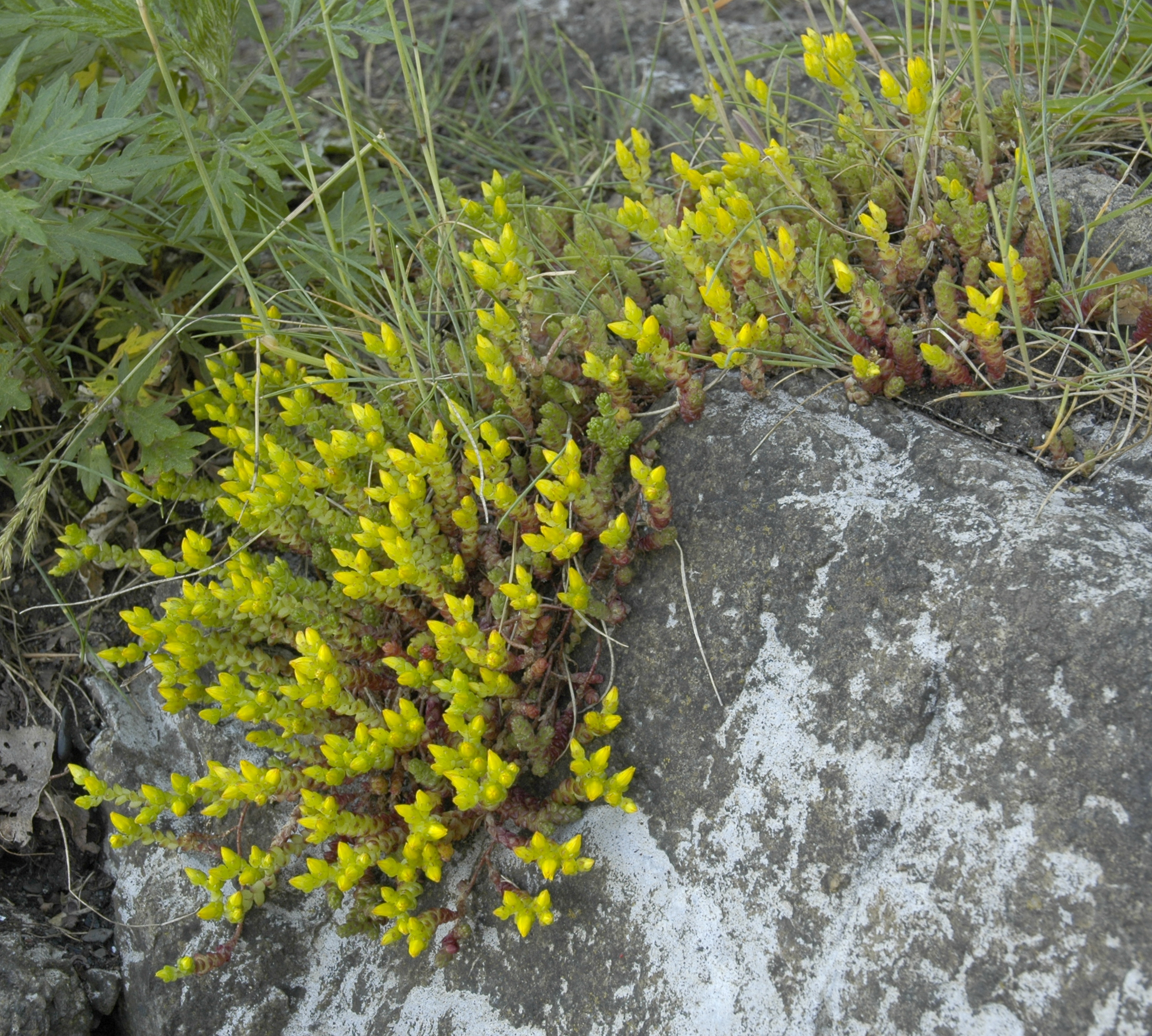
Sedum

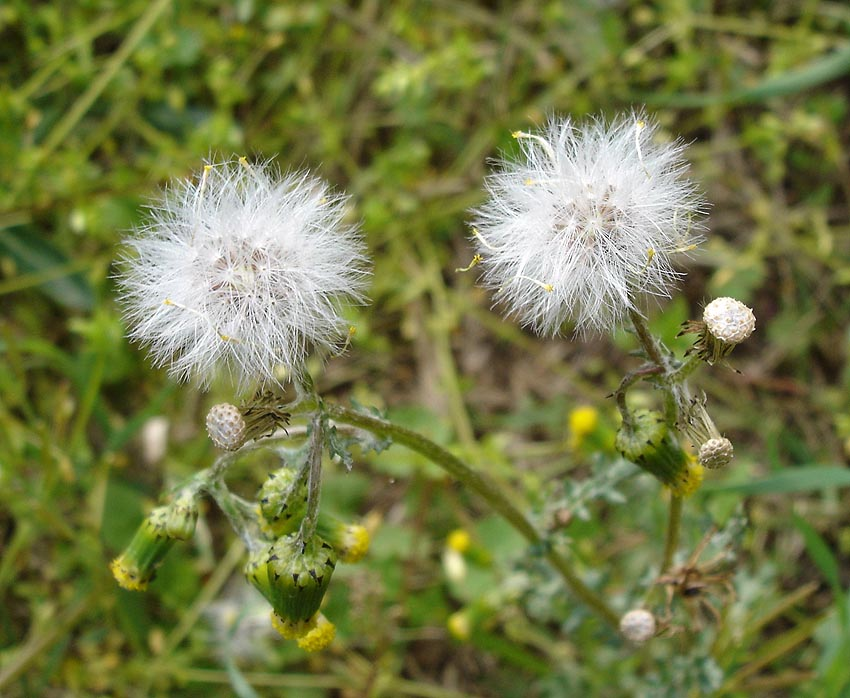
Senecio

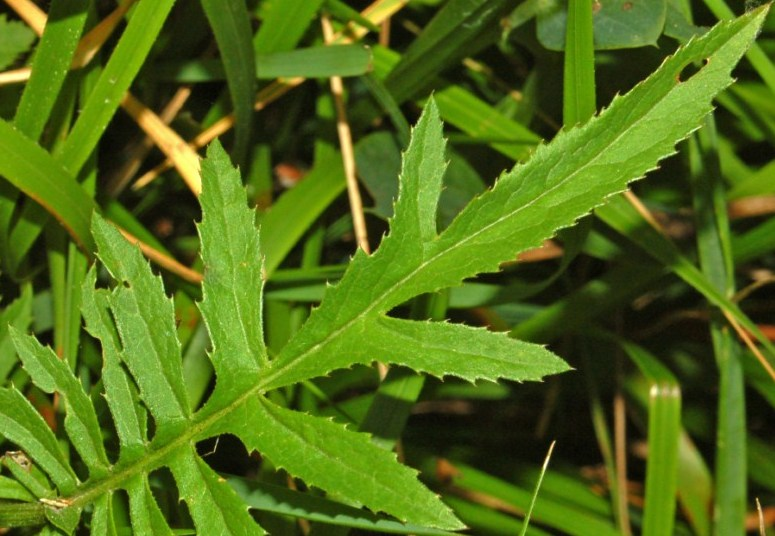
Serratula

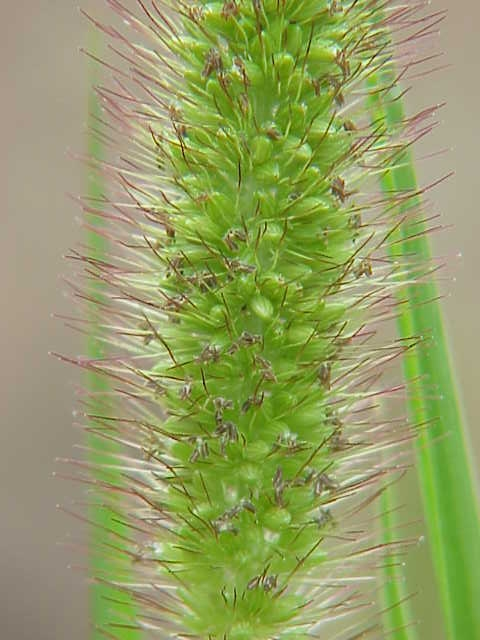
Setaria

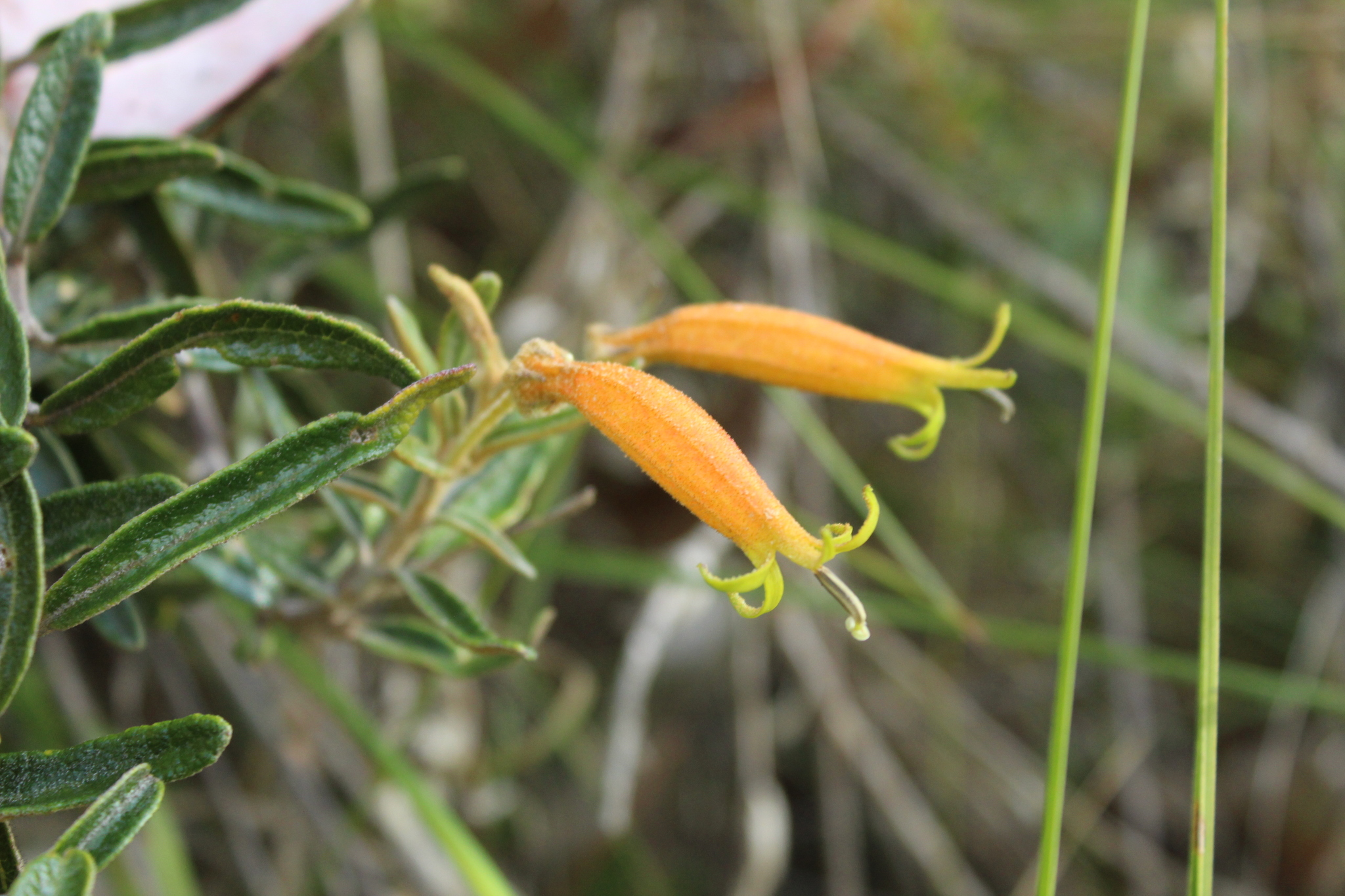
Siphocampylus

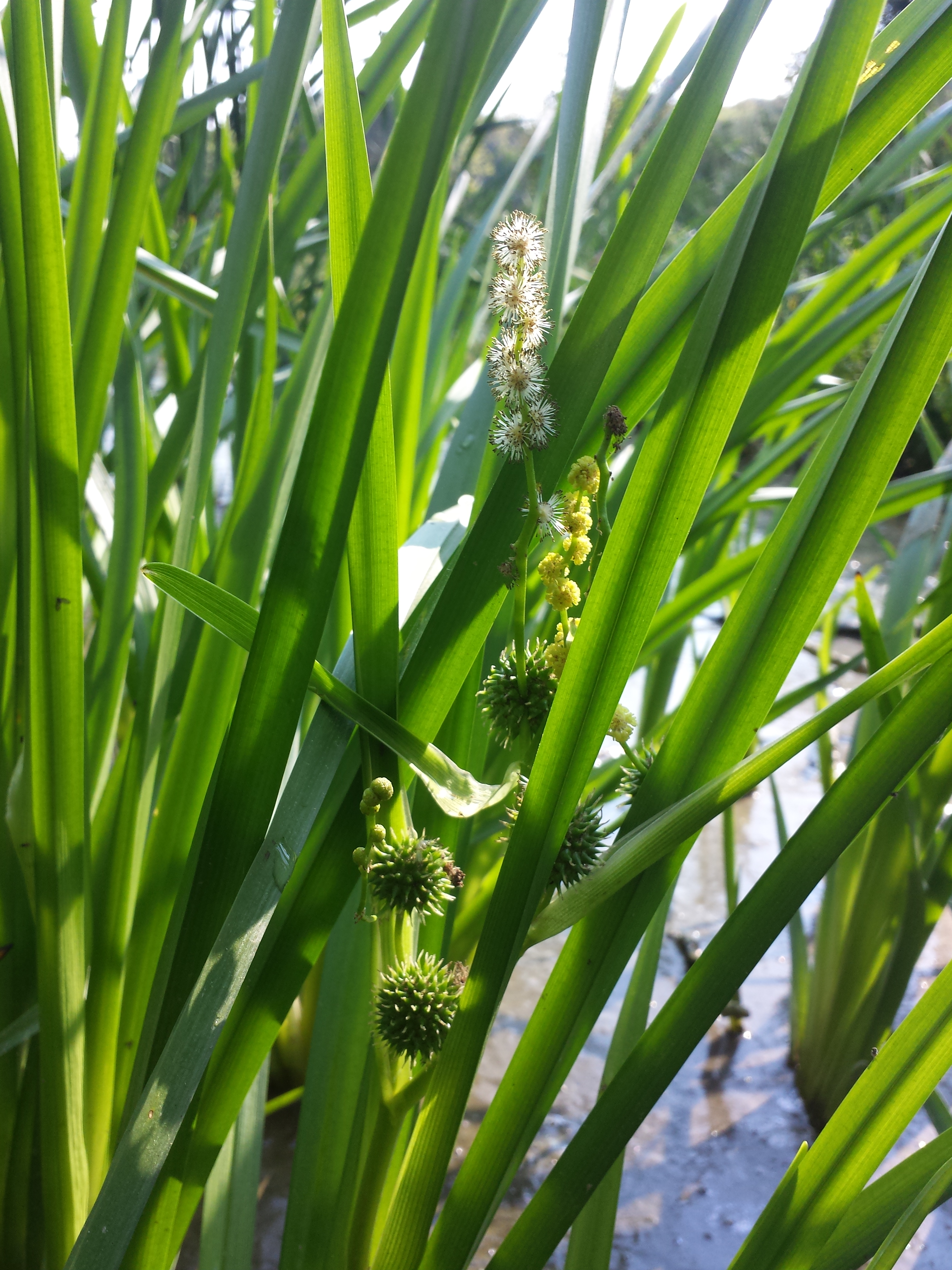
Sparganium

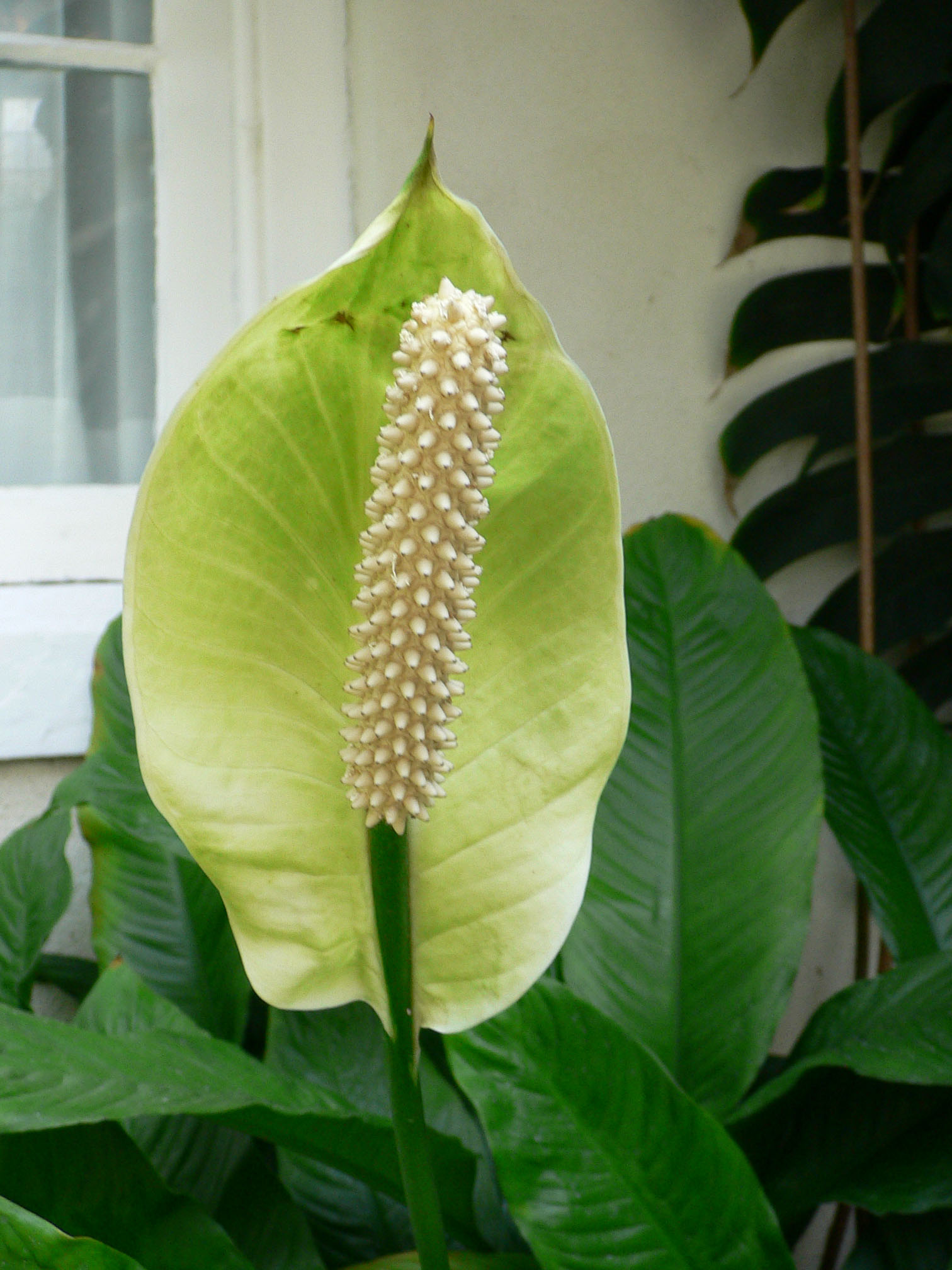
Spathiphyllum

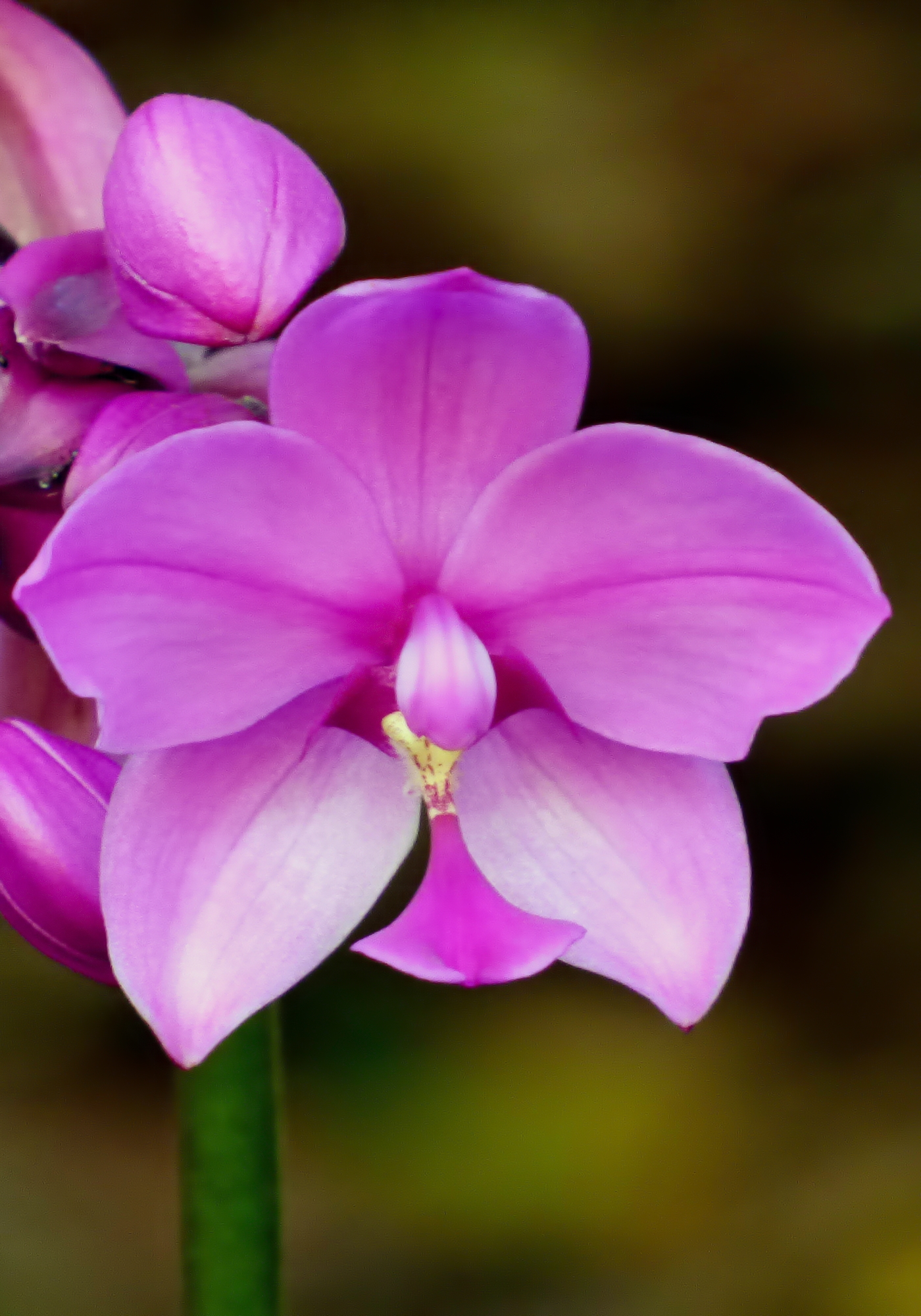
Spathoglottis

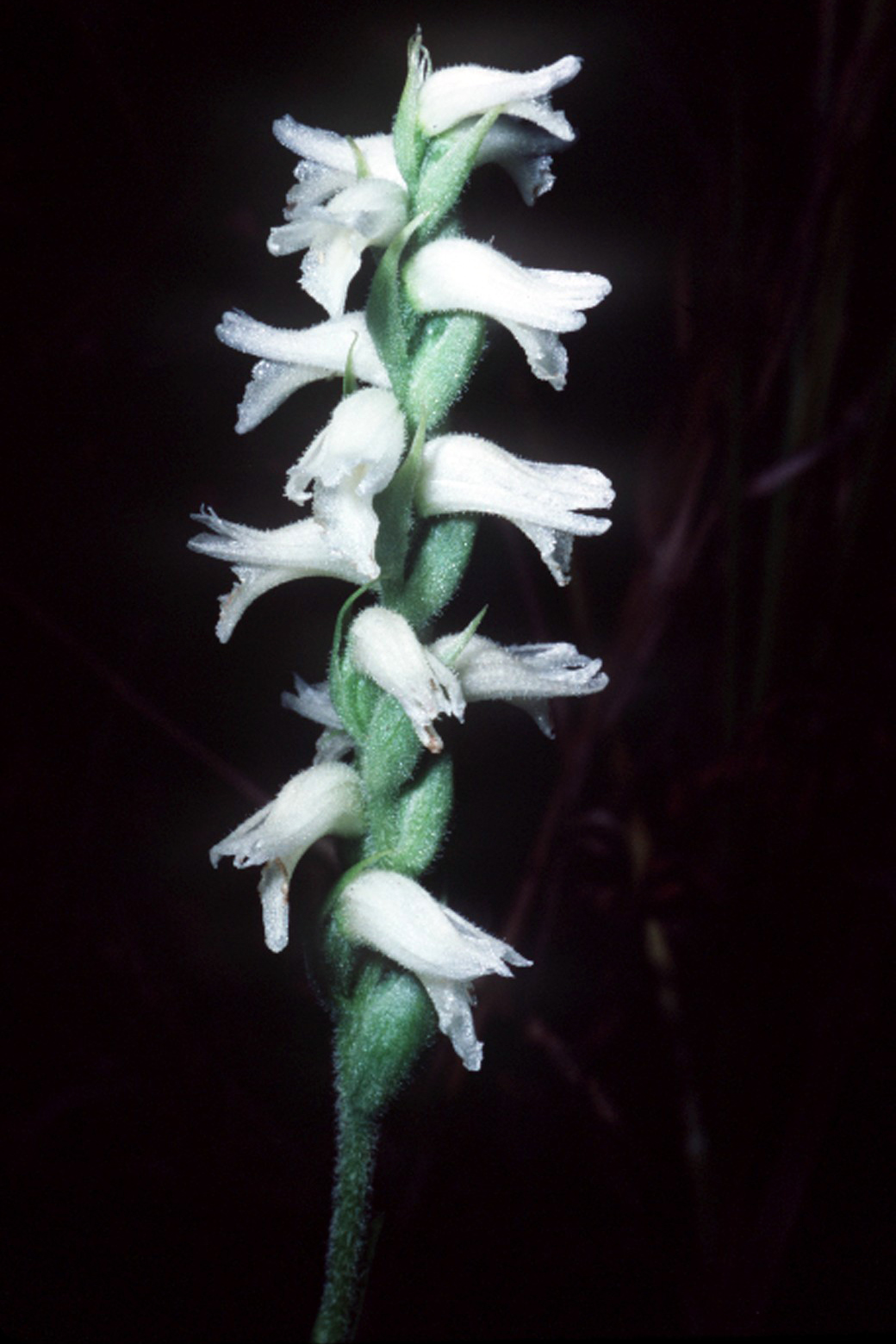
Spiranthes

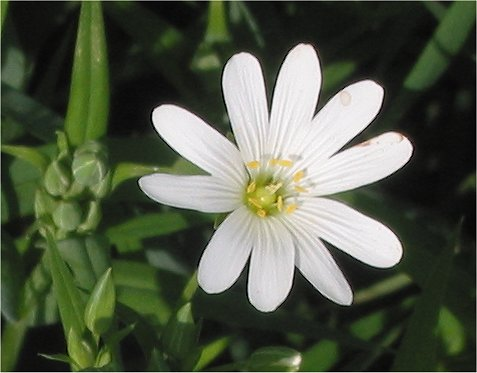
Stellaria

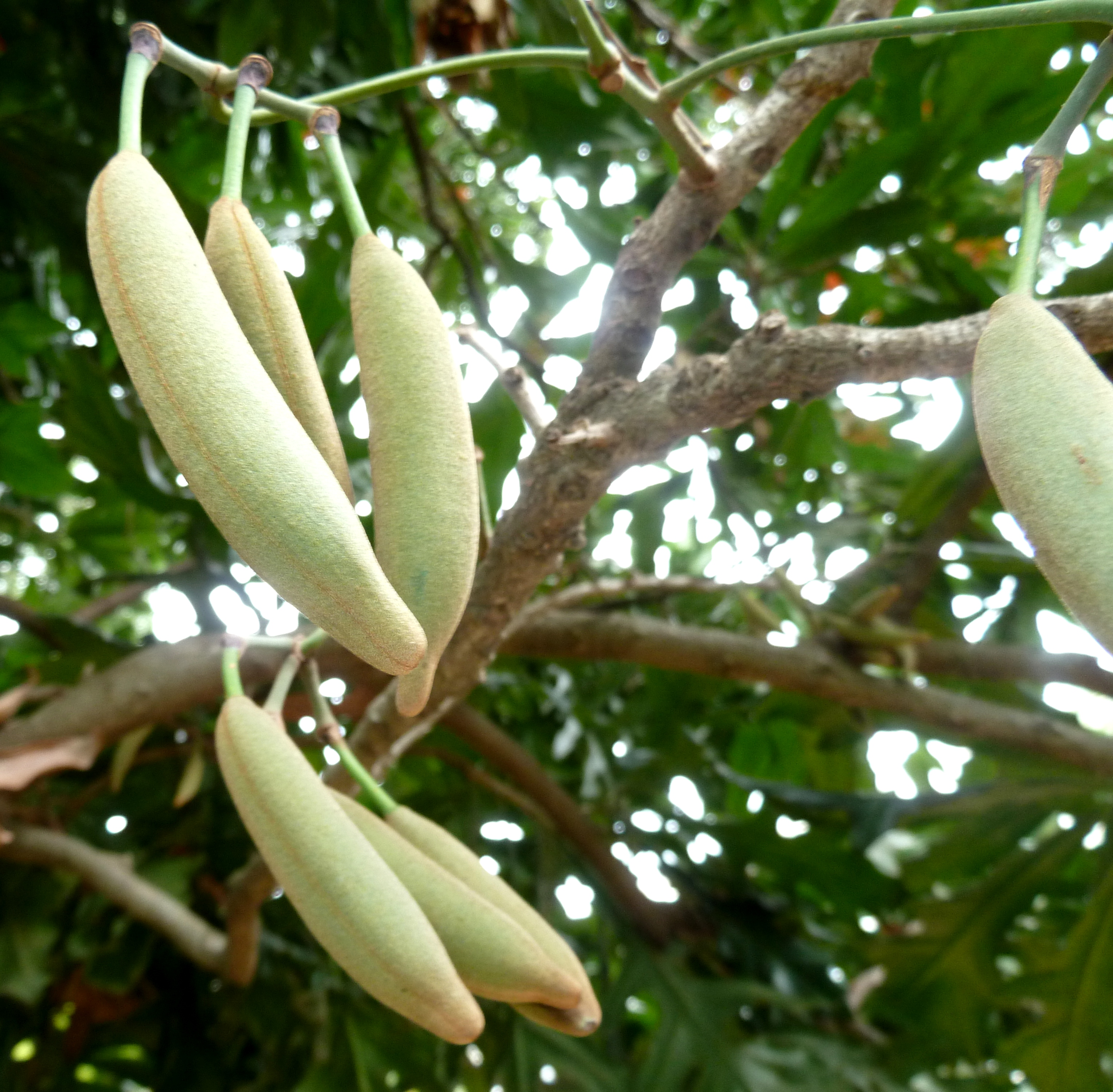
Stenocarpus

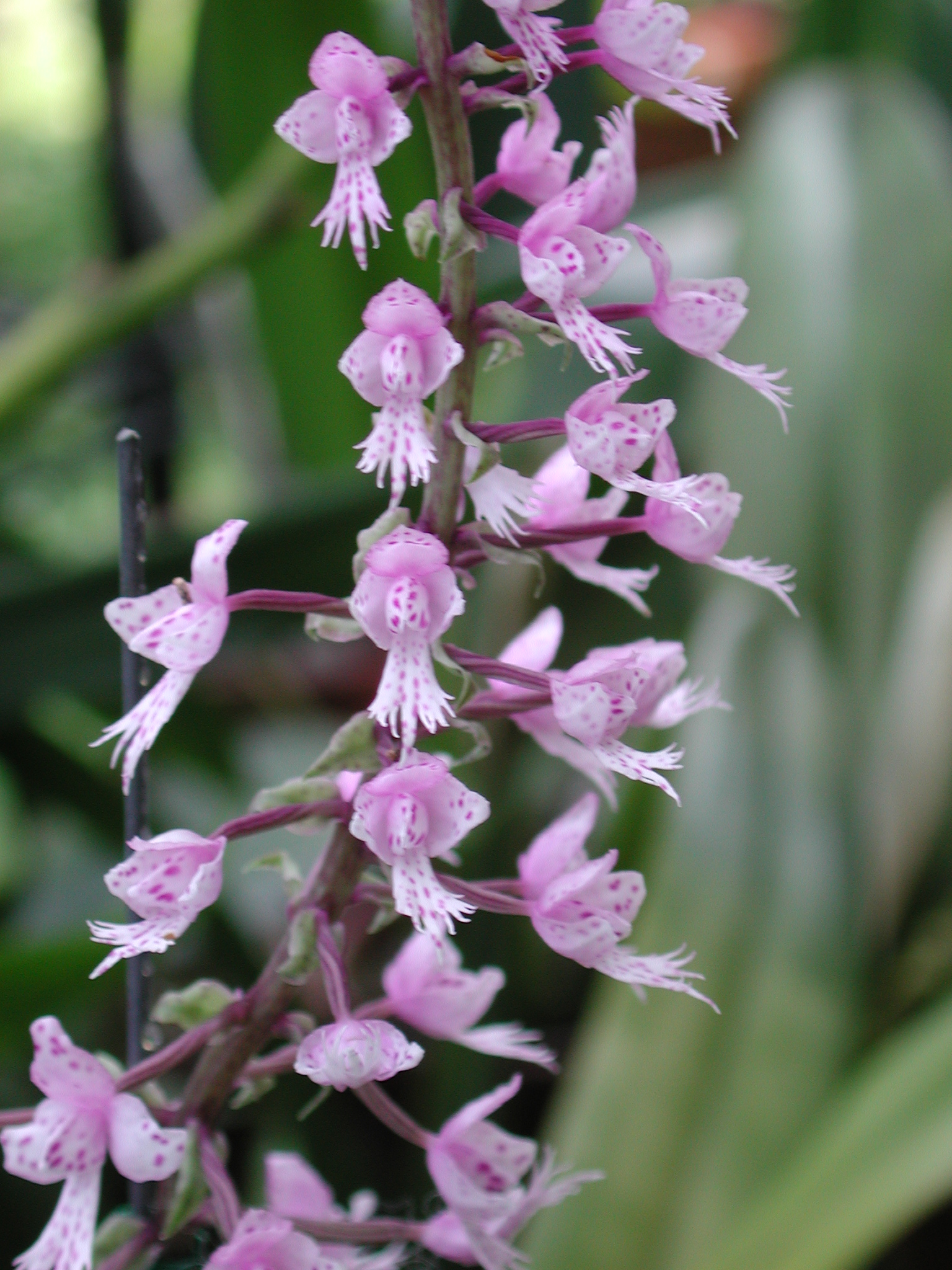
Stenoglottis

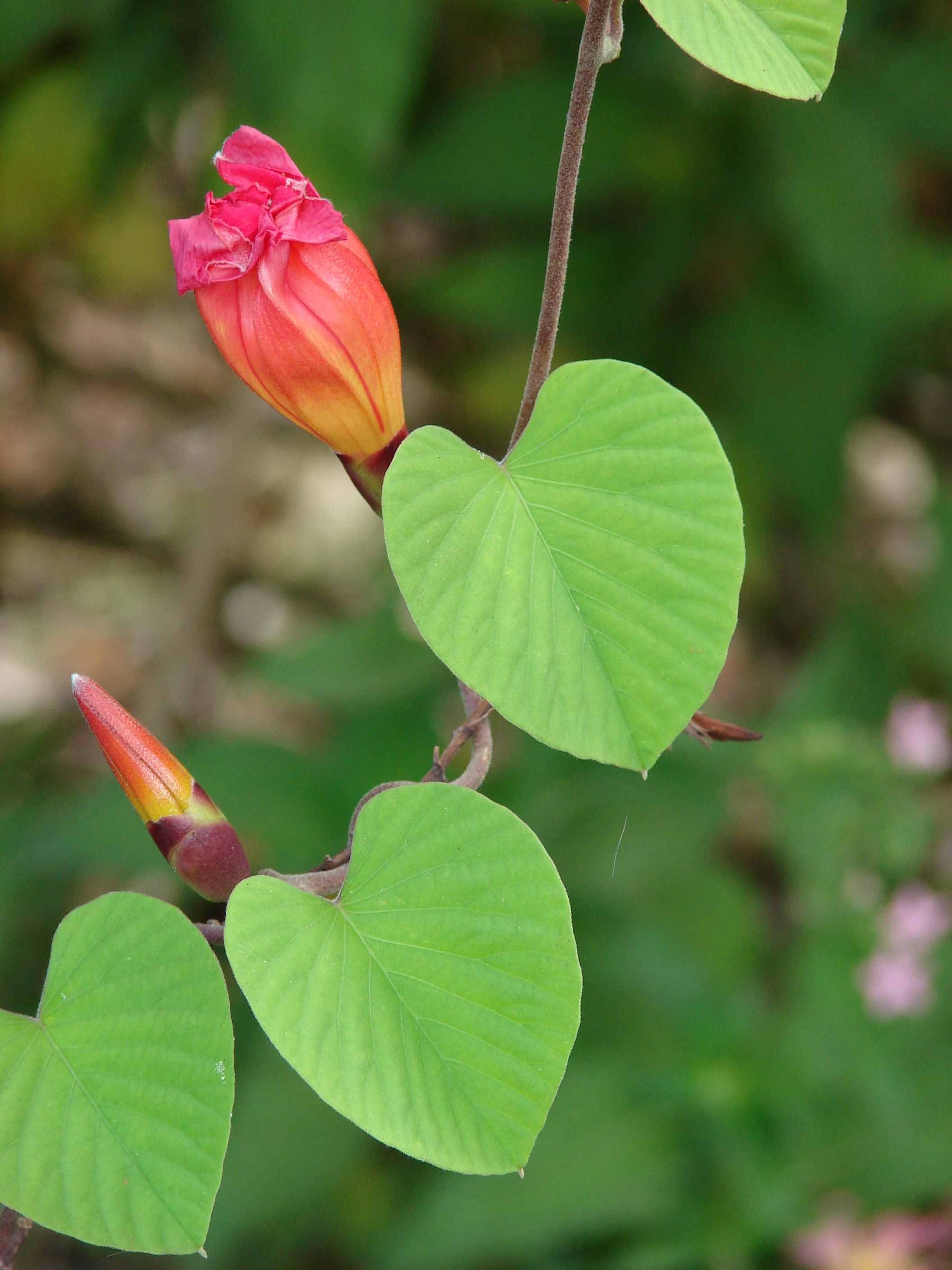
Stictocardia

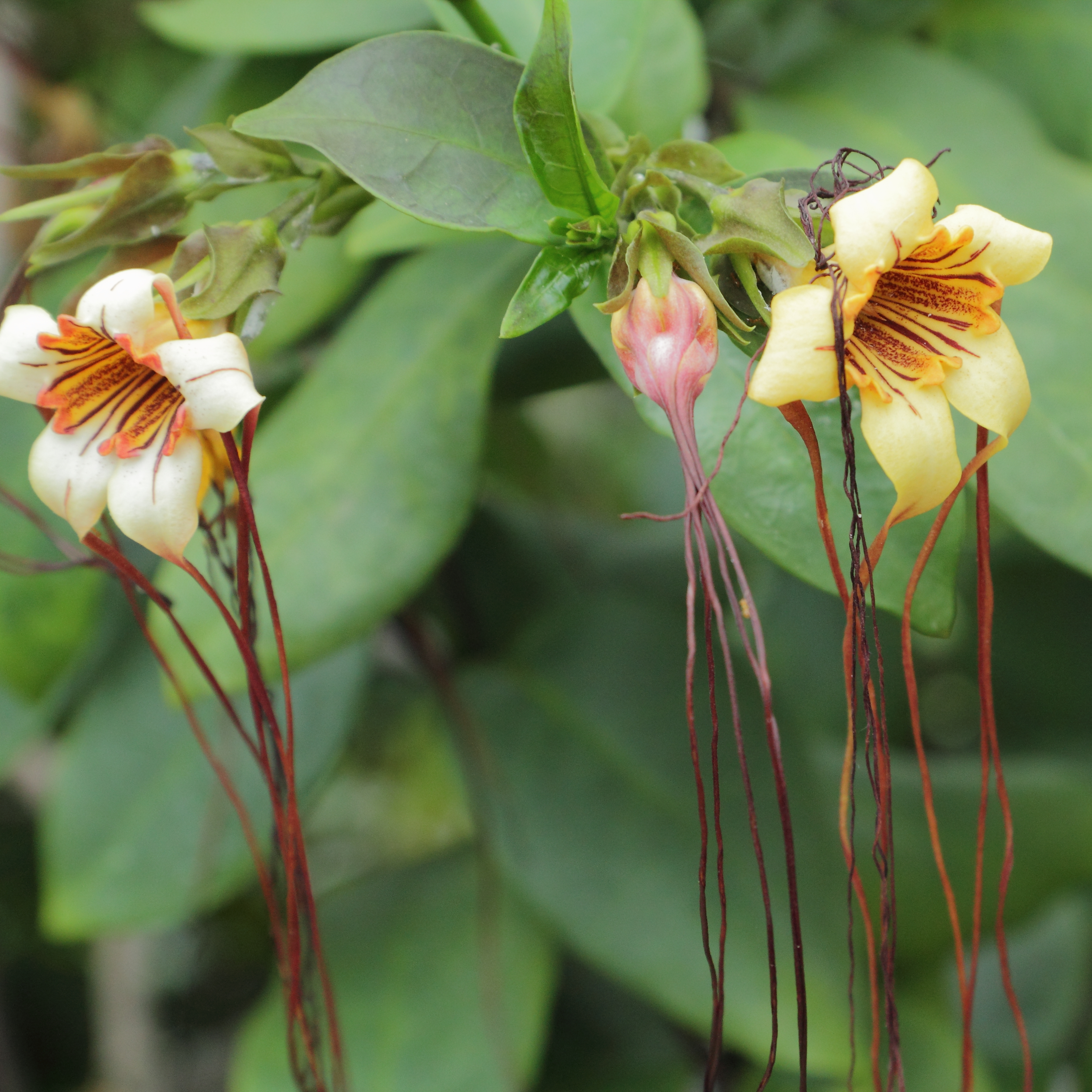
Strophanthus

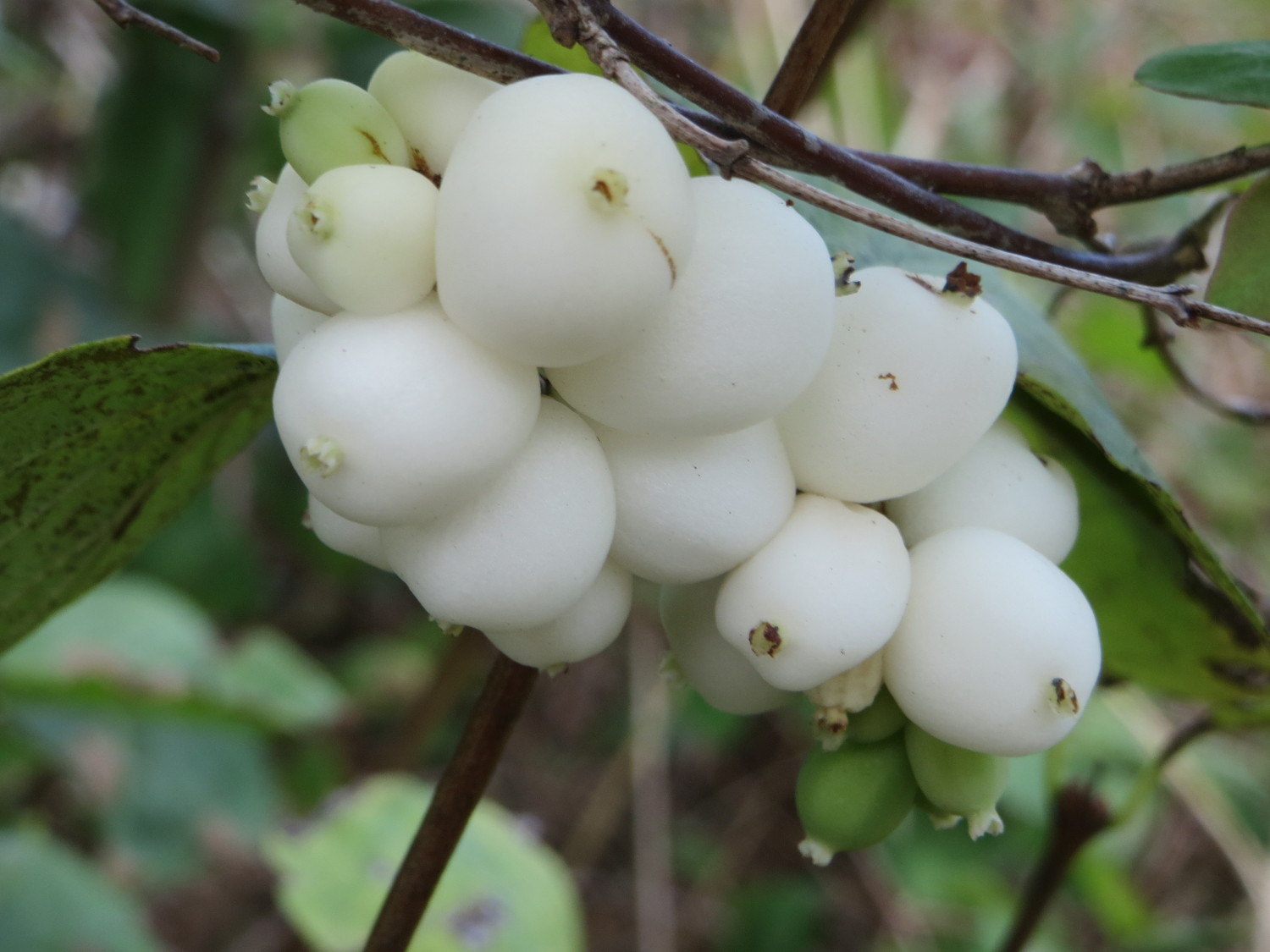
Symphoricarpos

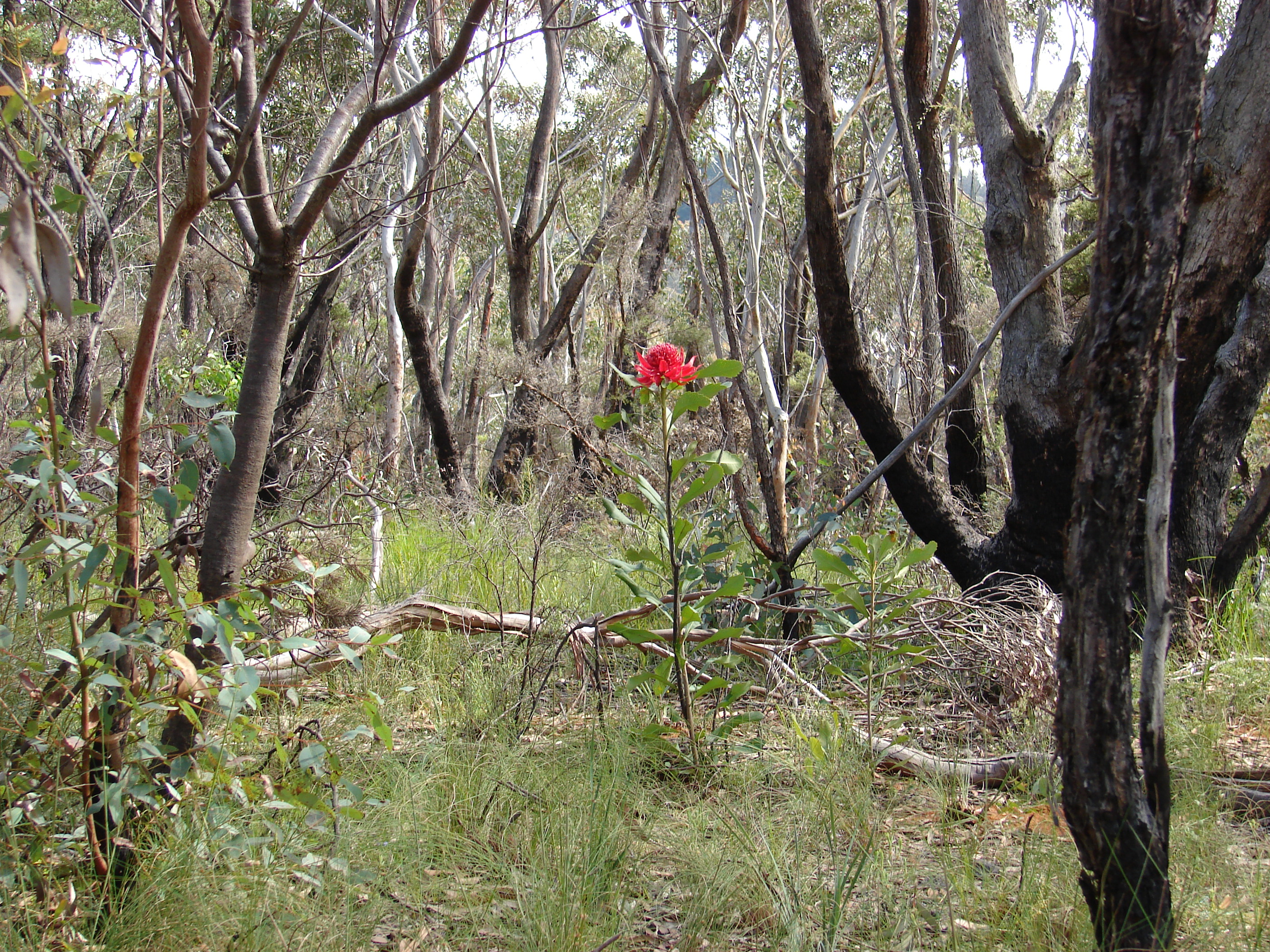
Telopea

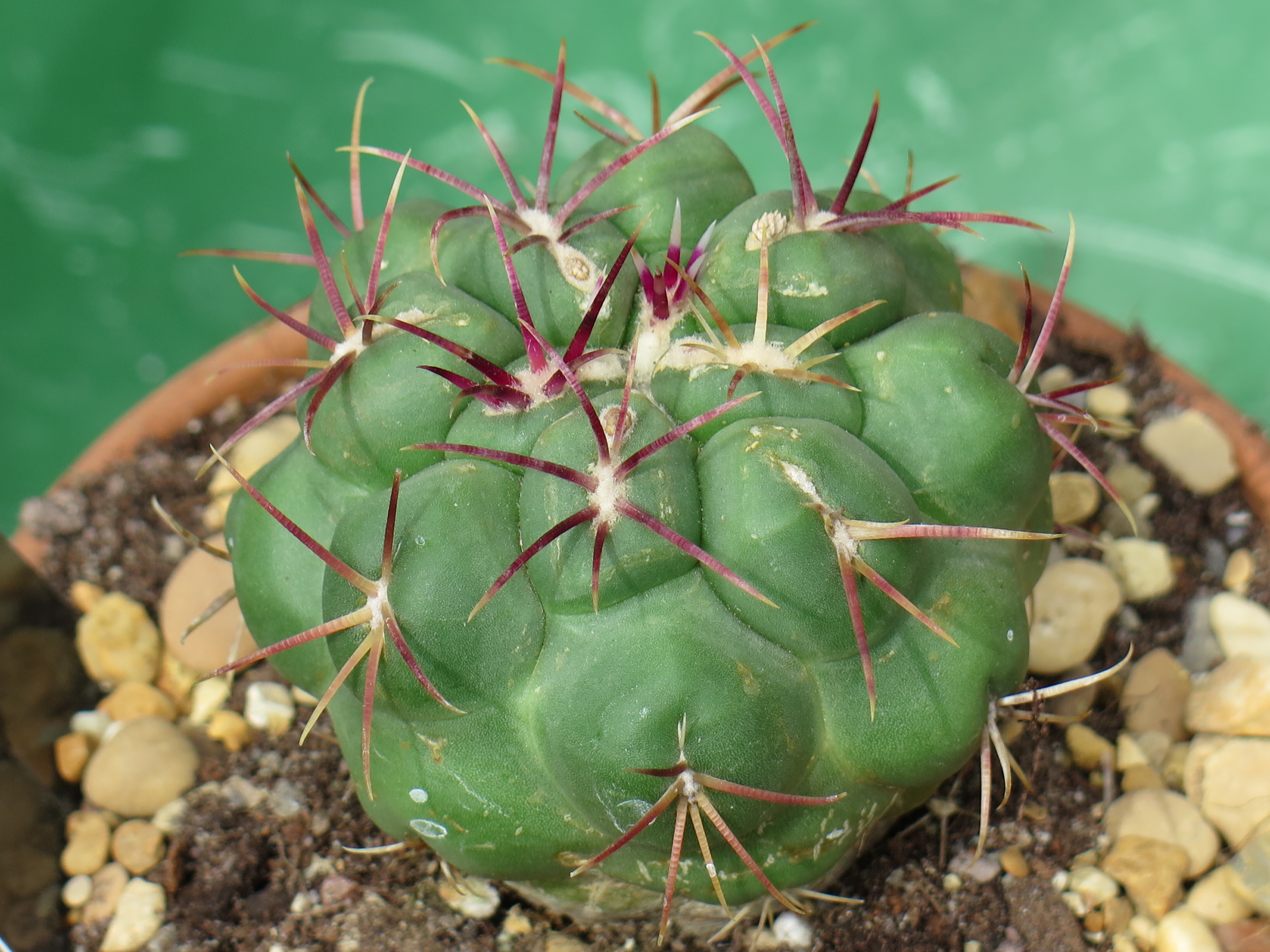
Thelocactus

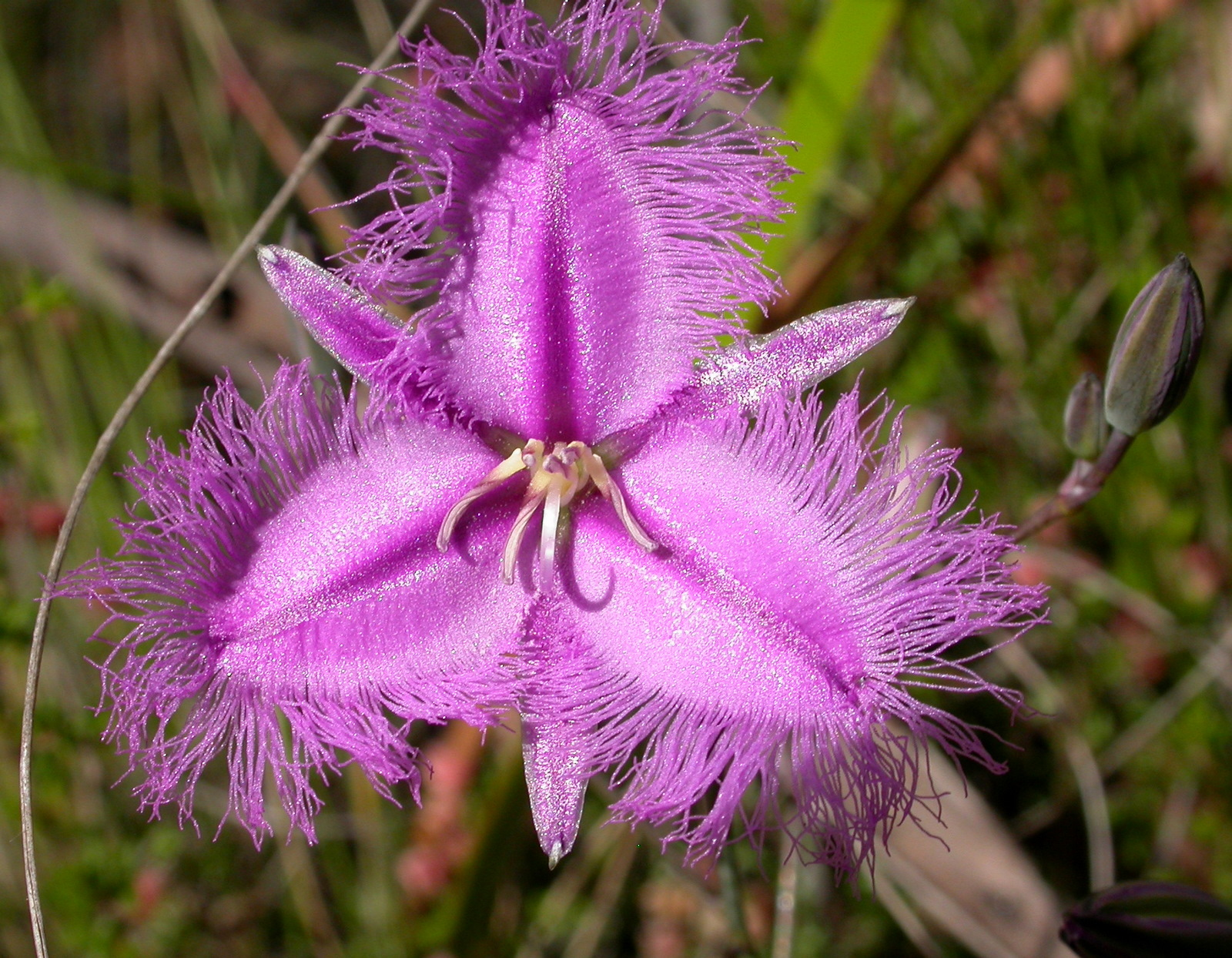
Thysanotus

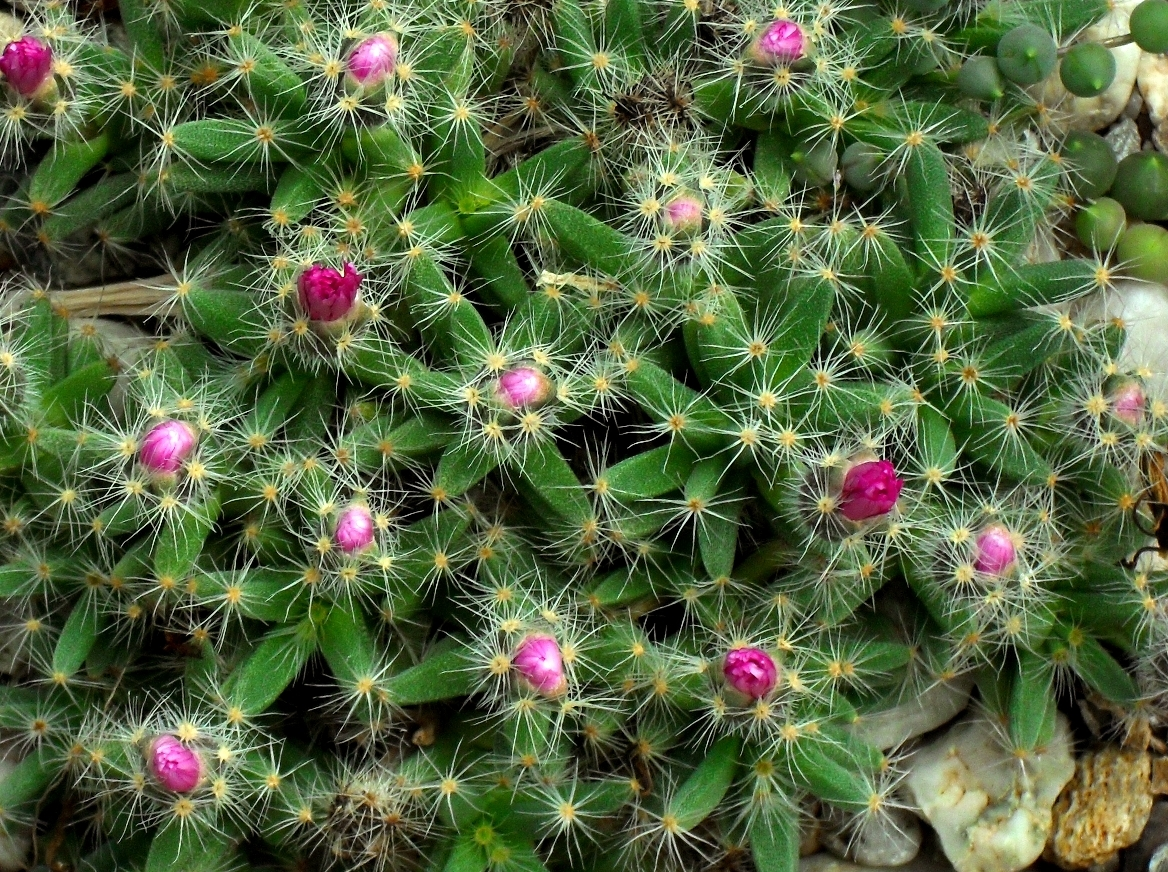
Trichodiadema

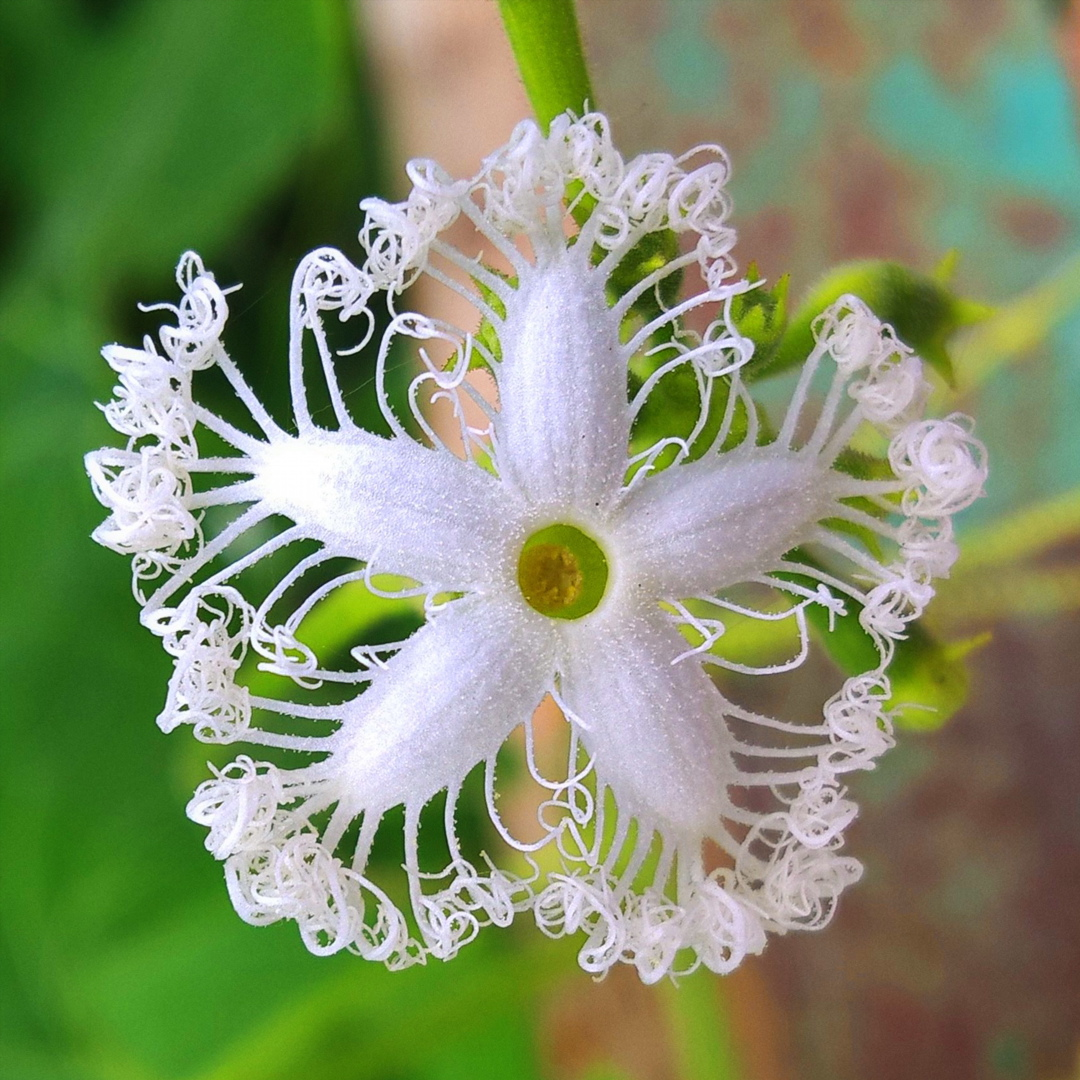
Trichosanthes

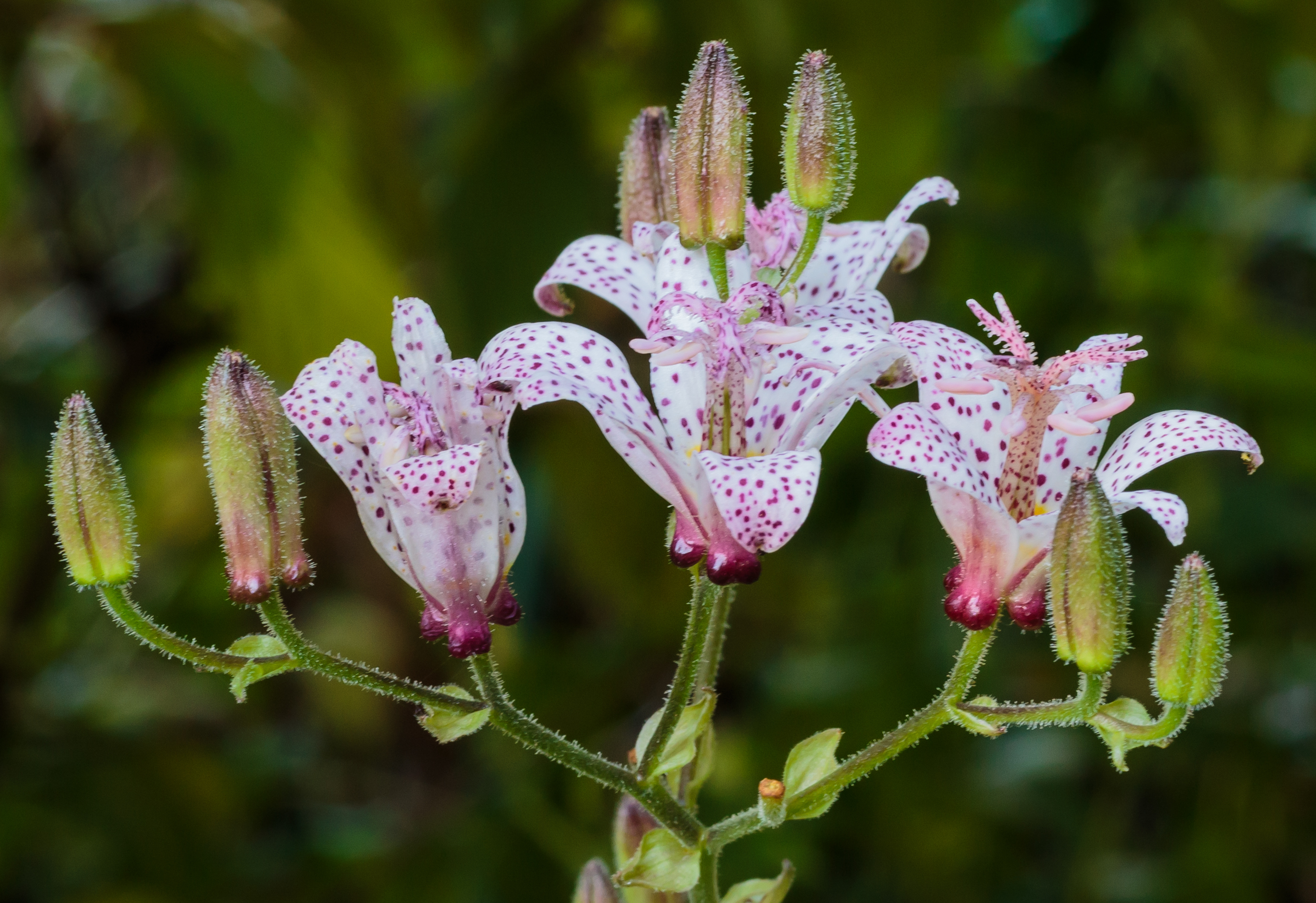
Tricyrtis

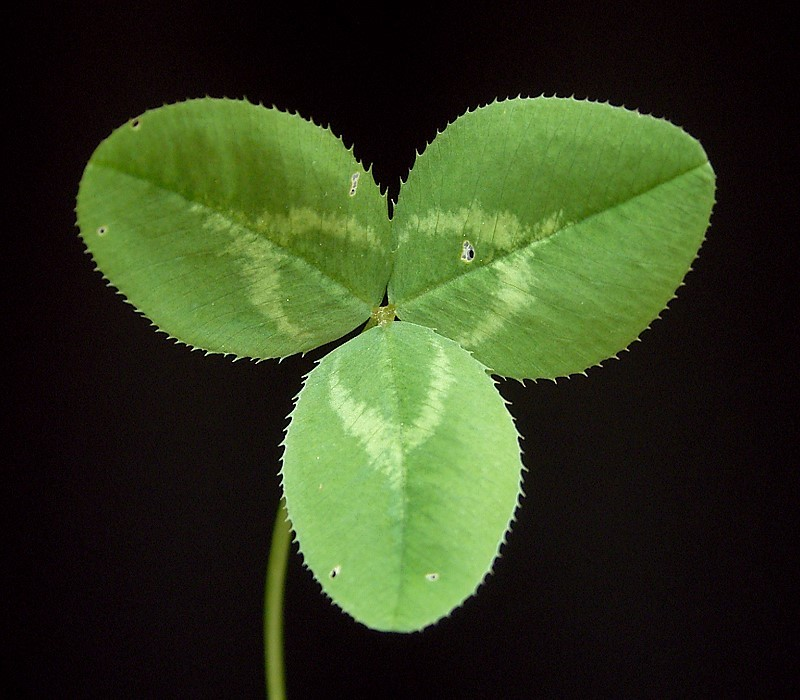
Trifolium

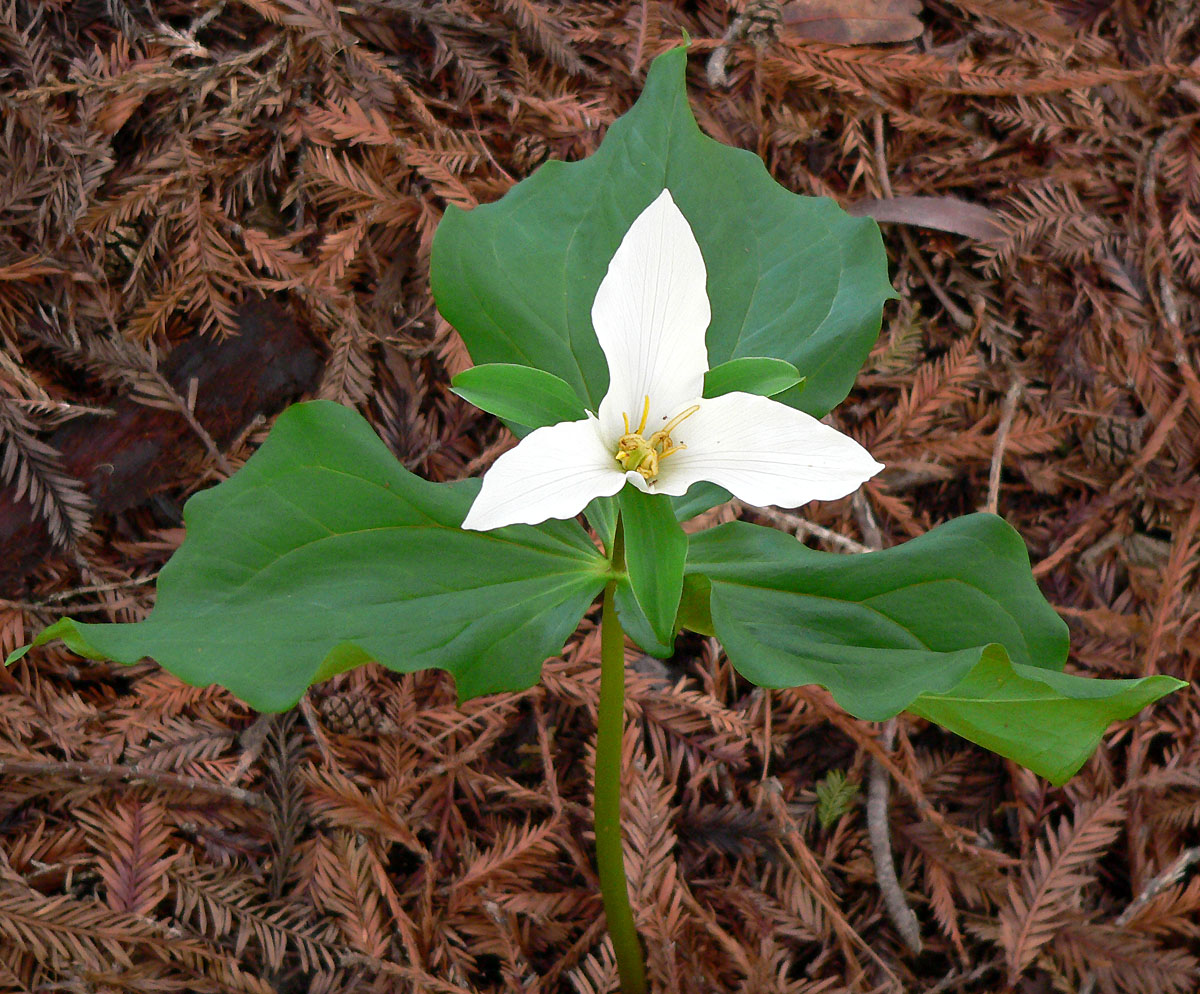
Trillium

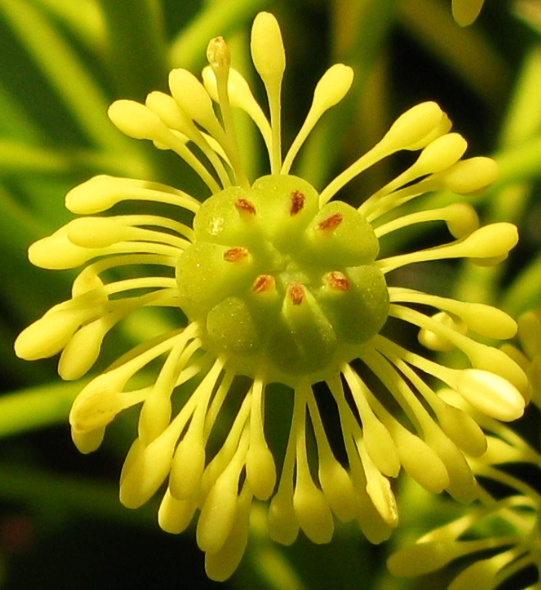
Trochodendron

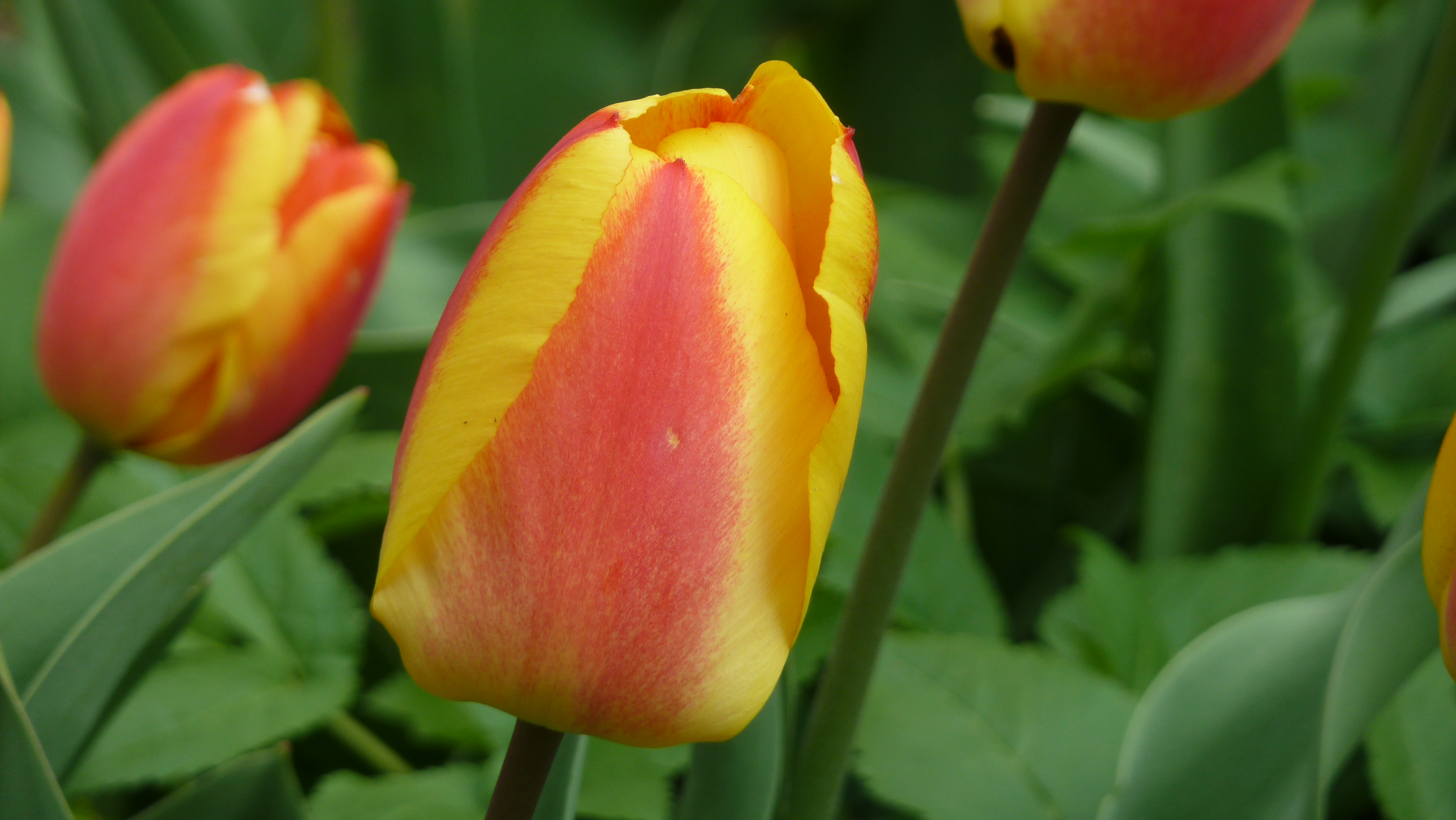
Tulipa

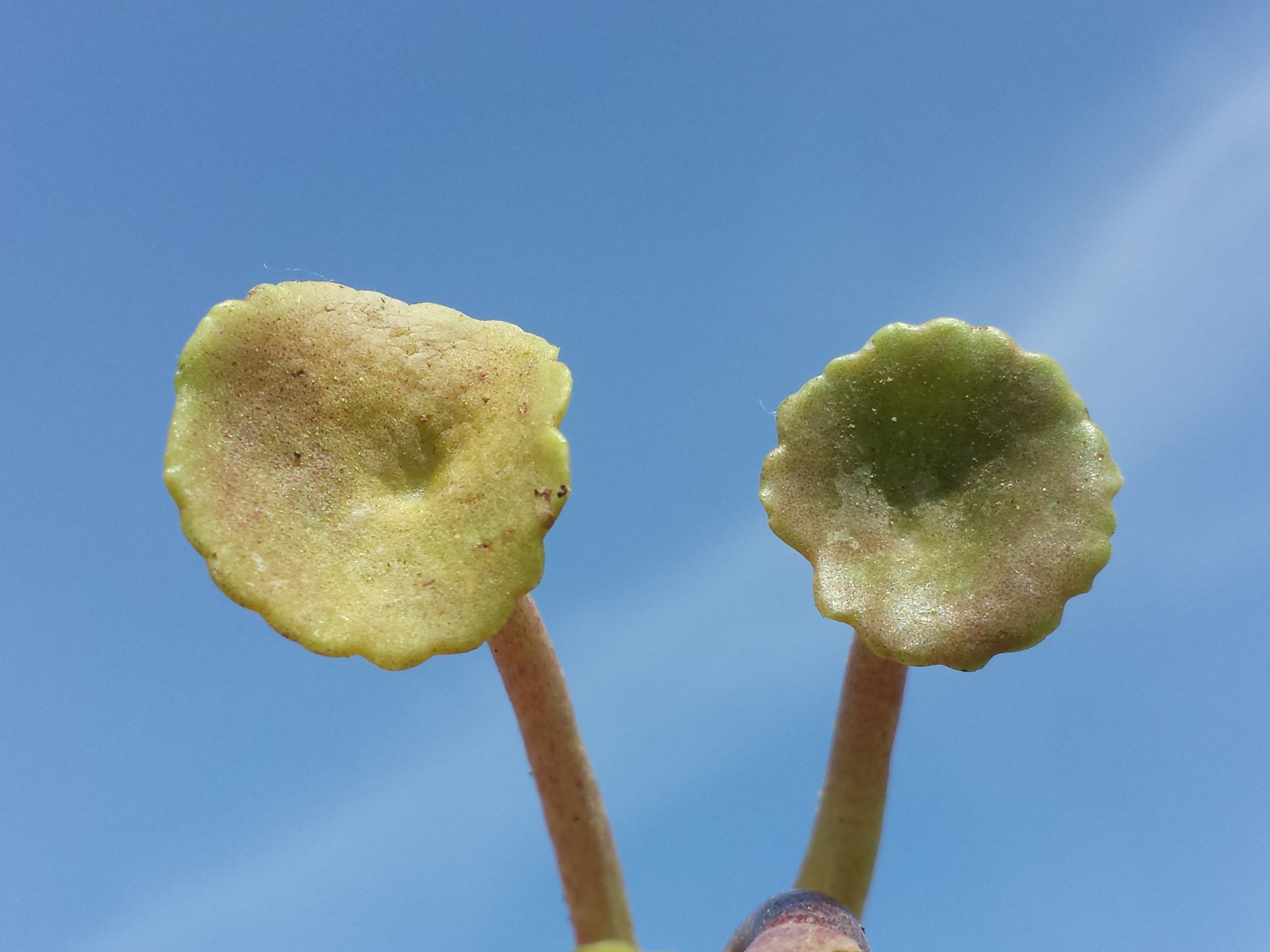
Umbilicus

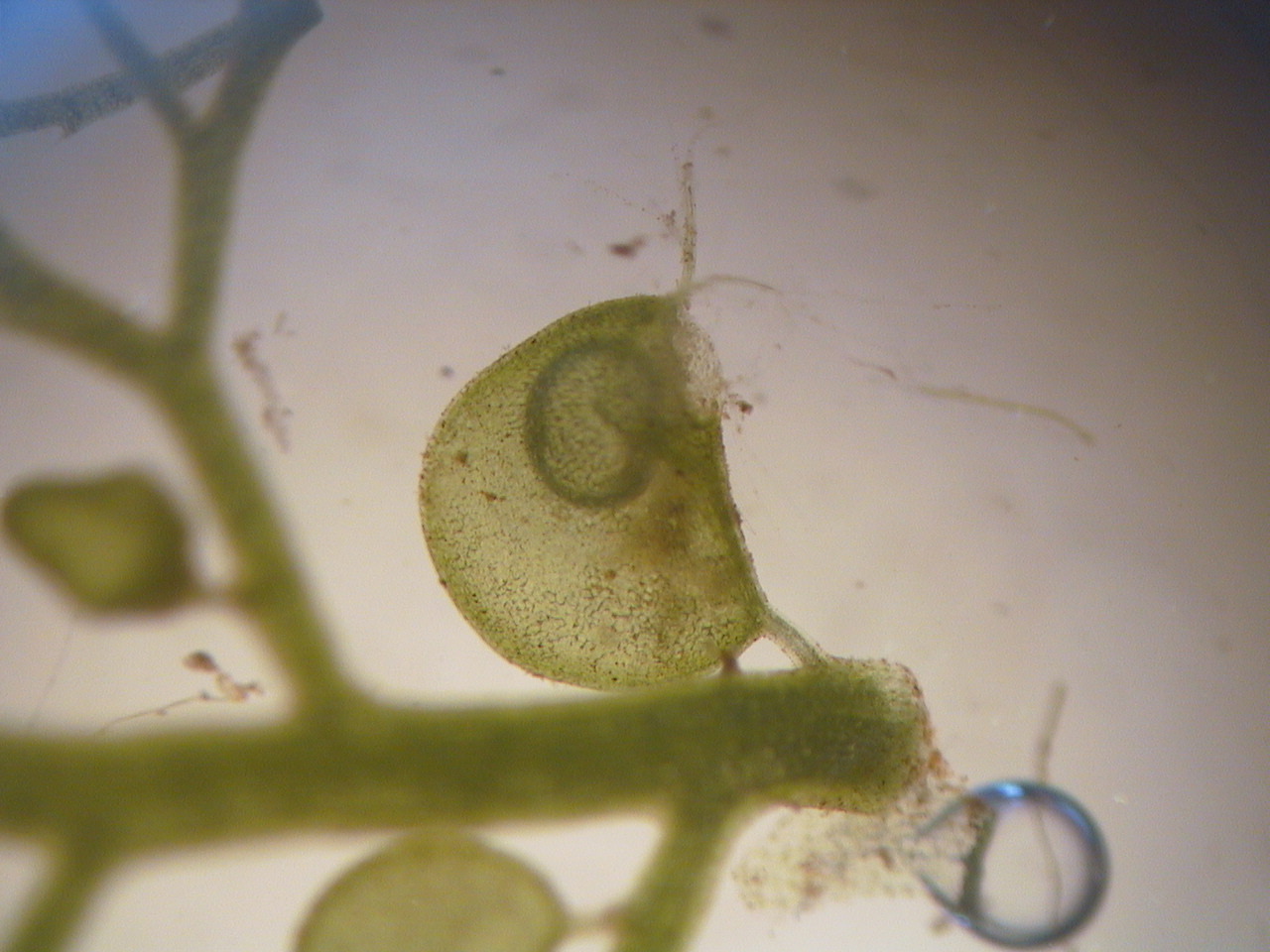
Utricularia

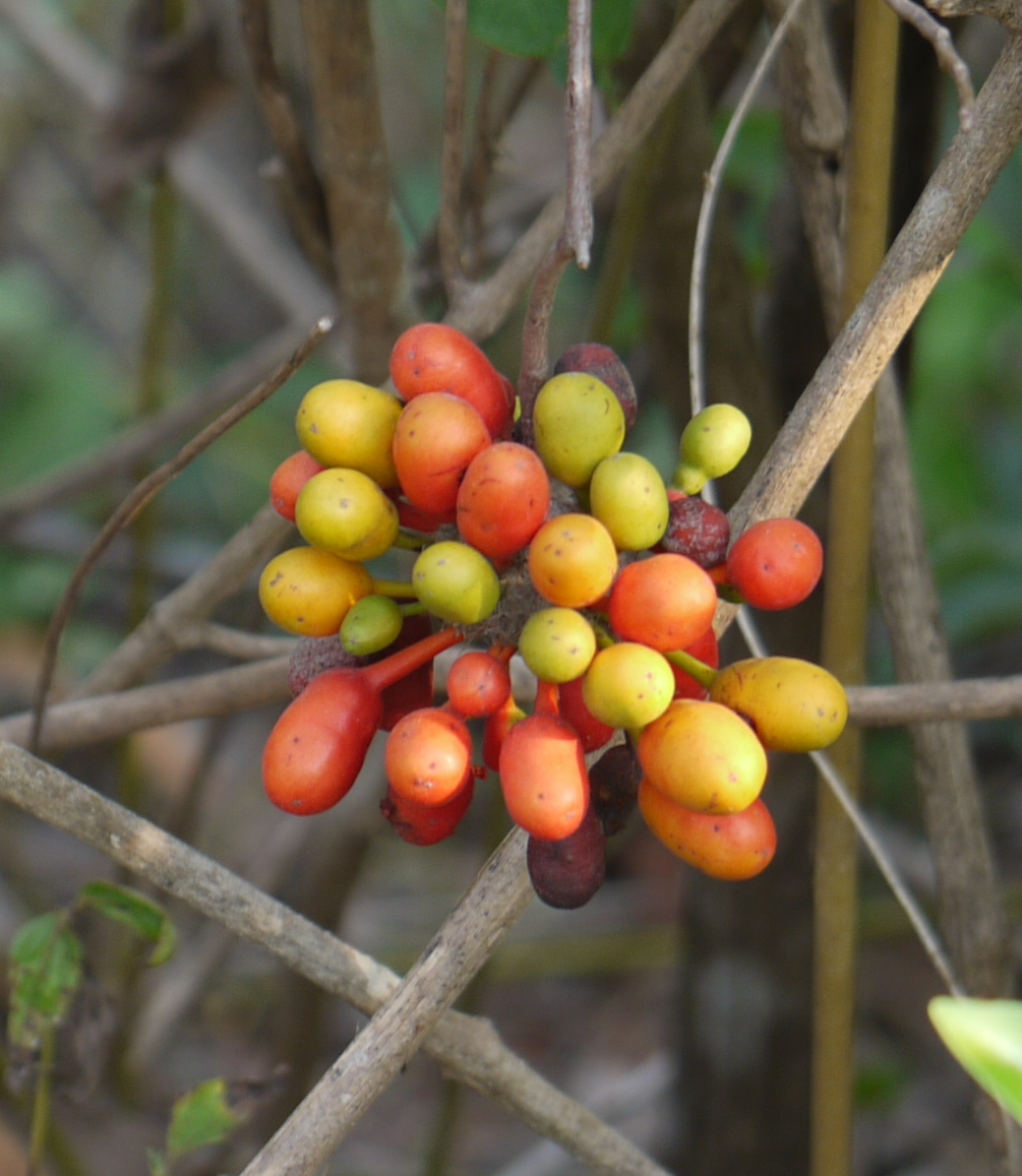
Uvaria

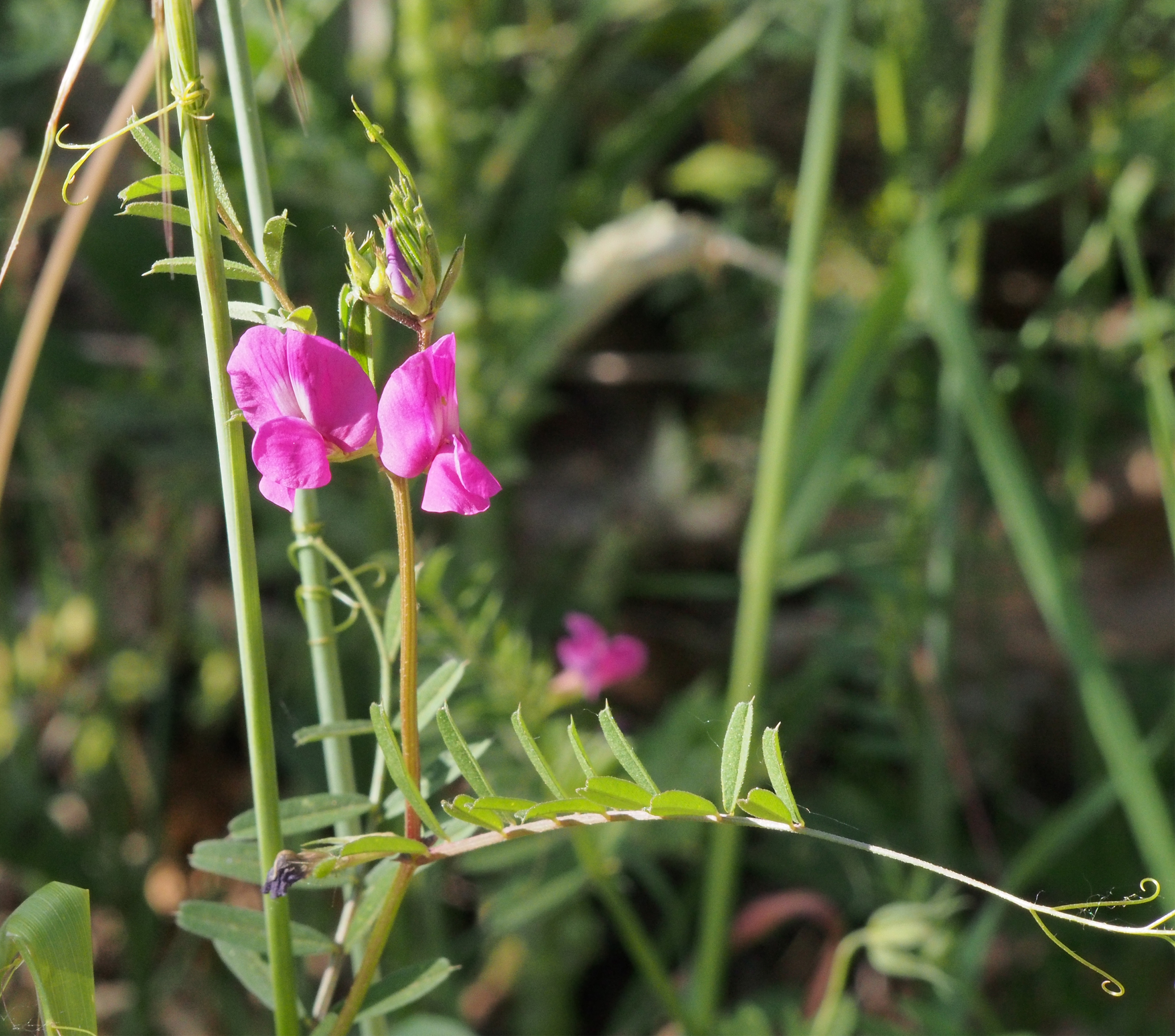
Vicia

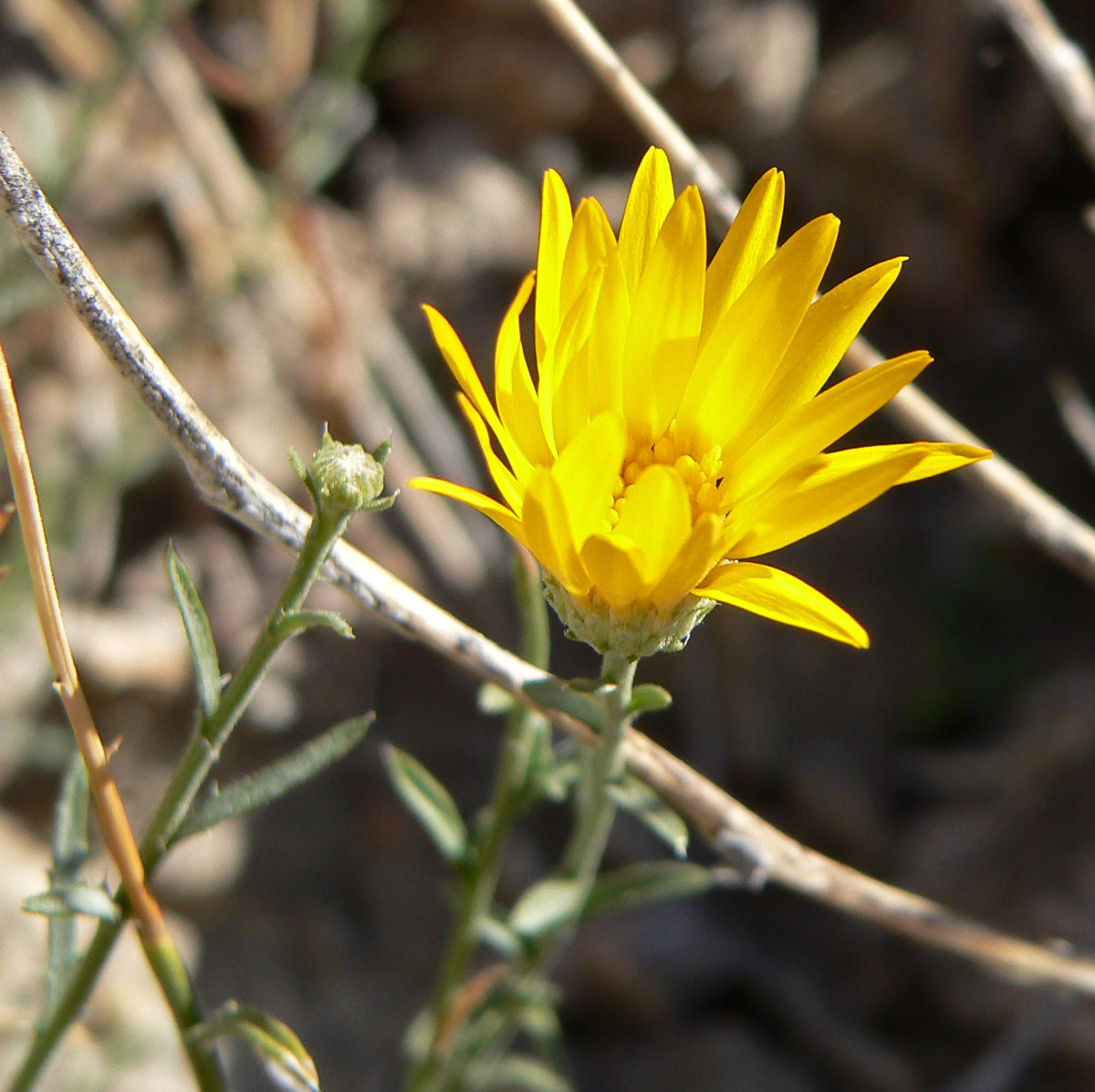
Xanthisma

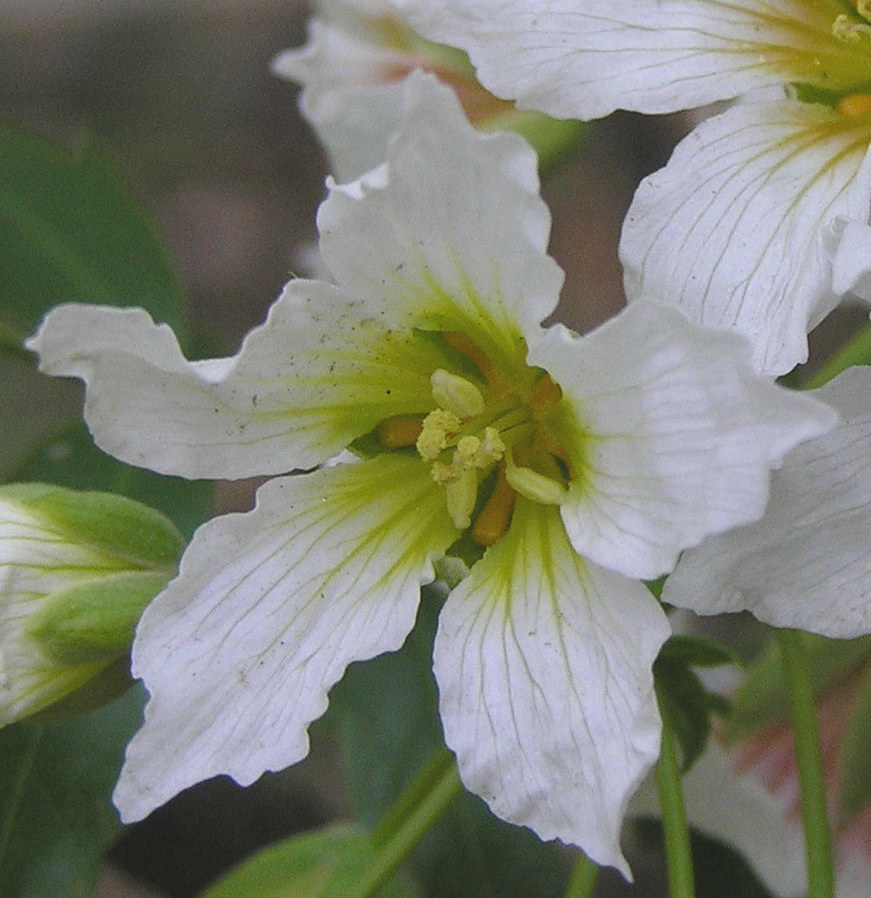
Xanthoceras

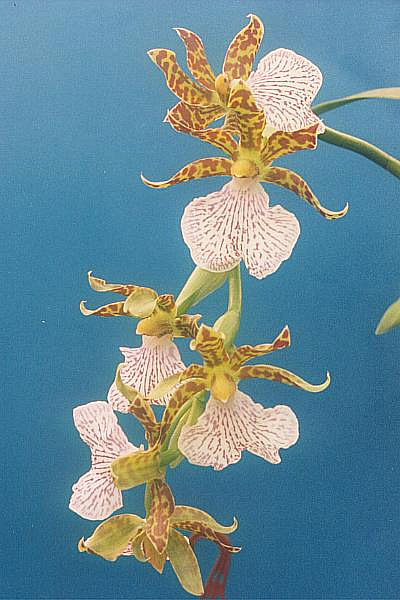
Zygopetalum

Genera
Genus (Note: Page numbers for references are omitted, since all the references list genera alphabetically except for Plants of the World, which is mainly cited for genera that match their family names.)	Meaning or derivation	Family	Order	Ref	G
Quercus	Latin name (Note: "(Language) name" means the name of some plant originally, not necessarily in this genus.)	Fagaceae	Fagales	CS	G
Quillaja	Chilean name	Quillajaceae	Fabales	St	G
Ranunculus	Latin: little frog (some species are aquatic)	Ranunculaceae	Ranunculales	CS	G
Raphanus	Greek and Latin name	Brassicaceae	Brassicales	CS	G
Raphia	needle (the fruit)	Arecaceae	Arecales	St	G
Ravenala	Malagasy name	Strelitziaceae	Zingiberales	St	G
Renanthera	kidney anther (the kidney-shaped pollen-masses)	Orchidaceae	Asparagales	St	
Reseda	Latin name	Resedaceae	Brassicales	St	G
Restio	Latin: rope-maker	Restionaceae	Poales	Ba	G
Retama	Arabic name	Fabaceae	Fabales	St	G
Rhabdothamnus	rod (twiggy) bush	Gesneriaceae	Lamiales	St	G
Rhamnus	Greek and Latin name	Rhamnaceae	Rosales	CS	G
Rhaphidophora	needle-bearing (the fruit)	Araceae	Alismatales	St	G
Rhaphiolepis	needle scale (the bracteoles). Previously Raphiolepis.	Rosaceae	Rosales	CS	G
Rhaphithamnus	needle bush (the spines)	Verbenaceae	Lamiales	St	G
Rhapidophyllum	needle leaf (the spines at the base)	Arecaceae	Arecales	St	
Rhapis	needle (the leaf segments)	Arecaceae	Arecales	CS	G
Rheum	Greek name	Polygonaceae	Caryophyllales	CS	G
Rhexia	Latin name	Melastomataceae	Myrtales	St	G
Rhinanthus	nose flowers	Orobanchaceae	Lamiales	Ba	G
Rhipsalis	wicker	Cactaceae	Caryophyllales	St	G
Rhodanthe	rose-red flowers	Asteraceae	Asterales	Ba	G
Rhodanthemum	rose-red flowers	Asteraceae	Asterales	Ba	G
Rhodiola	little rose	Crassulaceae	Saxifragales	CS	G
Rhodochiton	rose-red cloak (the red calyx)	Plantaginaceae	Lamiales	CS	G
Rhodocoma	rose-red hair	Restionaceae	Poales	Ba	
Rhododendron	rose-red tree. Greek and Latin name.	Ericaceae	Ericales	CS	G
Rhodohypoxis	rose-red Hypoxis	Hypoxidaceae	Asparagales	CS	G
Rhodomyrtus	rose-red myrtle	Myrtaceae	Myrtales	St	
Rhodospatha	rose-red spathe	Araceae	Alismatales	St	
Rhodothamnus	rose-red shrub (the flowers)	Ericaceae	Ericales	St	G
Rhodotypos	rose-red type (the flowers)	Rosaceae	Rosales	CS	G
Rhoicissus	from Latin and Greek names	Vitaceae	Vitales	St	G
Rhombophyllum	rhomboid leaves	Aizoaceae	Caryophyllales	St	G
Rhopalostylis	club pillar (the spadix)	Arecaceae	Arecales	St	G
Rhus	Greek and Latin name	Anacardiaceae	Sapindales	CS	G
Rhynchelytrum	beak husk (on the flowers)	Poaceae	Poales	St	G
Rhyncholaelia	snout Laelia	Orchidaceae	Asparagales	Ba	
Rhynchosia	beak (the lower petals)	Fabaceae	Fabales	St	G
Rhynchostylis	beak pillar (the column of the flowers)	Orchidaceae	Asparagales	St	
Ribes	Arabic: acidic (the fruit). Arabic name.	Grossulariaceae	Saxifragales	CS	G
Ricinus	Latin: tick (the seeds)	Euphorbiaceae	Malpighiales	CS	G
Ripogonum	wicker knees (the many joints on the tangled stalks). Previously Rhipogonum.	Ripogonaceae	Liliales	St	G
Robinsonia	Daniel Defoe's Robinson Crusoe (Note: This list includes fictional and unattested characters; also see List of plant genera named after people (Q–Z).)	Asteraceae	Asterales	Bu	
Rockinghamia	Rockingham Bay in Queensland, Australia	Euphorbiaceae	Malpighiales	Bu	
Romulea	Romulus of mythology	Iridaceae	Asparagales	St	G
Rorippa	German name	Brassicaceae	Brassicales	St	G
Rosa	Latin name	Rosaceae	Rosales	CS	G
Rosselia	Rossel Island of Papua New Guinea	Burseraceae	Sapindales	Bu	
Rosularia	little rosettes	Crassulaceae	Saxifragales	Ba	G
Rotala	wheel-like (the whorls of leaves)	Lythraceae	Myrtales	St	
Roupala	Guyanese name	Proteaceae	Proteales	St	
Rubia	Latin: red (the roots, used in dyeing)	Rubiaceae	Gentianales	St	G
Rubus	Latin name	Rosaceae	Rosales	CS	G
Rumex	Latin name	Polygonaceae	Caryophyllales	CS	G
Ruscus	Latin name	Asparagaceae	Asparagales	CS	G
Ruta	Latin name	Rutaceae	Sapindales	CS	G
Sabal	South American name	Arecaceae	Arecales	St	G
Sabazia	epithet of the god Dionysus	Asteraceae	Asterales	Bu	
Saccharum	sugar	Poaceae	Poales	CS	G
Saccolabium	baggy lip	Orchidaceae	Asparagales	St	
Sagina	Latin: fodder	Caryophyllaceae	Caryophyllales	CS	G
Sagittaria	arrow (the leaves)	Alismataceae	Alismatales	CS	G
Salacia	Salacia, a goddess	Celastraceae	Celastrales	Bu	
Salicornia	Latin: salt (-marsh) horn (the branches)	Amaranthaceae	Caryophyllales	St	G
Salix	Latin name	Salicaceae	Malpighiales	CS	G
Salpichroa	trumpet + colour (the flowers)	Solanaceae	Solanales	St	G
Salpiglossis	trumpet tongue (the style)	Solanaceae	Solanales	St	G
Salsola	Latin: salt (the habitat)	Amaranthaceae	Caryophyllales	St	G
Salvia	Latin name	Lamiaceae	Lamiales	CS	G
Samanea	South American name	Fabaceae	Fabales	St	G
Sambucus	Latin name	Viburnaceae	Dipsacales	CS	G
Samolus	Latin name	Primulaceae	Ericales	St	G
Sanguinaria	Latin: blood (the sap)	Papaveraceae	Ranunculales	CS	G
Sanguisorba	Latin: blood-absorbing (the styptic roots)	Rosaceae	Rosales	CS	G
Sanicula	Latin: little healer	Apiaceae	Apiales	Ba	G
Santalum	Greek and Latin name	Santalaceae	Santalales	St	G
Santolina	Latin name	Asteraceae	Asterales	CS	G
Sapindus	Latin: soap of India	Sapindaceae	Sapindales	St	G
Sapium	Latin name	Euphorbiaceae	Malpighiales	St	G
Saponaria	Latin: soap	Caryophyllaceae	Caryophyllales	CS	G
Saraca	East Indian name	Fabaceae	Fabales	St	G
Sarcocaulon	fleshy stems	Geraniaceae	Geraniales	St	
Sarcochilus	fleshy lips	Orchidaceae	Asparagales	St	
Sarcococca	fleshy berries	Buxaceae	Buxales	CS	G
Sarcostemma	fleshy garland	Apocynaceae	Gentianales	St	G
Saruma	anagram of Asarum	Aristolochiaceae	Piperales	Ba	
Sasa	Japanese name	Poaceae	Poales	CS	G
Sassafras	Spanish name	Lauraceae	Laurales	St	G
Satureja	Latin name, from Arabic	Lamiaceae	Lamiales	CS	G
Satyria	satyrs, mythological creatures	Ericaceae	Ericales	Bu	
Satyrium	Greek name; also from satyrs, mythological creatures	Orchidaceae	Asparagales	Bu	G
Sauromatum	lizard	Araceae	Alismatales	St	G
Saururus	lizard tail	Saururaceae	Piperales	St	G
Saxifraga	Latin: stone-breaking	Saxifragaceae	Saxifragales	CS	G
Scabiosa	itching	Caprifoliaceae	Dipsacales	CS	G
Scadoxus	umbel glory	Amaryllidaceae	Asparagales	St	G
Schima	shade	Theaceae	Ericales	Ba	G
Schinus	Greek and Latin name	Anacardiaceae	Sapindales	St	G
Schisandra	divided male parts (the anthers)	Schisandraceae	Austrobaileyales	CS	G
Schismatoglottis	divided tongue (the spathes)	Araceae	Alismatales	St	
Schizachyrium	split chaff	Poaceae	Poales	Ba	G
Schizanthus	divided flowers	Solanaceae	Solanales	St	G
Schizocodon	divided bell (the corollas)	Diapensiaceae	Ericales	St	
Schizolobium	divided lobe (the pods)	Fabaceae	Fabales	St	G
Schizopetalon	divided petals	Brassicaceae	Brassicales	St	G
Schizophragma	divided wall (the septa in the fruit)	Hydrangeaceae	Cornales	CS	G
Sciadopitys	umbel or parasol + pine or fir (the leaves)	Sciadopityaceae	Pinales	CS	G
Scilla	Greek and Latin name	Asparagaceae	Asparagales	CS	G
Scindapsus	Greek name	Araceae	Alismatales	St	G
Scirpus	Latin name	Cyperaceae	Poales	CS	G
Scleranthus	hard flowers	Caryophyllaceae	Caryophyllales	St	G
Sclerocactus	harsh cactus (the spines)	Cactaceae	Caryophyllales	St	
Scoliopus	bent (the flower stalks)	Liliaceae	Liliales	St	G
Scolopia	thorn	Salicaceae	Malpighiales	Bu	
Scolymus	Greek and Latin name	Asteraceae	Asterales	St	G
Scopelogena	high cliffs (the habitat)	Aizoaceae	Caryophyllales	Bu	
Scorpiurus	scorpion tail (the pods)	Fabaceae	Fabales	St	G
Scorzonera	Old French and Italian derivation	Asteraceae	Asterales	St	G
Scrophularia	Latin: scrofula	Scrophulariaceae	Lamiales	CS	G
Scutellaria	Latin: saucer (on the fruiting calyx)	Lamiaceae	Lamiales	CS	G
Scuticaria	Latin: whip (the leaves)	Orchidaceae	Asparagales	St	
Scyphanthus	beaker flowers	Loasaceae	Cornales	St	G
Scyphostegia	beaker cover	Salicaceae	Malpighiales	St	
Secale	Latin name	Poaceae	Poales	St	G
Sechium	from a West Indian name	Cucurbitaceae	Cucurbitales	St	G
Securidaca	Latin: axe (on the end of the pods)	Polygalaceae	Fabales	St	G
Securigera	Latin: axe-bearing (the pods are axe-shaped)	Fabaceae	Fabales	St	G
Sedum	Latin: sitting (on rocks and walls). Latin name.	Crassulaceae	Saxifragales	CS	G
Selago	Latin name	Scrophulariaceae	Lamiales	Ba	G
Selenia	Selene, a moon goddess	Brassicaceae	Brassicales	Bu	
Selenicereus	moon (night-blooming) Cereus	Cactaceae	Caryophyllales	St	G
Selenipedium	moon sandal (the lip of the flowers)	Orchidaceae	Asparagales	St	
Selinum	Greek name	Apiaceae	Apiales	Ba	G
Semele	Semele of mythology	Asparagaceae	Asparagales	St	G
Semiaquilegia	Latin: half Aquilegia	Ranunculaceae	Ranunculales	Ba	G
Semiarundinaria	Latin: half Arundinaria	Poaceae	Poales	Ba	G
Sempervivum	Latin: ever-living. Latin name.	Crassulaceae	Saxifragales	CS	G
Senecio	Latin: old man (the whitish hairs on the fruit)	Asteraceae	Asterales	CS	G
Senna	Arabic name	Fabaceae	Fabales	Ba	G
Serapias	Serapis of mythology	Orchidaceae	Asparagales	St	G
Sericocarpus	silky fruit	Asteraceae	Asterales	St	G
Serissa	East Indian name	Rubiaceae	Gentianales	St	G
Serratula	Latin: little saw (the leaf edges)	Asteraceae	Asterales	CS	G
Sesamum	Greek and Latin name, from a Semitic name	Pedaliaceae	Lamiales	St	G
Sesbania	from an Arabic name	Fabaceae	Fabales	St	G
Seseli	Greek and Latin name	Apiaceae	Apiales	St	G
Setaria	bristles (on the spikelet)	Poaceae	Poales	CS	G
Sibiraea	Siberia	Rosaceae	Rosales	St	G
Sicana	from a Peruvian name	Cucurbitaceae	Cucurbitales	St	
Sicyos	Greek and Latin name	Cucurbitaceae	Cucurbitales	St	G
Sida	Greek name	Malvaceae	Malvales	St	G
Sidalcea	from Sida and Alcea	Malvaceae	Malvales	CS	G
Siderasis	rusty fur (the reddish hair)	Commelinaceae	Commelinales	St	
Sideritis	Greek and Latin name	Lamiaceae	Lamiales	St	G
Sideroxylon	iron wood	Sapotaceae	Ericales	St	G
Siegfriedia	Siegfried, a legendary hero	Rhamnaceae	Rosales	Bu	
Silene	Greek name	Caryophyllaceae	Caryophyllales	CS	G
Silphium	Greek and Latin name	Asteraceae	Asterales	CS	G
Silybum	Greek name	Asteraceae	Asterales	CS	G
Simethis	Symaethis, one of the Naiads of Greek myth. Also Symethus.	Asphodelaceae	Asparagales	St	G
Sinapis	Latin name	Brassicaceae	Brassicales	St	G
Sinobambusa	Chinese Bambusa	Poaceae	Poales	Ba	G
Sinomenium	Chinese moon (the curved fruit-stone)	Menispermaceae	Ranunculales	St	G
Siphocampylus	tubes bending (the corollas)	Campanulaceae	Asterales	St	G
Sisymbrium	Greek and Latin name	Brassicaceae	Brassicales	St	G
Sisyrinchium	Greek name	Iridaceae	Asparagales	CS	G
Sium	Greek name	Apiaceae	Apiales	St	G
Skimmia	from a Japanese name	Rutaceae	Sapindales	CS	G
Smilax	Greek and Latin name	Smilacaceae	Liliales	CS	G
Smyrnium	myrrh-scented	Apiaceae	Apiales	CS	G
Solanum	Latin name	Solanaceae	Solanales	CS	G
Soldanella	little coin, probably (the leaves)	Primulaceae	Ericales	St	G
Solidago	Latin: making whole (for supposed healing properties)	Asteraceae	Asterales	CS	G
Sonchus	Greek and Latin name	Asteraceae	Asterales	St	G
Sonerila	Malabar name	Melastomataceae	Myrtales	St	
Sophora	from an Arabic name	Fabaceae	Fabales	CS	G
Sorbaria	Sorbus-like	Rosaceae	Rosales	CS	G
Sorbus	Latin name	Rosaceae	Rosales	CS	G
Sorghum	from an Italian name	Poaceae	Poales	St	G
Sparaxis	torn (spathes)	Iridaceae	Asparagales	St	G
Sparganium	ribbon (the leaves). Greek and Latin name.	Typhaceae	Poales	CS	G
Spartium	Greek name	Fabaceae	Fabales	CS	G
Spathiphyllum	spathe leaves	Araceae	Alismatales	CS	G
Spathodea	spathe-like (calyx)	Bignoniaceae	Lamiales	St	G
Spathoglottis	spathe tongue (the lip)	Orchidaceae	Asparagales	St	
Speirantha	spiral flowers	Asparagaceae	Asparagales	Ba	G
Sphaeralcea	globe (the fruit) + Alcea	Malvaceae	Malvales	CS	G
Spilanthes	dotted flowers (dotted with pollen)	Asteraceae	Asterales	St	G
Spinacia	from an Arabic and Persian name	Amaranthaceae	Caryophyllales	CS	G
Spiraea	Greek and Latin name	Rosaceae	Rosales	CS	G
Spiranthes	spiral flowers	Orchidaceae	Asparagales	St	G
Spondias	Greek name	Anacardiaceae	Sapindales	St	G
Spyridium	basket-like (calyx)	Rhamnaceae	Rosales	St	
Stachys	Greek and Latin name	Lamiaceae	Lamiales	CS	G
Stachytarpheta	spike thicket	Verbenaceae	Lamiales	St	G
Stachyurus	spike tail (the inflorescences)	Stachyuraceae	Crossosomatales	CS	G
Staphylea	clusters (of flowers)	Staphyleaceae	Crossosomatales	CS	G
Stelis	Greek name	Orchidaceae	Asparagales	St	
Stellaria	Latin: star (the flowers)	Caryophyllaceae	Caryophyllales	St	G
Stenandrium	narrow male parts (the stamens)	Acanthaceae	Lamiales	St	
Stenanthium	narrow flower (sepals and petals)	Melanthiaceae	Liliales	St	G
Stenocactus	narrow cactus	Cactaceae	Caryophyllales	Ba	
Stenocarpus	narrow fruit	Proteaceae	Proteales	St	G
Stenocereus	narrow Cereus	Cactaceae	Caryophyllales	Ba	
Stenoglottis	narrow (lip) tongue	Orchidaceae	Asparagales	St	G
Stenospermation	narrow seedlet	Araceae	Alismatales	St	
Stenotaphrum	narrow trench (on the stalks)	Poaceae	Poales	St	G
Stephanotis	Greek name	Apocynaceae	Gentianales	St	G
Sterculia	Sterquilinus of mythology	Malvaceae	Malvales	St	G
Stictocardia	spotted heart (-shaped leaves)	Convolvulaceae	Solanales	St	G
Stigmaphyllon	stigma leaves	Malpighiaceae	Malpighiales	St	G
Stipa	coarse fiber (Note: See for instance στυππεῖον.)	Poaceae	Poales	CS	G
Stomatium	mouth	Aizoaceae	Caryophyllales	St	G
Stratiotes	Greek and Latin name	Hydrocharitaceae	Alismatales	St	G
Streptocarpus	twisted fruit	Gesneriaceae	Lamiales	CS	G
Streptopus	twisted stalks	Liliaceae	Liliales	St	G
Streptosolen	twisted (corolla) tubes	Solanaceae	Solanales	St	G
Strobilanthes	cone of flowers	Acanthaceae	Lamiales	CS	G
Stromanthe	bed of flowers (the inflorescences)	Marantaceae	Zingiberales	St	G
Strombocactus	spinning-top cactus	Cactaceae	Caryophyllales	St	G
Strongylodon	rounded (calyx) teeth	Fabaceae	Fabales	St	
Strophanthus	cord flowers	Apocynaceae	Gentianales	St	G
Strychnos	Greek and Latin name	Loganiaceae	Gentianales	St	G
Stylidium	little pillar (the style and stamens form a column)	Stylidiaceae	Asterales	St	G
Stylophorum	style-bearing	Papaveraceae	Ranunculales	St	G
Styphnolobium	harsh pod	Fabaceae	Fabales	Ba	G
Styrax	Greek and Latin name, from an Arabic name	Styracaceae	Ericales	CS	G
Succisa	truncated (the rhizome)	Caprifoliaceae	Dipsacales	CS	G
Swida	Czech name	Cornaceae	Cornales	St	
Syagrus	Latin name	Arecaceae	Arecales	Ba	G
Sycopsis	fig-like (the leaves)	Hamamelidaceae	Saxifragales	CS	G
Symphoricarpos	clusters bearing fruit	Caprifoliaceae	Dipsacales	CS	G
Symphyotrichum	joined hairs	Asteraceae	Asterales	Ba	
Symphytum	Greek and Latin name	Boraginaceae	Boraginales	CS	G
Symplocarpus	combination fruit (the ovaries grow together)	Araceae	Alismatales	St	G
Symplocos	combination (the unified stamens)	Symplocaceae	Ericales	St	G
Synechanthus	continuous flowers	Arecaceae	Arecales	St	
Syneilesis	rolling up	Asteraceae	Asterales	Ba	G
Syngonium	united gonads (the ovaries)	Araceae	Alismatales	St	G
Syringa	pipe (the stems)	Oleaceae	Lamiales	CS	G
Syzygium	joined	Myrtaceae	Myrtales	St	G
Tabebuia	Brazilian name	Bignoniaceae	Lamiales	St	G
Tacca	from an Indonesian name	Dioscoreaceae	Dioscoreales	St	G
Tagetes	Tages of mythology	Asteraceae	Asterales	CS	G
Taiwania	Taiwan	Cupressaceae	Pinales	St	G
Talinum	(unclear)	Talinaceae	Caryophyllales	Ba	G
Tamarindus	from an Arabic name	Fabaceae	Fabales	St	G
Tamarix	Latin name	Tamaricaceae	Caryophyllales	CS	G
Tanacetum	from a Medieval Latin name	Asteraceae	Asterales	CS	G
Tapeinochilos	short lip	Costaceae	Zingiberales	St	G
Taraxacum	from an Arabic and Persian name	Asteraceae	Asterales	St	G
Taxodium	Taxus-like	Cupressaceae	Pinales	CS	G
Taxus	Latin name	Taxaceae	Pinales	CS	G
Tecoma	from a Nahuatl name	Bignoniaceae	Lamiales	CS	G
Tectona	from a Tamil name	Lamiaceae	Lamiales	St	G
Telephium	Latin name; also from Telephus, a mythological king	Molluginaceae	Caryophyllales	Bu	G
Tellima	anagram of Mitella	Saxifragaceae	Saxifragales	CS	G
Telopea	distant viewing (the flowers)	Proteaceae	Proteales	CS	G
Telosma	distant scent	Apocynaceae	Gentianales	St	G
Tephrosia	ashen (the leaves)	Fabaceae	Fabales	St	G
Terminalia	Latin: terminal (the leaves are at the end of the shoots)	Combretaceae	Myrtales	St	G
Tetracentron	four spurs (on the fruit)	Trochodendraceae	Trochodendrales	St	G
Tetraclinis	four + bed (of leaves)	Cupressaceae	Pinales	St	G
Tetradium	foursome	Rutaceae	Sapindales	Ba	G
Tetragonia	four-angled (fruit)	Aizoaceae	Caryophyllales	CS	G
Tetragonolobus	four-angled pods	Fabaceae	Fabales	St	G
Tetranema	four threads (the stamens)	Plantaginaceae	Lamiales	St	G
Tetrapanax	four (-petalled) Panax	Araliaceae	Apiales	CS	G
Tetrastigma	four-part stigma	Vitaceae	Vitales	Ba	G
Tetratheca	four boxes (the anthers)	Elaeocarpaceae	Oxalidales	St	G
Teucrium	Greek and Latin name	Lamiaceae	Lamiales	CS	G
Thalassia	Thalassa, a sea divinity	Hydrocharitaceae	Alismatales	Bu	G
Thalassodendron	Thalassa (a sea divinity) + tree	Cymodoceaceae	Alismatales	Bu	G
Thalictrum	Greek and Latin name	Ranunculaceae	Ranunculales	CS	G
Thamnocalamus	shrubby reed	Poaceae	Poales	Ba	G
Thaumasianthes	Thaumas, a god	Loranthaceae	Santalales	Bu	G
Thelesperma	nippled seeds	Asteraceae	Asterales	St	G
Thelocactus	nippled cactus	Cactaceae	Caryophyllales	St	G
Theobroma	god food	Malvaceae	Malvales	St	G
Thermopsis	lupin-like	Fabaceae	Fabales	CS	G
Thesium	Latin name	Santalaceae	Santalales	Bu	G
Thespesia	holy	Malvaceae	Malvales	St	G
Thladiantha	eunuch (staminode) flowers	Cucurbitaceae	Cucurbitales	St	G
Thlaspi	Greek and Latin name	Brassicaceae	Brassicales	St	G
Thrinax	trident	Arecaceae	Arecales	St	G
Thuja	Greek name	Cupressaceae	Pinales	CS	G
Thujopsis	Thuja-like	Cupressaceae	Pinales	CS	G
Thymus	Greek and Latin name	Lamiaceae	Lamiales	CS	G
Thysanotus	fringed (flowers)	Asparagaceae	Asparagales	St	G
Tiarella	little crown (the fruit)	Saxifragaceae	Saxifragales	CS	G
Tibouchina	from a Guianese name	Melastomataceae	Myrtales	St	G
Tigridia	Latin: tiger (flowers)	Iridaceae	Asparagales	CS	G
Tilia	Latin name	Malvaceae	Malvales	CS	G
Tipuana	from a South American name	Fabaceae	Fabales	St	G
Titanopsis	Titan (Helios) of mythology	Aizoaceae	Caryophyllales	St	G
Tithonia	Tithonus	Asteraceae	Asterales	St	G
Tococa	Guyanese name	Melastomataceae	Myrtales	St	G
Tolumnia	Tolumnia, a nymph	Orchidaceae	Asparagales	Bu	G
Toona	Sanskrit name	Meliaceae	Sapindales	Ba	G
Trachelium	neck	Campanulaceae	Asterales	St	G
Trachelospermum	neck (-shaped) seeds	Apocynaceae	Gentianales	CS	G
Trachycarpus	rough fruit	Arecaceae	Arecales	CS	G
Trachymene	rough membrane (on the fruits)	Apiaceae	Apiales	St	G
Trachystemon	rough stamens	Boraginaceae	Boraginales	CS	G
Tragopogon	goat beard (the silk)	Asteraceae	Asterales	St	G
Trapa	Latin: from caltrop (the four-pointed fruit)	Lythraceae	Myrtales	St	G
Trichilia	three-part (ovary)	Meliaceae	Sapindales	St	G
Trichodiadema	hairy crowns	Aizoaceae	Caryophyllales	St	G
Tricholaena	hairy cloak (on the spikelets)	Poaceae	Poales	St	G
Trichopilia	hairy cap (on the anthers)	Orchidaceae	Asparagales	St	G
Trichosanthes	hairy (fringed) flowers	Cucurbitaceae	Cucurbitales	St	G
Trichostema	hair-like stamens	Lamiaceae	Lamiales	St	G
Tricyrtis	three swellings (the red nectaries below the petals)	Liliaceae	Liliales	CS	G
Tridax	Greek and Latin name	Asteraceae	Asterales	St	G
Trifolium	three leaflets. Latin name.	Fabaceae	Fabales	CS	G
Trigonella	little three-cornered (flowers)	Fabaceae	Fabales	St	G
Trilisa	anagram of Liatris	Asteraceae	Asterales	St	G
Trillium	three (-leaved) Lilium	Melanthiaceae	Liliales	CS	G
Triosteum	three bones (the hard seeds)	Caprifoliaceae	Dipsacales	St	G
Triphasia	triple (the flower parts)	Rutaceae	Sapindales	St	G
Triplaris	triple (the flower parts)	Polygonaceae	Caryophyllales	St	G
Tripleurospermum	three-ribbed seeds (the achenes)	Asteraceae	Asterales	St	G
Tripogandra	three bearded male parts (the longer stamens)	Commelinaceae	Commelinales	St	G
Tripterygium	three wings (on the fruit)	Celastraceae	Celastrales	St	G
Trisetum	three bristles	Poaceae	Poales	St	G
Tristagma	three drops (the nectaries)	Amaryllidaceae	Asparagales	CS	G
Triteleia	triple-complete. Previously Tritelaia.	Asparagaceae	Asparagales	Ba	G
Trithrinax	three tridents (the leaves)	Arecaceae	Arecales	St	G
Triticum	Latin name	Poaceae	Poales	St	G
Tritonia	Latin: weather vane (a metaphor for the diverse stamens)	Iridaceae	Asparagales	CS	G
Tritoniopsis	Tritonia-like	Iridaceae	Asparagales	Bu	G
Trochodendron	wheel (appearance of the stamens) + tree	Trochodendraceae	Trochodendrales	CS	G
Trollius	from a Swiss German name	Ranunculaceae	Ranunculales	CS	G
Tropaeolum	trophy	Tropaeolaceae	Brassicales	CS	G
Tsuga	from a Japanese name	Pinaceae	Pinales	CS	G
Tuberaria	tuber-like (the thick roots)	Cistaceae	Malvales	St	G
Tulipa	Turkish: turban	Liliaceae	Liliales	CS	G
Tussilago	(remedy for) coughing	Asteraceae	Asterales	St	G
Typha	Greek and Latin name	Typhaceae	Poales	CS	G
Typhonium	Typhon, a mythological monster	Araceae	Alismatales	Bu	G
Ugni	Mapuche name	Myrtaceae	Myrtales	Ba	G
Ulex	Latin name	Fabaceae	Fabales	CS	G
Ullucus	Peruvian name	Basellaceae	Caryophyllales	St	G
Ulmus	Latin name	Ulmaceae	Rosales	CS	G
Umbellularia	Latin: little umbels	Lauraceae	Laurales	CS	G
Umbilicus	Latin: navels (in the leaves)	Crassulaceae	Saxifragales	CS	G
Uniola	Latin name	Poaceae	Poales	St	G
Unxia	epithet of the goddess Juno	Asteraceae	Asterales	Bu	
Urceolina	Latin: little pitcher (the flowers)	Amaryllidaceae	Asparagales	St	G
Urera	Latin: stinging	Urticaceae	Rosales	St	G
Urtica	Latin name	Urticaceae	Rosales	St	G
Utricularia	Latin: little bottles (that trap insects)	Lentibulariaceae	Lamiales	St	G
Uvaria	Latin: like a bunch of grapes	Annonaceae	Magnoliales	St	G
Uvularia	Latin: uvula (a metaphor for the hanging flowers)	Colchicaceae	Liliales	CS	G
Vaccaria	Latin: cow, possibly	Caryophyllaceae	Caryophyllales	St	G
Vaccinium	Latin name	Ericaceae	Ericales	CS	G
Valeriana	Medieval Latin name	Caprifoliaceae	Dipsacales	CS	G
Valerianella	Latin: little Valeriana	Caprifoliaceae	Dipsacales	St	G
Vallaris	Latin: fence stakes (which they sometimes grow on)	Apocynaceae	Gentianales	St	G
Vanda	from a Sanskrit name	Orchidaceae	Asparagales	St	G
Vandopsis	Vanda-like	Orchidaceae	Asparagales	St	G
Vanilla	Spanish name, derived from Latin: vagina (sheath), for the pods	Orchidaceae	Asparagales	St	G
Veratrum	Latin: true black (the roots)	Melanthiaceae	Liliales	CS	G
Verbascum	Latin name	Scrophulariaceae	Lamiales	CS	G
Verbena	Latin: ceremonial plant	Verbenaceae	Lamiales	CS	G
Verbesina	Latin: like Verbena	Asteraceae	Asterales	CS	G
Verticordia	Latin: turner of hearts (an epithet of Venus of mythology)	Myrtaceae	Myrtales	St	G
Viburnum	Latin name	Adoxaceae	Dipsacales	CS	G
Vicia	Latin: binding (the tendrils). Latin name.	Fabaceae	Fabales	CS	G
Vinca	Latin: winding around. Latin name.	Apocynaceae	Gentianales	CS	G
Vincetoxicum	Latin: conquering poison	Apocynaceae	Gentianales	St	G
Viola	Latin name	Violaceae	Malpighiales	CS	G
Viscum	Latin name	Santalaceae	Santalales	St	G
Vitex	Latin name	Lamiaceae	Lamiales	CS	G
Vitis	Latin name	Vitaceae	Vitales	CS	G
Wollemia	Wollemi National Park in Australia	Araucariaceae	Pinales	Ba	G
Xantheranthemum	yellow Eranthemum	Acanthaceae	Lamiales	St	G
Xanthisma	yellow (flowers)	Asteraceae	Asterales	CS	G
Xanthoceras	yellow horn (the glands between the petals)	Sapindaceae	Sapindales	CS	G
Xanthocyparis	yellow cypress	Cupressaceae	Pinales	Ba	G
Xanthorhiza	yellow root	Ranunculaceae	Ranunculales	CS	G
Xanthorrhoea	yellow sap	Asphodelaceae	Asparagales	St	G
Xanthosoma	yellow body	Araceae	Alismatales	St	G
Xeranthemum	(long-lasting) dry flowers	Asteraceae	Asterales	St	G
Xerochrysum	dry gold	Asteraceae	Asterales	Ba	
Xerophyllum	dry leaves	Melanthiaceae	Liliales	CS	G
Xylobium	wood-life (they are epiphytes)	Orchidaceae	Asparagales	St	G
Yucca	Caribbean name	Asparagaceae	Asparagales	CS	G
Yushania	Yu Shan	Poaceae	Poales	CS	
Zamia	from a Latin name	Zamiaceae	Cycadales	CS	G
Zamioculcas	Zamia + Arabic name	Araceae	Alismatales	Ba	G
Zanthoxylum	yellow wood	Rutaceae	Sapindales	St	G
Zea	Greek and Latin name	Poaceae	Poales	CS	G
Zelkova	from a Georgian name	Ulmaceae	Rosales	CS	G
Zemisia	Zemi, ancestral spirits of the Taíno	Asteraceae	Asterales	Bu	
Zephyra	Zephyrus, a god	Tecophilaeaceae	Asparagales	Bu	G
Zephyranthes	western flower	Amaryllidaceae	Asparagales	CS	G
Zigadenus	yoked glands (in pairs)	Melanthiaceae	Liliales	St	G
Zingiber	Greek and Latin name, from a Sanskrit name	Zingiberaceae	Zingiberales	St	G
Zizania	Greek and Latin name	Poaceae	Poales	St	G
Ziziphus	Greek and Latin name, from a Persian name	Rhamnaceae	Rosales	St	G
Zygopetalum	yoked petals	Orchidaceae	Asparagales	St	G

== See also ==
- Glossary of botanical terms
- List of Greek and Latin roots in English
- List of Latin and Greek words commonly used in systematic names
- List of plant genera named after people: A–C, D–J, K–P, Q–Z
- List of plant family names with etymologies
