= Differential fitness =

Postulate for natural selection in Darwinism

Differential fitness is the third of Darwin's four postulates for natural selection. It states that survival and reproduction rates vary between individuals. Fitness differentials are widespread and detectable throughout nature. This fitness differential is visible in several ways, and it can be detected throughout nature. It can be based on behavioral differences that can act with or against environmental changes; one notable example was a 2014 study of snowshoe hares, where researchers found that white snowshoe hares did not change their behavior due to increased snow melt. Subsequent research found that brown hares survived and bred more than the white snowshoe hares. Differential fitness can also be applied between species. Researchers found that the Neotoma macrotis wood rat in the California woodlands was responding to climate change by moving into a hybrid zone, and this gave it an advantage over the competing Neotoma fuscipes Differential fitness can also apply to multiple traits at once and at unequal levels. A study with Linum pubescens found that its floral traits were based on multiple different fitness factors. Differential fitness can also be based on the sex of organisms. Researchers found that there were differential survival rates between mothers and fathers in the mid-nineteenth century in Utah.

== Behavioral response differential fitness ==
Differential fitness can be based on responses to the environment, and these responses are variable. While some organisms may have the best phenotype for certain conditions, those with suboptimal phenotypes can attempt to compensate with behavioral changes. However, these changes are not always made. A 2014 study examined some of the effects of climate change on snowshoe hares (Lepus americanus) in the Arctic. The researchers found that while the new conditions, due to increased snow melt, favored brown snowshoe hares, uncamouflaged white snowshoe hares didn't change their behavior. Subsequent research in 2016 found that this failure to compensate led to decreased survival and fitness in the white snowshoe hares and in increased fitness in the brown snowshoe hares. However, environmental changes can also have deleterious behavioral impacts on individuals and populations. A 2014 study found that southern elephant seal (Mirounga leonina) females had a lower fitness due to behavioral changes attributed to climate change. They spent more time looking for food than eating, and simulations based on this behavioral shift pointed to reduced populations due to malnourished seal pups. These changes led to significant long-term deleterious effects on the population when the simulations modeled for a persistent behavioral change.

== Differential fitness between species ==
Differential fitness can be readily examined through interspecific interactions such as competition and predation. A changing environment can give certain species an advantage over others, and new environments can lead to new opportunities for species. One 2017 study found that two competing woodrat species (Neotoma fuscipes and Neotoma macrotis) in California responded to climate change differently; the smaller N. macrotis that utilized the hybrid zone in its range more effectively had the fitness advantage. Invasive species illustrate an extreme fitness differential. Since they usually lack direct counters in new environments, they have massive advantages over local competitors and prey. A 2018 study found that the New England cottontail (Sylvilagus transitionalis) was often outcompeted by the invasive eastern cottontail (Sylvilagus floridanus) due to woodland clearing. While both species could utilize the invasive plants, the eastern cottontails had a fitness advantage over the native species in the same expanding environment, and this has led to the decline of the New England cottontail. The Burmese pythons (Python bivittatus) in Florida also present a stark example of differential fitness due to competition and predation by an invasive species upon native predators such as the raccoon. A 2017 study found that pythons within the Everglades had eliminated the local rabbits, and that they had also nearly eliminated the local opossum, raccoon, and bobcat populations due to their fitness advantages.

== Multitrait differential fitness ==
An individual's fitness is often determined by multiple traits, and these traits might respond to different selective pressures. The interplay between these traits and their pressures will impact an organism's fitness. For example, multiple floral traits can have different fitness benefits and pressures due to pollinators and environmental conditions. A 2017 study with Linum pubescens found that various traits had different fitness measures. Traits such as flower width and seed characteristics had different fitness measures and selective pressures. Animals are also subject to differential fitness due to multiple traits and pressures, and overarching pressures can act as fitness determinants. Traits such as color, shape, and vocalizations can be influenced by various factors, and they have different fitness contributions. A 2009 study examined the vocalizations, color, and shape in the Amazonian frog Allobates femoralis and the pressures that affected them. The researchers found that geography and mimicry acted independently on vocalizations and color, but shapes remained the same due to fitness pressures.

== Sex-based differential fitness ==
Individual fitness within a species is often determined by sex differences, and this often leads to differential fitness along those sex differences . Males can be the sex with higher fitness compared to individual females, and this is often illustrated in systems where male choice is more important (polygyny) or when males are larger than the females. Females may suffer and die due to childbirth in mammals, and this reduces their fitness compared to the males of the species. A 2007 study investigated the female and male mortality rates of human residents of Utah during the mid-nineteenth century, and they found that females died more often than males. This was often due to difficult and repeated childbirth in the region, and the loss of the female was more detrimental for the offspring than the loss of the male. Sex-based differential fitness can also favor females, and this is often illustrated in systems where female choice is more important or when females are larger than the males. However, these trends are not absolute. The differential fitness between sexes, like fitness due to environmental changes, can be negated by behavioral changes on the part of one of the sexes. The praying mantis females have been known to kill the males during mating. However, a 2017 study found that males can avoid this outcome via a behavioral change. The researchers found that the males in the praying mantis species Tenodera. angusitipennis ensured their survival by choosing fatter and less hungry females over skinnier ones, and this gave them a fitness advantage due to increased survival and reproduction.

== RNA world ==
It is widely assumed that “life” emerged in the prebiotic world when an informational molecule (usually considered to be similar to RNA) acquired the ability to replicate itself and undergo natural selection based on differential fitness. Among competing nucleotide sequence-dependent configurations of replicating RNA, differential fitness would determined the outcome of natural selection among the RNA replicators. As the evolution of such RNA replicators continued, sequences that balanced the conflicting needs of survival and replication would be selected.
