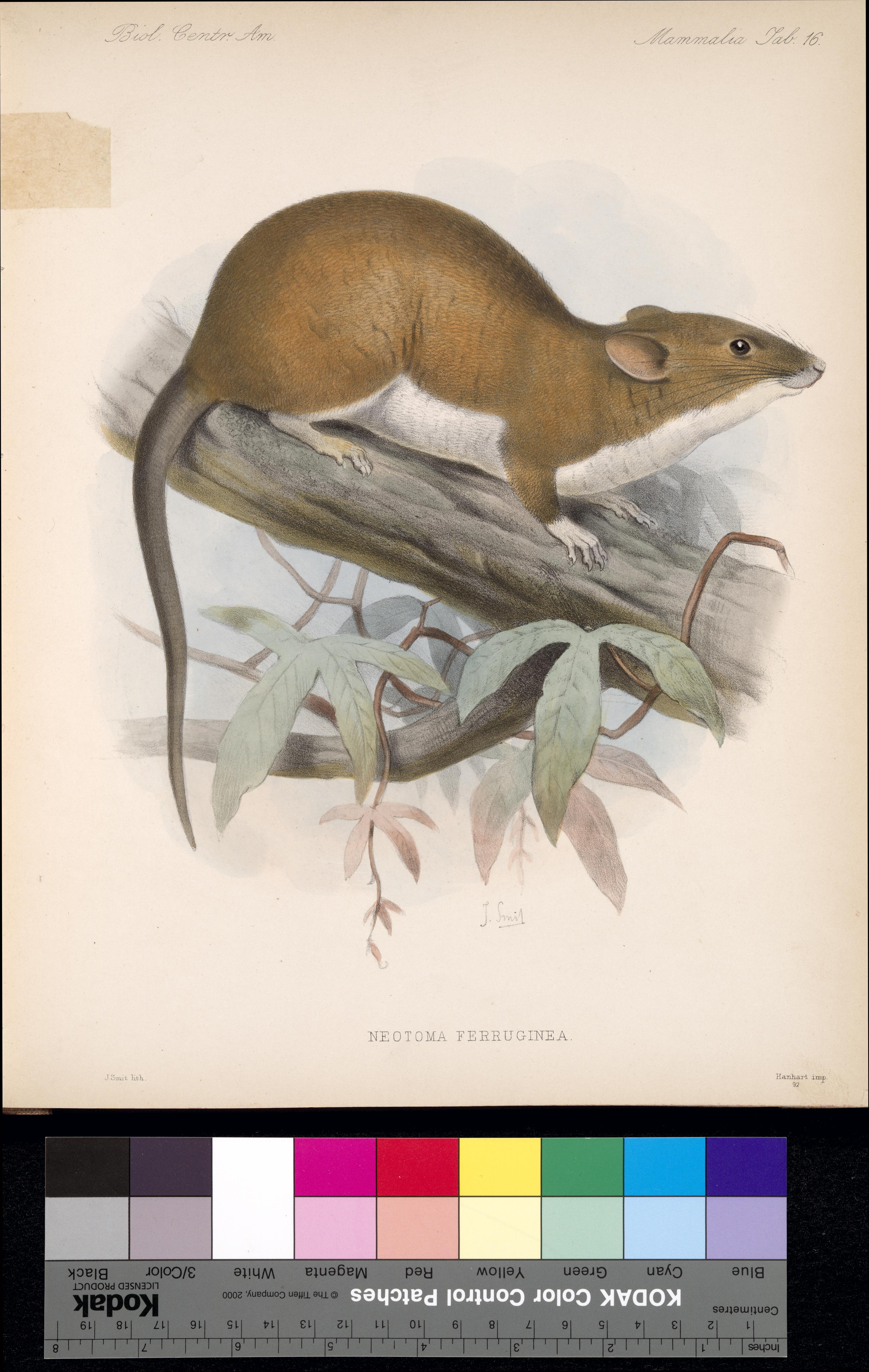

Scientific classification
- Kingdom: Animalia
- Phylum: Chordata
- Class: Mammalia
- Order: Rodentia
- Family: Cricetidae
- Subfamily: Neotominae
- Genus: Neotoma
- Species: N. ferruginea

Binomial name
- Neotoma ferruginea Tomes, 1862

= Guatemala woodrat =

Species of rodent

The Guatemala woodrat (Neotoma ferruginea), also called Tomes's woodrat, is a species of cricetid rodent from Mexico and northern Central America.

== Taxonomy ==
This species was described by Robert Fisher Tomes, an English zoologist, in 1862. In 1955, Emmett T. Hooper, an American zoologist, would lump this species with Neotoma mexicana, arguing that the two species were too similar where their respective ranges met. The two species would be considered loosely the same species until 2014, when a revision of the mexicana species group (at the time only containing Neotoma mexicana and Neotoma chrysomelas). This study found N. ferruginea & Neotoma picta to be distinct species, with the former having several subspecies. An additional study in 2021 referred more subspecies to this species, and showed N. ferruginea to be the sister species to N. picta from southern Mexico.

There are seven subspecies:

- Neotoma ferruginea ferruginea
- Neotoma ferruginea chamula
- Neotoma ferruginea isthmica
- Neotoma ferruginea parvidens
- Neotoma ferruginea solitaria (but see below)
- Neotoma ferruginea tropicalis
- Neotoma ferruginea vulcani

Molecular work has been done on all the subspecies except Neotoma ferruginea solitaria, but it is likely a subspecies of ferruginea given its range being so far removed from other Neotoma species.

This species is recognized by the American Society of Mammalogists, but not by the IUCN.

== Description ==
This is a relatively large cricetid, with a body length of 165 mm (6.5 in) and a tail length of 152 mm (6.0 in). They have an orange-brown color throughout their upperparts, brighter on the sides in most subspecies, with a bright white underside. The base of the hairs are dark. The whiskers are nearly as long as the head. The hind feet are much wider and longer than the forefeet. The tail is black, with relatively long hairs and more hairs near the tip of the tail than along its length.

== Range ==
This species occurs in western Honduras, western El Salvador, southern Guatemala, and southern Mexico, in the states of Chiapas, Oaxaca, Veracruz, Puebla, and Guerrero. Its range is bordered to the north by the Trans-Mexican Volcanic Belt, which forms the border between this species's range and that of the Mexican woodrat, although their ranges seem to meet in western Veracruz. It occurs in the Sierra Norte de Oaxaca, Sierra Sur de Oaxaca, and the southern part of the Sierra Madre del Sur. It occurs along the southern foothills along the Atlantic Ocean, but does not occur north of the Sierra Norte de Oaxaca. In Central America, it occurs in the Sierra Madre de Chiapas. The border between this species and the Nicaraguan woodrat is unknown.
