= Neotoma findleyi =

Findley's woodrat Temporal range: Late Pleistocene

Scientific classification
- Kingdom: Animalia
- Phylum: Chordata
- Class: Mammalia
- Infraclass: Placentalia
- Order: Rodentia
- Family: Cricetidae
- Subfamily: Neotominae
- Genus: Neotoma
- Species: †N. findleyi

Binomial name
- †Neotoma findleyi Harris, 1984

Extinct species of rodent

Neotoma findleyi, or Findley's woodrat, is an extinct species of rodent that was found in New Mexico. It lived during the Pleistocene, going extinct during the Rancholabrean.

== Naming ==
The rat was named in honour of James S. Findley, who trained a generation of mammalogists while at the University of New Mexico and was instrumental in building a greater knowledge of Southwestern mammals.

== Diagnosis ==
The holotype was found in the caves of New Mexico. Ages from the cave sites are 29,290 ± 1060 and 33,590 ± 1500 BP, respectively. They are thought to be somewhat older on the based on the faunal makeup from these around these sites as well as with problems with ages based on carbonates from the bones alone.

Findley's woodrat was between the size of the Mexican woodrat (N. mexicana) and bushy-tailed woodrat (N. cinerea), closer to former in most measurements. It has been hypothesized that Findley's woodrat may represent a population of bushy-tailed woodrats that became isolated in the during the Wisconsonian glaciation.
