= Ataenius brevicollis =

Scientific classification
- Kingdom: Animalia
- Phylum: Arthropoda
- Clade: Pancrustacea
- Class: Insecta
- Order: Coleoptera
- Suborder: Polyphaga
- Infraorder: Scarabaeiformia
- Family: Scarabaeidae
- Genus: Ataenius
- Species: A. brevicollis

Binomial name
- Ataenius brevicollis (Wollaston, 1854)

Synonyms
- Oxyomus brevicollis Wollaston, 1854; Ataenius lherminieri Paulian, 1947; Ataenius frankenbergeri Balthasar, 1938; Pleurophorus chopardi Paulian, 1937; Auperia sulcatula Chevrolat, 1865

Species of beetle

Ataenius brevicollis is a species of beetle of the family Scarabaeidae. It is found on the Canary Islands and Madeira, as well as in the United States (Florida, Mississippi, Texas), on the Bahamas, Cuba, the Dominican Republic, Guadeloupe and Jamaica.

== Description ==
Adults reach a length of about 3.6–4.3 mm (0.14–0.17 in). They have an oblong-oval, shining, piceous to black body.

== Life history ==
Specimens have been collected from various habitats, including beneath damp garden refuse and under putrid substances near beaches. Others were collected in rabbit droppings and in dung in nests of Neotoma floridana.
