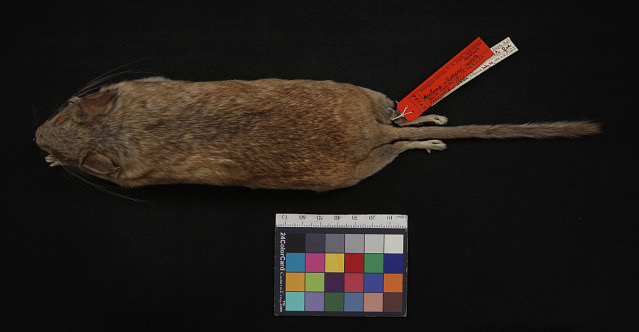

Conservation status
- Least Concern (IUCN 3.1)

Scientific classification
- Kingdom: Animalia
- Phylum: Chordata
- Class: Mammalia
- Order: Rodentia
- Family: Cricetidae
- Subfamily: Neotominae
- Genus: Neotoma
- Species: N. stephensi

Binomial name
- Neotoma stephensi Goldman, 1905

= Stephen's woodrat =

Stephens' woodrat

Species of rodent

Stephen's woodrat (Neotoma stephensi) is a species of rodent in the family Cricetidae found in Arizona, New Mexico and Utah in the United States.

== Description ==
Individuals of N. stephensi are small with long, silky fur and a slightly bushy tail. They are colored grayish buff with a paler head and a pinkish buff belly. They have white fur on their pectoral, inguinal (groin), foot, and occasionally throat regions. Their ears and topside of their tail have grayish-brown fur. They have a short and broad skull with a small and smoothly rounded braincase; broad, flat frontal region; large bullae; and a first upper molar without an antero-internal sulcus.

=== Similar species ===
N. stephensi resembles the species Neotoma lepida, but can be distinguished by its larger hind foot, color, and the shape of its skull, which is generally larger with a longer toothrow, larger interparietal bone, and smaller bullae than that of N. lepida.

== Habitat and distribution ==
N. stephensi was first identified in the Hualapai Mountains of Arizona at an altitude of 6,300 feet (1,900 m). N. stephensi inhabits rocky areas and mountains within pinyon-juniper woodlands, sometimes but not usually near cliffs. They may also live among yellow pines, cacti, or agave. Their middens are made of debris and constructed among rocks or around the bases of trees, as well as above ground in juniper. They occur in the ranges from central Arizona to southern Utah, western New Mexico to the north of Grant County, and up to the Mohave County in west Arizona, but may be extinct in Utah.

== Behavior ==
N. stephensi is nocturnal. They do not hibernate, and they do not aestivate.

=== Life cycle ===
One generation of N. stephensi is two years long. They breed in winter and early fall, and juveniles appear from March to May. N. stephensi may have up to two or more litters per year, from 1–5 offspring per litter with an average of two. Females are sexually mature at 9–10 months and typically do not survive to reproduce next season.

=== Diet ===
N. stephensi primarily consumes foliage and juniper seeds, and may learn to selectively eat junipers that have low levels of toxic defensive chemicals. They may also feed on Ephedra, but they are primarily a specialist species on Juniperus monosperma.

When compared to another woodrat species, the generalist species Neotoma albigula, the activity of the protein Permeability-glycoprotein (Pgp) was found to be 2.4 times higher in the small intestine of N. stephensi than that of N. albigula. Pgp is a transport protein that prevents toxins from entering epithelial cells, thus suggesting that it allows N. stephensi to consume a diet with much higher amounts of juniper leaves and the toxins within them.

== Conservation ==
N. stephensi is not threatened. Furthermore, there are protected areas in the natural range of N. stephensi.
