= Ataenius hirsutus =

Scientific classification
- Kingdom: Animalia
- Phylum: Arthropoda
- Clade: Pancrustacea
- Class: Insecta
- Order: Coleoptera
- Suborder: Polyphaga
- Infraorder: Scarabaeiformia
- Family: Scarabaeidae
- Genus: Ataenius
- Species: A. hirsutus

Binomial name
- Ataenius hirsutus Horn, 1871

Species of beetle

Ataenius hirsutus is a species of aphodiine dung beetle in the family Scarabaeidae. It is found in the United States (Arizona, Kansas, New Mexico, Texas) and Mexico (Baja California Sur, Chihuahua, Guerrero, Jalisco, Nayarit, Oaxaca, Puebla, Sinaloa, Sonora, Veracruz).

== Description ==
Adults reach a length of about 3.5–4.8 mm (0.14–0.19 in). They have an oblong, convex, moderately shiny, dark castaneous to piceous body. The elytra bear upright setae.

== Life history ==
Specimens have been collected in open meadows, and may also be found in the nest of Neotoma species.
