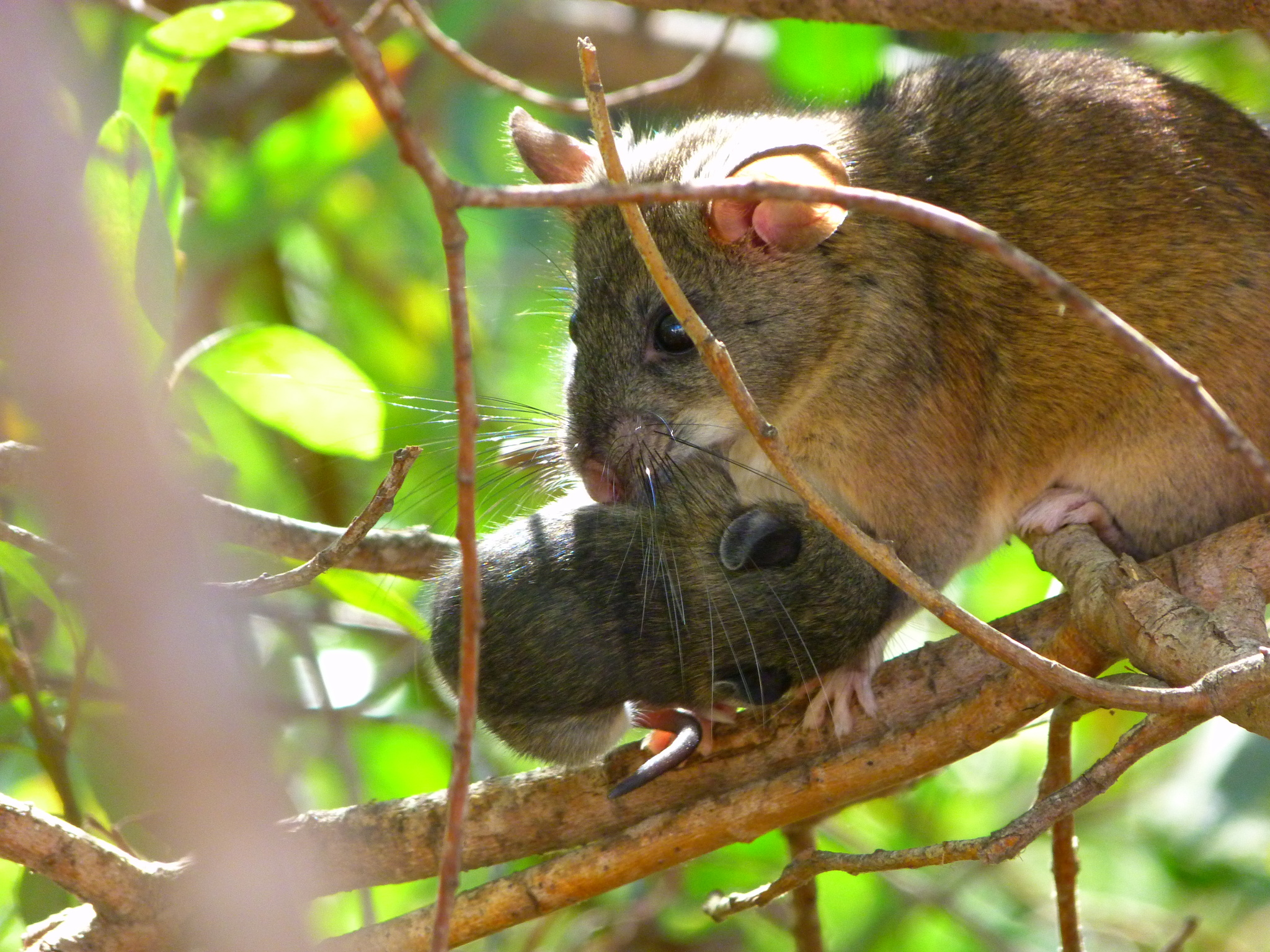

Conservation status
- Least Concern (IUCN 3.1)

Scientific classification
- Kingdom: Animalia
- Phylum: Chordata
- Class: Mammalia
- Order: Rodentia
- Family: Cricetidae
- Subfamily: Neotominae
- Genus: Neotoma
- Species: N. macrotis

Binomial name
- Neotoma macrotis Thomas, 1893

= Big-eared woodrat =

Species of rodent

The big-eared woodrat (Neotoma macrotis) is a nocturnal rodent of the woodrat genus Neotoma, in the family Cricetidae. Closely related to, and formerly included in the species Neotoma fuscipes, it is endemic to western North America and occurs west and south of the Salinas Valley from the California Coast Ranges south of Monterey Bay to northern Baja California, as well as in the Sierra Nevada, extending north to the South Fork American River.

The big-eared woodrat is light to dark brown in color, often with a lighter underside. It has characteristically large mobile ears, large eyes, and a long, fur covered tail. It is a primarily arboreal herbivore and functions as an important keystone species in oak and other forest ecosystems.

== Taxonomy ==
Although often misconstrued to be related to common rats, woodrats are not in fact part of the genus Rattus and are quite biologically and behaviorally different from them. See pack rat for similar species to the big-eared woodrat.

Following a morphological and molecular analysis conducted in 2002, the big-eared woodrat (Neotoma macrotis) was upgraded from a subspecies of the dusky-footed woodrat (Neotoma fuscipes) to be recognized as its own taxonomically distinct species. As a result of this relatively recent reclassification, much of the information regarding this species encompasses both big-eared and dusky-footed woodrats.

While the two species are quite visually similar, so much so that they are difficult to differentiate in most common sightings and encounters, morphologically, the big-eared woodrat can be distinguished from the dusky-footed woodrat through small differences in the anatomy of the skull and of the penis.

== Distribution and habitat ==
The big-eared woodrat inhabits the southern portion of what was formerly the range of the dusky-footed woodrat, with the latter woodrat species inhabiting the northern portion the range. Specifically, big-eared woodrats' can be found along the west coast of North America from just south of Monterey Bay to Baja California. They are also found in the southern Sierra Nevada mountains, much of Southern California, and have discontiguous populations in California's central valley. Their habitat consists of coastal chaparral, sage scrub, and densely wooded areas, with preferences for regions populated by coast live oak and with extensive understory plant coverage.

== Diet ==
The big-eared woodrat is primarily herbivorous, and consumes a wide variety of plants throughout its life. However, unlike most mammalian herbivores (which tend to be dietary generalists), big-eared woodrats have specialized to prefer consuming the leaves of plants that are very fibrous and that contain high quantities of tannins and other polyphenolics, such as oak trees. This unusual specialization allows them to capitalize on food sources that are both abundant and that lack major competition. Big-eared woodrats consume oak leaves as greater than 85% of their diet, and this specialization differentiates big-eared woodrats from other species in the Neotoma genus that prefer more mixed diets of a variety of plant species.

== Behavior and ecology ==
=== Diseases ===
A study of the species found the "Bear Canyon" virus, a mammarenavirus, traditionally associated with the California mouse, is actually passed by the big-eared woodrat before host-jumping to the California mouse.

== Conservation status ==
The big-eared woodrat is listed as a least-concern species by the International Union for Conservation of Nature, but there are growing conservation concerns due to habitat loss and fragmentation, which in Southern California is particularly caused by urbanization. This is a concern not only due to the potential for future declines in woodrat populations, but also due to the role these animals hold as an important prey species in the diets of predatory birds.
