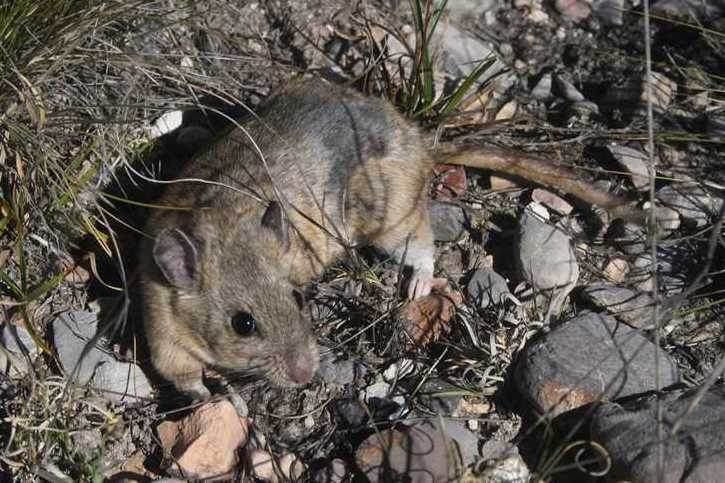

Conservation status
- Least Concern (IUCN 3.1)

Scientific classification
- Kingdom: Animalia
- Phylum: Chordata
- Class: Mammalia
- Order: Rodentia
- Family: Cricetidae
- Subfamily: Neotominae
- Genus: Neotoma
- Species: N. goldmani

Binomial name
- Neotoma goldmani Merriam, 1903

= Goldman's woodrat =

Species of rodent

Goldman's woodrat (Neotoma goldmani) is a rodent species in the family Cricetidae. It is found only in Mexico throughout the Mexican Plateau, stretching from southeastern Chihuahua to southern San Luis Potosí and northern Querétaro. The plateau is an average 5,988 ft (1,830 m) above sea level and covers a land area of 232,388 square miles (601,880 km^{2}).

N. goldmani is restricted to rocky and desert habitats and shelters itself in crevices. It exhibits a karyotype that qualifies it as a more primitive species than N. mexicana.

It is currently under no immediate threat, but has experienced a decrease in population due to habitat changes occurring throughout the Mexican Plateau area, a very highly populated area, which includes the states of Chihuahua, San Luis Potosí, Jalisco, and Mexico.

== Bibliography ==
- Musser, G. G.; Carleton, M. D. (2005). "Superfamily Muroidea". In Wilson, D. E.; Reeder, D. M. (eds.). Mammal Species of the World: A Taxonomic and Geographic Reference (3rd ed.). Johns Hopkins University Press. pp. 894–1531. ISBN 978-0-8018-8221-0. OCLC 62265494.
- Harris, C. P.; McCullough, D. A. (1988). "G-banded karyotype of Neotoma goldmani". The Southwestern Naturalist. 33 (2): 236–239.
- Hrachovy, S. K.; Bradley, R. D.; Jones, C. (1996). "Neotoma goldmani". Mammalian Species (545): 1–3.
