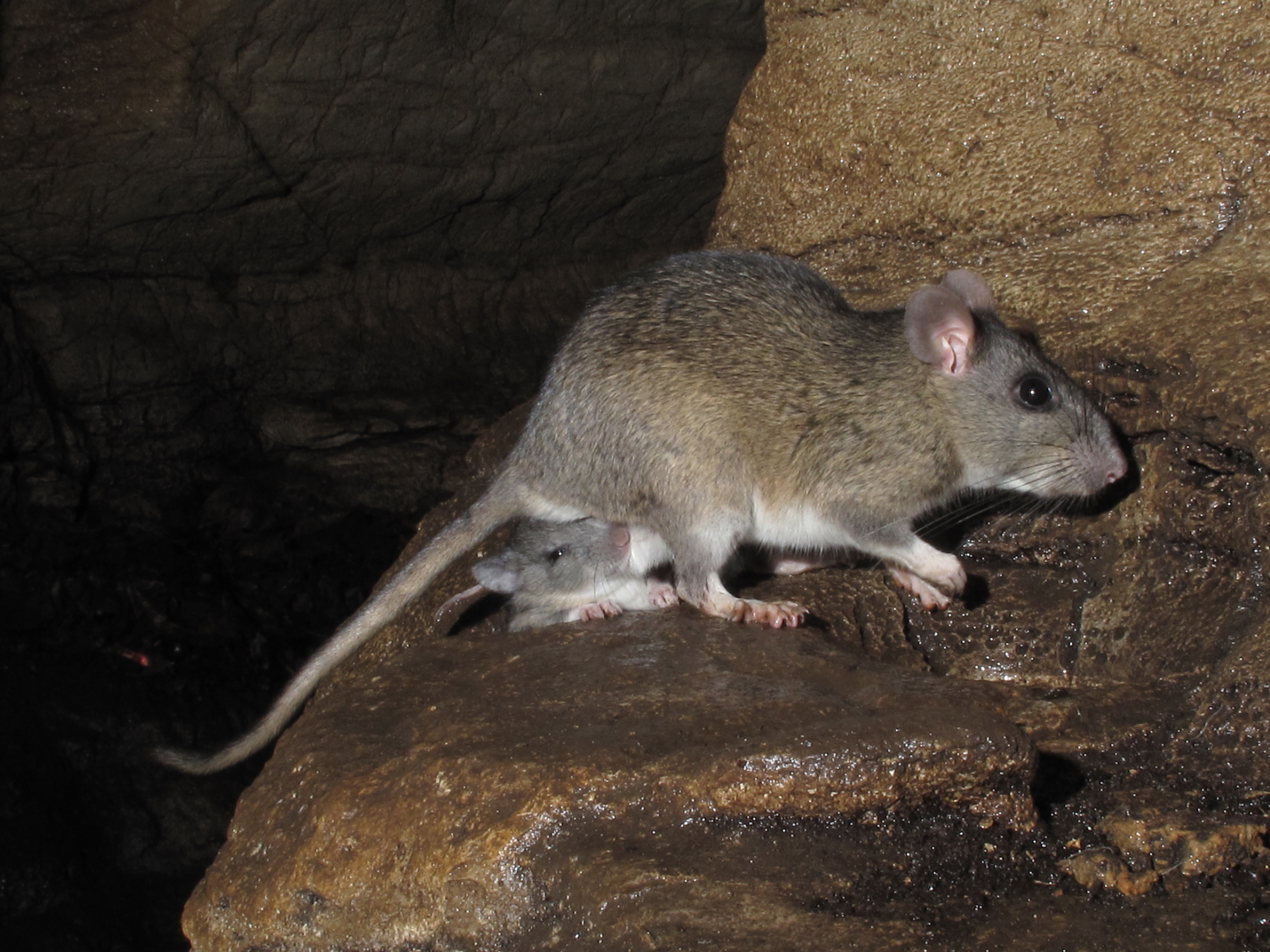

Conservation status
- Near Threatened (IUCN 3.1)

- Vulnerable (NatureServe)

Scientific classification
- Kingdom: Animalia
- Phylum: Chordata
- Class: Mammalia
- Order: Rodentia
- Family: Cricetidae
- Subfamily: Neotominae
- Genus: Neotoma
- Species: N. magister

Binomial name
- Neotoma magister Baird, 1857
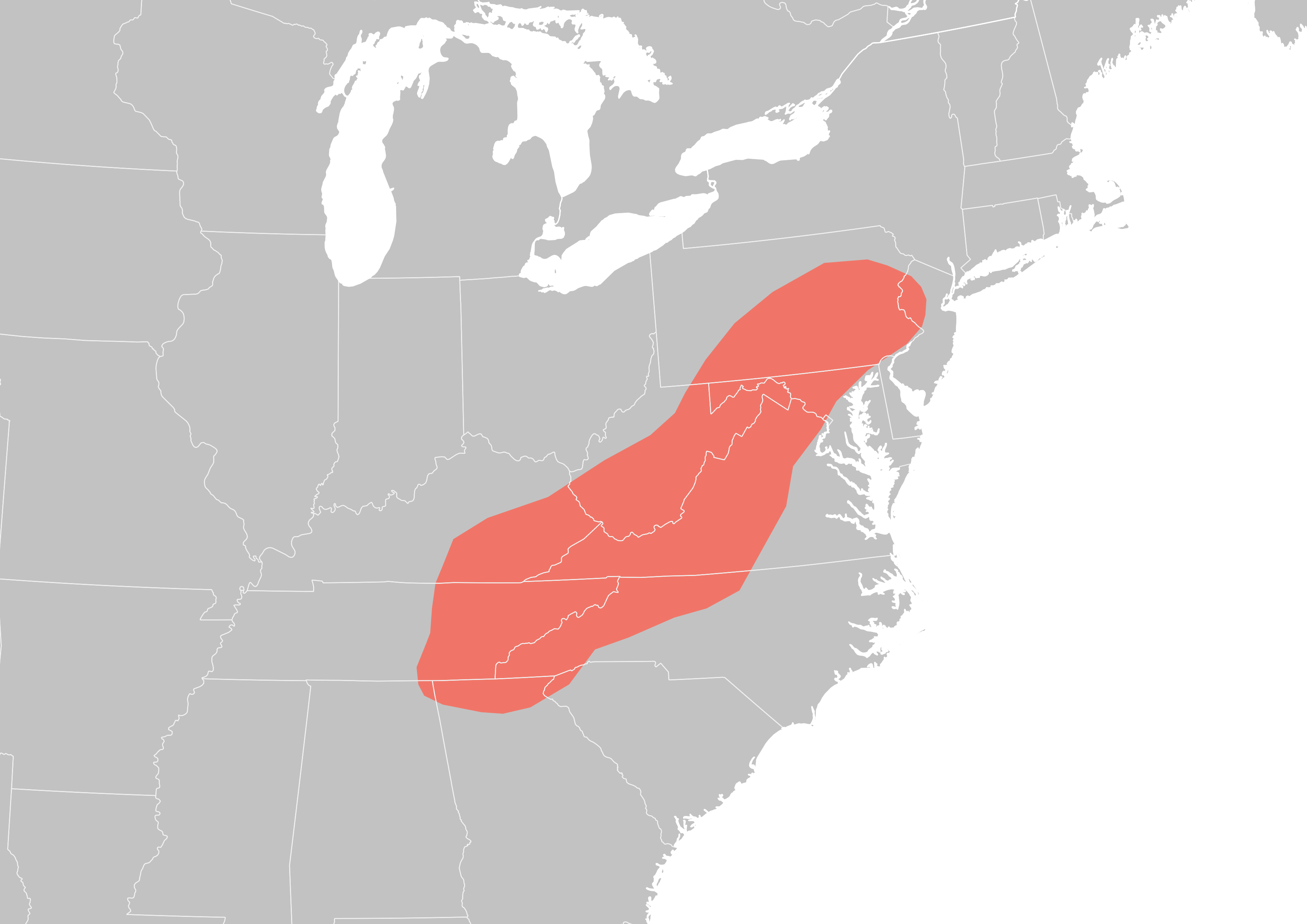
- Allegheny woodrat range

Synonyms
- Neotoma floridana magister

= Allegheny woodrat =

Species of rodent

The Allegheny woodrat (Neotoma magister), is a species of "pack rat" in the genus Neotoma. Once believed to be a subspecies of the eastern woodrat (Neotoma floridana), extensive DNA analysis has proven it to be a distinct species.

== Description ==
The Allegheny woodrat is a medium-sized rodent almost indistinguishable from the closely related eastern woodrat, although slightly larger on average, and often with longer whiskers. Adults typically range from 31 to 45 cm (12 to 18 in) in total length, including a tail measuring 15 to 21 cm (5.9 to 8.3 in). Males weigh 357 g (12.6 oz) on average, while females are slightly smaller, weighing an average of 337 g (11.9 oz).

It is the second-largest member of the native North American rats, and can weigh up to a pound, roughly the size of an eastern gray squirrel.

The fur is long, soft, and brownish-gray or cinnamon in color, while the undersides and feet are white. They have large eyes, and naked ears. Their most distinguishing feature is their tails: while the tails of European rats are naked with only slightly visible hairs, the tails of woodrats are completely furred with hairs about one-third of an inch long, and predominantly black above and white beneath.

The whiskers are unusually long, typically over 5 cm (2 in) in length. About 50 whiskers are found on each side, consisting of a mixture of stiff black hairs and softer white ones.

== Habitat and ecology ==
Allegheny woodrats prefer rocky outcrops associated with mountain ridges such as cliffs, caves, talus slopes, and even mines. This is mostly true for Pennsylvania and Maryland. In Virginia and West Virginia, woodrats are found on ridges, but also on side slopes in caves and talus (boulders and breakdown) fields. The surrounding forest is usually deciduous. Throughout their range, they are found in mixed pine-oak forest, but they are also found in a range of other forest types, most commonly with a mix of hardwood trees.

Their diets primarily consist of plant materials including buds, leaves, stems, fruits, seeds, acorns, and other nuts. They store their food in caches and eat about 5% of their body weight a day. Predators include owls, skunks, weasels, foxes, raccoons, bobcats, large snakes, and humans. At one point, the Allegheny rat was hunted for food and sometimes killed due to false identification based on its resemblance to more problematic European rats.

== Behavior ==
Nocturnal, Allegheny woodrats spend their nights foraging, collecting food and nesting materials. They are most active during the earlier part of the night, from about a half hour after sunset, and again shortly before dawn. During the summer, males have home ranges of about 6.5 ha (16 acres), and females of about 2.5 ha (6.2 acres). However, these contract dramatically in the late fall and winter, when little fresh food is available, and they rely instead on their caches to survive. At such times, home ranges may shrink to as little as 0.65 ha (1.6 acres).

Individuals are generally aggressive towards each other, especially when competing for nest sites, and, while home ranges may overlap, each actively defends its own den. They are generally quiet animals, but have been reported to make "squeaking" and "whimpering" noises in captivity.

They very rarely travel more than a few hundred feet from their home ranges.

They also collect and store various non-food items such as bottle caps, snail shells, coins, gun cartridges, feathers, and bones. This trait is responsible for the nickname "trade rat" or "pack rat". These rats form small colonies with nesting areas, a network of underground runways and many conspicuous latrines. Latrines are large fecal piles the rats deposit on protected flat rocks. In some cases, researchers have found dried leaves placed around the nesting area which appear to act as alarms to warn the rats of approaching danger.

In addition to the latrines, Allegheny woodrats of both sexes also scent mark various objects around their home ranges, using a scent gland on their undersides. The gland becomes particularly prominent around the breeding season, and is said to produce a strong odor.

== Reproduction ==
Unlike most other rodents, Allegheny woodrats are not prolific breeders. The breeding season is variable across their range, but is broadly between March and October, and they average two or three litters per year. Gestation lasts 30 to 36 days, and results in the birth of a litter of one to four young (typically two)

The young are born hairless and blind, weighing 15 to 17 g (0.53 to 0.60 oz). They become fully furred at two weeks, and open their eyes at three weeks. They live with their mothers in nests composed of grass, bark, and similar materials, often located in relatively inaccessible crevices or ledges.

Allegheny woodrats become sexually mature at three to four months of age, and, in the wild, have been known to live up to 58 months.

== Distribution and status ==
Allegheny woodrats are mainly distributed along the Appalachian Mountains. They have historically been found as far north as Connecticut (where they are now extirpated), southeastern New York (extirpated), northern New Jersey, and northern Pennsylvania southwestward through western Maryland, Tennessee, Kentucky, West Virginia, northern and western Virginia to northeastern Alabama and northwestern North Carolina with isolated populations north of the Ohio River in southern Ohio (extirpated excluding Adams County) and southern Indiana (reintroduced). The Tennessee River is generally accepted as the southern range limit. There are no recognised subspecies. Fossils belonging to the species are known from mid Pleistocene deposits in Maryland and West Virginia.

Although the Allegheny woodrat is not a federally listed threatened or endangered species, it is in major decline and is state listed:

State	Status
AL	Threatened
CT	Extirpated
IN	Endangered
KY	Apparently Secure
MA	Extirpated
MD	Endangered
NC	Endangered
NJ	Endangered
NY	Extirpated
OH	Endangered
PA	Threatened
TN	Threatened
VA	Species of Concern
WV	Threatened

== Causes and management of decline ==
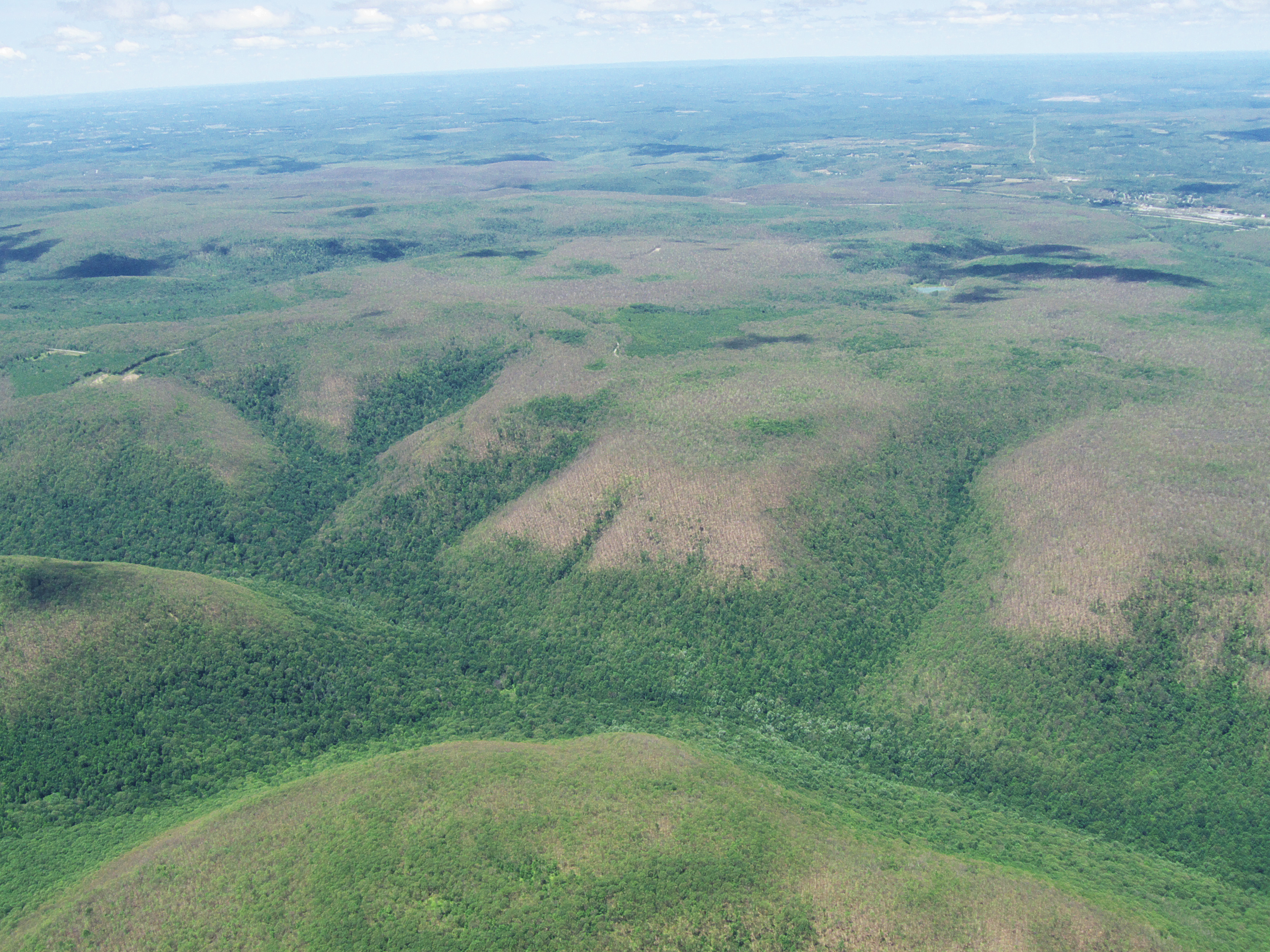
Spongy moth defoliation of hardwoods along the Allegheny Front near Snow Shoe, Pennsylvania, in July 2007, may be a cause of woodrat population declines.

In the northern parts of their range (New York, New Jersey and Pennsylvania), the Allegheny woodrat population has been in decline over the past 30 years. They have been extirpated from Connecticut and New York, as well as parts of Pennsylvania, New Jersey and Maryland.

The reasons for the decline are not yet entirely understood, but are believed to involve a combination of factors. The first is a parasite, the raccoon roundworm, Baylisascaris procyonis, which is almost always fatal to woodrats. Raccoons easily adapt to environmental change and have thrived in traditional woodrat habitat, causing infection of woodrats when they eat plant and seed material in raccoon feces that contain the parasite. Other frequently cited causes of decline include the near total loss of American chestnuts caused by chestnut blight and the defoliation of oak trees by an invasion of spongy moths (lowering available supplies of acorns for woodrats). Increased competition for acorns with overabundant white-tailed deer and growing populations of black bears and turkeys may also have a negative impact on woodrat survival. Predation by great horned owls has also been cited. Finally, increased human encroachment causes fragmentation and destruction of the woodrats' habitat.

Though present for at least 20,000 years in New York State, the Allegheny woodrat was extirpated from New York by 1987, perhaps due to an increase in the state's raccoon population from the 1960s onward. A reintroduction of 30 woodrats from West Virginia near Mohonk was a complete failure; the population was wiped out within a year, and of 52 animals, only 12 had inspectionable carcasses; 11 of the 12 had died from roundworm complications.

Indiana's Nongame and Endangered Wildlife Program currently monitors woodrat population status and distribution. They are also conducting field searches for new localities and research to identify the factors for decline.

New Jersey's Division of Fish and Wildlife's Endangered and Nongame Species Program supported research by Kathleen LoGiudice. She developed a drug to be distributed through bait that raccoons could eat. The drug would disrupt the growth and shedding of the roundworm parasite for about three weeks, curtailing deposition of roundworm eggs by raccoons near woodrat nesting sites. The anticipated result would be a reduction in the threat of the parasite to woodrats.

Pennsylvania is conducting a three-year study partially funded by a Game Commission State Wildlife Grant and being led by Indiana University of Pennsylvania in an attempt to shed light on the daily and seasonal movements of woodrats, identify high-quality woodrat habitat and learn whether providing food caches can boost a population. Their work will include radiotelemetry, DNA profiling and mark-recapture trapping.

Maryland's Department of Natural Resources has conducted trappings and surveys to study the woodrat's habitat.

Researchers at the University of Georgia have studied Allegheny woodrats in Virginia since 1990. Currently, they are investigating DNA relationships of Allegheny woodrats under a grant from the Virginia Department of Game and Inland Fisheries. They are comparing modern DNA to historic DNA from museum specimens as a way to characterize remnant genetic diversity in the species.
