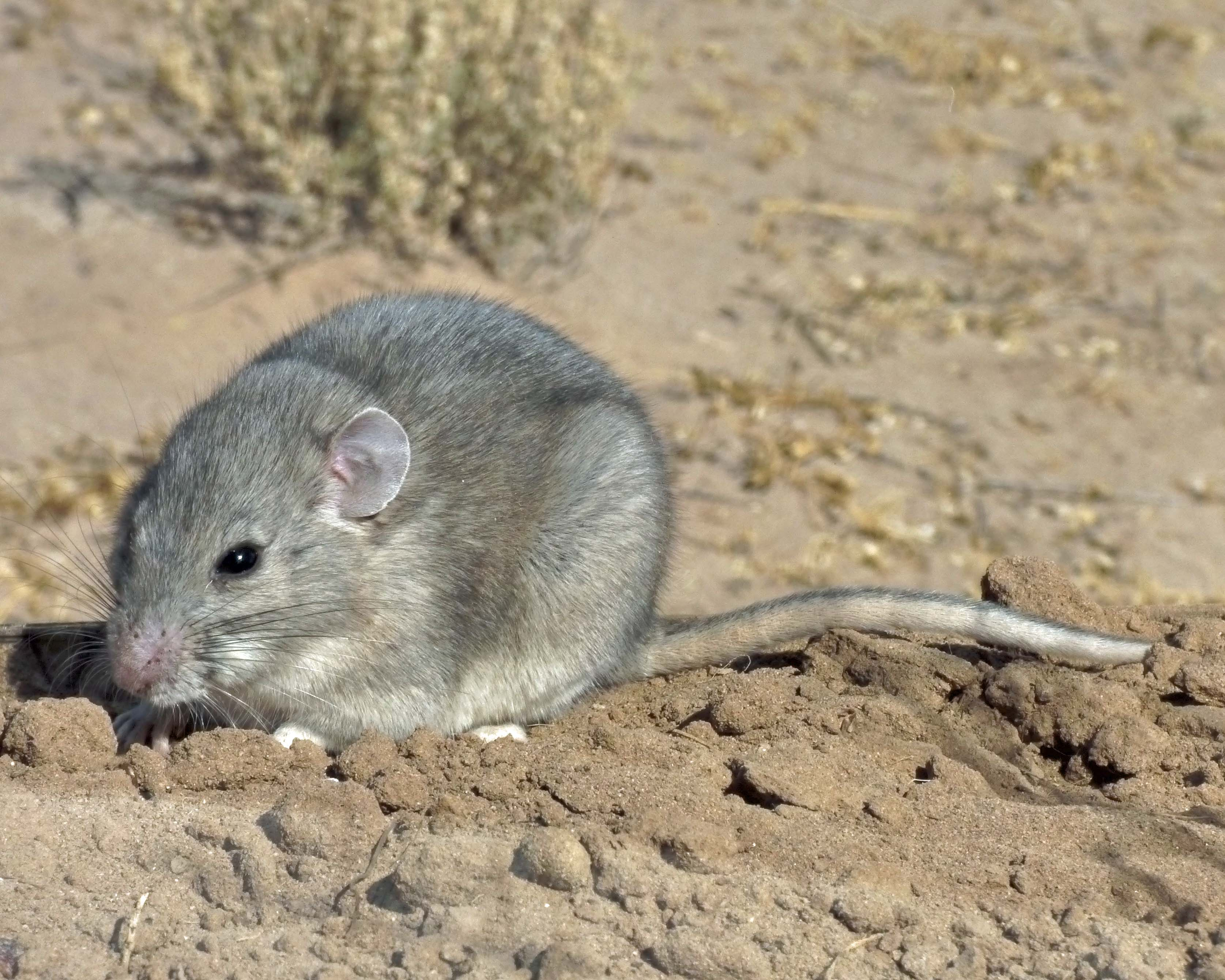
- Southern Plains Woodrat, Luna County

Conservation status
- Least Concern (IUCN 3.1)

Scientific classification
- Kingdom: Animalia
- Phylum: Chordata
- Class: Mammalia
- Order: Rodentia
- Family: Cricetidae
- Subfamily: Neotominae
- Genus: Neotoma
- Species: N. micropus

Binomial name
- Neotoma micropus Baird, 1855

= Southern Plains woodrat =

Species of rodent

The Southern Plains woodrat (Neotoma micropus) is a species of rodent in the family Cricetidae. It is found in northwest Mexico and in Colorado, Kansas, New Mexico, Oklahoma, and Texas in the United States. The subspecies Neotoma micropus leucophaea: White Sands woodrat, is white in coloration and found only at White Sands National Park in New Mexico.

== Habitat ==
N. micropus inhabits semi-arid brush-lands and rocky outcrops. It favors cactus, mesquite and thickets. Dens are constructed underneath shrubs and cacti, often prickly pears. They have a large central chamber that serve as the nest and side chambers around for storing food. The female of the species tends to use the same den throughout her adult life. Other organisms sometimes co-inhabit the dens with them, such as desert shrews and assassin bugs. The 'house' section is large and around 4–5 ft (1.2–1.5 m) high. It's composed of sticks, parts of cacti, thorns and other assorted debris.

== Description ==
The Southern Plains woodrat is vegetarian, feeding on the leaves of prickly pears, agave, sotol; and the seeds, pods and nuts of mesquite trees. They are often preyed on by hawks, owls, foxes, raccoons, coyotes, bobcats and snakes. Western diamondback rattlesnakes are especially fond of them.

== Reproduction ==
This woodrat bears litters of two to three. Gestation is around 30-39 days long. Northern populations breed in early spring, having one litter per year. Southern populations have a longer breeding season and more litters.
