= Neotoma insularis =

Conservation status
- Data Deficient (IUCN 3.1)

Scientific classification
- Kingdom: Animalia
- Phylum: Chordata
- Class: Mammalia
- Order: Rodentia
- Family: Cricetidae
- Subfamily: Neotominae
- Genus: Neotoma
- Species: N. insularis

Binomial name
- Neotoma insularis Townsend, 1912

Species of rodent

Neotoma insularis, the Angel de la Guarda woodrat, is a species of rodent in the family Cricetidae. It is found in the Mexican state of Baja California on Angel de la Guarda Island.

== Description ==
This species is described as being of medium body size with a relatively short tail.

== Classification ==
This species, initially described as such by Townsend in 1912, was listed as a subspecies of Neotoma lepida by Burt in 1932. Patton et al. (2008) revised the systematic position of Neotoma lepida and found it to be a species complex, with N. l. insularis being readily distinct from N. lepida, by means of mtDNA phylogeny and various morphological attributes, therefore reverting this population to its initial status as a species, as described by Townsend.
