= Nicaraguan woodrat =

Conservation status
- Least Concern (IUCN 3.1)

Scientific classification
- Kingdom: Animalia
- Phylum: Chordata
- Class: Mammalia
- Order: Rodentia
- Family: Cricetidae
- Subfamily: Neotominae
- Genus: Neotoma
- Species: N. chrysomelas

Binomial name
- Neotoma chrysomelas J. A. Allen, 1908

Species of rodent

The Nicaraguan woodrat (Neotoma chrysomelas) is a species of rodent in the family Cricetidae found in Honduras and Nicaragua.
