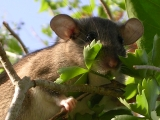
- An individual of the N. f. smalli subspecies

Conservation status
- Least Concern (IUCN 3.1)

Scientific classification
- Kingdom: Animalia
- Phylum: Chordata
- Class: Mammalia
- Order: Rodentia
- Family: Cricetidae
- Subfamily: Neotominae
- Genus: Neotoma
- Species: N. floridana

Binomial name
- Neotoma floridana (Ord, 1818)

Subspecies
- click to expand: N. f. attwateri Mearns, 1897; N. f. baileyi Merriam, 1894; N. f. campestris J. A. Allen, 1894; N. f. haematoreia A. H. Howell, 1934; N. f. illinoensis A. H. Howell, 1910; N. f. osagensis Blair, 1939; N. f. rubida Bangs, 1898; N. f. smalli Sherman, 1955

= Eastern woodrat =

Species of rodent

The eastern woodrat (Neotoma floridana), also known as the Florida woodrat or bush rat, is a pack rat native to the central and Eastern United States. It constructs large dens that may serve as nests for many generations and stores food in outlying caches for the winter. While widespread and not uncommon, it has declined or disappeared in several areas.

== Taxonomy ==
Eight subspecies of the eastern woodrat are currently recognized: N. f. illinoensis, N. f. floridana (the nominate), N. f. smalli, N. f. baileyi, N. f. pennsylvanica, N. f. attwateri, N. f. osagensis, and N. f. rubida. Of these, the Key Largo woodrat (N. f. smalli) is classified as endangered by the IUCN. The Allegheny woodrat (N. magister) was previously considered a subspecies but was elevated to species status based on comparative mitochondrial DNA analyses. Subspecies are thought to be descended from one species living along the Appalachian Plateau, which subsequently spread out through the Coastal Plain.

== Description ==
The eastern woodrat is a rodent of medium size, with an average length of 21.2 centimetres (8.3 in) and weight of 245 grams (0.540 lb), but grows up to 17 inches (43 cm) long. The body is short and stocky and the tail is exceptionally long (15–20 centimetres (5.9–7.9 in)). It is covered in a soft, gray-brown pelage, which is darker dorsally. Belly and feet are white. Sexes are alike, but males tend to be slightly larger.

== Distribution and habitat ==
=== Distribution ===
The distribution for the eastern woodrat stretches across the Southeastern and Midwestern United States. They are located as far south as the Tennessee River and Central Florida. The more central areas they are found are Kentucky and Tennessee. Northern locations include Kansas, central Missouri, and southern Illinois. They can also be found along the Appalachian Mountains that range all the way to New York. They're also in some western locations and Piedmont areas of Maryland. They can be seen in places like woodlands, prairies, mountains, swamps, and lowland hardwood forests as far west as Colorado. The more disjunctive population occurrence is in Nebraska and Key Largo, Florida. Woodrats are usually found in marshes, coastal plains, and grasslands. The eastern woodrat's habitat ranges latitudinally from central Florida to southeastern New York, and longitudinally from Connecticut to eastern Colorado. Reintroduction to north-eastern states, such as Illinois, have occurred in the 2010s.

With a wide range but low population density, this species is considered uncommon. The overall population has been decreasing since 1982. The primary cause for this decline in the southeastern United States has been habitat destruction due to human development of the coastal plains.

The species has been recovered as a fossil from late Pleistocene deposits in southeastern New Mexico, several hundred miles southwest of its nearest current range.

The species does not hibernate, even in the northern extremes of its range.

=== Habitat ===
The species inhabits wooded areas, swamps and hedges, with a variety of different habitat preferences reported for the recognized geographic subspecies. Nests can be located in and around rocky bluffs, upland woods, swamps and hammocks, dry scrub pine, grasslands, abandoned buildings, marshes, and refuse piles. In Texas they are mostly found around brush piles, in Kansas they are often found around hilltop limestone, the base of trees, standing hollow trees, and under root tangles along gullies. They are recently found in Florida around willow trees. The eastern woodrat likes the ability to cover and get away from predators quickly.

The nest can be constructed from a variety of different materials, such as sticks and branches, rocks, dry dung, tin cans, glass shards, and lined with dry grass, crushed bark, bird feathers, and even rotting wood, acorn fragments, and loose soil. These items are either picked up in the mouth or dragged, depending on the size of the item.

Even though there is only one visible entrance, woodrat nests have multiple escape routes. Each 'house' contains up to 2 nests, but usually only one woodrat will be found in each home. Houses can be up to 4 metres (13 ft) in length, 2 metres (6.6 ft) in width, and more than 1 metre (3.3 ft) in height. The shape depends on the location and may be pyramidal, conical, or domed (if sufficient structural support is present). Nests may be found up to 8 metres (26 ft) above ground in trees or vines, but normally are located at ground level. Houses are efficient shelters from temperature fluctuations and rain.

Individuals are known to stay in one location for their entire lives, with multiple generations inhabiting the same nest. Unoccupied nests are frequently taken over by other animals, including rabbits, mice, snakes, amphibians, and various invertebrates.

Eastern woodrats are typically solitary creatures, so they usually have a buffer between territories. The females have a smaller territory than males, averaging around 0.17 hectares (0.42 acres). Males average around 0.26 hectares (0.64 acres) and the species-wide average territory area is 662 square metres (7,130 ft^{2}). Being solitary, the rats tend not to stray much farther than 21 metres (69 ft) from their nests unless sexually active or for a preferred food.

== Ecology ==
=== Foraging ===
As with most members of the genus, the Eastern woodrat feeds opportunistically on nuts, seeds, fungi, buds, stems, roots, foliage, and fruits. While the eastern woodrat's nest is typically found on the ground, it is a capable climber and may forage above ground. Eastern woodrats eat about 5% of their body weight in dry mass each day. During the summer months, most feeding is done while foraging. Only small amounts of food are taken back to the den for daytime feeding. Woodrats do not change significantly in weight from autumn to spring. Weight of individual woodrats is not correlated to the kilocalories in their caches.

Eastern woodrats are known for their foraging and caching habits. When searching for food is dangerous or unproductive, animals often use food stores to supply all or part of their diet. This is a feasible strategy to avoid food shortage. It is the habit of collecting and storing both food and nonfood items that has earned the eastern woodrat is other common name of "pack-rat" or "trade rat". Starting in September, the woodrat will start to forage and store food in its midden for use and survival in the winter. Although caches do not serve as the sole source of winter food, caches examined yielded as much as 1 imperial bushel (36 L) of plant material.

Woodrats have great adaptability in their feeding habits. They feed on almost any kind of plant material including leaves, roots and tubers, wood, bark, stems, and seeds. Although the Eastern Woodrats eat mostly green vegetation, they also eat various types of fruits, nuts, fungi, ferns, and seeds. Food preferences vary between individuals, populations and geographic areas. In Texas, pecan nuts are a major food source; in Tennessee, mint and beechnuts were found to be the most cached item; in Pennsylvania, mushrooms were one of the top food items. Acorns are a major food source for all woodrat populations, as oak trees are found throughout its range and acorns can be stored for a long time. Energy and perishability influence the woodrat's diet and caching. The value of food when consumed should equal or exceed the cost of gathering and storage. Food is chosen by dryness and degree of microbial infection. Woodrats tend to eat perishable food and cache less perishable foods, thus reducing the risk of loss to spoilage.

Decomposition of food stores appears to be a constant challenge. Woodrats seem to exhibit physiological adaptions that allow them to consume food inhabited by fungi. Fungi can increase nutritional value of some foods by making nutrients within food more accessible by breaking down complex carbohydrates, which woodrats may exploit.

Although eastern woodrats are herbivores, evidence suggests that the species will take meat if given the opportunity. Snakes, salamanders, mice, and quail have all been found in stomachs of woodrats. Gnawed bones have been found in caches, probably used for sharpening teeth and for their mineral contents. Only anecdotal evidence exists concerning woodrat carnivory. However, woodrats will cache carrion if given the chance.

Drinking water is typically not needed. woodrats get the water they need from dew, water-containing plants such as succulents, and fruit, and can survive droughts with these water sources alone.

=== Reproduction and lifecycle ===
Eastern woodrats are aggressive towards conspecifics. Older individuals will chase and fight younger woodrats. The species only becomes sociable during breeding season.

The breeding season of eastern wood rats depends on the climate. Those in warmer climates (e.g. Florida and Georgia) can reproduce all year, while eastern wood rats in higher latitudes (e.g. Kansas and Nebraska) breed from early spring to mid fall. Their estrous cycle lasts between 3 and 8 days, while gestation lasts between 32 and 38 days. One to six young are born in each litter, and the female may become pregnant again after a week. Females can have up to three litters in a year, with two being normal. They can also sometimes reproduce in their first year, as they reach sexual maturity before males. Females are solely responsible for the young. Females and males fight when they come across each other. If the male wins, copulation occurs, but if the female wins, the male is usually killed during fighting.

Pups are born with closed eyes, limited amount of hair and immediately attached to the teat. Most of the pelage will have appeared by day 8. On the 15th day their hair is fully grown and their eyes are wide open. The young wean for 3–4 weeks and become independent after 70–90 days. Juveniles continue growing until they are about 8 months old. The females start mating as young as 5 months.

In captivity the eastern woodrat has been recorded to live for up to 8.6 years, however the average lifespan in the wild is 3 years. The majority of deaths occur within their first year of life. One field study in Kansas tracked 27 individuals, of which six survived to adulthood and only three lived long enough to reproduce.

=== Predators and parasites ===
Eastern woodrats are a common prey item for many predators. Most common predators are the great horned owl, spotted skunk, long-tailed weasel, red fox, raccoon, and the timber rattlesnake, along with other various snakes. Woodrats try to avoid predators by being mostly active at night and hiding in their large dens during daylight. Unweaned pups in dens in particular are commonly taken by snakes.

One of the most common parasites of eastern woodrats are botfly larvae. Adult botflies lay their eggs outside the entrance of the woodrat's den. They then attach themselves to the woodrat's fur when it passes through entrance. Once the eggs hatch, the botfly larvae penetrate the skin and lodge in the woodrat's neck, chest, and abdomen until pupation. The resulting cyst can be 15 mm in diameter but does not seem to cause any obvious discomfort. Botflies infest approximately 16% of the eastern woodrat population.

Raccoons may carry raccoon roundworms, an intestinal parasite. Woodrats may ingest the eggs of the roundworm while foraging at raccoon latrine areas. Larvae migrate to the brain, causing a lack of energy, loss of muscle control, and eventually death. The roundworm is a known mortality factor in woodrats in Indiana, New York, New Jersey, and Pennsylvania, with infection rates of around 75%.

== Ecological role ==
Eastern woodrat nests provide homes for a number of other species including, but not limited to, other rodents, insects, reptiles, and frogs. Seed dispersal by caching and transporting seeds into dens has a great impact on the spread and maintenance of forest ecosystems, and woodrat fecal matter increases soil fertility. The study of feces from prehistoric woodrat middens has been of great use in archaeological and paleontological research by providing indications about changing floral regimes.

== Interaction with humans ==
Eastern woodrats are popularly known for being pests. They tend to seek out houses, especially cottages or cabins in wooded areas, for warmth or housing, and do not hesitate to make nests out of mattresses and other furniture while feeding in adjacent cultivated areas. Automobiles may be damaged by chewing on wires and the introduction of nesting materials. Rarely, eastern woodrats may be the carriers of diseases that are communicable to humans. The eastern woodrat does not have any economic impact on humans, but may receive blame for damages made by black or Norway rats.

== Conservation ==
Most subspecies of the eastern woodrat have been classified as Least Concern by the IUCN, with the exception of the Key Largo woodrat. While the species appears to never have been abundant, it remains widespread and reasonably common. However, at smaller scales, the species has been listed as endangered, threatened, or of special concern in 5 of the 17 states in which they are found. State status designations may not be accurate since there is little research done where woodrats are presumed to be common. All states with recorded population decline are on the edge of the species range. The only conservation action taken has been habitat protection in Indiana, Illinois, North Carolina, and Florida.

=== Threats ===
Where eastern woodrats have declined, a variety of possible causes has been identified. Based on the historical records, it appears that extremely cold winters can cause a dramatic decline in populations. In 1912 and 1918, severe winters reduced the Illinois eastern woodrat populations. In 1948 and 1949, long winters with accumulation of snow and ice might have caused high mortality of litters in Kansas and starvation of adults.

In recent times, urban development is thought to have had an impact. In South Carolina, massive development and urbanization, including forest clearance and road expansion, have led to habitat loss and isolation of woodrat populations. Suitable habitats in the Coastal Plains of South Carolina are not protected at all.

While woodrats forage on many different food items, they are largely depended on cached acorns and nuts during winter. Eruptions of the gypsy moth in the basin of the Lower Mississippi River in 1964 and 1965 resulted in poor acorn and chestnut crops and subsequently in increased mortality in eastern woodrats in the area.

The continued spread of raccoons may increase the likelihood of lethal infection of woodrats with the raccoon roundworm.

=== Conservation management ===
In 2003, The Fish and Wildlife Service and Florida department of Environmental Protection jointly initiated a program for the removal of feral and free-roaming cats from conservation areas occupied by woodrats, which has proven largely successful. Another step towards preserving this species is the separation of human activities from woodrat habitats to reduce human disturbance and secondary effects such as the presence of raccoons.

The species has been reintroduced in several areas including Pine Hills, Union County and some sites in Missouri. Reintroduction areas need to be checked for adequate food supplies, shelter resources and absence of raccoon roundworm. It has been suggested that the sex ratio be skewed toward females because eastern woodrats are polygynous, and that a genetically diverse stock be used to improve adaptability and survival rates.
