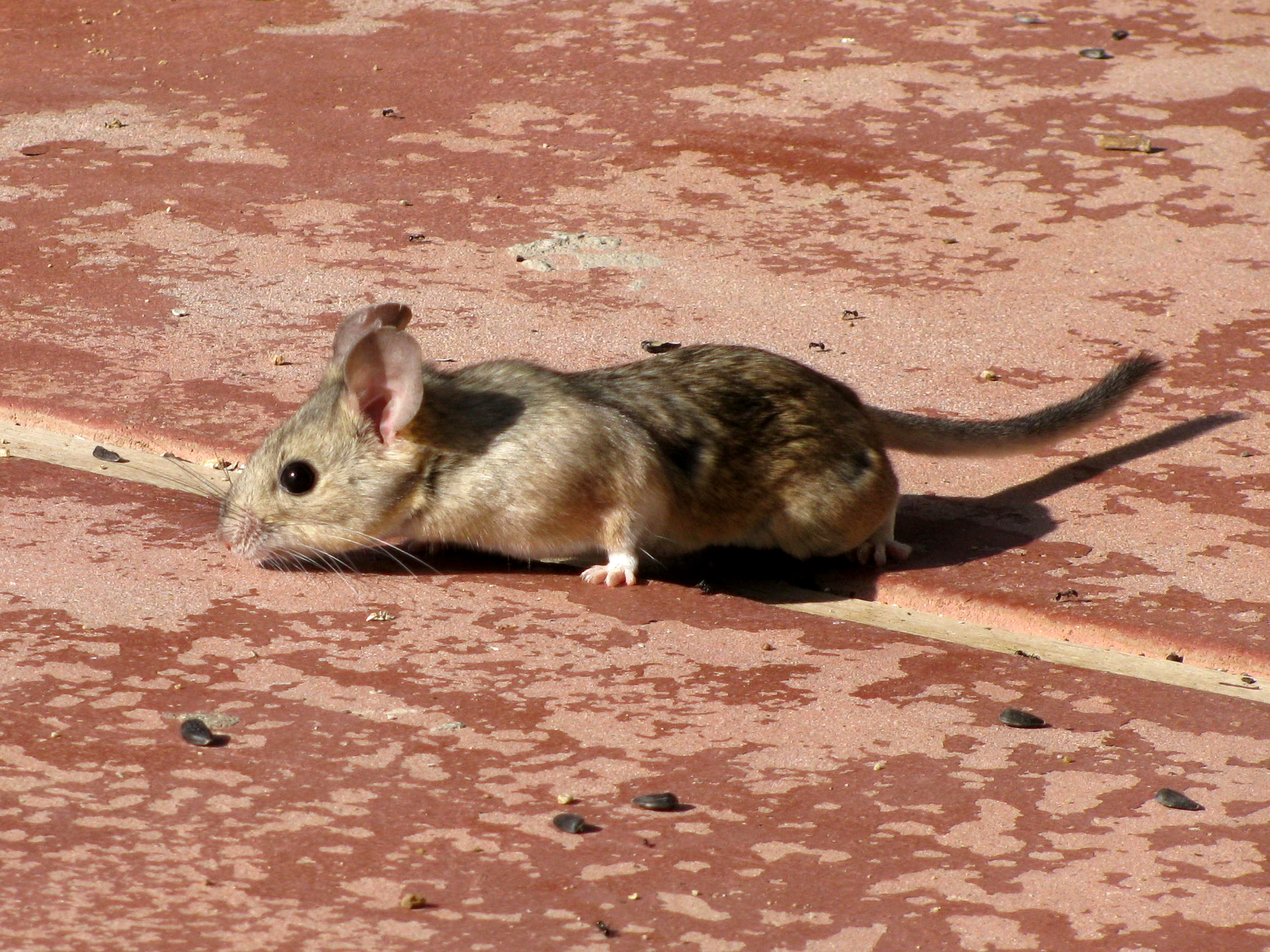

Conservation status
- Least Concern (IUCN 3.1)

- Secure (NatureServe)

Scientific classification
- Kingdom: Animalia
- Phylum: Chordata
- Class: Mammalia
- Order: Rodentia
- Family: Cricetidae
- Subfamily: Neotominae
- Genus: Neotoma
- Species: N. lepida

Binomial name
- Neotoma lepida Thomas, 1893

= Desert woodrat =

Species of rodent

The desert woodrat (Neotoma lepida) is a species of pack rat native to desert regions of western North America.

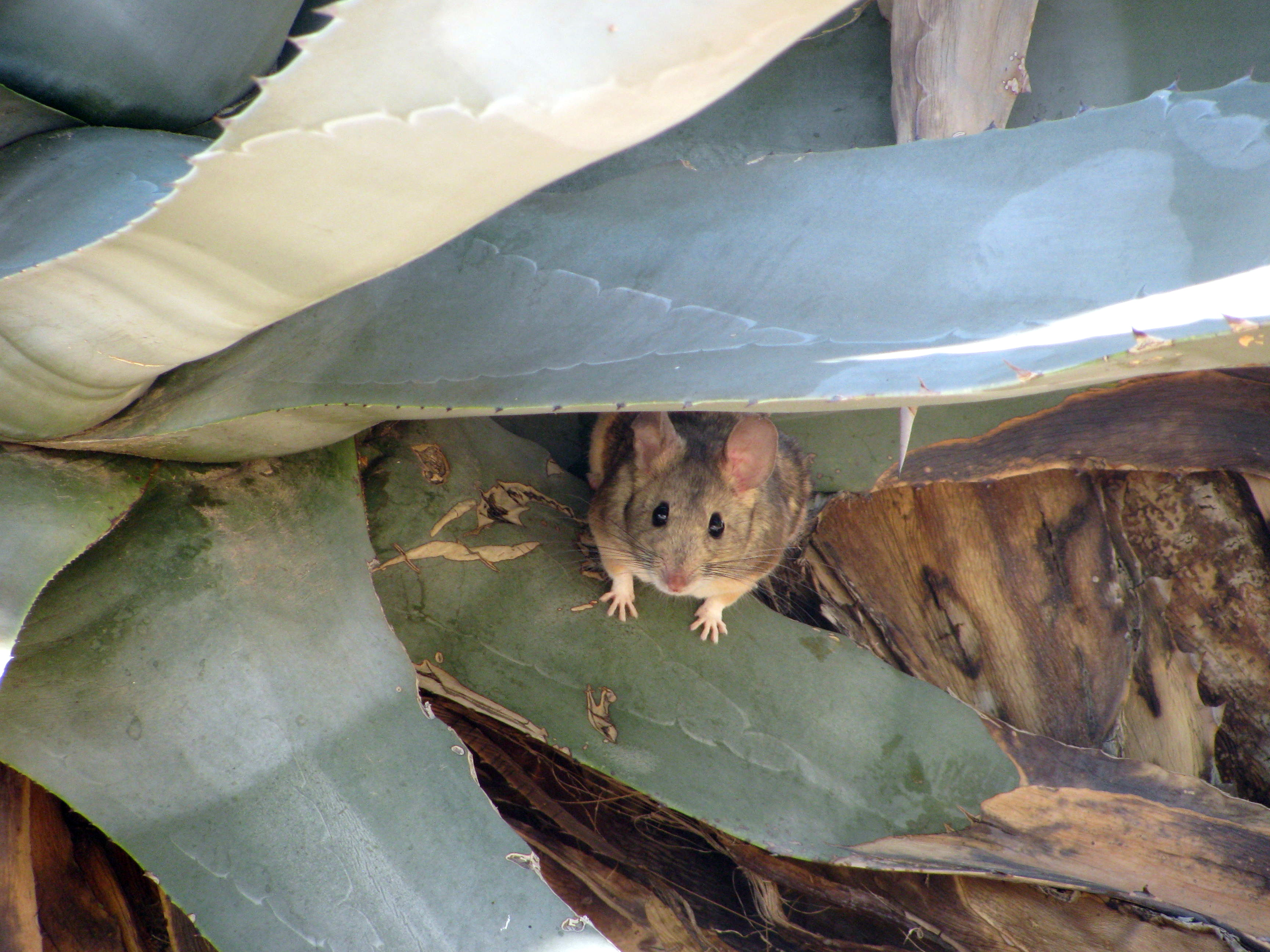
Desert woodrat in a century plant

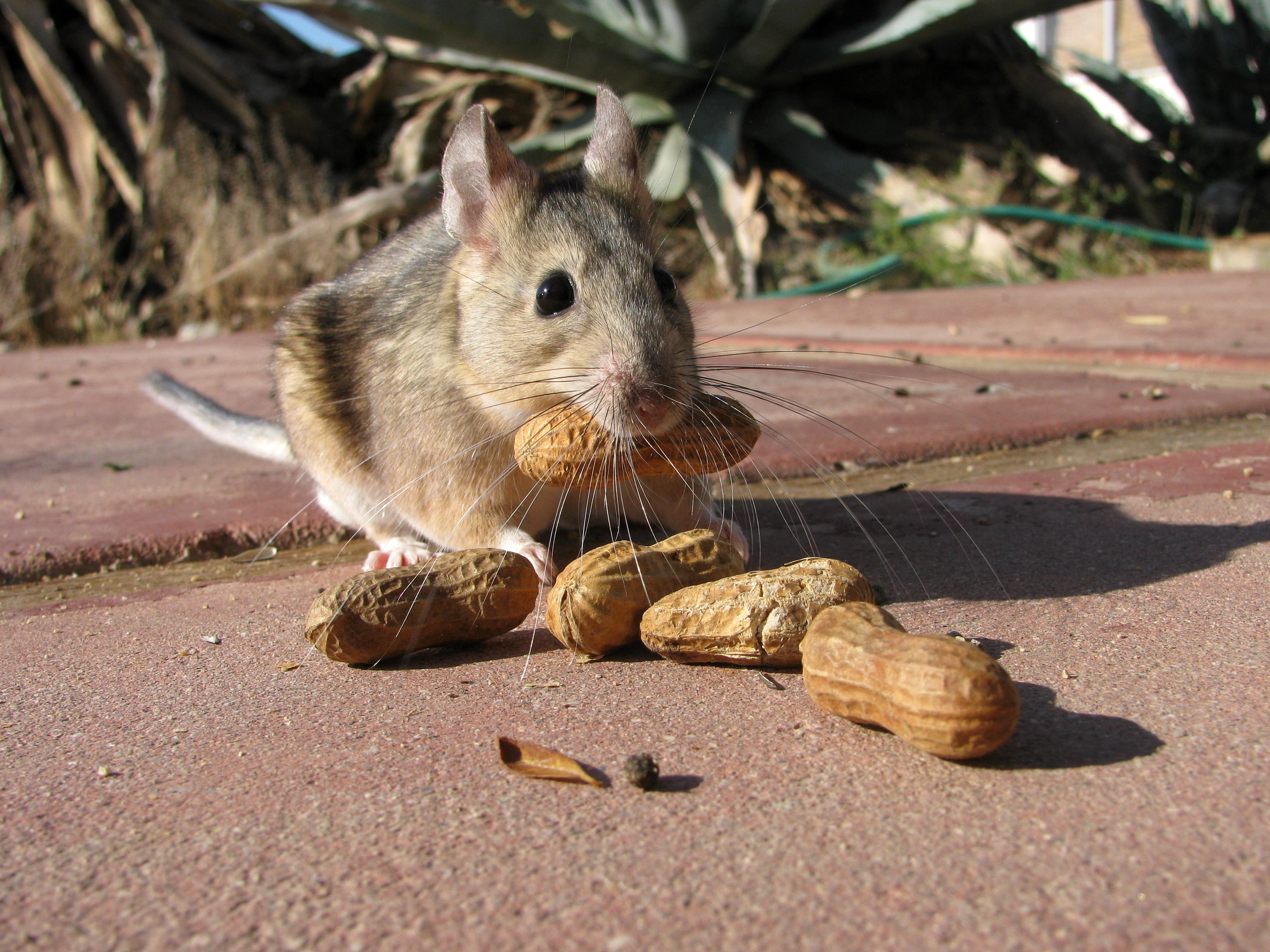
Desert woodrat eating a peanut

== Description ==
Desert woodrats are relatively small for pack rats, measuring 28 to 39 cm (11 to 15 in) in length, including a 12 to 20 cm (4.7 to 7.9 in) tail. They weigh from 122 to 350 g (4.3 to 12.3 oz), with males being larger than females. Their coloring varies between individuals, and can be anything from pale gray to cinnamon to near-black. Regardless of the color on the rest of the body, however, the animal's underparts and feet are always white, while the otherwise pale fur on the throat region is gray at its base. The tail is distinctly bicolored, and has more hair, and fewer visible scales, than the tails of brown rats. Desert woodrats have a narrow snout, long whiskers, and relatively long ears that are almost the length of the hind feet.

== Distribution and habitat ==
Desert woodrats range from southeastern Oregon and southwestern Idaho, south through Nevada and western Utah to California in the US, and Baja California and extreme northwestern Sonora in Mexico. They are generally found in sagebrush scrub areas, in chaparral, and in deserts and rocky slopes with scattered cactus, yucca, pine/juniper, and other low vegetation, at elevations up to 2,900 m (9,500 ft). They are most abundant in rocky areas with numerous crevices or rock piles in which they can seek shelter from predators.

Twenty three subspecies were recognised, many of them restricted to small islands in the Gulf of California. However, Neotoma insularis (Townsend, 1912), is now recognized to be distinct from N. lepida following the ASM and IUCN assessments.

== Biology ==
They feed on beans and leaves of mesquite, on juniper, and on parts of available cacti, apparently without getting injured by the spines. They also eat creosote bushes, thistles, Ephedra, Mustard plants, sagebrush, and buckwheat. They will also eat other green vegetation, seeds, fruits, acorns, and pine nuts. In desert habitats, they are highly dependent upon prickly pear cacti for water balance, although they can be sustained on creosote year-round. Although they are capable of eating food containing high levels of resins and oxalic acid, such as the leaves of creosote bushes, these affect their water balance and limit their ability to eat other foods, limiting the growth of the woodrats' population in areas where such plants are common.

Predators include snakes, owls, hawks, coyotes, foxes, weasels, and other carnivorous mammals. They are also commonly parasitized by bot fly larvae.

Desert woodrats breed in the spring and summer, and give birth to litters of up to five young after a gestation period of 30 to 36 days. The young weigh about 10 g (0.35 oz) at birth, and are blind, with only the tips of their hairs visible. Their eyes open after about ten days. The teeth of newborn desert woodrats are initially splayed apart, creating a hexagonal opening between them, with which they clamp themselves to their mother's teats so firmly that they are difficult to separate. The teeth achieve their normal shape after about twelve days, but the young are not completely weaned until around four weeks of age. They live up to five years in captivity.

== Behavior ==
Desert woodrats are primarily nocturnal and are aggressively solitary. They may defend water sources, such as succulent plants, against other species, and perhaps prevent other species from obtaining water during droughts.

Desert woodrats sometimes appropriate the burrows of ground squirrels or kangaroo rats, and will fortify the entrance with several cubic metres of sticks and joints collected from jumping and teddy-bear chollas. This provides a formidable defense against predators. Living quarters are also often built against rock crevices, at the base of creosote or cactus plants, or in the lower branches of trees. Rock crevices appear preferred where available, but pack rats generally adapt to any situation.

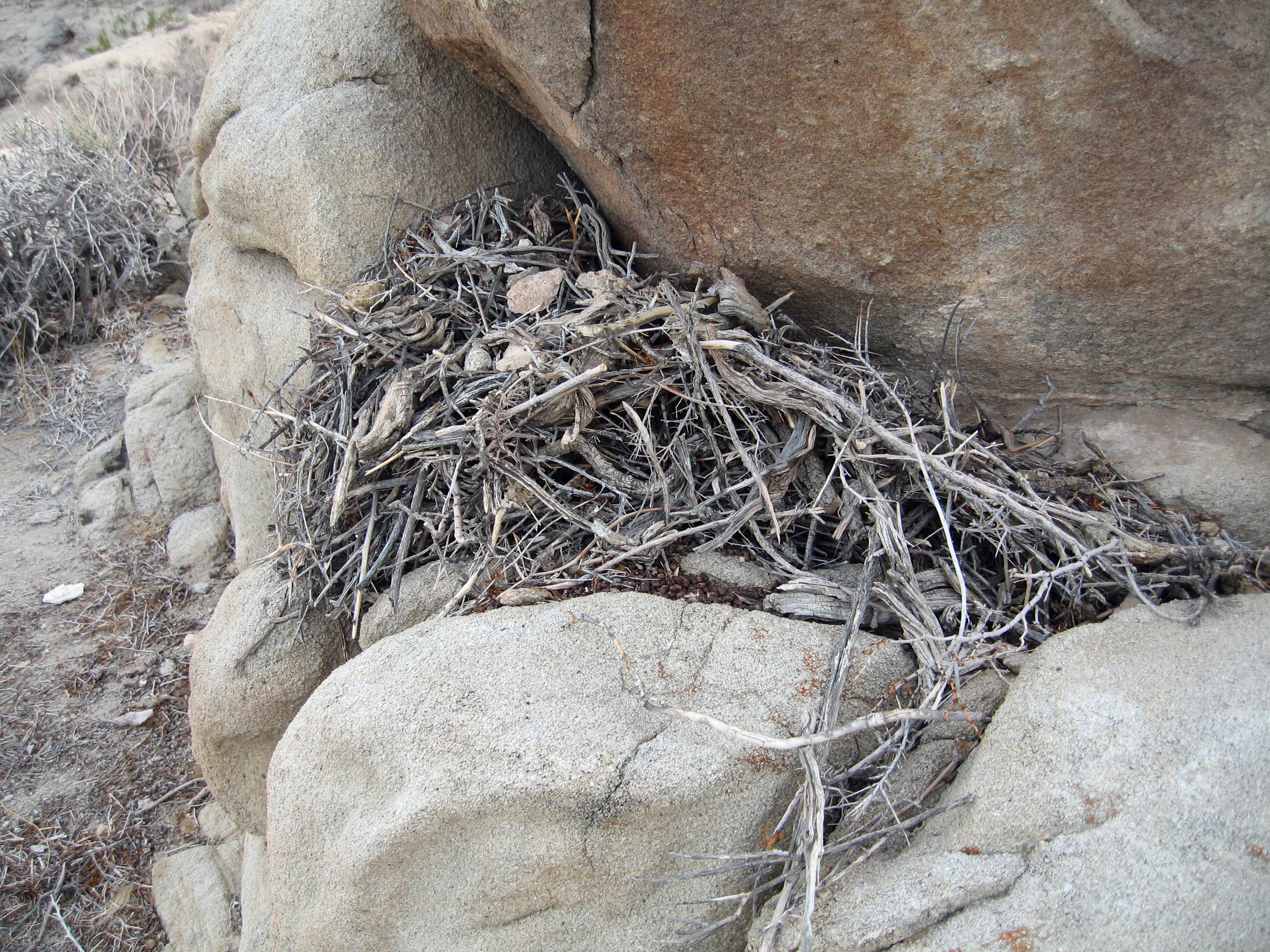
Wood rat (Neotoma lepida) midden

Woodrats construct houses for nesting, food caching, and predator escape. These can have up to six entrances and eight internal chambers, including both nests and food caches. Houses 36 cm (14 in) high and around 100 cm (39 in) across at the base are not unusual. Nests are constructed of dried vegetation, usually fibrous grass parts or shredded stems.

Males mark their territory by rubbing themselves on the ground, depositing musky sebum secreted by large sebaceous glands on their abdomen. Females, however, scent mark by first digging, and then rubbing their flanks, legs or cheeks on the excavated soil. They are active year-round.
