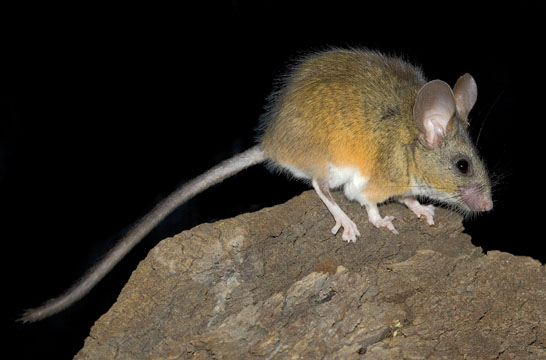

Conservation status
- Least Concern (IUCN 3.1)

- Secure (NatureServe)

Scientific classification
- Kingdom: Animalia
- Phylum: Chordata
- Class: Mammalia
- Infraclass: Placentalia
- Order: Rodentia
- Family: Cricetidae
- Subfamily: Neotominae
- Genus: Peromyscus
- Species: P. californicus

Binomial name
- Peromyscus californicus (Gambel, 1848)
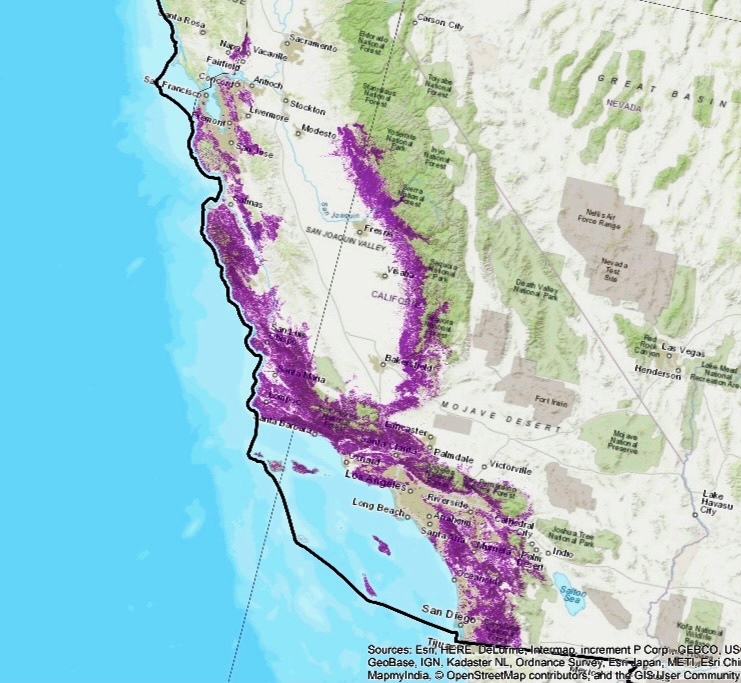
- range in California, United States

= California deermouse =

Species of rodent

The California deermouse or California mouse (Peromyscus californicus) is a species of rodent in the subfamily Neotominae in the family Cricetidae. It is a species of the genus Peromyscus, a closely related group of New World mice often called "deermice", and the only in the Peromyscus californicus species group. It is found in northwestern Mexico and central to southern California. It is the largest Peromyscus species in the United States.

While most rodents are polygamous, the California deermouse is monogamous and forms pair bonds, making it a model organism for researchers studying the genetics and neurobiology of partner fidelity and paternal care.

== Description ==
The California deermouse has very large ears, and its tail is longer than the head and body combined. Including the tail, which is about 117 to 156 mm (4.6 to 6.1 in) long, the mouse ranges in length from 220 to 285 mm (8.7 to 11.2 in). The coat is overall orange, mixed with black and brown hairs. This dorsal colour shades to a creamy-white belly colour. The manus and feet are white. Adults are large enough that they can be confused with juvenile Neotoma fuscipes, a close relative in the subfamily Neotominae. The dental formula is 1003/1003.

== Breeding ==
The California deermouse is semiarboreal, but tends to nest on the ground, under debris such as fallen logs, and they will also move into Neotoma fuscipes nests as seasonal residents. Nests are insulated with coarse, dry grasses, weeds, and sticks, and fine grass is used as bedding in the center chamber. The California mouse forms pair bonds and the males help raise the young. A litter usually consists of only two pups, but a pair may produce as many as six litters in a year. Gestation ranges from 21 to 25 days. Weaning occurs when the offspring are five to six weeks of age.

== Behavior ==
P. californicus is more strongly territorial than P. maniculatus, with both sexes defending the nest site. Males are also aggressive toward one another; their fighting techniques involve jumping, avoidance, and a characteristic mewing cry. This male aggression often is a trade-off between parental care, for males that spend more time engaging in territorial aggression consequently spend less time providing food for offspring. The mouse communicates with other members of its species via ultrasound. The manner in which a male and female communicate changes from a more aggressive style to a more affiliative style during the development of a pair bond, and the characteristics of their vocalizations can be used to predict the stability of the pair bond. California mice are mostly active at night.

== Diet ==
The mouse's diet consists of shrub fruits, seeds, and flowers, such as of Rhus integrifolia, Lotus scoparius, and Salvia apiana. They favor the seeds of bay laurel (ca) and also consume grasses, forbs, fungi, and arthropods.

== Predators ==
Their main predators are weasels and barn owls.
