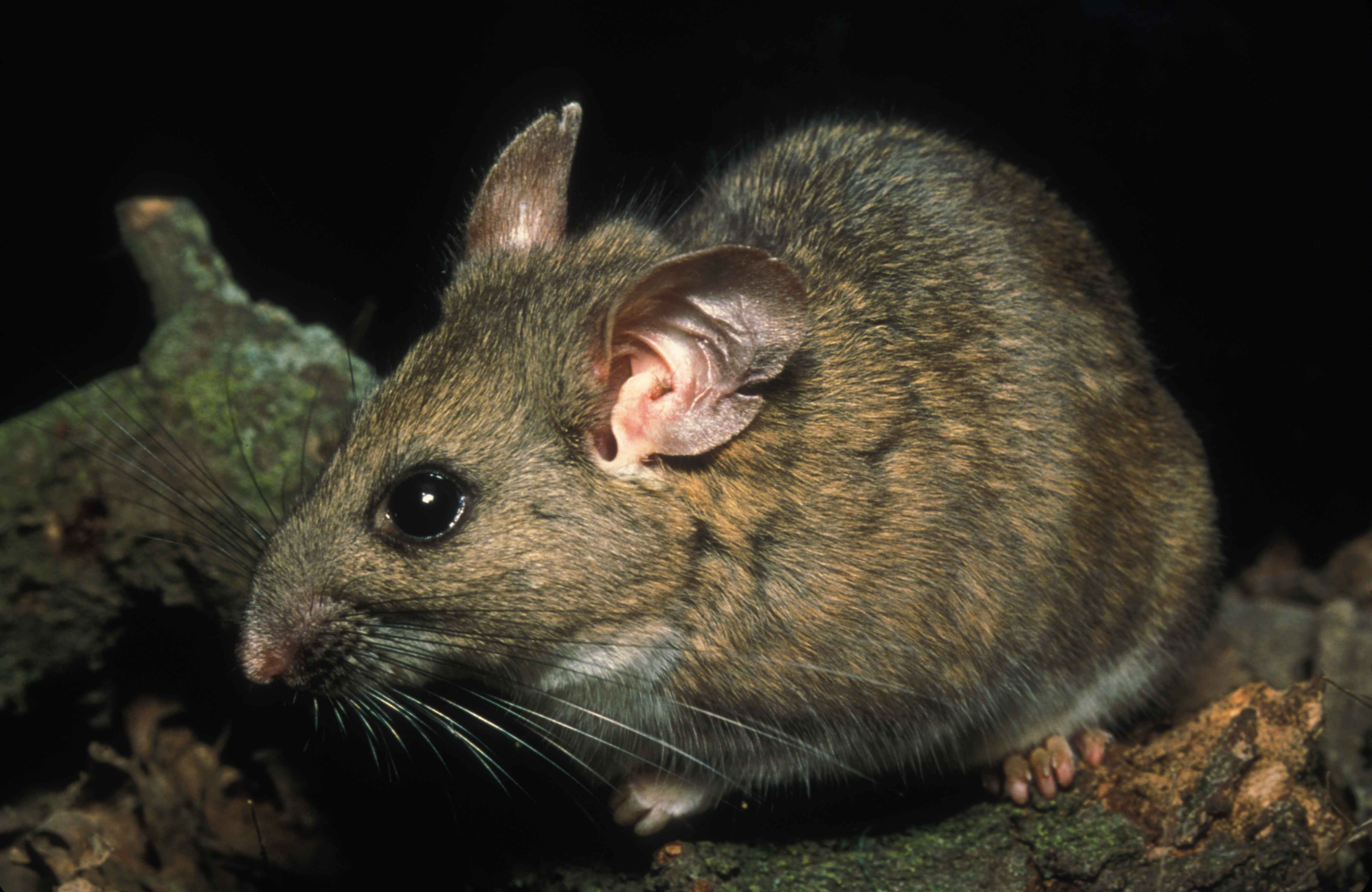

Conservation status
- Least Concern (IUCN 3.1)

Scientific classification
- Kingdom: Animalia
- Phylum: Chordata
- Class: Mammalia
- Order: Rodentia
- Family: Cricetidae
- Subfamily: Neotominae
- Genus: Neotoma
- Species: N. fuscipes

Binomial name
- Neotoma fuscipes Baird, 1858

= Dusky-footed woodrat =

Species of rodent

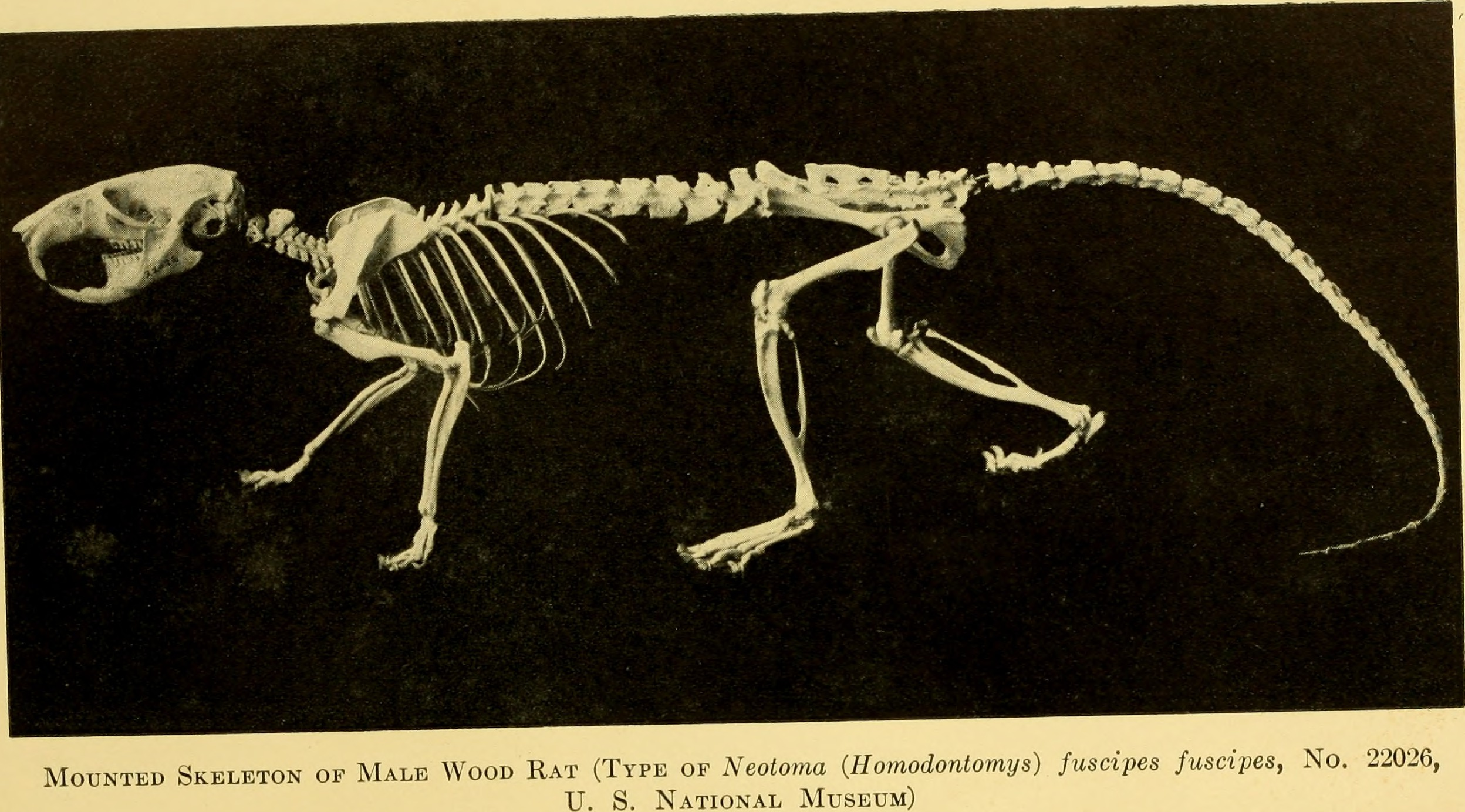
Skeleton of a male N. fuscipes

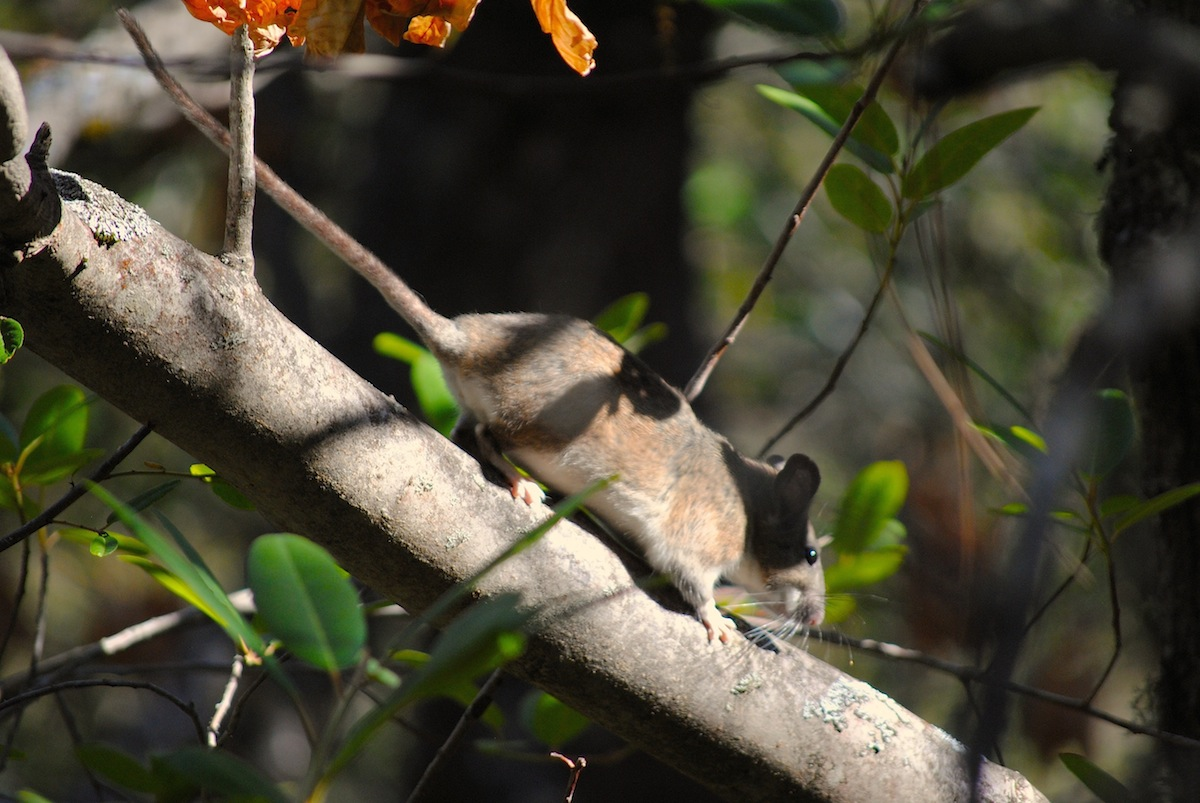
Adult female N. fuscipes, UC Davis Quail Ridge Reserve

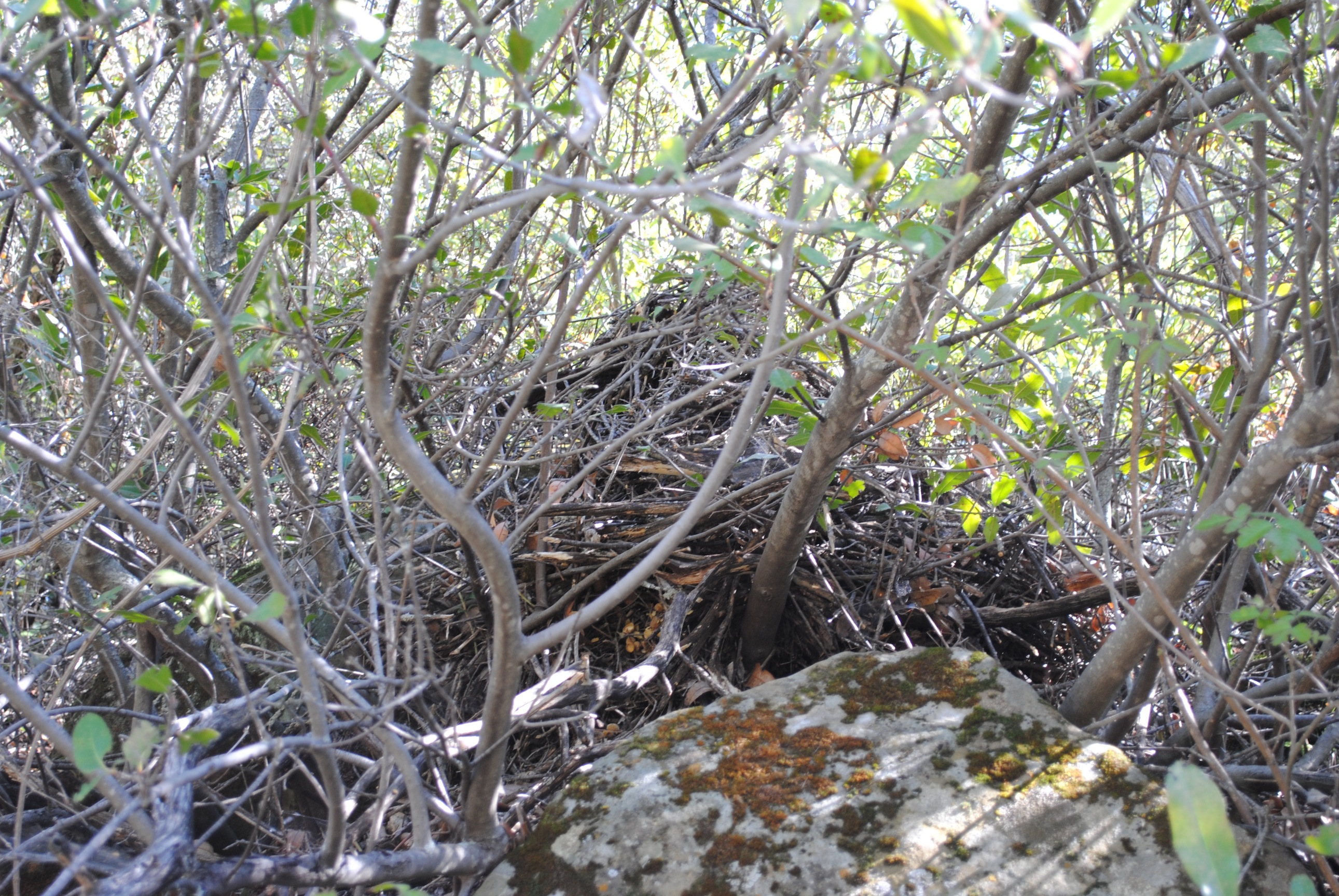
N. fuscipes midden, UC Davis Stebbins Cold Canyon Reserve, CA

The dusky-footed woodrat (Neotoma fuscipes) is a species of nocturnal rodent in the family Cricetidae. Nicknames include "packrats" or "trade rats" because of their tendency to hoard things, build large domed dens, and "trade" by dropping then picking up another object for it. Coyotes and other predators will attempt to prey on these rodents by laying waste to the dens, but the sheer volume of material is usually dissuasive. Occasionally, dusky-footed woodrats will build satellite dens in trees. Although these animals are solitary, except in the mating season (when they are most vulnerable to predation), dens are frequently found in clusters of up to several dozen, forming rough "communities". The mating system in this species appears to be variable, with promiscuity most generally at high population densities and monogamy at lower densities.

They are similar in appearance to the common rat species Rattus rattus and Rattus norvegicus, but with larger ears and eyes, softer coats, and furred tails. The California mouse, Peromyscus californicus, which has similar distribution, is sometimes found living in woodrat dens. Dens contain a nest and one or more "pantry" chambers which are used to store leaves and nuts for future consumption. The dental formula of Neotoma fuscipes is 1.0.0.31.0.0.3 × 2 = 16.

== Distribution and habitat ==
The species is found in Mexico and the United States. Woodrats are found from Oregon into the northern part of Baja California. They are found along the Pacific coast, west of the deserts and Great Basin. Woodrats can be found near streams and in juniper and mixed coniferous forests. They prefer living in chaparral areas with dense ground cover because these areas offer a steady food supply and protection from predators, as well as an abundance of materials to build houses. In northeastern California, woodrats can survive in lava rims and beds with enough vegetation cover.

== Diet ==
Dusky-footed woodrats are chiefly herbivorous, but will eat insects, especially mealworms and crickets if offered. Their main diet consists of cuttings from branches, inner bark, fungi, leaves, seeds, greens, fruits, and nuts. Woodrats store food cuttings in their nests; with nests averaging 4.5 species of herbivorous vegetation, though they tend to have a dominant food source making up the majority of cuttings, oak (Quercus) is preferred if available. While most woodrats are habitat generalists, eating many varieties of plants, there is evidence of local specialization in diets. For example, significant differences have been observed in the diets of woodrats living only one kilometer apart, with one group living in juniper forest showing a preference for western juniper and the other, in mixed coniferous forest, subsisting largely on incense cedar.

== Predators ==
Woodrats are prey items of owls, coyotes, hawks, weasels, skunks, snakes, and cats. These predators, along with humans, keep woodrat populations under control.

If a predator attacks a woodrat's nest, the woodrat may take shelter in another nearby nest. Dusky-footed woodrats create a rattling sound by shaking their tails on the ground, all to alert each other of nearby predators and give a warning sign to predators themselves. The tail too can be used to initiate a fight with another woodrat.

== Behavior ==
=== Nesting ===
Woodrats build extensive nests in trees, on the ground, and on bluffs with dense vegetation or rock cover. The conical shaped nests can be two to eight feet tall and are made of sticks, bark, and various plant matter. One nest can house successive generations of woodrats, with offspring adding to nests making them larger. The nests can have many rooms used for food storage, resting, nurseries, and protection. Nests can be built in harsh, inaccessible places such as thorny brush or poison oak patches. One study suggests that dusky-footed woodrats of California have been found to selectively place California bay leaves (Umbellularia) around the edges of their nest within their middens to control levels of ectoparasites such as fleas. The leaves contain volatile organic compounds which are toxic to flea larvae. Among the terpenes most toxic to flea larvae in the bay leaves are umbellulone, cineole, and cymene. Wood rats are believed to have evolved this behavioral adaptation to cope with the environmental stresses posed by ectoparasites.

One study finds that a woodrat's maternal nest is an integral part of its nesting habits. When their mother moves nests, woodrats that remain in the maternal nest have a better chance of surviving than woodrats that follow their mother to her new nest. Woodrats move to the nearest viable, empty nest to their maternal nest, settling permanently after at least two moves. They often return to the maternal nest to visit.
