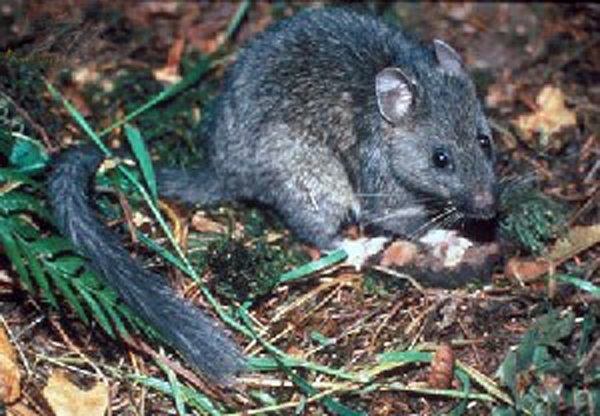
- Bushy-tailed woodrat (Neotoma cinerea)

Scientific classification
- Kingdom: Animalia
- Phylum: Chordata
- Class: Mammalia
- Infraclass: Placentalia
- Order: Rodentia
- Family: Cricetidae
- Subfamily: Neotominae
- Tribe: Neotomini
- Genus: Neotoma; Say & Ord, 1825

Type species
- Mus floridana Ord, 1818

Species
- Neotoma albigula Neotoma angustapalata Neotoma chrysomelas Neotoma cinerea Neotoma devia Neotoma ferruginea †Neotoma findleyi Neotoma floridana Neotoma fuscipes Neotoma goldmani Neotoma insularis Neotoma lepida Neotoma leucodon Neotoma macrotis Neotoma magister Neotoma melanura Neotoma mexicana Neotoma micropus Neotoma nelsoni Neotoma palatina Neotoma phenax Neotoma stephensi

= Pack rat =

Pack rat Temporal range: Late Cenozoic - Recent

Genus of rodents

A pack rat or packrat, also called a woodrat or trade rat, are any species in the North and Central American rodent genus Neotoma. Pack rats have a rat-like appearance, with long tails, large ears, and large, black eyes. Pack rats are noticeably larger than deer mice, harvest mice, and grasshopper mice, and are usually somewhat larger than cotton rats.

== Species ==
Neotoma includes three subgenera (daggers (†) mark extinct species):

- Subgenus Neotoma
  - Neotoma albigula - white-throated woodrat
    - Neotoma albigula varia - Turner Island woodrat
  - Neotoma angustapalata - Tamaulipan woodrat
  - Neotoma bryanti - Bryant's woodrat
    - †Neotoma bryanti anthonyi - Anthony's woodrat
    - †Neotoma bryanti bunkeri - Bunker's woodrat
    - †Neotoma bryanti martinensis - San Martín Island woodrat
  - Neotoma chrysomelas - Nicaraguan woodrat
  - Neotoma devia - Arizona woodrat
  - Neotoma ferruginea - Guatemala woodrat
  - †Neotoma findleyi - Findley's woodrat
  - Neotoma floridana - eastern woodrat (Florida woodrat)
    - Neotoma floridana smalli - Key Largo woodrat
  - Neotoma fuscipes - dusky-footed woodrat
  - Neotoma goldmani - Goldman's woodrat
  - Neotoma insularis - Angel de la Guarda woodrat
  - Neotoma lepida - desert woodrat
  - Neotoma leucodon - white-toothed woodrat
  - Neotoma macrotis - big-eared woodrat
  - Neotoma magister - Allegheny woodrat
  - Neotoma melanura - Black-tailed woodrat
  - Neotoma mexicana - Mexican woodrat
  - Neotoma micropus - Southern Plains woodrat
  - Neotoma nelsoni - Nelson's woodrat
  - Neotoma palatina - Bolaños woodrat
  - Neotoma stephensi - Stephens' woodrat
- Subgenus Teanopus
  - Neotoma phenax - Sonoran woodrat
- Subgenus Teonoma
  - Neotoma cinerea - bushy-tailed woodrat

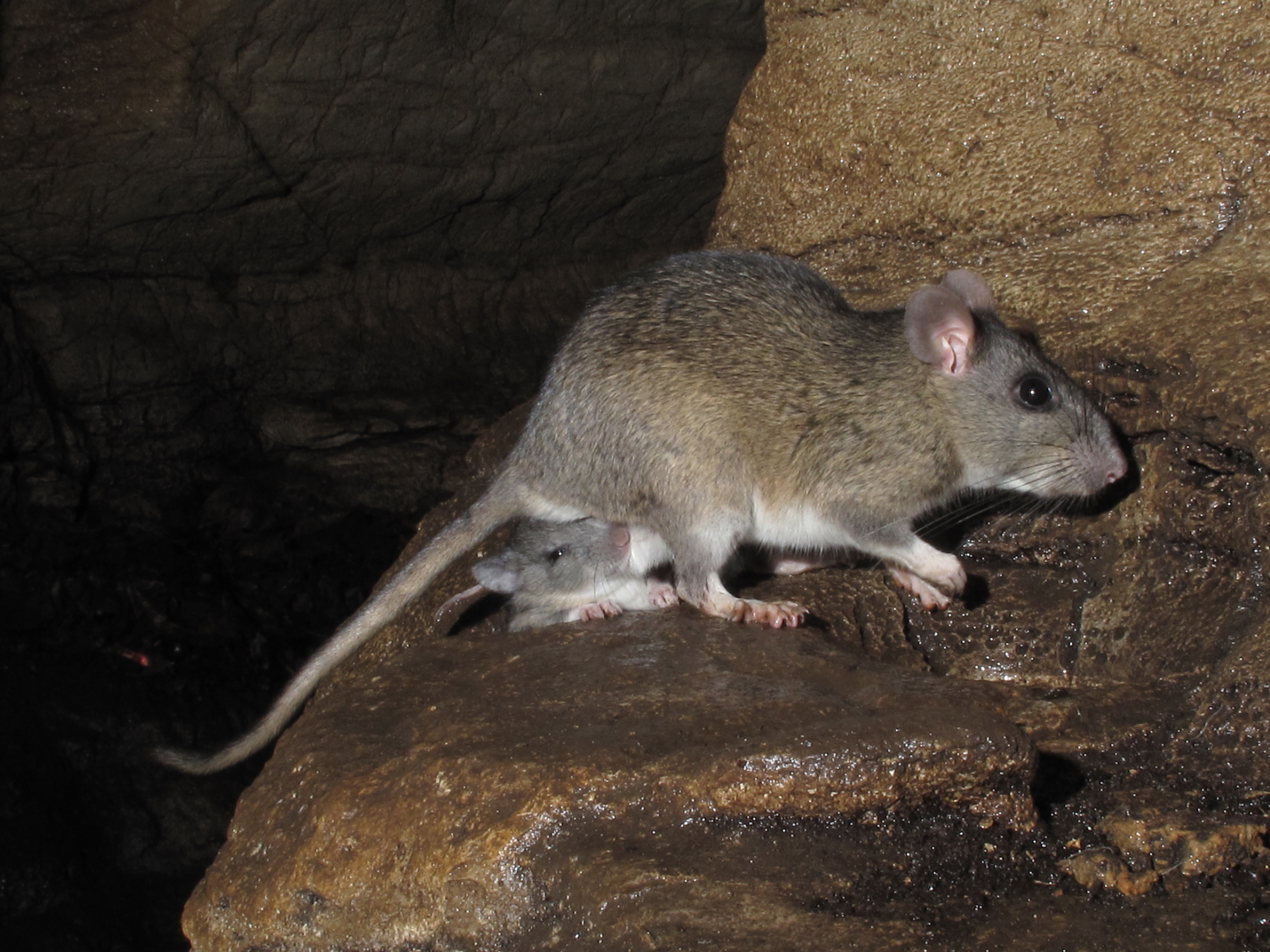
Alleghany woodrat

== Physical appearance ==
Packrats typically have wide eyes accompanied with long whiskers. They have large ears that extend outwards. In terms of size, they resemble Norway rats. They grow to be approximately 30 cm (12 in) long, with their tails making up about 50% of their size. Long-haired pack rats specifically have tails that are adequately furry and are physically compared to the tails of short-haired squirrels. In general, packrats' backs are notably a hybrid hue of brown and grey, but their underbelly tends to be a lighter shade.

== Range and distribution ==
Woodrats reach their greatest diversity in the deserts of the western United States and northern Mexico. Several species are also found in the deciduous forest of the east coast, juniper woodlands in the southwest, oak woodlands along the coastal western United States and in the Sonoran Desert, and in the forest and rocky habitats of the western United States and western Canada.

== Habitat ==
Each species of pack rat is generally restricted to a given type of habitat within its range. Pack rats live anywhere from low, hot, dry deserts to cold, rocky slopes above timberline. Pack rats build complex houses or dens made of twigs, cactus joints, and other materials. These contain several nest chambers, food caches, and debris piles. Dens are often built in small caves or rocky crevices, but when close by human habitations, woodrats will opportunistically move into the attics and walls of houses. Some Neotoma species, such as the white-throated woodrat (N. albigula), use the bases of prickly pear or cholla cactus as the sites for their homes, using the cactus' spines for protection from predators. Others, like the desert woodrat (N. lepida), will build dens around the base of a yucca or cactus, such as jumping and teddy-bear chollas. The largest species, Neotoma cinerea, has a bushy, almost squirrel-like tail. Bushy-tailed woodrats Neotoma cinerea occupy a range of habitats from boreal woodlands to deserts. They are cliff-dwellers and are often found on isolated, high-elevation exposed boulder areas under a variety of temperature and moisture conditions. They require adequate shelter among the rocks, though they are occasionally found inhabiting abandoned buildings as well.

== Characteristics ==
=== Behavior ===
Pack rats are nest builders. They use plant material such as twigs, sticks, and other available debris. They are particularly fond of shiny objects. A peculiar characteristic is that if they find something they want, they will drop what they are currently carrying—for example, a piece of cactus—and "trade" it for the new item. They can also be quite vocal and boisterous. They can easily become a nuisance by entering and inhabiting human spaces like attics or car engines, stealing their treasures from humans, damaging electrical wiring, and creating general noisy havoc.

=== Diet ===
Bushy-tailed woodrats feed primarily on green vegetation, twigs, and shoots. Mexican woodrats eat seeds, fruits, acorns, and cactus. The pack rat microbiome has symbiotic roles in digestion, recycling endogenous nitrogen, and the detoxification of dietary toxins. The bacterial composition of the pack rat's gut microbiome is affected by what it eats, and by association, the geography of where the animal is from. However, while the bacterial composition of the pack rat microbiome is influenced by diet and geography, it is the animals' genetics that has the most influential role on bacterial composition.

=== Size ===
Adult bushy-tailed woodrat males usually weigh 300–600 g (11–21 oz), with an average of 405 g (14.3 oz), and adult females usually weigh 250–350 g (8.8–12.3 oz), with an average of 270 g (9.5 oz). These ranges are relatively large because this species occupies a large geographic range, and its body size is closely correlated with climate. Average males range in size from 310 to 470 mm (12 to 19 in), with the average being 379 mm (14.9 in), and average females range from 272 to 410 mm (10.7 to 16.1 in), with the average being 356 mm (14.0 in).

=== Reproduction and life history ===
Reproductive habits of rodents are variable in the wild. Offspring are born naked and helpless and must be cared for in nests called middens. Some female pack rats have been known to deliver up to five litters per year with each litter having as many as five young. The offspring may open their eyes between 10 and 12 days after being born and are usually weaned between 14 and 42 days. After around 60 days, most become sexually mature. Populations may cycle approximately every 8 years due to variation in reproduction and juvenile survival. Female annual survival rates vary by age from 0.42 for juveniles to 0.71 for 1–2 year olds, and very few females (less than 5%) live beyond 3 years of age.

== Midden ==
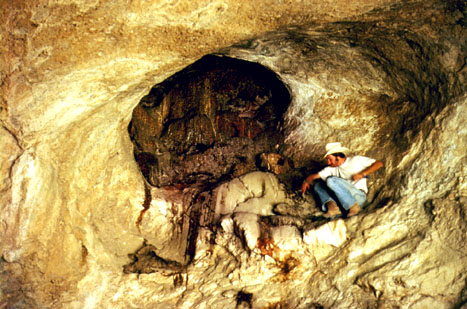
A large pack rat midden (center) from the Pleistocene period

A pack rat midden is a debris pile constructed by a woodrat. A midden may preserve the materials incorporated into it for up to 50,000 years. These midden piles may be analyzed to reconstruct their original environment, and comparisons between middens allow a record of vegetative and climate change to be built. Examinations and comparisons of pack rat middens have largely supplanted pollen records as a method of study in the regions where they are available.

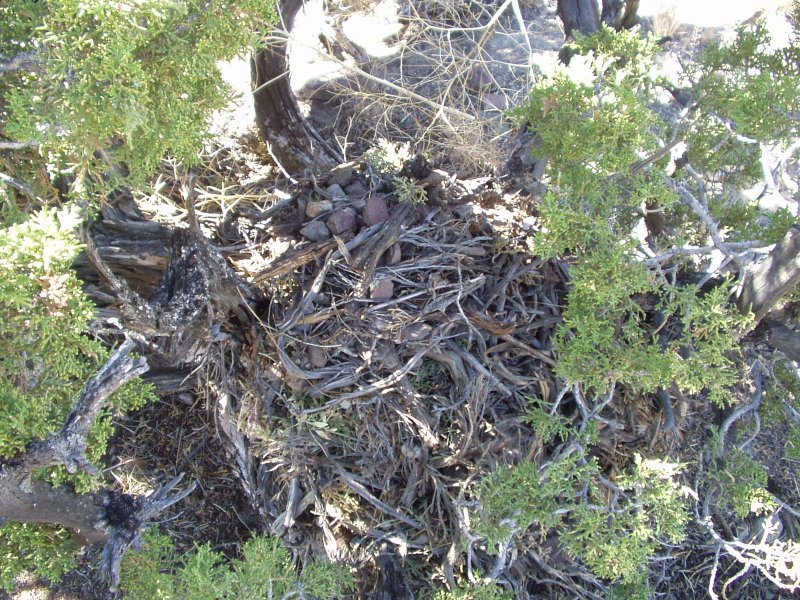
Active pack rat midden in northern Nevada

In the absence of rock crevices or caves, the dens are often built under trees or bushes. The pack rats will also use plant fragments, animal dung, and small rocks in building the den. The vast majority of the materials will be from a radius of several dozen yards of the nest. Woodrats often urinate on the debris piles; sugar and other substances in the urine crystallize as it dries out, creating a material known as amberat, which under some conditions can cement the midden together, and can encase plant fragments, pellets and other debris in an amber-like matrix. The resilience of the middens is aided by three factors. The crystallized urine dramatically slows the decay of the materials in the midden; the dry climate of the American Southwest further slows the decay; and middens protected from the elements under rock overhangs or in caves survive longer.

=== Climate indicators ===
Zoologists examine the remains of animals in middens to get a sense of the fauna in the neighborhood of the midden, while paleobotanists can reconstruct the vegetation that grew nearby. Middens are considered reliable "time capsules" of natural life, centuries and millennia after they occurred. Woodrat middens are composed of many things, including plants, macrofossils, and fecal pellets.

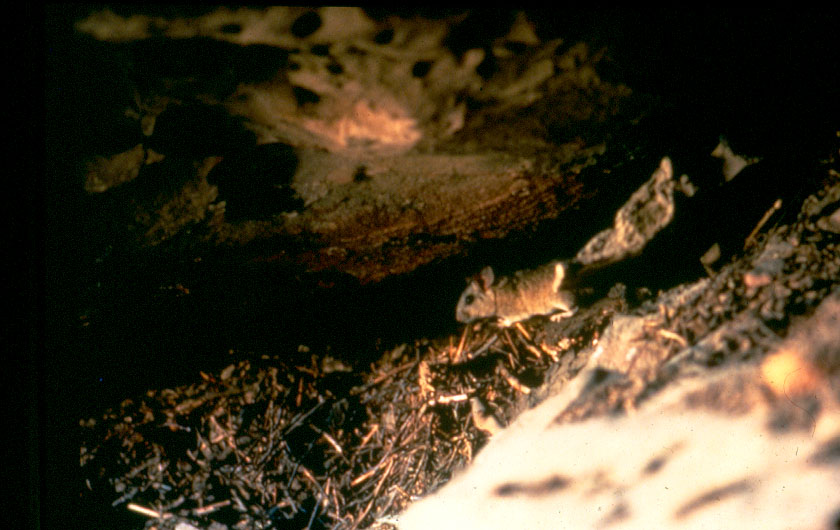
Bushy-tailed woodrat on midden

Paleo-ecologists have used a variety of techniques to analyze the plant and animal material in pack rat middens describe paleo-communities and infer paleo-climate. For example, the plant species present in middens, and the carbon isotope ratios on material in middens have been widely studied. The analysis of middens was key in understanding the biota around Pueblo Bonito, thus helping to explain its history.

One form of midden analysis examined the size of fecal pellets in pack rat middens. The size of woodrat pellet is proportional to the size of the woodrat. By measuring the pellets, the approximate size of the woodrat was determined based on data from a study of field-trapped woodrats. From Bergmann's rule, differences in climate then can be determined. According to Bergmann's rule, the body size of vertebrates is closely related to the average ambient air temperature in the region in which the vertebrate lives, so organisms in warmer regions are typically smaller than members of the same species in colder regions.
