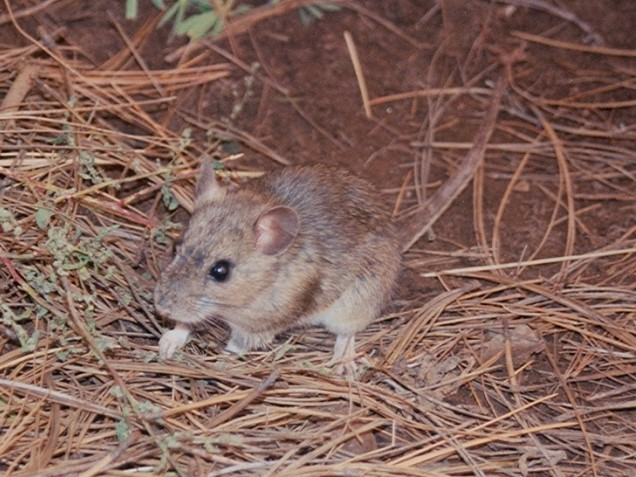

Conservation status
- Least Concern (IUCN 3.1)

Scientific classification
- Kingdom: Animalia
- Phylum: Chordata
- Class: Mammalia
- Order: Rodentia
- Family: Cricetidae
- Subfamily: Neotominae
- Genus: Neotoma
- Species: N. mexicana

Binomial name
- Neotoma mexicana Baird, 1855

= Mexican woodrat =

Species of rodent

The Mexican woodrat (Neotoma mexicana) is a medium-sized pack rat.

== Distribution and habitat ==
It ranges from the United States (Utah, Colorado, New Mexico and parts of Arizona and Trans-Pecos Texas) south to Honduras. Although occurring at lower elevations during the Pleistocene, it generally is limited now to highlands supporting open coniferous forests or woodlands. In a few places, it occurs in lower country where lava or boulder fields occur; presumably the presence of spaces extending far below the surface enables survival. Like most members of the genus living in rocky areas, dens tend to take advantage of crevices, rock shelters, and caves; stick nests are relatively rare.

== Taxonomy ==
The type locality is near Chihuahua, Mexico. Some 26 species names have been applied to populations of the Mexican woodrat and are now considered synonyms.

== Description and diet ==
The animal averages a bit over 300 mm (12 in) in total length and weighs 140 to 185 g (4.9 to 6.5 oz). Their diets tend to be generalist, with a wide variety of berries, vegetation, nuts, acorns, and fungi, though foliage seems to make up the major food class.
