= Sarcostemma =

Genus of plants

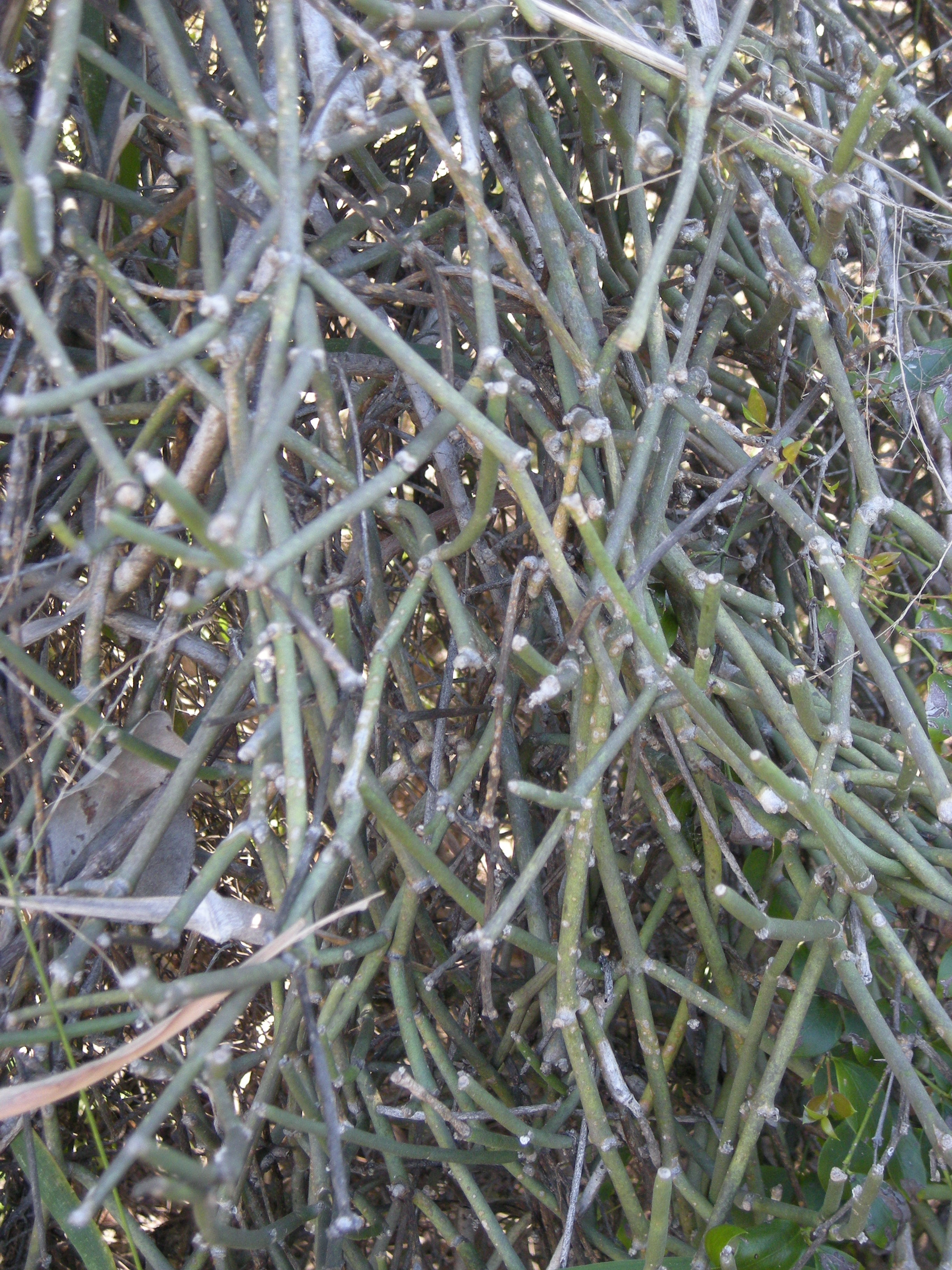
Sarcostemma australe

Sarcostemma is a formerly recognized genus of flowering plants in the dogbane family, Apocynaceae, first described as a genus in 1810. The name is derived from the Greek words σαρκὸς (sarkos), meaning "flesh," and στέμμα (stemma), meaning "garland". Members of the genus were known generally as climbing milkweeds or caustic bushes. The genus Sarcostemma has been shown to be nested within the genus Cynanchum, and in 2012 Sarcostemma was put into synonymy with Cynanchum.

== Selected former species ==
Moved to other genera (Cynanchum, Funastrum, Leptadenia, Philibertia).

- S. acidum (Roxb.) Voigt, syn. of Cynanchum acidum - S China, India, Nepal, N Indochina
- S. angustissima R.W.Holm, syn. of Funastrum angustissimum - Galápagos
- S. antsiranense, syn. of Cynanchum antsiranense
- S. aphyllum, syn. of Cynanchum viminale
- S. campanulatum, syn. of Philibertia campanulata
- S. carpophylloides, syn. of Funastrum gracile
- S. clausum (Jacq.) Schult., syn. of Funastrum clausum - Florida; much of Latin America + West Indies
- S. cynanchoides Decne., syn. of Funastrum cynanchoides - Coahuila in Mexico
- S. decorsei, syn. of Cynanchum decorsei
- S. donianum, syn. of Philibertia gilliesii
- S. elachistemmoides, syn. of Cynanchum elachistemmoides
- S. esculentum, syn. of Oxystelma esculentum
- S. flavum, syn. of Funastrum flavum
- S. gilliesii, syn. of Philibertia gilliesii
- S. gracile, syn. of Funastrum gracile
- S. grandiflorum, syn. of Philibertia gilliesii
- S. hastatum, syn. of Philibertia solanoides
- S. hirtellum (A.Gray) R.W.Holm, syn. of Funastrum hirtellum - California, Arizona, Nevada
- S. implicatum, syn. of Cynanchum implicatum
- S. incanum, syn. of Philibertia gilliesii
- S. insigne, syn. of Cynanchum insigne
- S. lehmannii, syn. of Pentacyphus lehmannii
- S. lysimachioides, syn. of Philibertia lysimachioides
- S. marsupiflorum, syn. of Philibertia solanoides
- S. mauritianum, syn. of Cynanchum luteifluens
- S. membranaceum, syn. of Cynanchum membranaceum
- S. mulanjense, syn. of Cynanchum viminale subsp. mulanjense
- S. odontolepis, syn. of Cynanchum viminale subsp. odontolepis
- S. odoratum, syn. of Funastrum odoratum
- S. oresbium, syn. of Cynanchum oresbium
- S. pannosum, syn. of Funastrum pannosum
- S. pyrotechnicum, syn. of Leptadenia pyrotechnica
- S. quadriflorum, syn. of Philibertia solanoides
- S. resiliens, syn. of Cynanchum resiliens
- S. rotundifolium, syn. of Funastrum pannosum
- S. solanoides, syn. of Philibertia solanoides
- S. stipitaceum, syn. of Cynanchum viminale subsp. stipitaceum
- S. stipitatum, syn. of Philibertia stipitata
- S. stoloniferum, syn. of Cynanchum stoloniferum
- S. tetrapterum, syn. of Cynanchum viminale
- S. tomentellum, syn. of Funastrum pannosum
- S. trichopetalum, syn. of Funastrum trichopetalum
- S. vailiae, syn. of Philibertia picta
- S. vanlessenii, syn. of Cynanchum vanlessenii
- S. variifolium, syn. of Philibertia solanoides
- S. viminale, syn. of Cynanchum viminale
