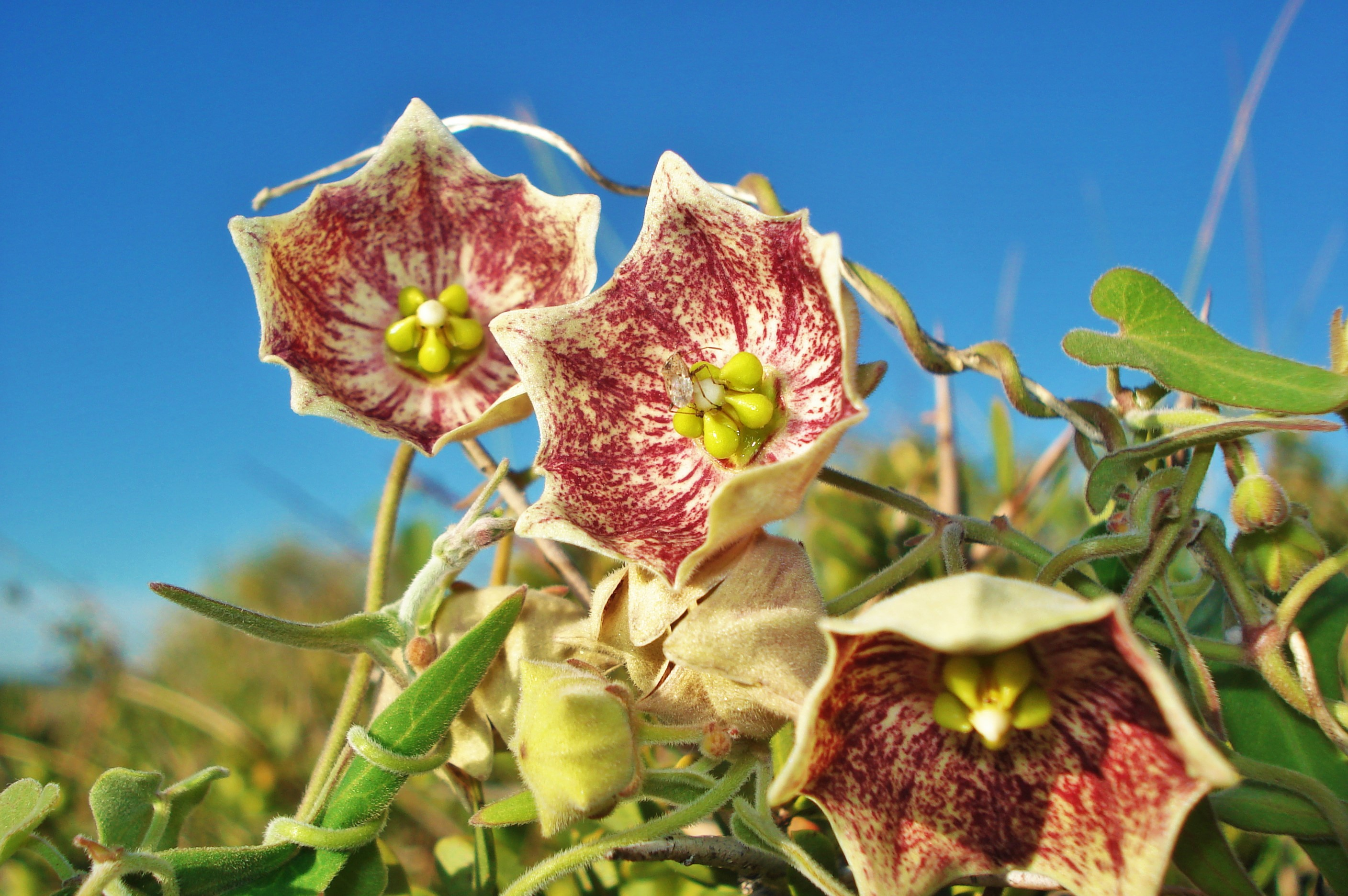
- Philibertia gilliesii

Scientific classification
- Kingdom: Plantae
- Clade: Tracheophytes
- Clade: Angiosperms
- Clade: Eudicots
- Clade: Asterids
- Order: Gentianales
- Family: Apocynaceae
- Tribe: Asclepiadeae
- Genus: Philibertia; Kunth 1819 not K.Schum. 1895

Synonyms
- Amblystigma Benth. (1876); Aphanostelma Malme (1933), nom. illeg.; Brachylepis Hook. & Arn. (1835), nom. illeg.; Fontellaea Morillo (1994); Lugonia Wedd. (1859); Melinia Decne. (1844); Mitostigma Decne. (1844); Pentagonium Schauer (1843); Podandra Baill. (1890); Steleostemma Schltr. (1906); Stelmatocodon Schltr. (1906); Stigmamblys Kuntze (1903), orth. var.; Zosima Phil. (1870), nom. illeg.

= Philibertia =

Genus of flowering plants

Philibertia is a genus of flowering plants in the family Apocynaceae, first described as a genus in 1819. It is native to South America.

Species

1. Philibertia affinis (Griseb.) Goyder - Argentina
2. Philibertia alba Goyder - Bolivia
3. Philibertia amblystigma Goyder - Bolivia
4. Philibertia barbata (Malme) Goyder - Jujuy Province in NW Argentina
5. Philibertia bicornuta (Griseb.) Goyder - Argentina
6. Philibertia boliviana (Baill.) Goyder - Argentina, Bolivia
7. Philibertia boliviensis (Schltr.) Goyder - S Bolivia
8. Philibertia campanulata (Lindl.) G. Nicholson - Cochabamba in Bolivia, Peru, Tucumán in Argentina
9. Philibertia candolleana Goyder - Mendoza in Argentina
10. Philibertia castillonii (Lillo) Goyder - Jujuy Province in NW Argentina
11. Philibertia cionophora (Griseb.) Goyder - Argentina
12. Philibertia coalita (Lillo) Goyder - Tucumán + Catamarca in Argentina
13. Philibertia discolor (Schltr.) Goyder - Tucumilla in Bolivia
14. Philibertia fiebrigii (Schltr.) Liede - S Bolivia
15. Philibertia fontellae Goyder - La Paz in Bolivia
16. Philibertia gilliesii Hook. & Arn. - Argentina, Uruguay
17. Philibertia globiflora Goyder - Cochabamba in Bolivia
18. Philibertia hastata (Decne.) Schltr. - Peru
19. Philibertia latiflora (Griseb.) Goyder - Argentina, Bolivia
20. Philibertia longistyla Goyder - Bolivia
21. Philibertia lysimachioides (Wedd.) T. Mey. - Argentina, Bolivia
22. Philibertia marsupiflora (Decne.) Schltr. - Peru
23. Philibertia micrantha (Malme ex R.E. Fr.) Goyder - Argentina
24. Philibertia mitophora (Griseb.) Goyder - Tucumán in Argentina
25. Philibertia multiflora (T. Mey.) Goyder - Salta in Argentina
26. Philibertia nivea (Griseb.) Goyder - Tucumán in Argentina
27. Philibertia parviflora (Malme) Goyder - Jujuy in Argentina
28. Philibertia peduncularis (Benth.) Goyder - La Paz in Bolivia
29. Philibertia picta Schltr. - S Bolivia
30. Philibertia religiosa Goyder - Cochabamba in Bolivia
31. Philibertia solanoides Kunth - Peru
32. Philibertia speciosa (Malme) Goyder - Bolivia, Jujuy in Argentina
33. Philibertia stipitata Lillo - Tucumán in Argentina
34. Philibertia suberecta Goyder - S Bolivia
35. Philibertia subnivea (Malme) Goyder - Salta in Argentina
36. Philibertia tactila Goyder - Tarija in Bolivia
37. Philibertia tomentosa (Decne.) Goyder - Tucumán in Argentina
38. Philibertia tubata (Malme) Goyder - Tucumán in Argentina
39. Philibertia tucumanensis (T. Mey.) Goyder - Tucumán in Argentina
40. Philibertia urceolata Goyder - Santa Cruz in Bolivia
41. Philibertia velutina Goyder - Chuquisaca in Bolivia
42. Philibertia volcanensis Goyder - Jujuy in Argentina
43. Philibertia zongoensis Goyder - La Paz in Bolivia

formerly included

moved to other genera (Blepharodon, Funastrum, Gonolobus)

1. P. anomala now Blepharodon mucronatum
2. P. arenarium now Funastrum arenarium
3. P. bicolor now Funastrum elegans
4. P. biloba now Funastrum bilobum
5. P. bonariensis now Funastrum clausum
6. P. clausa now Funastrum clausum
7. P. crassifolia now Funastrum clausum
8. P. crispa now Funastrum crispum
9. P. cumanensis now Funastrum clausum
10. P. cuspidata now Funastrum clausum
11. P. cynanchoides now Funastrum cynanchoides
12. P. dumetorum now Funastrum dumetorum
13. P. elegans (Decne.) Hemsl. now Funastrum elegans
14. P. elegans (Decne.) A. Gray now Funastrum elegans
15. P. ervendbergii now Funastrum ervendbergii
16. P. exserta now Funastrum gracile
17. P. fendleri now Funastrum bilobum
18. P. gardneri now Funastrum clausum
19. P. heterophylla now Funastrum cynanchoides subsp. hartwegii
20. P. hirtella now Funastrum hirtellum
21. P. lindeniana now Funastrum lindenianum
22. P. linearis now Funastrum cynanchoides subsp. hartwegii
23. P. longifolia now Funastrum flavum
24. P. lurida now Funastrum elegans
25. P. odorata now Funastrum odoratum
26. P. palmeri now Funastrum clausum
27. P. pannosa now Funastrum pannosum
28. P. pavonii now Funastrum pannosum
29. P. reflexa now Funastrum lindenianum
30. P. refracta now Funastrum refractum
31. P. riparia now Funastrum clausum
32. P. rotata now Gonolobus rostratus
33. P. rotundifolia now Funastrum pannosum
34. P. stellaris now Funastrum flavum
35. P. tomentella now Funastrum pannosum
36. P. torreyi now Funastrum torreyi
37. P. undulata now Funastrum crispum
38. P. viminalis now Funastrum clausum
