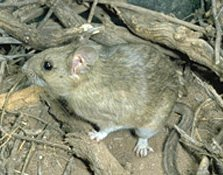

Conservation status
- Least Concern (IUCN 3.1)

Scientific classification
- Kingdom: Animalia
- Phylum: Chordata
- Class: Mammalia
- Order: Rodentia
- Family: Cricetidae
- Subfamily: Neotominae
- Genus: Neotoma
- Species: N. albigula

Binomial name
- Neotoma albigula Hartley, 1894

Subspecies
- Neotoma albigula varia

= White-throated woodrat =

Species of rodent

The white-throated woodrat (Neotoma albigula) is a species of rodent in the family Cricetidae. It is found from central Mexico north to Utah and Colorado in the United States. It is primarily a western species in the United States, extending from central Texas west to southeastern California. Populations east of the Rio Grande in New Mexico and Trans-Pecos Texas, previously considered to be variants of the white-throated woodrat, have since 1988 been assigned to the white-toothed woodrat (N. leucodon).

The animal lives mostly in the Upper and Lower Sonoran life zones, occurring from pinyon-juniper woodland in higher country to desert habitats at lower elevations.

As with other species of woodrats, the white-throated woodrat constructs middens of a variety of materials such as sticks, cactus parts, and miscellaneous debris. An above-ground chamber within the midden contains a nest lined with grasses and kept free of feces. In non-rocky areas, the den usually is several feet in diameter and most commonly built around the base of a shrub that gives additional cover. In areas of rocky outcrops, crevices often are utilized, with sticks and other materials preventing free access to the nesting chamber.

Molecular data suggest that this species separated from other species of the Neotoma floridana group (Neotoma floridana, Neotoma micropus, Neotoma leucodon) about 155,000 years ago during the Illinoian Stage of the Pleistocene. This is consistent with the oldest known fossils from Slaton, Texas. This rodent is a common fossil in Southwestern cave faunas, with over 20 fossil localities of Pleistocene age known from New Mexico alone.

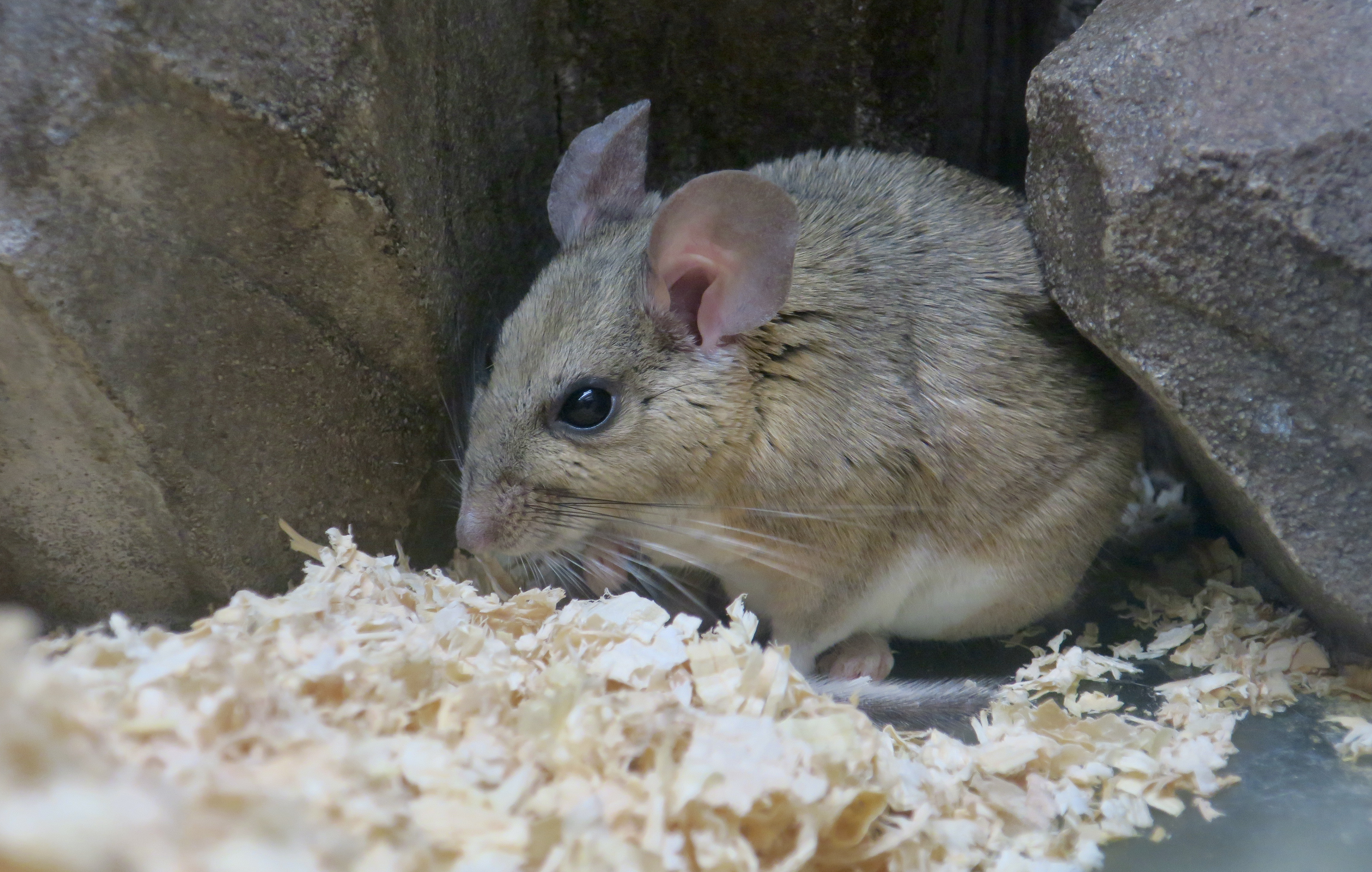
At Wildlife World Zoo.

== Distribution ==
The ranges of the white-throated woodrat and its subspecies are from the southeastern corners of Nevada and California across southern Utah and all of Arizona to southwestern Colorado, across west Texas and south to central Mexico.

- N. a. albigula (Hartley) – Northern New Mexico and northeastern Arizona south along the east side of the Sierra Madre Oriental, to southern Coahuila, Mexico. Also central Texas to western Arizona, and south along the western side of the Sierra Madre Occidental to central Sonora
- N. a. brevicauda (Durrant) – Utah and Colorado
- N. a. durangae (J. A. Allen) – Southwestern Chihuahua and central Durango, Mexico
- N. a. laplataensis (F.W. Miller) – Utah, Colorado, and Arizona
- N. a. latifrons (Merriam) – Michoacán, Mexico
- N. a. leucodon (Merriam) – East of the Rio Grande in New Mexico, Texas, and Oklahoma; Durango, Zacatecas, San Luis Potosí, Guanajuato, Jalisco, Aguascalientes, Querétaro, Hidalgo, and southeastern Coahuila, Mexico
- N. a. mearnsi (Goldman) – Arizona
- N. a. melanura (Merriam) – Central Sonora, Chihuahua, and Sinaloa, Mexico
- N. a. melas (Dice) – New Mexico
- N. a. robusta (Blair) – Texas
- N. a. seri (Townsend) – Northeastern Sonora, Mexico
- N. a. sheldoni (Goldman) – Northeastern Sonora, Mexico
- N. a. subsolana (Alvarez) – Coahuila, Tamaulipas, Nuevo León, and Coahuila, Mexico
- N. a. venusta (True) – Colorado River valley in western Arizona south to Sonora and Baja California, Mexico
- N. a. warreni – Colorado, Oklahoma, northeastern New Mexico, and Texas

In general, white-throated woodrats occupy desert grasslands, semiarid shrublands, saguaro (Carnegiea gigantea) cactus communities, pinyon-juniper (Pinus-Juniperus spp.) woodlands, interior ponderosa pine (P. ponderosa var. scopulorum) forests, and Madrean evergreen woodland (Pinus spp.-Quercus spp.).

== Preferred habitat ==
The white-throated woodrat occupies a variety of plant communities from sea level to 9,200 feet (2,800 m) but is most common in Sonoran and Chihuahuan desert grassland and desert shrub habitats. The white-throated woodrat is generally associated with creosotebush, mesquite, cacti (particularly prickly-pear and cholla (Cylindropuntia spp.)), catclaw acacia, and paloverde. These plants provide cover and succulent plant food (>50% water by weight) (see section "Food habits"), the 2 most critical habitat requirements for white-throated woodrat.

White-throated woodrats prefer habitat with low tree canopy cover, high shrub and rock cover, and coarse woody debris. When available, natural and human constructed riparian habitat may be used by white-throated woodrats.

=== Tree, shrub, and rock cover ===
In several studies in Arizona, white-throated woodrats preferred low tree cover and high shrub, rock, and litter cover. In ponderosa pine-Gambel oak habitat in the Hualapai Mountains in Arizona, white-throated woodrat presence was negatively associated with high tree cover and high herbaceous cover and positively associated with high shrub and rock cover. On plots where white-throated woodrats were trapped, mean tree canopy cover ranged from 30% to 57%, mean herbaceous cover ranged from 2% to 10%, mean shrub cover ranged from 5% to 19%, and mean rock cover ranged from 3% to 14%.

In desert riparian floodplain habitat at Montezuma Castle National Monument, Arizona, white-throated woodrats were more abundant in an active riparian channel and floodplain that had lower tree cover and a higher percentage of forbs and rocks than a mesquite bosque. The active riparian channel and floodplain was dominated by desert willow, velvet ash (Fraxinus velutina), Arizona sycamore (Platanus wrightii), and velvet mesquite. The mesquite bosque was dominated by velvet mesquite, catclaw acacia, and broom snakeweed.

In pinyon-juniper woodlands in Grant County, New Mexico, total overstory density was more important than overstory species composition in influencing white-throated woodrat occurrence. The greatest densities of white-throated woodrat houses were on plots containing 376 to 750 overstory plants per hectare:

White-throated woodrats prefer rocky areas within forested habitat, including ledges, slides, cliffs, and canyons. In a ponderosa pine forest on the Beaver Creek Watershed in the Coconino National Forest, all white-throated woodrats were captured within 210 feet (64 m) of rocky habitat. In ponderosa pine-Gambel oak habitat in the Hualapai Mountains, white-throated woodrat presence was positively associated with high (3% to 19%) rock cover.

=== Riparian ===
The white-throated woodrat is well-adapted to xeric habitats, but may also be found in riparian areas. They may utilize both natural and human-constructed areas when available.

==== Natural ====
At Montezuma Castle National Monument, white-throated woodrat abundance was generally greater in an active riparian channel and floodplain than a mesquite bosque that was 7 to 13 feet (2.1–4.0 m) above the channel and floodplain and not subject to flooding. The active riparian channel and floodplain was dominated by desert willow, velvet ash, Arizona sycamore, and velvet mesquite. The mesquite bosque was dominated by velvet mesquite, catclaw acacia, and broom snakeweed. Despite greater abundance of white-throated woodrat in the active riparian channel and floodplain, body weights of male white-throated woodrat were significantly (P<0.05) higher in the mesquite bosque, suggesting that it was "higher quality" habitat.

Although preferred habitat differed between male and female white-throated woodrats on the Santa Rita Experimental Range, Arizona, both genders showed some preference for riparian woodland typified by Arizona white oak and netleaf hackberry:

==== Human constructed ====
Construction of water developments in xeric habitat in Arizona may provide habitat and water for white-throated woodrats. On the Cabeza Prieta National Wildlife Refuge in southwestern Arizona, white-throated woodrats were trapped most often in velvet Mesquite Bosque thickets that grew closest to a human constructed water development. White-throated woodrats were trapped least often in habitat dominated by creosotebush and furthest away (distance not given) from the water development. No white-throated woodrats were trapped at a nearby dry water development.

White-throated woodrats also occupied a human constructed desert riparian habitat at No Name Lake on the Colorado River Indian Reservation on the Arizona side of the Colorado River. The area was cleared of nonnative tamarisk (Tamarix spp.) and 80% of the area was planted with native Fremont cottonwood and honey mesquite. Other vegetation included Goodding's willow Salix gooddingii, blue paloverde (Parkinsonia florida), big saltbush (Atriplex lentiformis), and California fan palm (Washingtonia filifera).

=== Coarse woody debris ===
Habitat with abundant coarse woody debris is preferred by white-throated woodrats for cover (see Cover). In pinyon-juniper woodlands at the Piñon Canyon Maneuver site near Trinidad, Colorado, white-throated woodrats were captured most often in areas with coarse woody debris. In an actively flooded riparian channel and floodplain at Montezuma Castle National Monument, white-throated woodrat occurrence was significantly (P<0.05) greater in areas containing coarse woody debris than areas without coarse woody debris.

In a pinyon-juniper woodland in the Gila National Forest, New Mexico, white-throated woodrats responded favorably to mechanical treatments that increased the amount of coarse woody debris. Of 4 treatments (untreated; bulldozed/piled/burned; bulldozed; and thinned), white-throated woodrats were most abundant on bulldozed plots and thinned plots, where slash accumulations were 2.5 to 3 times greater than on other plots. On bulldozed plots, Colorado pinyon, one-seed juniper, and alligator juniper trees were pushed over and left in place. On thinned plots, Colorado pinyon and juniper were cut to a minimum spacing of 20 feet (6.1 m) and left in place. The table below shows total numbers of woodrats on 4 plots:

White-throated woodrat density increased in a pinyon-juniper woodland in Grant County, New Mexico, where trees were uprooted and piled to improve livestock grazing. The felled trees provided white-throated woodrats with cover and building materials.

== Cover requirements ==
White-throated woodrats must rely on self-constructed, ground-level shelter to lower the energetic costs of thermoregulation in extreme environments. White-throated woodrats typically use 2 types of shelter: houses, constructed at the base of plants, and dens in rock crevices. Other shelter types include holes and crevices in cutbanks along washes, burrows of other animals, piles of coarse woody debris, and human habitations and structures. Houses and dens are often maintained by successive generations of white-throated woodrats.

Houses are built by white-throated woodrats at the base of trees, shrubs, and cacti or in piles of coarse woody debris. White-throated woodrats prefer to construct houses at the bases of plants that provide both adequate shelter and food. Houses are constructed of various materials and are typically 3 to 10 feet (1–3 m) in diameter and up to 3 feet tall. Dens function as houses but are located in rock crevices, rock fissures, and under boulder piles.

Houses and dens enclose a system of runways and chambers, including the white-throated woodrat's nest. The nest averages 8 inches (200 mm) in diameter and is composed of soft, fine material including grass, shredded prickly-pear fibers, or juniper bark.

=== Building materials ===
White-throated woodrats use locally available building materials to construct houses. In wooded areas, white-throated woodrats use sticks and other debris, and in deserts, parts of cacti, catclaw acacia, mesquite, and yucca are typically used. Cactus parts are preferred building materials; preference for cacti is so strong that white-throated woodrat houses may not contain a proportionally representative sample of the surrounding plant community. Other building materials used by white-throated woodrats across their range include feces, bones, and human objects. Of 100 white-throated woodrat houses found on the Santa Rita Experimental Range, 75 different items were used for construction. The most commonly used building materials included mesquite, catclaw acacia, paloverde, desert ironwood (Olneya tesota), and creosotebush twigs; cholla joints and fruits; portions of prickly-pear where it was abundant; and juniper, pinyon pine, and oak twigs where they were abundant. Other items included horse, cow, and coyote dung, animal bones, stones, and human-discarded materials.

Building materials are gathered near the white-throated woodrat's shelter. At McDowell Mountain Regional Park, Arizona, white-throated woodrats gathered 30% of house building materials within 33 feet (10 m) from their shelter. Houses and dens are altered and refurbished during the year using new and old building materials.

In Guadalupe Mountains National Park and the Lower Sonoran zone of Arizona, use of building materials depended on availability. Juniper leaves and berries were used most often in a pinyon-juniper woodland, and mesquite leaves and pods and Christmas cactus (Cylindropuntia leptocaulis) joints were used most often in a desert scrub habitat. In the Lower Sonoran desert of Arizona, white-throated woodrats favored some plants because of their structural and food values and favored other plants due to their availability. When available, cholla was used most often for building material due to its structural and food values. Mesquite sticks were used frequently. Although mesquite was seldom used for food, mesquite sticks were abundant at the base of plants so they were readily available. White bursage (Ambrosia dumosa) was very abundant and used for building material, even though plants were too small to shelter a white-throated woodrat den.

=== Shelter sites ===
Cover near the ground is an important criterion for white-throated woodrat shelter sites. In northern portions of their range, white-throated woodrats tend to construct houses at the bases of trees; in southern portions of their range, white-throated woodrats tend to construct houses at the bases of shrub-trees, shrubs, or cacti. When available, rocks are preferred by white-throated woodrats for shelter because they provide more protection from variations in ambient temperature than the base of plants.

==== Plants ====
Although any tree, shrub, or cactus may be used by white-throated woodrats for shelter sites, the most commonly used plants are discussed below.

White-throated woodrats construct houses at the base of live and dead fallen juniper trees in pinyon-juniper woodlands in Arizona, New Mexico, Utah, and Texas. The base of pinyons are occasionally used.

Mesquite is often favored by white-throated woodrats for shelter in habitat dominated by mesquite in New Mexico, Arizona, California, and Texas. In habitat dominated by mesquite and creosote bush in San Diego County, California, all white-throated woodrat houses were located at the bases of honey mesquite. Twenty to 26-foot tall (6–8 m) honey mesquite were preferred over 3 to 10 foot (1–3 m) tall honey mesquite, probably because they provided more shelter and abundant, accessible food. An exception in habitat dominated by mesquite occurred on the Santa Cruz river bottom near Tucson, Arizona, where white-throated woodrat houses were also built under netleaf hackberry, American black elderberry (Sambucus nigra), skunkbush sumac (Rhus trilobata), bear grass (Nolina spp.), or saguaro.

In habitats where yucca are abundant white-throated woodrats use the base of yucca for shelter sites. On the Jornada Experiment Range in New Mexico, and the Black Gap Wildlife Management Refuge in Trans-Pecos Texas, white-throated woodrats built houses at the bases and fallen trunks of yucca. Soaptree yucca was used by white-throated woodrats in the lower Sonoran zone of the Lordsburg Plains in New Mexico and the San Simon Valley in Arizona.

Cholla and prickly-pear are often used by white-throated woodrats for cover because they provide excellent protection from predators, as well as food and water. One of the factors in white-throated woodrat shelter-site selection in McDowell Mountain Regional Park was presence of teddy bear cholla. In the Cholla Garden in Joshua Tree National Park, white-throated woodrats depended on stands of jumping cholla (Cylindropuntia fulgida) for cover, and in the Lower Sonoran zone of Arizona, most white-throated woodrat dens were found at the bases of cholla and prickly-pear.

In Guadalupe Mountains National Park, white-throated woodrat distribution may be limited more by the presence of Mexican woodrats (N. mexicana) and the southern plains woodrat (N. micropus) than by habitat limitations. In areas not inhabited by Mexican woodrats and southern plains woodrats, the white-throated woodrat constructed houses at bases of prickly-pears. In areas where white-throated woodrats and southern plains woodrats lived in close proximity, white-throated woodrat constructed houses under honey mesquite.

In the Lower Sonoran zone of Arizona and New Mexico, white-throated woodrats commonly used the bases of catclaw acacia for shelter.

White-throated woodrats selected multiple-stemmed plants over single-stemmed plants and a dense, low canopy over a tall, thin canopy in habitat dominated by triangle bursage in Organ Pipe Cactus National Monument in Arizona and New Mexico. White-throated woodrats selected house sites in reverse order of plant abundance: yellow paloverde 18.1 plants/ha, 6 houses; desert ironwood, 7.6 plants/ha, 14 houses; and organ pipe cactus, 5.0 plants/ha, 21 houses. Yellow paloverde was probably selected for shelter least often because it is a single-stemmed tree with a tall canopy; organpipe cactus (Stenocereus thurberi) was probably selected most often because it is a multiple-stemmed plant with many cylindrical stems branching near the ground from a central trunk, providing more cover.

==== Other shelter sites ====
In juniper woodlands in the high desert of southeastern Utah, white-throated woodrats occasionally denned under boulder crevices at the bases of vertical cliffs. In habitat dominated by brittle bush in Saguaro National Monument, all 103 white-throated woodrat dens were located within jumbles of rocks or under boulders. Ninety-one dens were located under boulders >7 feet (2 m) in diameter, and 12 dens were located under boulders <7 feet in diameter.

White-throated woodrats occasionally use river banks, subterranean areas, or caves for shelter. In habitat dominated by honey mesquite and creosotebush at Carrizo Creek in San Diego County, white-throated woodrats sought cover either in river banks or burrows that were probably excavated by kangaroo rats (Dipodomys spp.). Lack of stick houses may have been due to a harsh summer climate, ease of burrowing in loose sand, scarcity of building materials, or adequate overhead protection by honey mesquite. River banks were 6 to 15 feet (2–5 m) high, and burrows were excavated at various heights from the bottom. Hole diameter was 3.5 to 7 inches (8.9–18 cm). White-throated woodrats also dwelled in burrows with as many as 8 openings, covered with a few small twigs, at the bases of honey mesquite. In a similar habitat type in the Mesilla Valley of New Mexico, white-throated woodrats denned in sand dunes created by banner-tailed kangaroo rats (D. spectabilis) around honey mesquite.

== Timing of major life events ==
The white-throated woodrat is a small rodent measuring an average of 12.9 inches (330 mm) and weighing an average of 188 g (6.6 oz) for females and 224 g (7.9 oz) for males. With the exception of lactating females, white-throated woodrats are solitary and occupy separate houses. They are primarily nocturnal and are active year-round. According to Brown and Zeng, maximum longevity for the white-throated woodrat is 45 months, and according to Newton, maximum longevity is 72 months.

The mating season of white-throated woodrats varies across their range. In Arizona, the mating season is from January to August. In Big Bend National Park, Texas, mating occurs at least from January to November and may occur year-round. In California, the mating season is in February and March, according to Rainey, and in March, April, and possibly May, according to Schwartz and Bleich. The mating system of the white-throated woodrat is polygynous.

Gestation for white-throated woodrats lasts 37 to 38 days, and young are most often born in spring and early summer. In Arizona, mean litter sizes were 1.95 young/litter (n=93 litters) and 2.5 young/litter (n=27 litters).

Young white-throated woodrats are weaned 62 to 72 days after birth and reach sexual maturity 166 to 176 days after birth. Weaning and sexual maturity of the subspecies N. a. venusta in western Arizona, Sonora, and Baja California occur earlier: young are weaned between 27 and 40 days, and reach sexual maturity 80 to 87 days after birth. In Joshua Tree National Monument, California, young white-throated woodrats establish their own dens by August and September, several months after birth.

Descriptions of the home range of the white-throated woodrat are lacking. The home range of 1 immature female white-throated woodrat on the Coconino National Forest, Arizona, was 47,760 ft^{2} (4,437 m^{2}).

White-throated woodrat density may be governed by the number of suitable plants available for shelter, food, and water. In Joshua Tree National Monument, there was a significant (P<0.001) positive relationship between white-throated woodrat density and teddybear cholla density, which provided shelter, food, and water. In the Mesilla Valley of southern New Mexico, white-throated woodrat density was more dependent on plants that provided sufficient water and food than on plants that provided shelter.

== Food habits ==
White-throated woodrats are opportunistic and primarily herbivorous. Their diet consists of seeds, fruits, green portions of plants, flowers, small amounts of grass, and occasionally beetles (Coleoptera), ants (Hymenoptera), and reptiles. Some of the most commonly consumed plants across the white-throated woodrat's range include mesquite flowers, leaves, seeds, and bark, cacti flowers, stems, and fruits, and yucca leaves.

Foods eaten by white-throated woodrats depend on availability. In Great Basin scrub desert and juniper woodlands in northern Arizona (Coconino County) white-throated woodrat diet was 29% yucca, 24% juniper, 7% rabbitbrush (Chrysothamnus spp.), 6% sumac, 5% Apache-plume (Fallugia spp.), 4% sagebrush (Artemisia spp.), 4% saltbush, and 3% ephedra (Ephedra spp.). In the Lower Sonoran zone of southern Arizona (Santa Rita Experimental Range), cacti and mesquite were the primary foods eaten. When offered a choice between cacti with spines and cacti without, white-throated woodrats preferred those with spines, possibly because spines indicate cacti with more protein and less fibre. They also placed the spines around their nests, acting as a defence against predators. For a complete list of foods eaten by white-throated woodrats in the Santa Rita Experimental Range, see Vorhies and Taylor. In the southern Great Basin, Navajo yucca (Y. baileyi) is an important food for the white-throated woodrat.

White-throated woodrats require large amounts of water obtained through various xerophytic plants, especially cacti. In Organ Pipe National Monument, white-throated woodrats relied heavily on teddybear cholla, buckhorn cholla (Cylindropuntia acanthocarpa), jumping cholla, and goatnut (Simmondsia spp.) for water. In Coconino County, white-throated woodrats obtained water from evergreen species (Ephedra spp., Yucca spp., and Juniperus spp.), which maintained a high year-round water content.

The white-throated woodrat diet varies seasonally. In Coconino County, white-throated woodrats ate a variety of plants, including deciduous shrubs, during warm, wet months when plant moisture was high. During cool, dry months, their diet was restricted largely to evergreen plants. Regardless of season, white-throated woodrats preferred to eat evergreen species. At Carrizo Creek, honey mesquite leaves, flowers, and fruits were the main foods eaten from the end of March until the end of summer. After honey mesquite lost its leaves, white-throated woodrats subsisted on stored beans, bark, and stems.

Some white-throated woodrats store food in their houses. Of 30 white-throated woodrat dens found in Doña Ana County, New Mexico, 77% contained stored food. The average weight of stored food was 2.2 pounds (1.00 kg)/den, range 0.1 to 9.3 pounds (0.045 to 4.218 kg)/den. Most stored food consisted of mesquite beans and cacti and forb seeds. In general, white-throated woodrats collect food within a 98-to-164-foot (30 to 50 m) radius of their dens.

== Predators ==
Predators of white-throated woodrat include weasels (Mustela spp.), bobcats (Lynx rufus), ringtails (Bassariscus astutus), coyotes (Canis latrans), American badgers (Taxidea taxus), Mexican spotted owls (Strix occidentalis lucida), great horned owls (Bubo virginianus), bullsnakes (Pituophis catenifer sayi), and rattlesnakes (Crotalus spp.).
