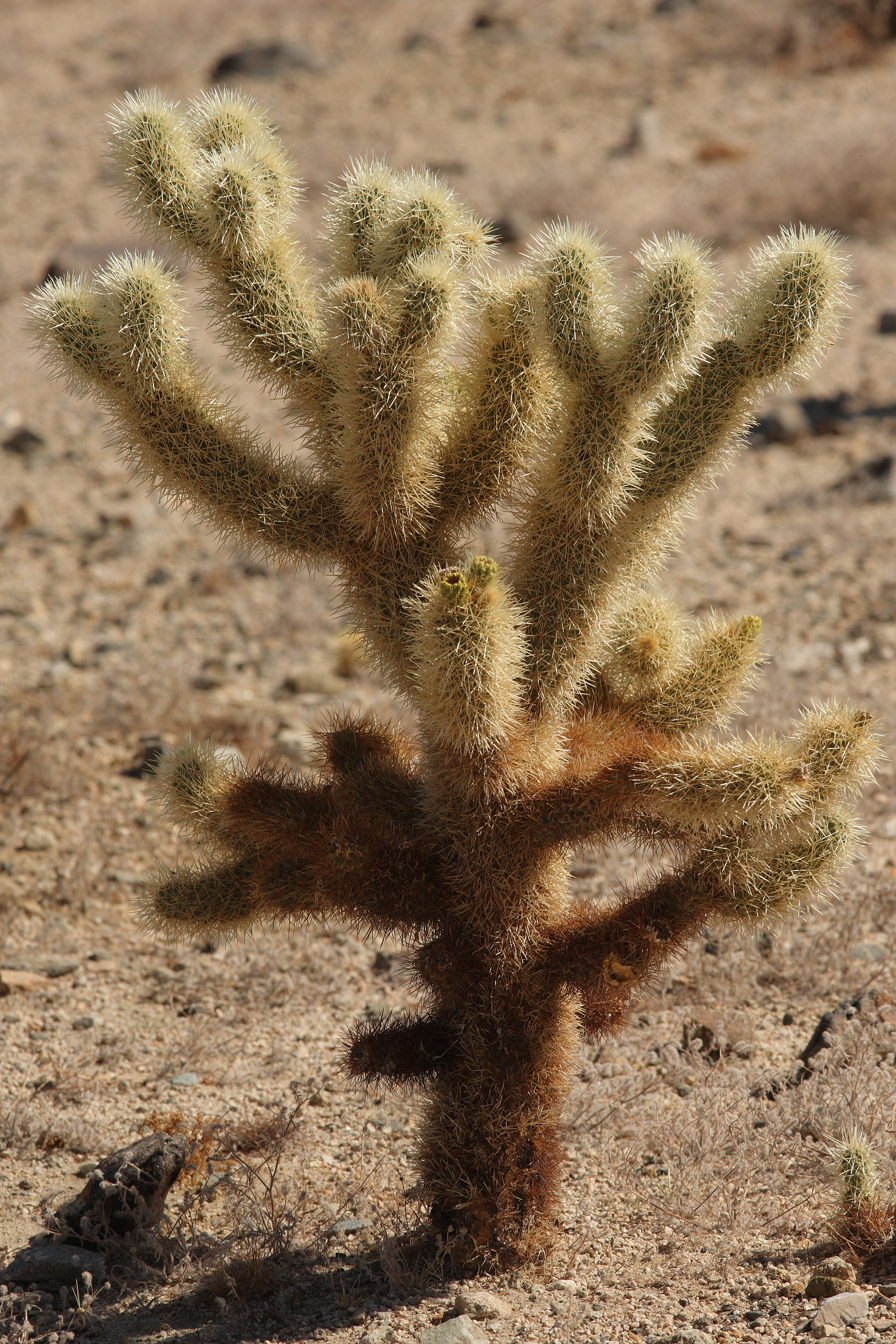

Conservation status
- Least Concern (IUCN 3.1)

Scientific classification
- Kingdom: Plantae
- Clade: Tracheophytes
- Clade: Angiosperms
- Clade: Eudicots
- Order: Caryophyllales
- Family: Cactaceae
- Genus: Cylindropuntia
- Species: C. bigelovii

Binomial name
- Cylindropuntia bigelovii (Engelm.) F.M.Knuth
- Natural range of Cylindropuntia bigelovii, estimated with iNaturalist Geomodel

Synonyms
- Opuntia bigelovii

= Cylindropuntia bigelovii =

Teddy-bear cholla

Species of cactus

Cylindropuntia bigelovii, the teddy-bear cholla, is a cholla cactus species native to Northwestern Mexico, and to the United States in California, Arizona, and Nevada.

== Description ==
Cylindropuntia bigelovii has a soft appearance due to its solid mass of very formidable spines that completely cover the stems, leading to its sardonic nickname of "teddy bear".

The teddy-bear cholla stands 1 to 5 ft (0.30 to 1.52 m) tall with a distinct trunk. The branches or lobes are at the top of the trunk and are nearly horizontal. Lower branches typically fall off, and the trunk darkens with age. The silvery-white spines, which are actually a form of leaf, almost completely obscure the stem with a fuzzy-looking but impenetrable defense. The spines are 1 in (2.5 cm) long and covered with a detachable, paper-like sheath.

Yellow-green flowers emerge at the tips of the stems in May and June. Flowers are usually 3.6 cm (1.4 in) in length and produce fruit that is 1.9 cm (0.75 in) in diameter, tuberculate, and may or may not have spines. These fruits contain few if any viable seeds as the plant usually reproduces through a dispersal strategy of dropped or carried stems. These stems are often carried for some distance by sticking to the fur or skin of animals and are especially painful to remove. When a piece of this cholla sticks to an animal or person, a good method to remove the cactus is with a hair comb. The spines have microscopic barbs which point backwards and hold on tightly. Often small stands of these chollas form, most of which are clones of the same individual.

Like its cousin the jumping cholla, the stems detach easily, and the ground around a mature plant is often littered with scattered cholla balls and small plants starting where these balls have rooted.

== Wildlife ==
Desert pack rats such as the desert woodrat gather these balls around their burrows, creating a defense against most predators like kit fox and coyote, however several species of snake feed on the rat, keeping its population balanced.

The cactus wren can be found perched on the cholla and other cacti. They also use a variety of cacti for nesting purposes.

The "jumping" part of the name is said to have originated because a person who is walking in the desert can step on a grounded stem with the heel of a boot or a shoe, which can cause the stem to swivel up and embed spines in the walker's calf.

== Distribution ==
Cylindropuntia bigelovii grows in desert regions at elevations to about 3,000 ft (900 m) in the "Low Desert" or Colorado Desert of Southern California, and in other Sonoran Desert regions of the Southwestern United States and northwestern Mexico.

In the Lower Colorado River Valley, the most dense Cylindropuntia bigelovii stands are at higher elevations, in the rockiest sites. There are fewer Sonoran Desert or Colorado Desert plant association species, but two are common though reduced in size: ocotillo (Fouquieria splendens) and saguaro (Carnegiea gigantea).

The teddy bear cholla is also found in a protected Cholla Cactus Garden as part of the Joshua Tree National Park among other desert plants such as the desert senna, pencil cholla, creosote bush, jojoba, and climbing milkweed Funastrum cynanchoides which can climb and cover the teddy bear cholla and may even kill it.

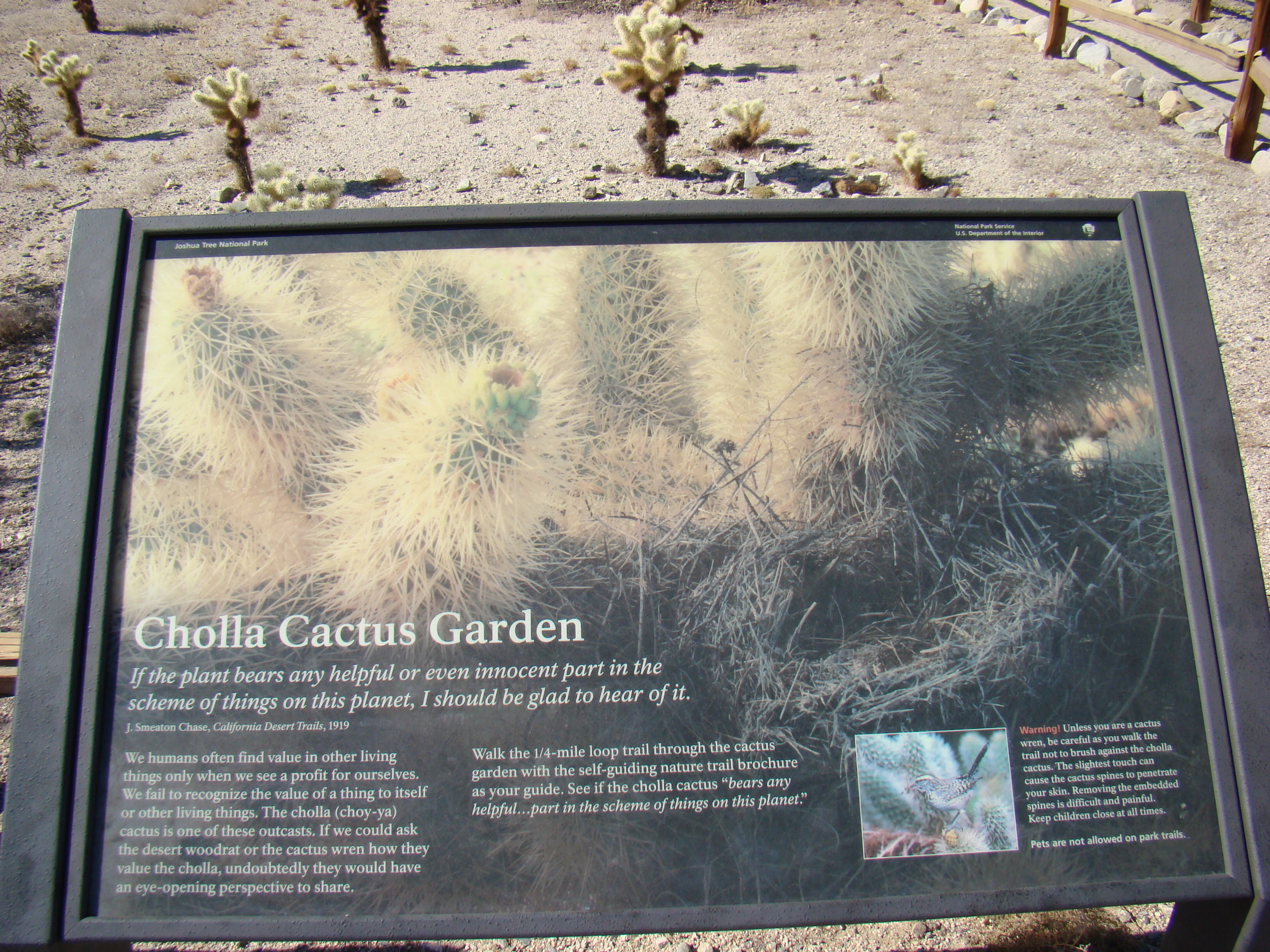
Cholla Cactus Garden Nature Trail information display by Joshua Tree National Park

== Gallery ==
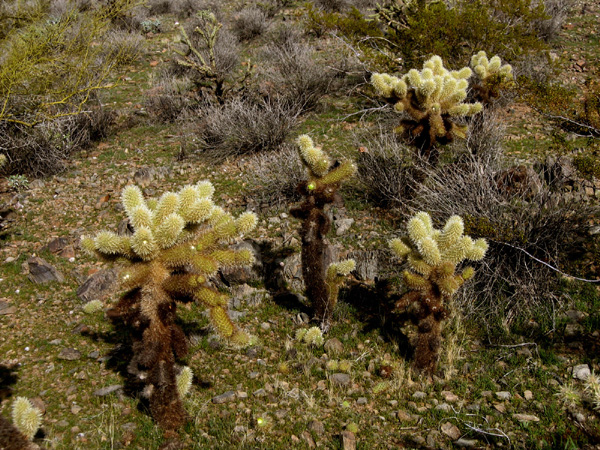
A stand of Cylindropuntia bigelovii

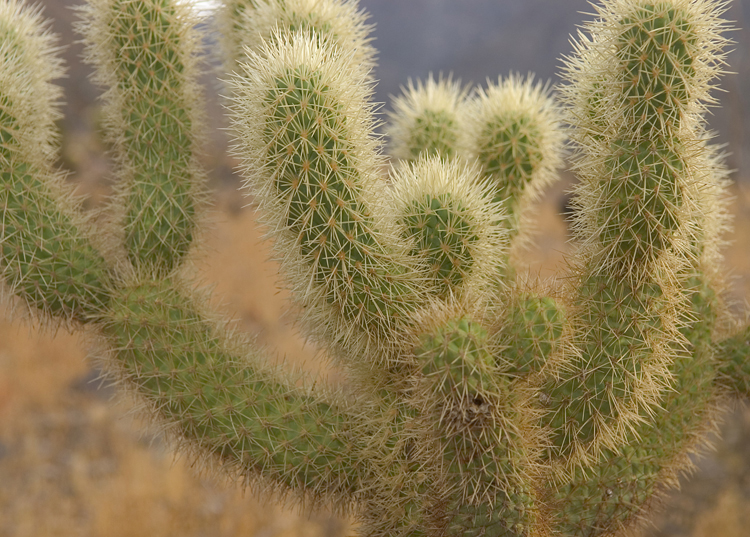
Close up of teddy-bear cholla

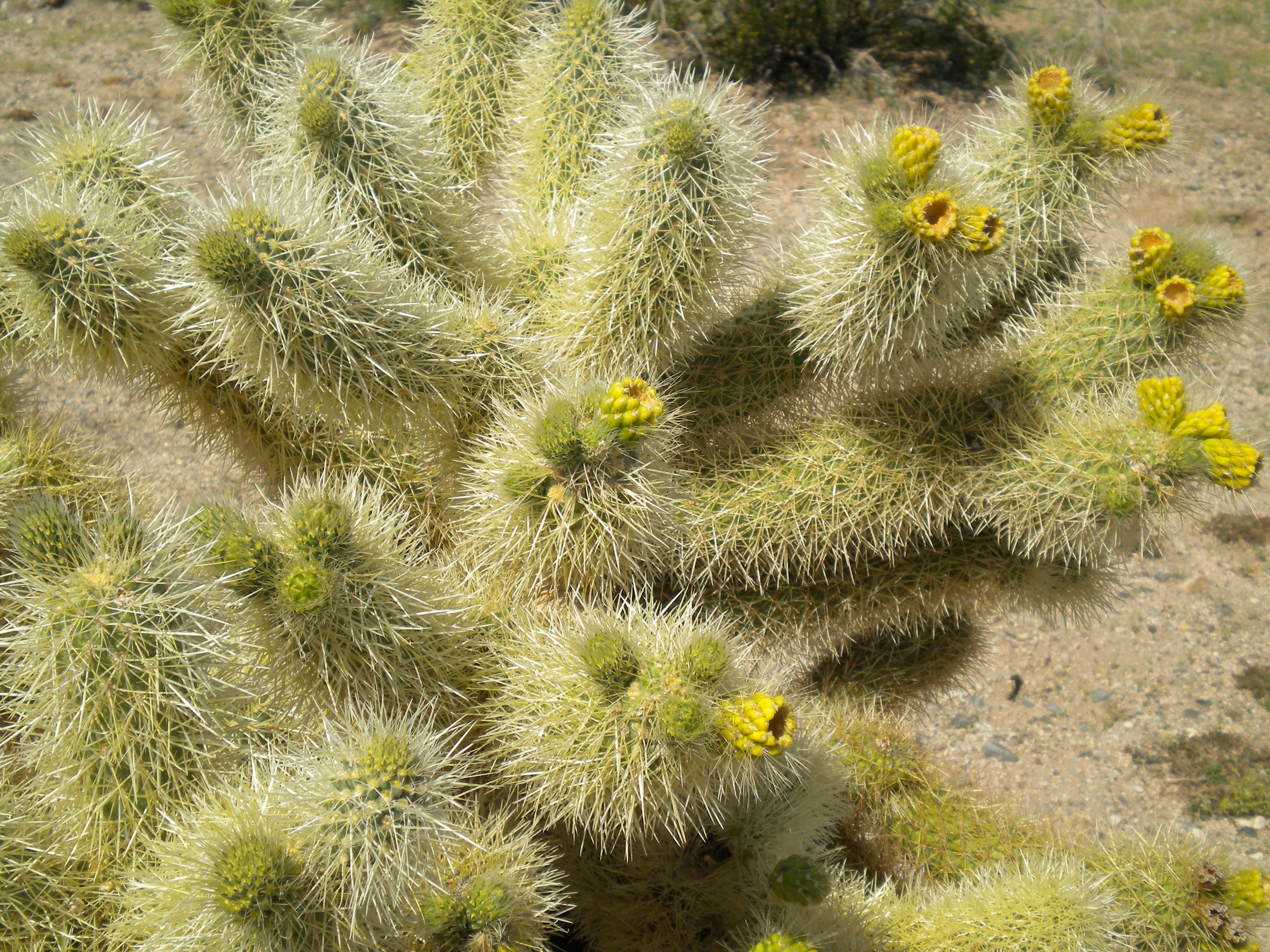
Fruiting Cylindropuntia bigelovii

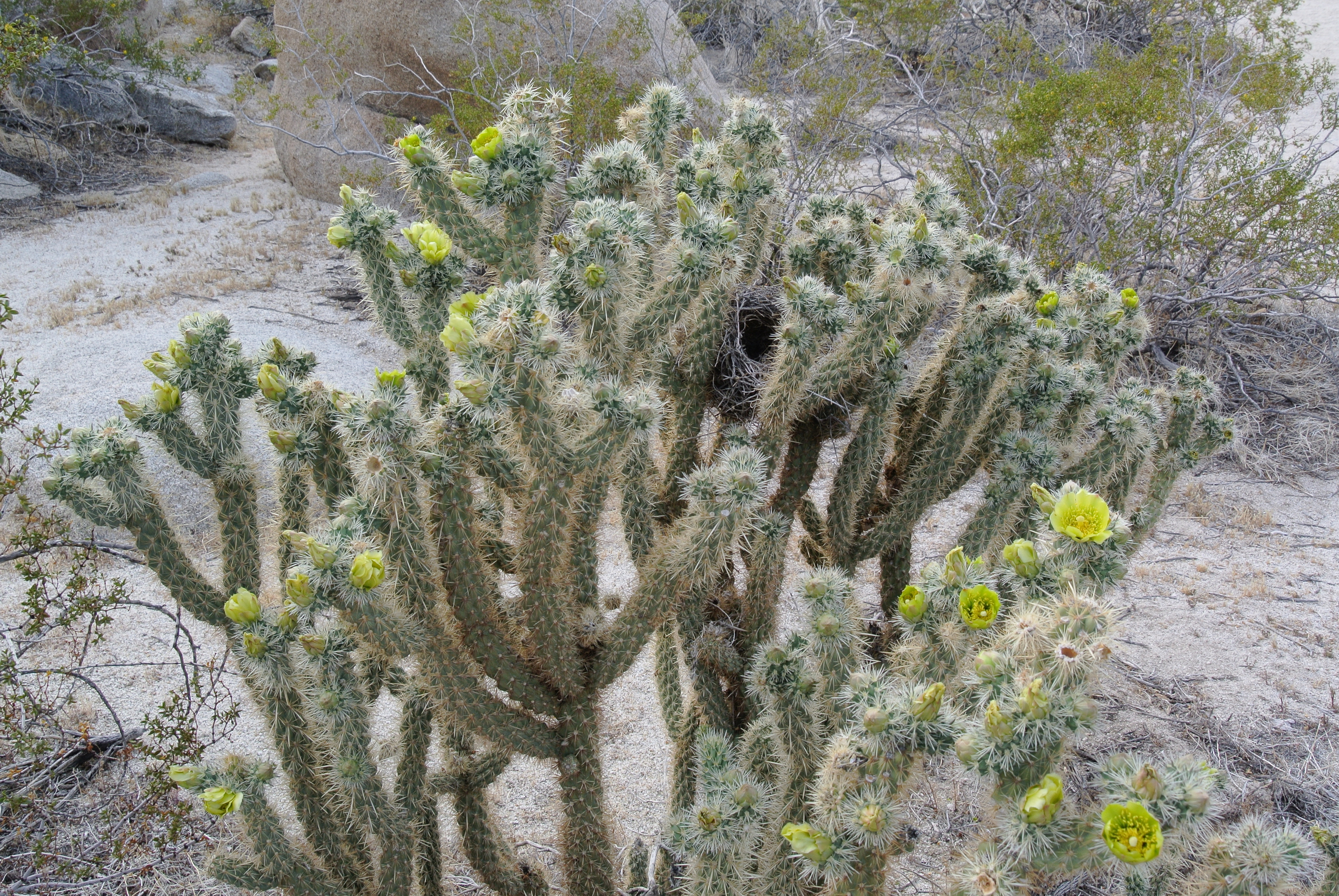
Blooming Cylindropuntia bigelovii with bird nest, in Anza Borrego Desert State Park
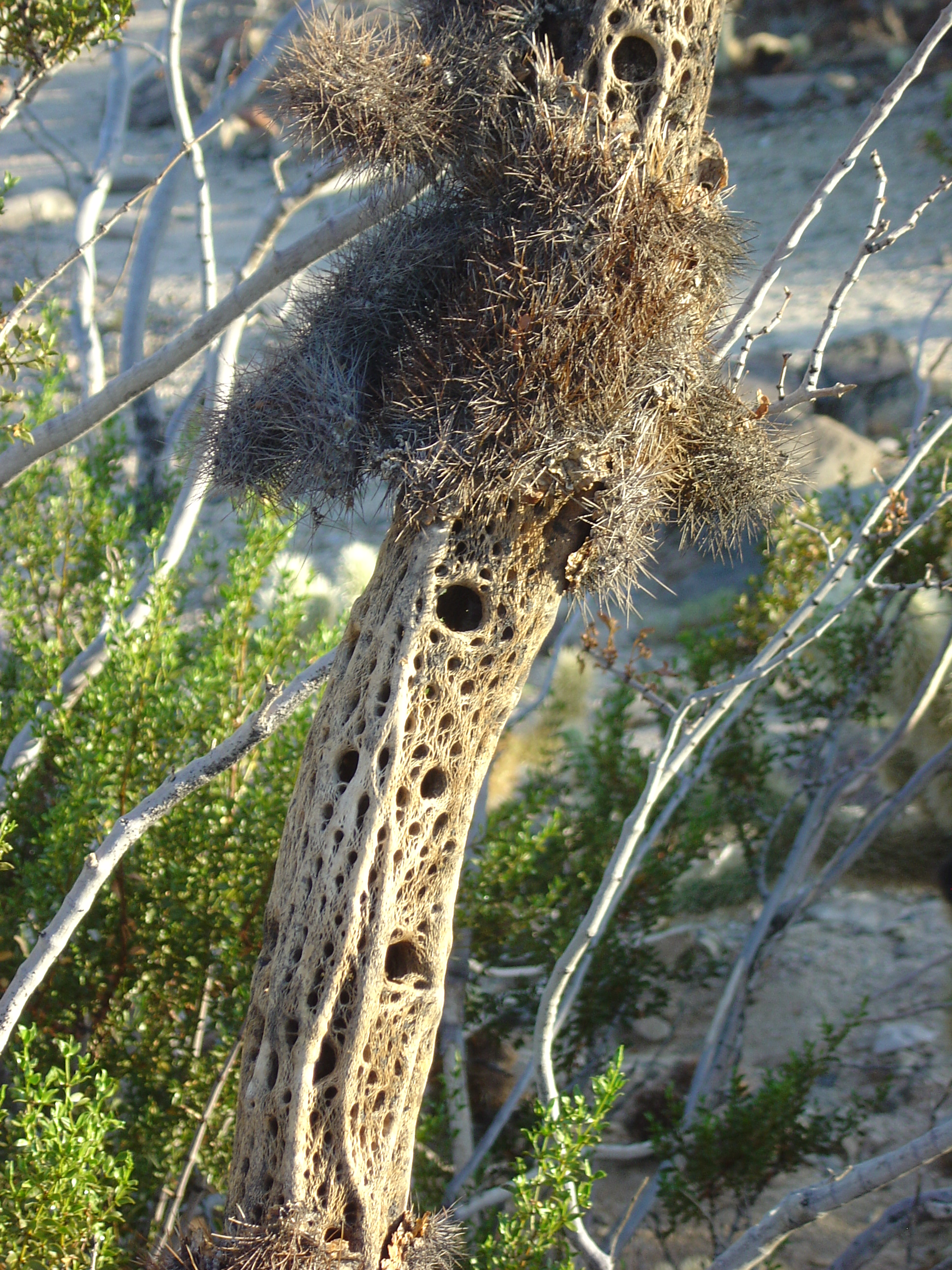
Skeleton of a dead teddy bear cholla.

Teddy bear cholla from Arizona
