= Mitostigma =

Mitostigma may refer to two different genera of plants:

- Mitostigma Blume, a taxonomic synonym for the orchid genus Hemipilia
- Mitostigma Decne., a taxonomic synonym for the plant genus Philibertia
