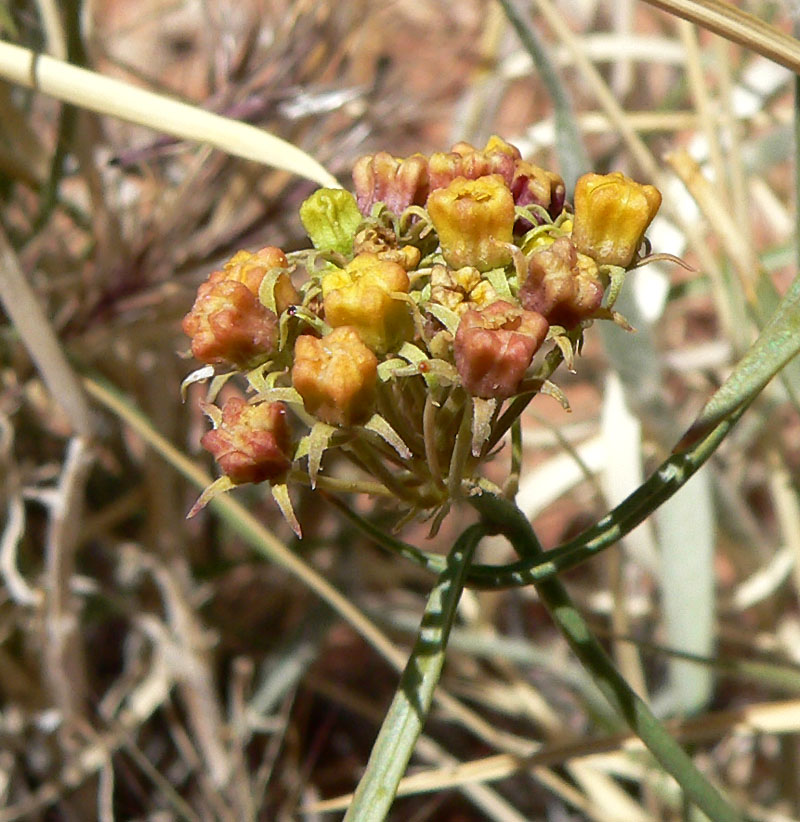

Conservation status
- Apparently Secure (NatureServe)

Scientific classification
- Kingdom: Plantae
- Clade: Embryophytes
- Clade: Tracheophytes
- Clade: Spermatophytes
- Clade: Angiosperms
- Clade: Eudicots
- Clade: Asterids
- Order: Gentianales
- Family: Apocynaceae
- Genus: Funastrum
- Species: F. utahense

Binomial name
- Funastrum utahense (Engelm.) Liede & Meve

Synonyms
- Astephanus utahense Engelm.; Cynanchum utahense (Engelm.) Woodson

= Funastrum utahense =

Species of plant

Funastrum utahense, synonym Cynanchum utahense, is a species of flowering plant in the genus Funastrum of the family Apocynaceae, known by the common names Utah swallow-wort and Utah vine milkweed. This relatively uncommon perennial vine is native to the Mojave Desert from California, Nevada, Utah and Arizona in the United States. This is a small vine with a highly branched, twining stem rarely exceeding a meter in length with which it physically supports itself on other shrubs and trees. It has small narrow leaves a few centimeters long. Its flowers are bright yellow to orange and grow in umbels. The fruit is a grooved follicle several centimeters long.
