= Philibertia castillonii =

Scientific classification
- Kingdom: Plantae
- Clade: Tracheophytes
- Clade: Angiosperms
- Clade: Eudicots
- Clade: Asterids
- Order: Gentianales
- Family: Apocynaceae
- Genus: Philibertia
- Species: P. castillonii

Binomial name
- Philibertia castillonii (Lillo ex T.Mey.) Goyder

Synonyms
- Amblystigma castillonii Lillo; Mitostigma castillonii (Lillo) T.Mey.

Species of plant

Philibertia castillonii, synonym Mitostigma castillonii, is a species of flowering plant in the family Apocynaceae, native to northwest Argentina. It was first described in 1919 as Amblystigma castillonii.
