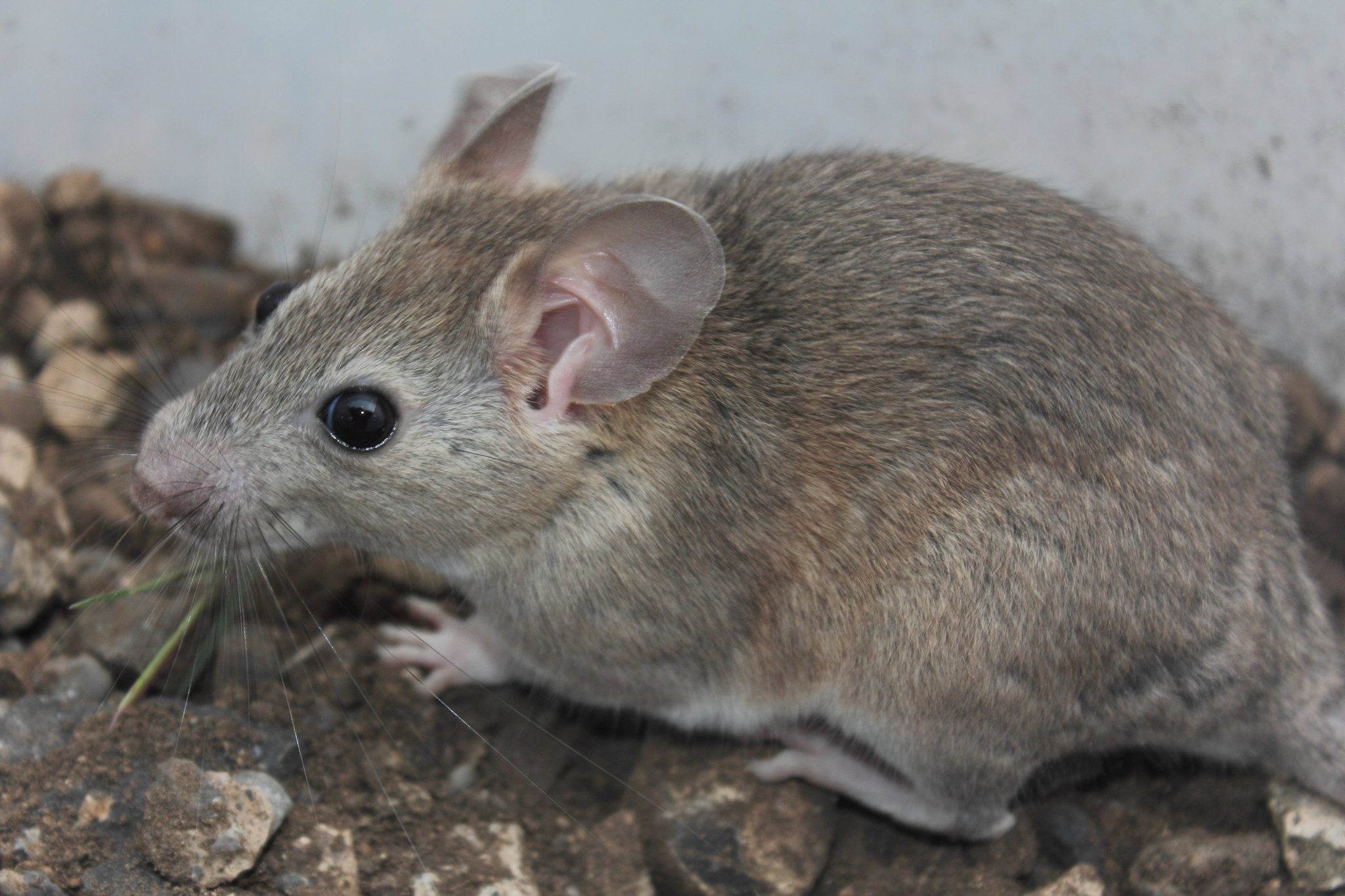
- A white-toothed woodrat in profile.

Conservation status
- Least Concern (IUCN 3.1)

Scientific classification
- Kingdom: Animalia
- Phylum: Chordata
- Class: Mammalia
- Order: Rodentia
- Family: Cricetidae
- Subfamily: Neotominae
- Genus: Neotoma
- Species: N. leucodon

Binomial name
- Neotoma leucodon Merriam, 1894

= White-toothed woodrat =

Species of rodent

Neotoma leucodon is a species of rodent in the family Cricetidae. Although originally named from San Luis Potosí, Mexico, as a species by Clinton Hart Merriam, the white-toothed woodrat was long considered to be a synonym of the white-throated woodrat (Neotoma albigula). Molecular data, however, indicate the populations east of the Rio Grande in New Mexico and Trans-Pecos Texas represent a different species than morphologically similar populations west of the river.

The habitat preferences of the two species appear similar, with woodland to desert habitats preferred. Almost invariably, cacti, especially cholla and prickly pear (Opuntia), are present, and form an integral portion of their diets. In general, the data provided by Macedo and Mares (1988) for what was then thought to be a single species applies to both.

Similar to other woodrats, the white-toothed woodrat gathers sticks and vegetation from its environment to build elaborate dens, which offer protection from predators and from the desert heat.
