= Desert senna =

Desert senna is a common name for multiple plants and may refer to:

- Senna armata
- Senna covesii
