= Turner Island woodrat =

Scientific classification
- Domain: Eukaryota
- Kingdom: Animalia
- Phylum: Chordata
- Class: Mammalia
- Order: Rodentia
- Family: Cricetidae
- Subfamily: Neotominae
- Genus: Neotoma
- Species: N. albigula
- Subspecies: N. a. varia

Trinomial name
- Neotoma albigula varia Burt, 1932

Subspecies of rodent

The Turner Island woodrat (Neotoma albigula varia) is a subspecies of rodent in the family Cricetidae. It is found only in Mexico.
