= Funastrum angustissimum =

Conservation status
- Least Concern (IUCN 3.1)

Scientific classification
- Kingdom: Plantae
- Clade: Embryophytes
- Clade: Tracheophytes
- Clade: Spermatophytes
- Clade: Angiosperms
- Clade: Eudicots
- Clade: Asterids
- Order: Gentianales
- Family: Apocynaceae
- Genus: Funastrum
- Species: F. angustissimum

Binomial name
- Funastrum angustissimum (Andersson) E.Fourn.

Synonyms
- Asclepias angustissima Andersson; Sarcostemma angustissimum (Andersson) R.Holm

Species of plant

Funastrum angustissimum, synonym Sarcostemma angustissima, is a species of flowering plant in the family Apocynaceae. It is endemic to the Galápagos Islands.
