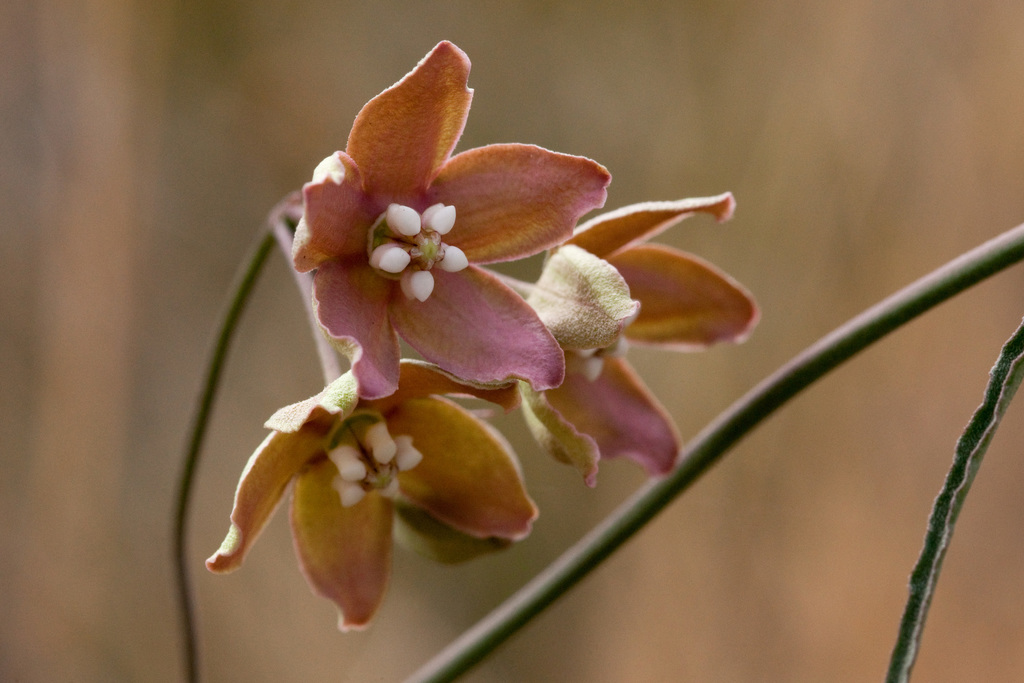
- Funastrum crispum in bloom

Conservation status
- Apparently Secure (NatureServe)

Scientific classification
- Kingdom: Plantae
- Clade: Embryophytes
- Clade: Tracheophytes
- Clade: Angiosperms
- Clade: Eudicots
- Clade: Asterids
- Order: Gentianales
- Family: Apocynaceae
- Genus: Funastrum
- Species: F. crispum

Binomial name
- Funastrum crispum (Benth.) Schltr.

Synonyms
- Sarcostemma crispum Benth.

= Funastrum crispum =

Species of flowering plant

Funastrum crispum, commonly known as the wavyleaf twinevine or wavy-leaf twinevine, is a species of flowering plant in the dogbane family, Apocynaceae. It is a perennial twining vine native to the southwestern and south-central United States and Mexico. It grows primarily in rocky woodlands, canyons, arid hillsides, and open wooded slopes, where its stems often trail across or climb through shrubs.
