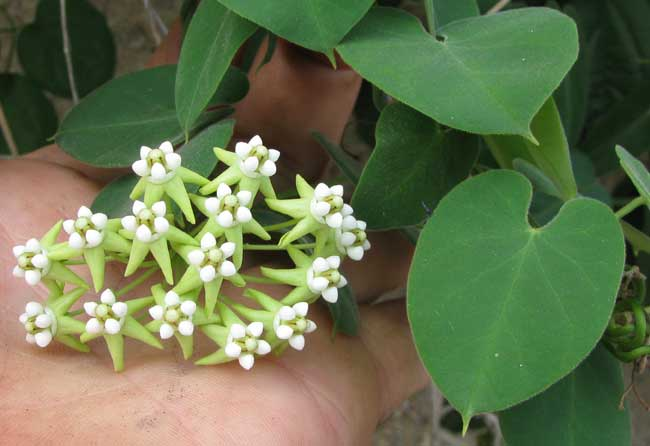
- Inflorescence and leaves

Scientific classification
- Kingdom: Plantae
- Clade: Embryophytes
- Clade: Tracheophytes
- Clade: Angiosperms
- Clade: Eudicots
- Clade: Asterids
- Order: Gentianales
- Family: Apocynaceae
- Genus: Funastrum
- Species: F. bilobum

Binomial name
- Funastrum bilobum (Hook. & Arn.) J.F.Macbr.

Synonyms
- List: Philibertia biloba (Hook. & Arn.) A.Gray; Sarcostemma biloba Hook. & Arn.; Funastrum fendleri A.Gray) Schltr.; Philibertia filipes Rusby; Philibertia fendleri A.Gray; Sarcostemma bellum Standl. & L.O.Williams; Sarcostemma bilobum subsp. filipes (Rusby) Dugand

= Funastrum bilobum =

Species of plant

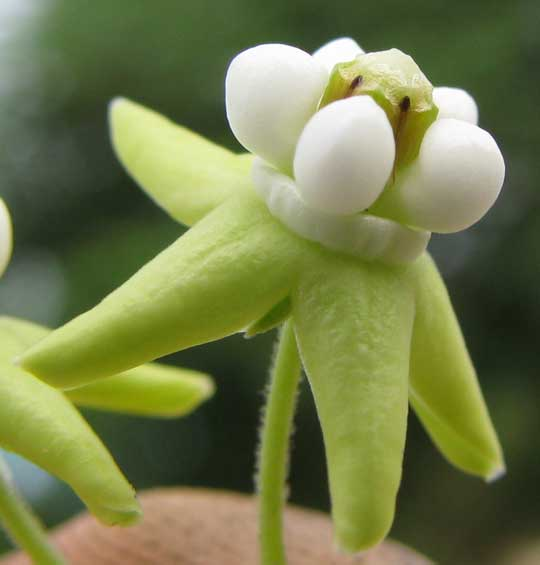
Flower

Funastrum bilobum, with no English name though species of Funastrum often are referred to as climbing milkweeds and twinevines, is a climbing subshrub native to Mexico, Central America and Venezuela. It belongs to the family Apocynaceae.

== Description ==
The following field marks helping to distinguish Funastrum bilobum from similar species:

- Its climbing stems are almost entirely hairless. When injured, plant parts issue a milky latex.
- Leaves have petioles up to 4.5 cm (1 3/4 in) long, and blades which generally are heart-shaped and up to 8 cm (3 1/4 in) long and 5 cm (2 in) wide, with pronounced backward-directed lobes at the bases. Blade undersides are paler than the upper surfaces.
- Umbel-type inflorescences may bear more than 40, densely grouped flowers on hanging peduncles about 6 cm (2 1/4 in) long.
- Flowers have slender pedicels up to 5 cm (2 in) long. Their hairy, sharp-pointed sepals are about 2 mm (1/16 in) long and the pale green, backward-pointed petals are about 9 mm (3/8 in) long. The 5 plump, scoop-shaped "hoods" of the "corona" surrounding the greenish gynostegium are white and up to 3.4 mm (1/8 in) tall. Below the hoods a disc or ring encircles the gynostegium up to 1.1 mm (1/16 in) thick.
- Follicle-type fruits up to 10.6 cm (4 1/4 in) long and 2.6 cm (1 in) wide are asymmetrically broad in the middle and taper at both ends (fusiform). Generally they are smooth-skinned with modest ribs. Seeds up to 6.7 mm (1/4 in) long and about half as wide are somewhat warty, the margins have no indentations, and the tufts of white trichomes, the "comas" atop them, are up to 3.5 cm (1 3/8 in) tall.

== Distribution ==
In Mexico, Funastrum bilobum occurs in approximately the southern half of the country, including the Yucatan Peninsula. It is found in all Central American countries, and in northern South America in Colombia and Venezuela.

== Habitat ==
Funastrum bilobum occurs in gallery forest associated with bodies of water, tropical forests of various types, dry scrubland and habitats disturbed by humans at elevations, below 1,175 m (3,855 ft). Images on this page show an individual encountered draped over a stone wall in a village in Mexico's Yucatán state.

== Ecology ==
The violet sabrewing hummingbird, Campylopterus hemileucurus, has been documented interacting with Funastrum bilobum.

== Conservation status ==
With a wide distribution and ability to survive in disturbed environments, a preliminary study considered Funastrum bilobum to be of least concern (LC) under the IUCN Red List criteria.

== In traditional medicine ==
In Mexico's state of Campeche Funastrum bilobum is used for pimples and snakebite. The milky latex is used. Immediately after a snakebite the leaves are chewed and the milky latex is swallowed.

== Taxonomy ==
In 1841 when William Jackson Hooker and George Arnott Walker Arnott formally described and named Funastrum bilobum under the basionym of Sarcostemma bilobum, he noted that his type specimen was from Acapulco, which is on the Pacific Coast of Mexico. This makes sense because Hooker and Arnott were reporting on plants collected during a voyage of the HMS Blossom captained by Frederick William Beechey taking place from 1825 to 1828, with the goal of surveying the Pacific Ocean's coasts, including the Bering Strait. The ship's log shows that it anchored in Acapulco in April of 1828.

Earlier works included the similar Funastrum lindenianum and Funastrum refractum within the concept of Funastrum bilobum but now are considered distinct species.

=== Etymology ===
The genus name Funastrum derives from the Latin funis, meaing means "rope" and the suffix astrum, which means "star" or "similar". The name refers to the ropy, twining stems of species in the genus, and their flowers' vague similarity to 5-pointed stars.

The bi- in the species name bilobum was taken into English around the 1500s and comes from the French of that time. The meaning of "two" possibly is based partly on or influenced by the Latin bini meaning "twofold". The -lobum is based on the Late Latin lobus, which is derived from the Greek lobos, meaning "lobe". Thus "two lobed", possibly referring to the two-lobed leaf bases.
