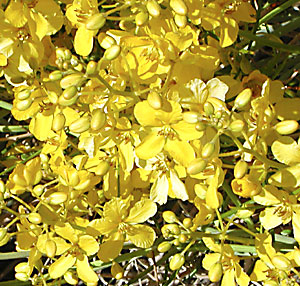

Scientific classification
- Kingdom: Plantae
- Clade: Tracheophytes
- Clade: Angiosperms
- Clade: Eudicots
- Clade: Rosids
- Order: Fabales
- Family: Fabaceae
- Subfamily: Caesalpinioideae
- Genus: Senna
- Species: S. armata

Binomial name
- Senna armata (S.Watson) Irwin & Barneby

Synonyms
- Cassia armata

= Senna armata =

Species of legume

Senna armata is a species of flowering plant in the legume family known by the common names spiny senna and desert senna. It is native to the desert regions around the intersection of Nevada, Arizona, eastern California and northern Baja California, where it grows in sandy and rocky habitat, such as arroyos. It is a shrub growing up to a meter tall, its grooved, branching stems often narrowing to thorns at their tips. The spiny branches are coated in tubular hairs which help protect it from hot desert air. The spine-tipped leaves are each made up of two to four pairs of small leaflets. The leaves are ephemeral, dropping soon after emerging, leaving the shrub naked most of the time. Flowers occur singly or in small clusters in leaf axils. They are fragrant and showy, with five petals in shades of yellow to salmon pink, each measuring roughly a centimeter long. The fruit is a legume pod up to 4 centimeters long.
