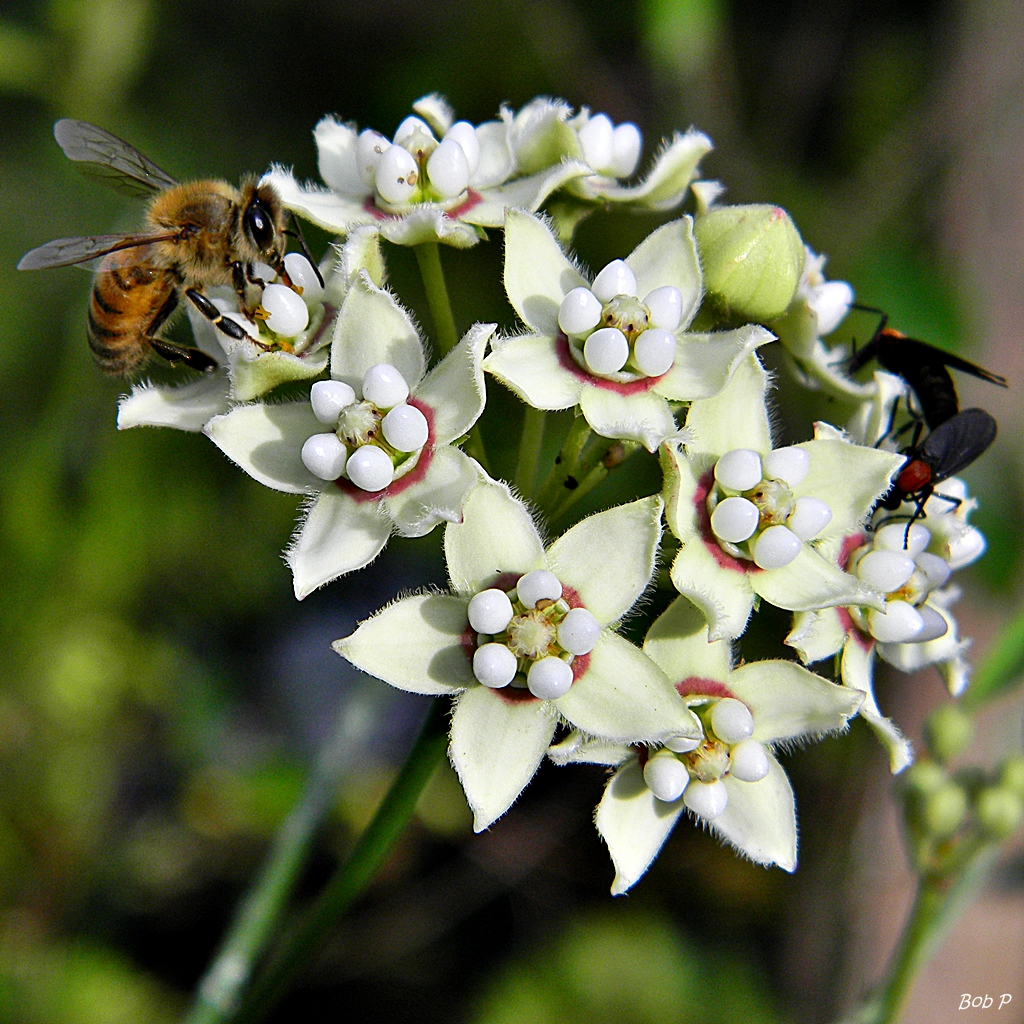

Conservation status
- Secure (NatureServe)

Scientific classification
- Kingdom: Plantae
- Clade: Embryophytes
- Clade: Tracheophytes
- Clade: Spermatophytes
- Clade: Angiosperms
- Clade: Eudicots
- Clade: Asterids
- Order: Gentianales
- Family: Apocynaceae
- Genus: Funastrum
- Species: F. clausum

Binomial name
- Funastrum clausum (Jacq.) Schult.

Synonyms
- Asclepias clausa Jacq.; Philibertella riparia (Decne.) K.Schum.; Sarcostemma apiculatum Decne.; Sarcostemma clausum (Jacq.) Schult.; Sarcostemma riparium Decne.

= Funastrum clausum =

Species of plant

Funastrum clausum, commonly known as white twinevine, is a species of flowering plant in the dogbane family, Apocynaceae. It is native to southern Florida and Texas in the United States, Mexico, the Caribbean, Central America and South America as far south as Paraguay.
