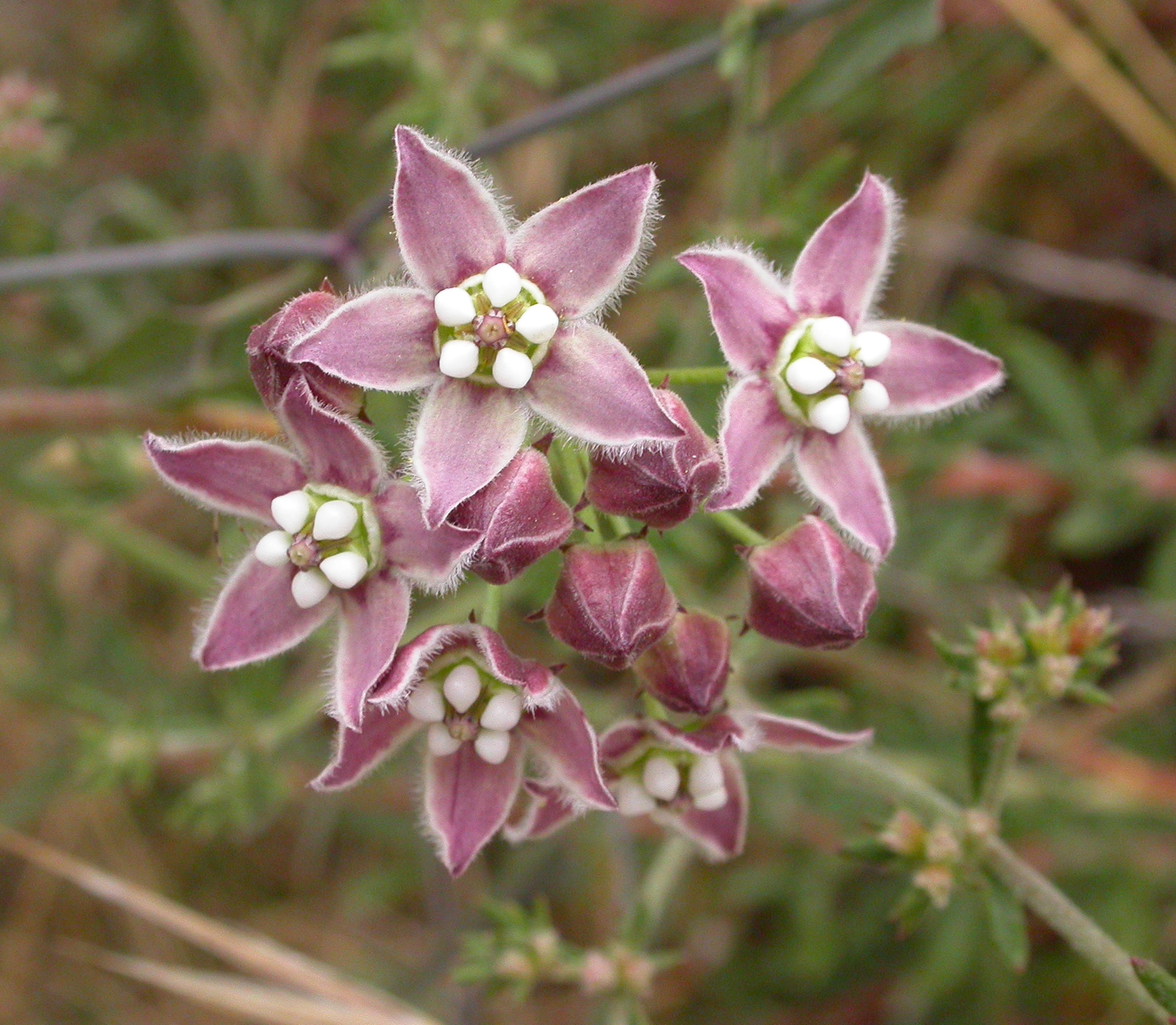

Scientific classification
- Kingdom: Plantae
- Clade: Embryophytes
- Clade: Tracheophytes
- Clade: Spermatophytes
- Clade: Angiosperms
- Clade: Eudicots
- Clade: Asterids
- Order: Gentianales
- Family: Apocynaceae
- Genus: Funastrum
- Species: F. cynanchoides

Binomial name
- Funastrum cynanchoides (Decne.) Schltr.

Synonyms
- Sarcostemma cynanchoides Decne.

= Funastrum cynanchoides =

Species of plant

Funastrum cynanchoides (formerly called Sarcostemma cynanchoides), also known as fringed twinevine, twining milkweed or climbing milkweed, is a perennial plant in the family Apocynaceae that grows twining through other plants in the Mojave Desert and Sonoran Desert. It has milky sap and smells pungent. It is similar to Funastrum hirtellum.

== Description ==
It is a twining vine-like plant that grows over other shrubs.

Its narrow, arrowhead shaped leaves are opposite and 2.5 to 3.8 centimeters (1 to 1 1/2 inches) long.

The flowers are pink to purplish, and are produced in umbrella-like heads (umbels) up to 10 cm (4 in) wide.

It has a fruit that is 7.5 to 10 cm (3 to 4 in) long, with tufted seeds about 3.5 cm (1 1/2 in) long.

== Distribution and habitat ==
It can be found from Southern California to Utah, Oklahoma and Texas. It grows at the edge of desert dry washes in the eastern Mojave Desert and Sonoran Desert at altitudes below 610 meters (2,000 feet).

In urban areas the vine freely climbs on plants, trees, as well as having a preference for chain-link fencing in neglected areas.

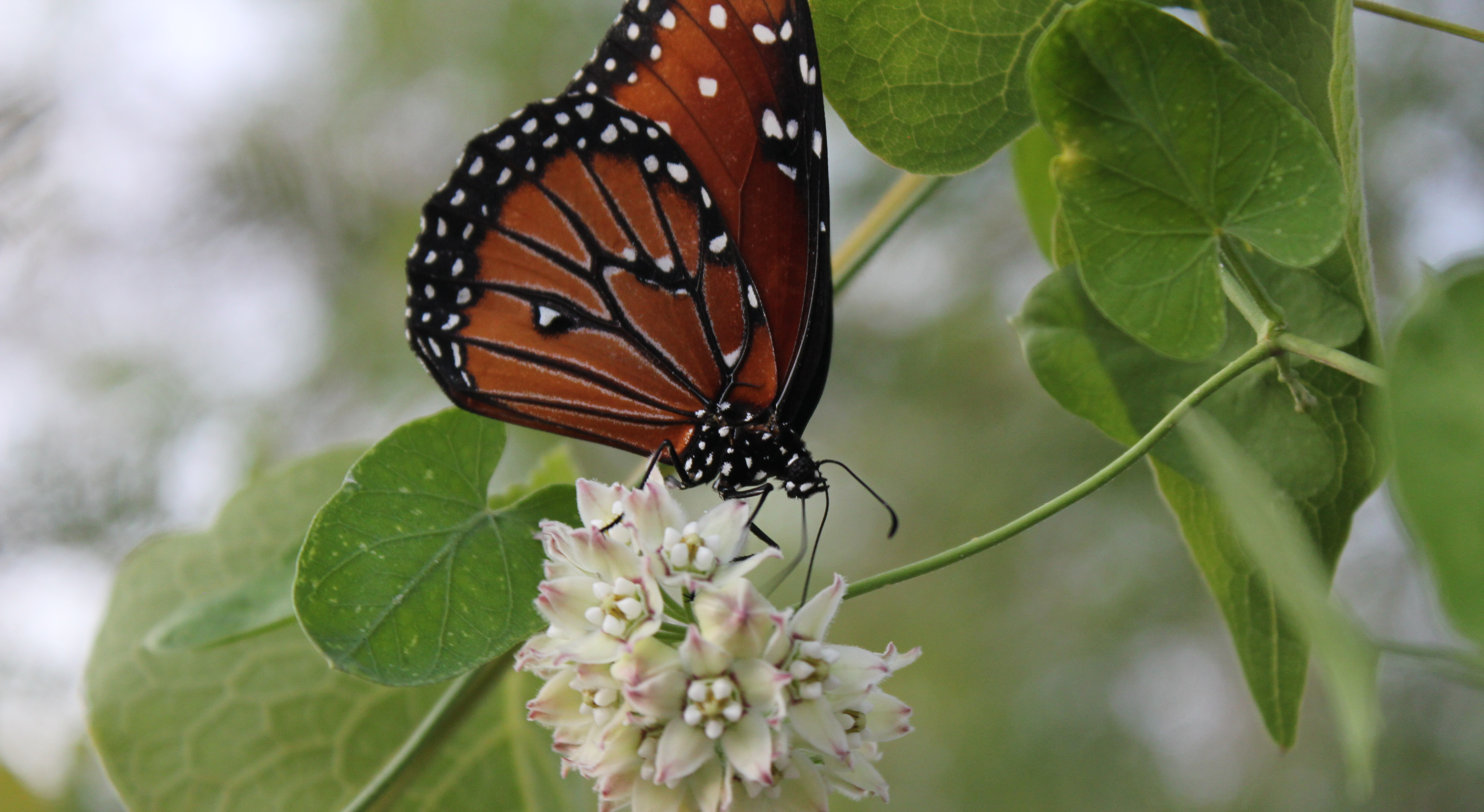
Danaus butterfly on a flower

== Ecology ==
The flowers are actively visited and fed on by butterflies, similar to other milkweeds.
