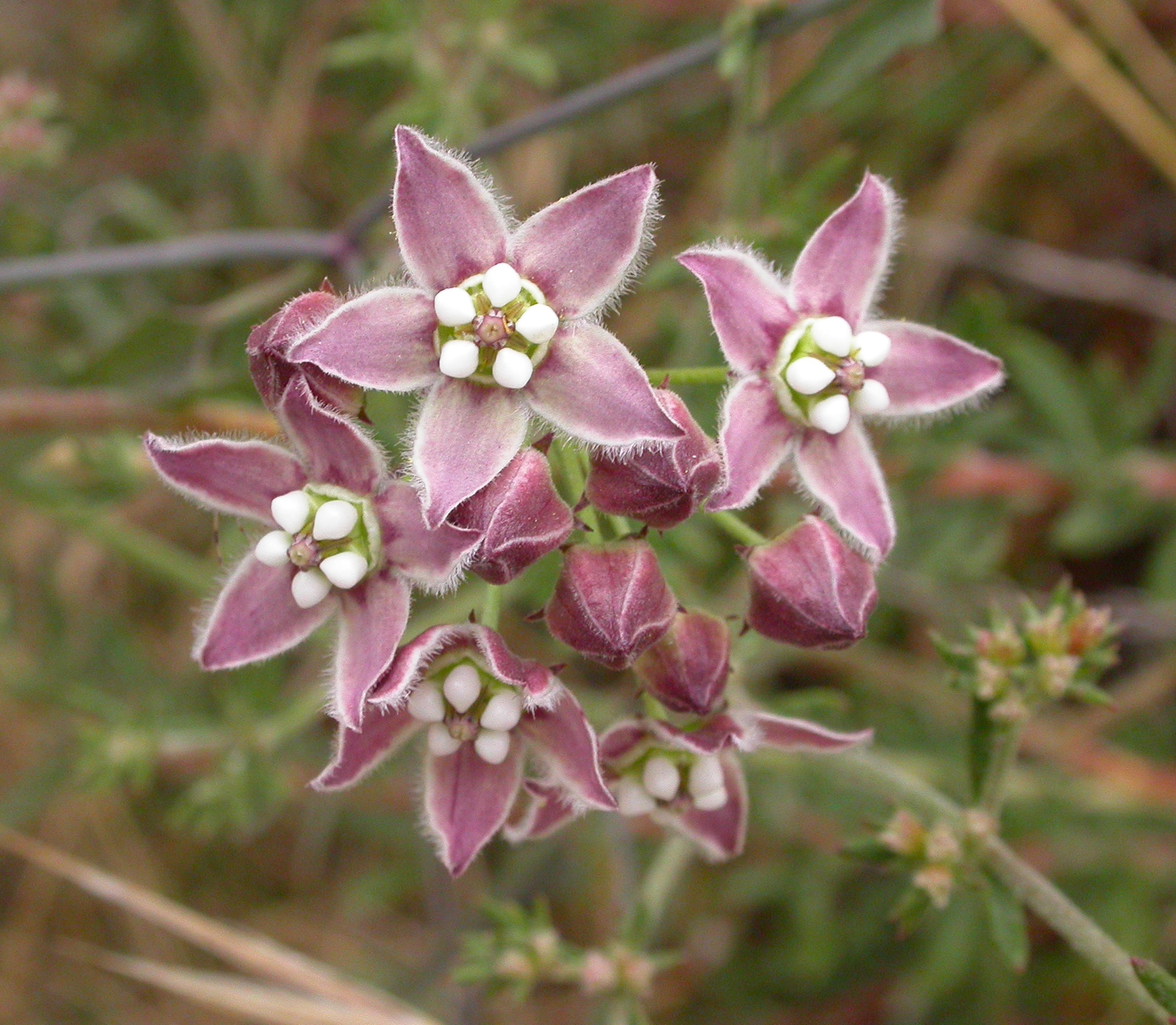
- Funastrum cynanchoides

Scientific classification
- Kingdom: Plantae
- Clade: Embryophytes
- Clade: Tracheophytes
- Clade: Spermatophytes
- Clade: Angiosperms
- Clade: Eudicots
- Clade: Asterids
- Order: Gentianales
- Family: Apocynaceae
- Tribe: Asclepiadeae
- Genus: Funastrum; E.Fourn.

Synonyms
- Ceramanthus (Kunze) Malme, nom. illeg.; Philibertella Vail

= Funastrum =

Genus of plants

Funastrum is a genus of flowering plant now in the family Apocynaceae. The name is derived from the Latin word funis, meaning "rope", and astrum, alluding to the twining stems. Members of the genus are commonly known as twinevines.

== Species ==
As of February 2023, Plants of the World Online accepted the following species:

- Funastrum angustissimum (Andersson) E.Fourn.
- Funastrum arenarium (Decne. ex Benth.) Liede
- Funastrum bilobum (Hook. & Arn.) J.F.Macbr.
- Funastrum clausum (Jacq.) Schltr. – white twinevine
- Funastrum crispum (Benth.) Schltr. – wavyleaf twinevine
- Funastrum cynanchoides (Decne.) Schltr. – fringed twinevine
- Funastrum elegans (Decne.) Schltr.
- Funastrum flavum (Meyen) Malme
- Funastrum glaucum (Kunth) Schltr.
- Funastrum gracile (Decne.) Schltr.
- Funastrum heterophyllum (Engelm. ex Torr.) Standl.
- Funastrum hirtellum (Vail) Schltr. – hairy milkweed
- Funastrum lindenianum (Decne.) Schltr.
- Funastrum odoratum (Hemsl.) Schltr.
- Funastrum pannosum (Decne.) Schltr.
- Funastrum refractum (Donn.Sm.) Schltr.
- Funastrum rupicola Goyder
- Funastrum suffrutescens E.Fourn.
- Funastrum torreyi (A.Gray) Schltr. – soft twinevine
- Funastrum trichopetalum (Silveira) Schltr.
- Funastrum utahense (Engelm.) Liede & Meve

=== Formerly placed here ===
- Seutera angustifolia (Pers.) Fishbein & W.D.Stevens (as F. angustifolium (Pers.) Liede & Meve)
