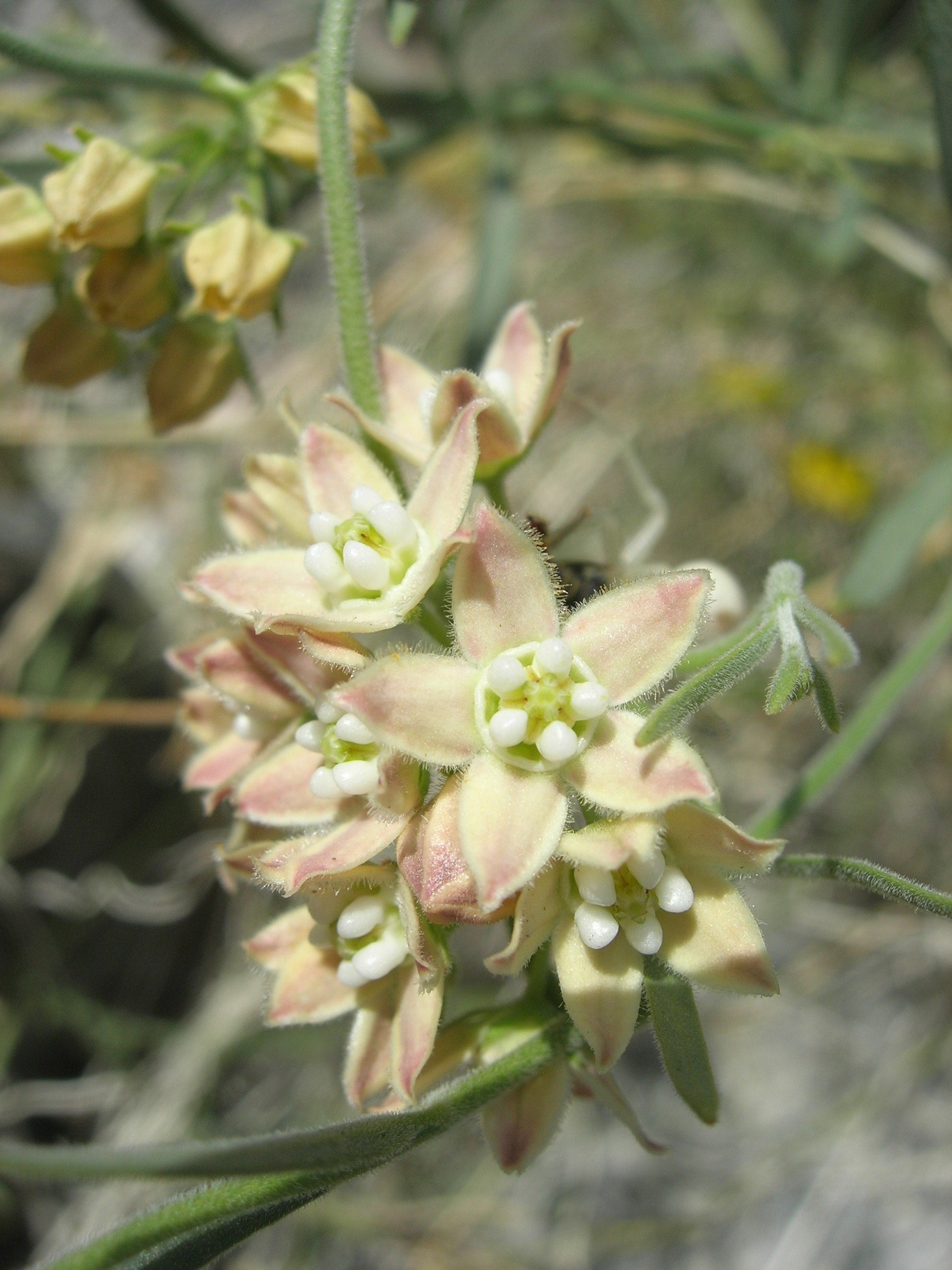

Scientific classification
- Kingdom: Plantae
- Clade: Embryophytes
- Clade: Tracheophytes
- Clade: Spermatophytes
- Clade: Angiosperms
- Clade: Eudicots
- Clade: Asterids
- Order: Gentianales
- Family: Apocynaceae
- Genus: Funastrum
- Species: F. hirtellum

Binomial name
- Funastrum hirtellum (Vail) Schltr.

Synonyms
- Philibertella hirtella Vail; Philibertia hirtella (Vail) Parish; Sarcostemma hirtellum (Vail) R.Holm

= Funastrum hirtellum =

Species of plant

Funastrum hirtellum, synonym Sarcostemma hirtellum, (rambling milkweed, hairy milkweed), is a perennial, vine-like plant of mid- to lower-elevation desert regions. It is a member of the family Asclepiadaceae and the genus Funastrum. It is found in the southwestern United States and northwestern Mexico — in southeastern California, southern Nevada, Arizona, Sonora, and Baja California.

Hairy milkweed can be an aggressive, opportunistic species, capable of overtaking a suitable sprouting location and killing the plants it grows upon. If the supporting plants can compete successfully, all of the species continue.

The green vines have few narrow leaves and are themselves photosynthetic. In early- and mid-spring, flower clusters occur in a circular or half-globe cluster of 7 to 13+ florets, with each floret about 3/8 of an inch. The flower clusters are sometimes profuse and therefore noticeable. When the dried seedpods remain months later, after the vines have desiccated, they are the plant identifier. Another indicator of the plant's presence is the inundation of the supporting species, or multiple species, by quantities of vines.
